= 1843 in Sweden =

- Years in Sweden: 1840 1841 1842 1843 1844 1845 1846
- Centuries: 18th century · 19th century · 20th century
- Decades: 1810s 1820s 1830s 1840s 1850s 1860s 1870s
- Years: 1840 1841 1842 1843 1844 1845 1846

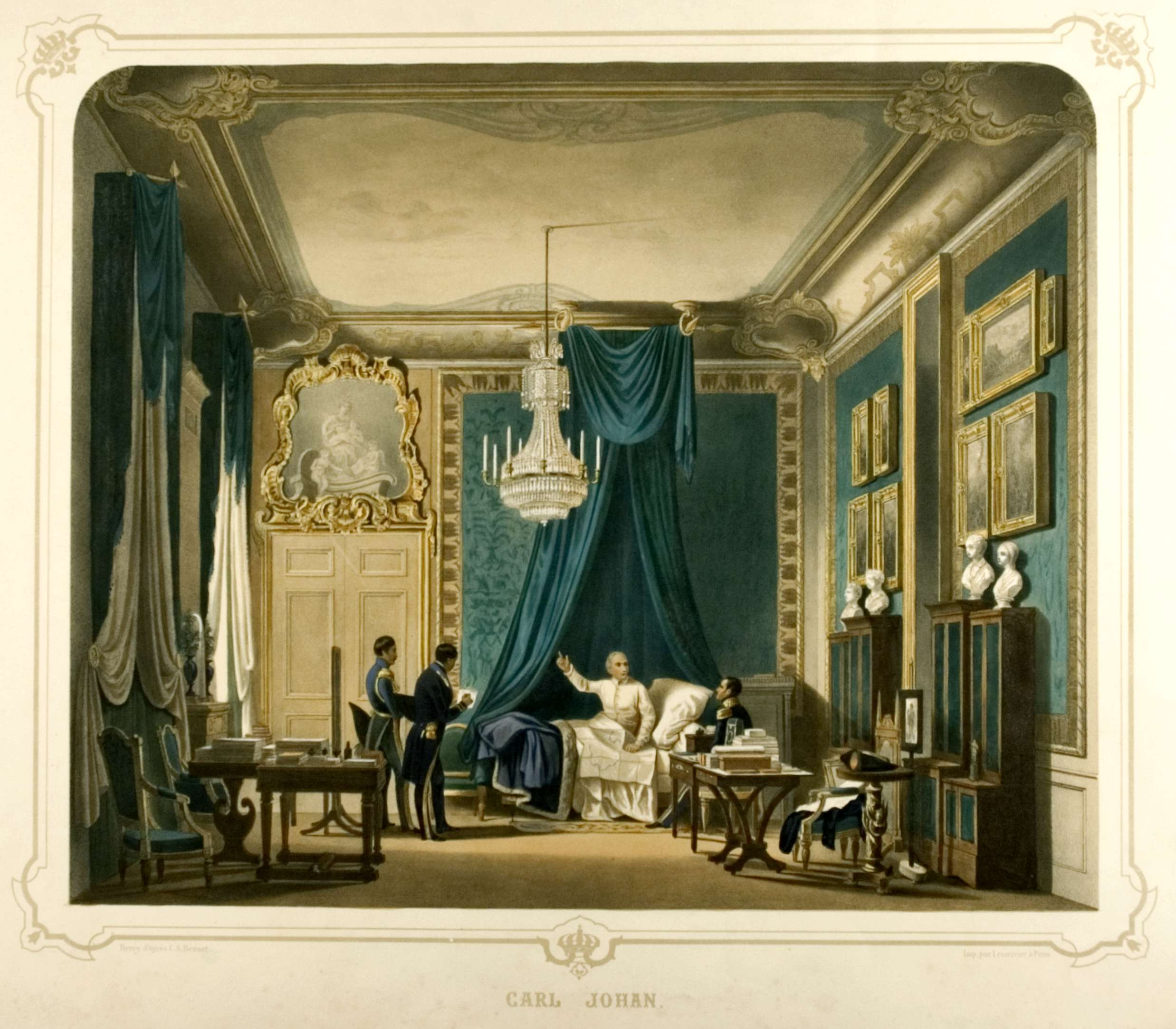

Events from the year 1843 in Sweden

== Incumbents ==
- Monarch – Charles XIV John

== Events ==
- 4 June - The newspaper Nerikes Allehanda begun its publication.
- Blomsterspråket, historiskt, mythologiskt och poetiskt tecknadt by Wilhelmina Stålberg
- Förhoppingar by Sophie von Knorring
- Crapula Mundi by Lars Levi Læstadius
- Lyriska toner by Wilhelmina Stålberg
- Positiv-hataren by August Blanche

== Births ==
- 13 February – Georg von Rosen, painter (died 1923)
- 20 August – Christina Nilsson, opera singer (died 1921)
- 14 September – Gurli Åberg, stage actress (died 1922)
- 28 October – Anna Nordlander, painter (died 1879)
- 7 December – Helena Nyblom, children's story author (died 1926)
- Lilly Engström, first female member of a Board of education (died 1921)

== Deaths ==
- 8 July – Lars Hjortsberg, actor (born 1772)
- 1 April - Adolph Ribbing, regicide participator (born 1765)
