= 1849 in Sweden =

- Decades: 1820s; 1830s; 1840s; 1850s; 1860s
- See also: Other events of 1849; Timeline of Swedish history

Events from the year 1849 in Sweden

== Background ==
Unlike the rest of Europe, Sweden wasn’t severely affected by the Revolutions of 1848, as some protests in March fizzled out, and the country spent the rest of 1848 in relative peace.

== Incumbents ==
- Monarch – Oscar I

== Events ==
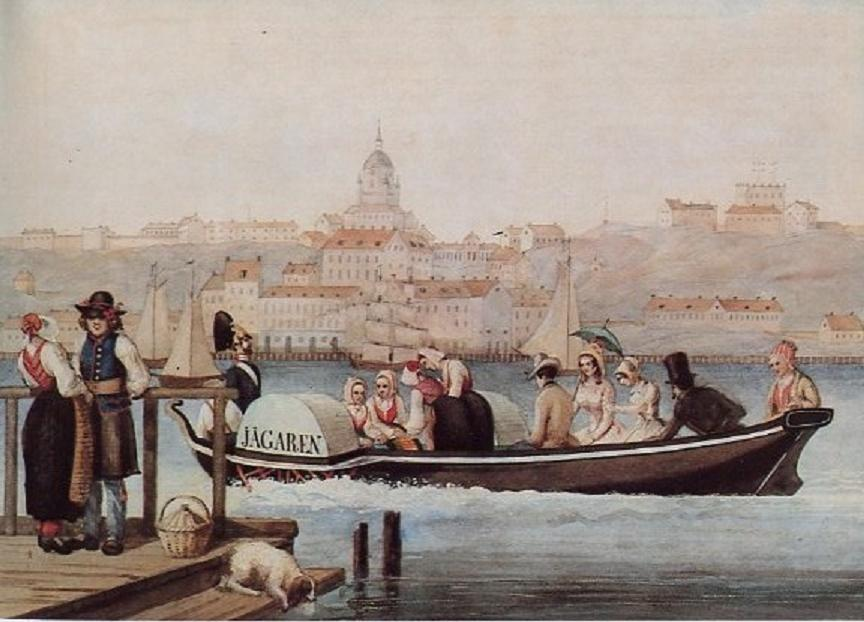
Kullor-vevbåt (1849)

- 11 May – The Uppsala Student Union was formed at Uppsala University, the first of its kind in Sweden.
- October – Swedish writer and reformist Fredrika Bremer travels to the United States and lands in New York City, beginning her two year long journey across the US and Britain.
- The Bourse (Gothenburg) is opened.
- The second of the von Schwerin Estate's Scandals attracts attention.
- The Nya smedjegården in Stockholm is transformed to a women's prison.

== Births ==
- 13 January – Alfhild Agrell, writer and playwright (died 1923)
- 22 January – August Strindberg, writer and playwright (died 1912)
- 25 May – Louise Hammarström, chemist (died 1917)
- 31 May – Carl Fredrik Hill, painter (died 1911)
- 22 September – Olena Falkman, concert vocalist (died 1928)
- 1 October – Anne Charlotte Leffler, writer and playwright (died 1892)
- 7 October – Martina Bergman-Österberg, physical education instructor and women's suffrage advocate (died 1915)
- 17 October – Johan Ericson, landscape painter (died 1925)
- 6 December – Maria Adelborg, textile artist (died 1940)
- 11 December – Ellen Key, writer (died 1926)
- 14 December – Wilhelmina Skogh, business person (died 1926)
- 31 December – Birger Eek, artist (died 1899)

== Deaths ==
- 4 January – Louise von Fersen, courtier (born 1777)
- 15 January – Erik August Schröder, philosopher (born 1796)
- 5 February – Johan Fredric Ehrenstam, colonel and naval minister (born 1800)
- 12 February – Carl von Zeipel, author (born 1793)
- 19 March – Carl David af Uhr, mining official (born 1770)
- 28 March – Djos Per Andersson, death row inmate who wrote an account of his imprisonment (born 1814)
- 19 April – Abraham Bengtsson Nyström, master builder (born 1789)
- 14 May – Hedvig Charlotta Lagerqvist, actress (born 1783)
- 14 May – Otto Sebastian von Unge, travel writer (born 1797)
- 19 June – Michael Silvius von Hohenhausen, civil servant (born 1790)
- 28 August – Carl Johan Hartman, physician and botanist (born 1790)
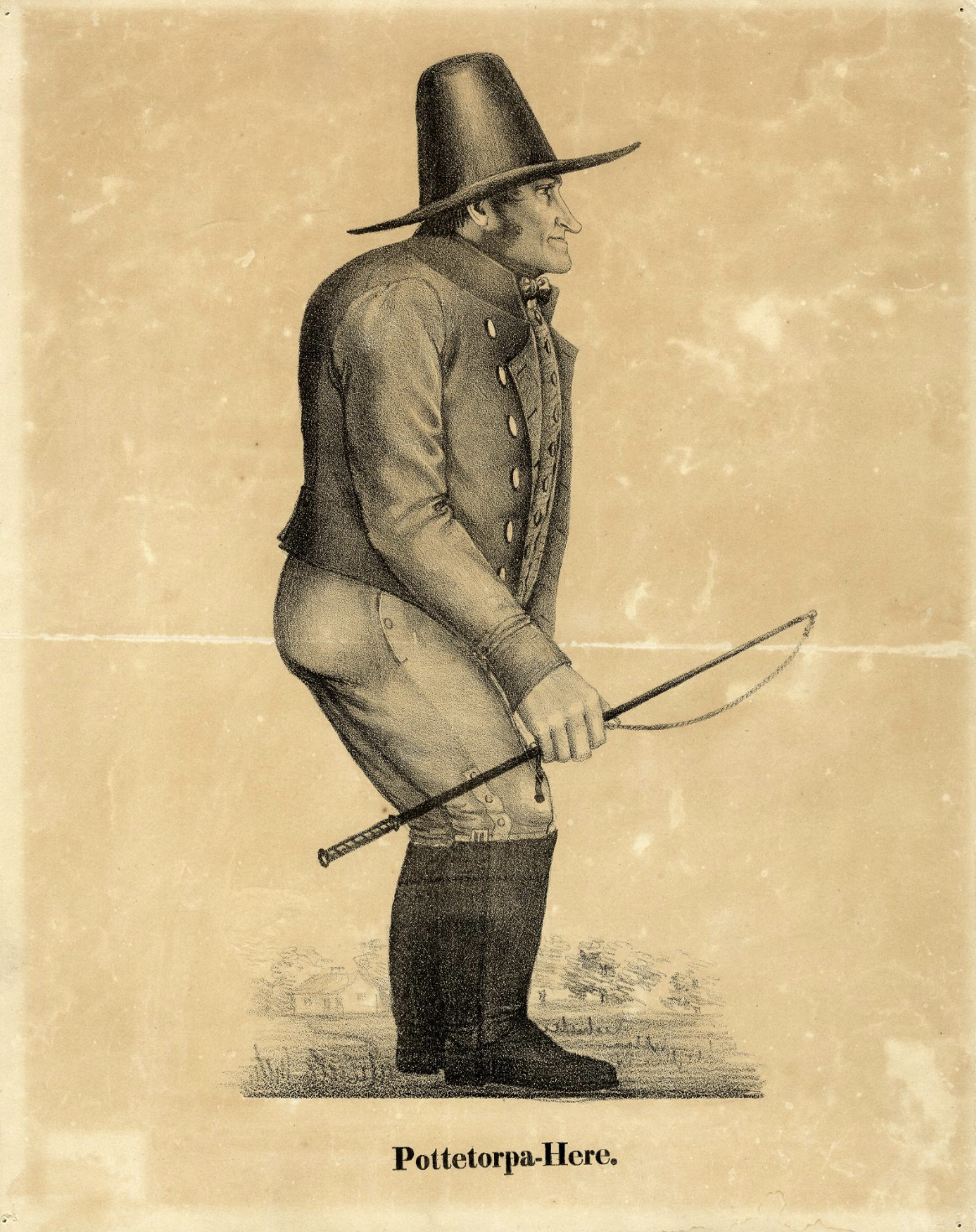
  Jöns Abrahamsson Ram, Sweden's 'Gentle Giant' (1840)
- 31 August – Tin Erik Andersson, sculptor who carved the pulpit of Böda Church (born 1803)
- 18 November – Daniel Ehrenfried Gravallius, priest and author (born 1777)
- 12 December – Anders Lindeberg, author, publisher, and theatre owner, convicted of treason but pardoned before his beheading (born 1789)
- 26 December – Samuel Johan Hedborn, author, poet, and hymn writer (born 1783)

=== Undated ===
- Beata Ulrika Flygare, writer, printer and newspaper publisher
- Carl Adolf Levisson, author (born 1810)
- Jöns Abrahamsson Ram, Sweden's 'gentle giant' (born 1791)

== Publications ==
- Carl Jonas Love Almqvist's poetry collection Songes.
- Johan Börjesson's lyrical writings Kärlek och poesi ('Love and Poetry').
- Fredrika Bremer's travelogue Life in the North.
- Emilie Flygare-Carlén's novels Romanhjältinnan and Familjen i dalen.
- Fredrica Ehrenborg publishes the last of her children's morality tales "Tvillingarna eller försoningen" ('The twins or the reconciliation') in her periodical Läsning för barn ('Reading for Children').
- Wilhelmina Stålberg translates Heinrich Hoffmann’s children’s book Der Struwwelpeter for two publishers: Adolf Bonnier releases the book as Julbocken eller Den svenske Drummel-Petter, while PG Berg release it as Drummelpelle, eller Lustiga berättelser och roliga bilder, för barn 3–6 år.
- Wilhelmina Stålberg's historical novel Drottning Filippa ('Queen Philippa').
- Wilhelm Tham's geographical books Beskrifning öfver Örebro län ('Description of Örebro county') and Beskrifning öfver Westerås län ('Description of Westerås county').
- Gunnar Wennerberg's composition "Gluntarne."
