= 1835 in Sweden =

- Years in Sweden: 1832 1833 1834 1835 1836 1837 1838
- Centuries: 18th century · 19th century · 20th century
- Decades: 1800s 1810s 1820s 1830s 1840s 1850s 1860s
- Years: 1832 1833 1834 1835 1836 1837 1838

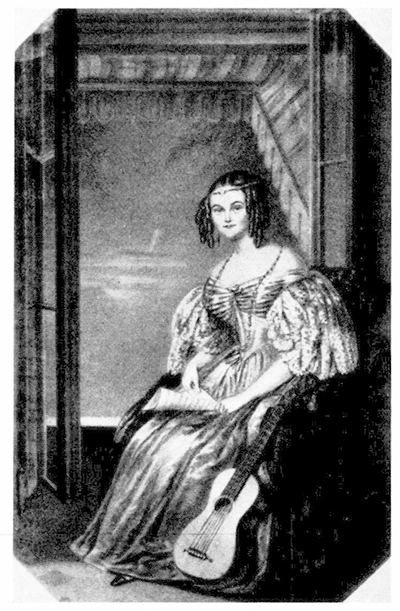
Christina Enbom by Maria Röhl, 1830s

Events from the year 1835 in Sweden

== Incumbents ==
- Monarch – Charles XIV John

== Events ==
- - Inauguration of Kjellbergska flickskolan in Gothenburg.
- - The pig iron trade is liberalized.
- - The Breaking wheel is abolished.
- - Foundation of the Juvenals society.
- - Hesperider by Karl August Nicander.
- - Vännerna by Sophie von Knorring.

== Births ==
- 14 January - Emmy Rappe, pioneer nurse (died 1896)
- 15 February - Clementine Swartz, actress (died 1923)
- 21 March - Maria Magdalena Mathsdotter, Sami (died 1873)
- 5 June - Amanda Kerfstedt, writer (died 1920)
- 30 December - John Börjeson, sculptor
- - Hilda Sjölin, photographer (died 1915)

== Deaths ==
- 4 June - Eleonora Charlotta d'Albedyhll, salonnière, cultural patron and poet (born 1770)
- 10 November – Anders Ljungstedt, merchant and historian (born 1759)
- 23 November – Georg Adlersparre, politician, military and writer (born 1760)
- 8 May - Sofia Lovisa Gråå, educator (born 1749)
- 31 July - Adolf Ludvig Stierneld, baron, politician, courtier and collector of historical documents (born 1755)
- Christina Fris, industrialist (born 1757)
