= 1839 in Sweden =

- Years in Sweden: 1836 1837 1838 1839 1840 1841 1842
- Centuries: 18th century · 19th century · 20th century
- Decades: 1800s 1810s 1820s 1830s 1840s 1850s 1860s
- Years: 1836 1837 1838 1839 1840 1841 1842

Events from the year 1839 in Sweden

== Incumbents ==
- Monarch – Charles XIV John

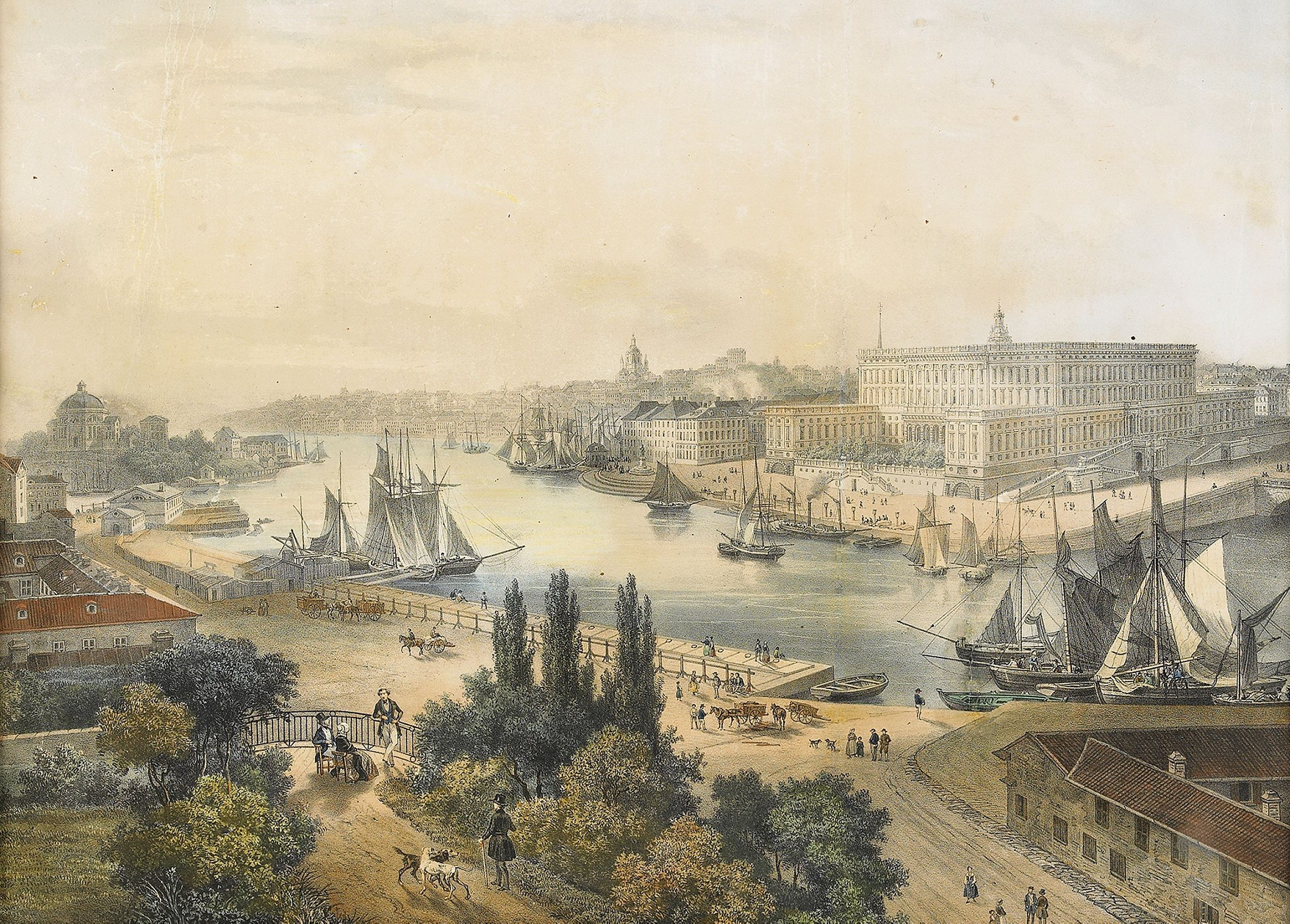
Stockholm

== Events ==
- The revised edition of the radical novel Det går an by Carl Jonas Love Almqvist, first published in 1822, is published
- Liljeholmens Stearinfabriks AB
- Stockholms Lyceum

== Births ==
- 2 March - Victoria Bundsen, opera alto (died 1909)
- 18 April - Lotten Edholm, composer and a pioneer within the Swedish Red Cross (died 1930)
- 21 May - Nils Christoffer Dunér, astronomer (died 1914)
- 24 August - Sofie Johannesdotter, serial killer (died 1876)
- 2 November - Augusta Braunerhjelm, playwright (died 1929)
- 30 December - Victor Hartman, actor (died 1898)
- Charlotte Yhlen, doctor (died 1919)
- Hulda Mellgren, industrialist (died 1918)

== Deaths ==
- 7 February - Karl August Nicander, poet (born 1799)
- 30 June - Johan Olof Wallin, minister, orator, poet and later Church of Sweden Archbishop of Uppsala (born 1779)
- Jacquette Löwenhielm, royal mistress (born 1797)
- Pär Aron Borg, pioneer in the education for the blind and deaf (born 1776)
- Pehr Henrik Ling, called the "father of Swedish athletics"
