= 1842 in Sweden =

- Years in Sweden: 1839 1840 1841 1842 1843 1844 1845
- Centuries: 18th century · 19th century · 20th century
- Decades: 1810s 1820s 1830s 1840s 1850s 1860s 1870s
- Years: 1839 1840 1841 1842 1843 1844 1845

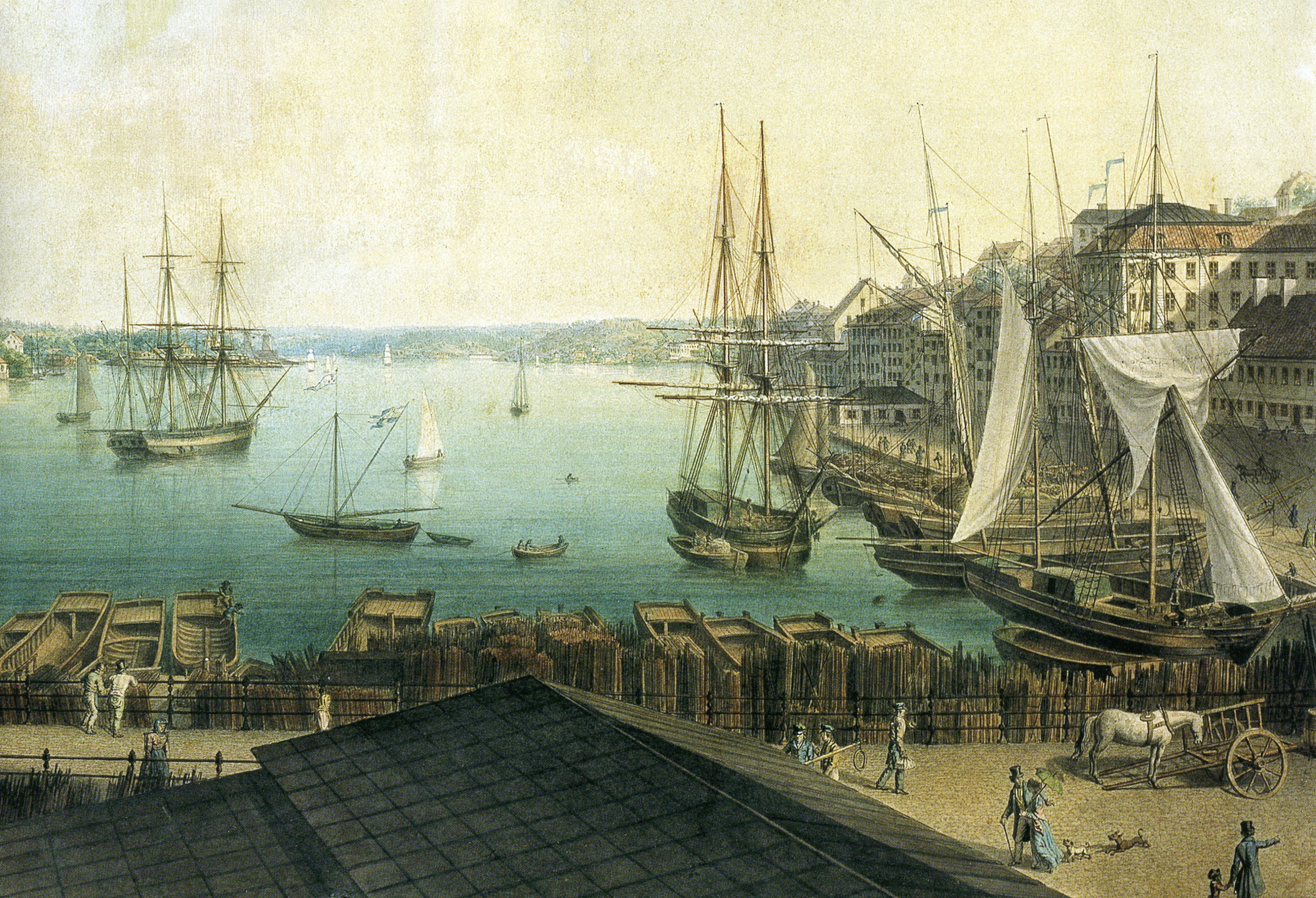
Slussen Järnvågen Julin

Events from the year 1842 in Sweden

== Incumbents ==
- Monarch – Charles XIV John

== Events ==
- 18 June - Compulsory Primary education for both sexes.
- The Garden Society of Gothenburg is opened.
- The theater monopoly of the Royal Dramatic Theatre in Stockholm is abolished.
- 28 May - Inauguration of the Mindre teatern, the first theater to be active within the city borders of Stockholm since the introduction of the monopoly of the Royal Dramatic Theatre 44 years earlier.
- The new Starrkärr Church is inaugurated.
- Rosen på Tistelön by Emilie Flygare-Carlén.
- Qvinnan med förmyndare (Woman with Guardian) by Sophie Bolander

== Births ==
- 5 January - Ellen Bergman, musician and women's right activist (died 1921)
- 11 February – Erik Gustaf Boström, landowner and politician (died 1907)
- 22 July - Maria Stenkula, educator (died 1932)
- 17 October - Gustaf Retzius, physician and anatomist (died 1919)
- 9 December – Carl David af Wirsén, poet, literary critic and the Swedish Academy's permanent secretary 1884-1912 (died 1912)
- Maria Ribbing, schoolteacher and philanthropist (died 1910)

== Deaths ==
- 27 February - Kisamor, natural doctor and herbalist (died 1788)
