= 1844 in Sweden =

- Decades: 1820s; 1830s; 1840s; 1850s; 1860s
- See also: Other events of 1844; Timeline of Swedish history

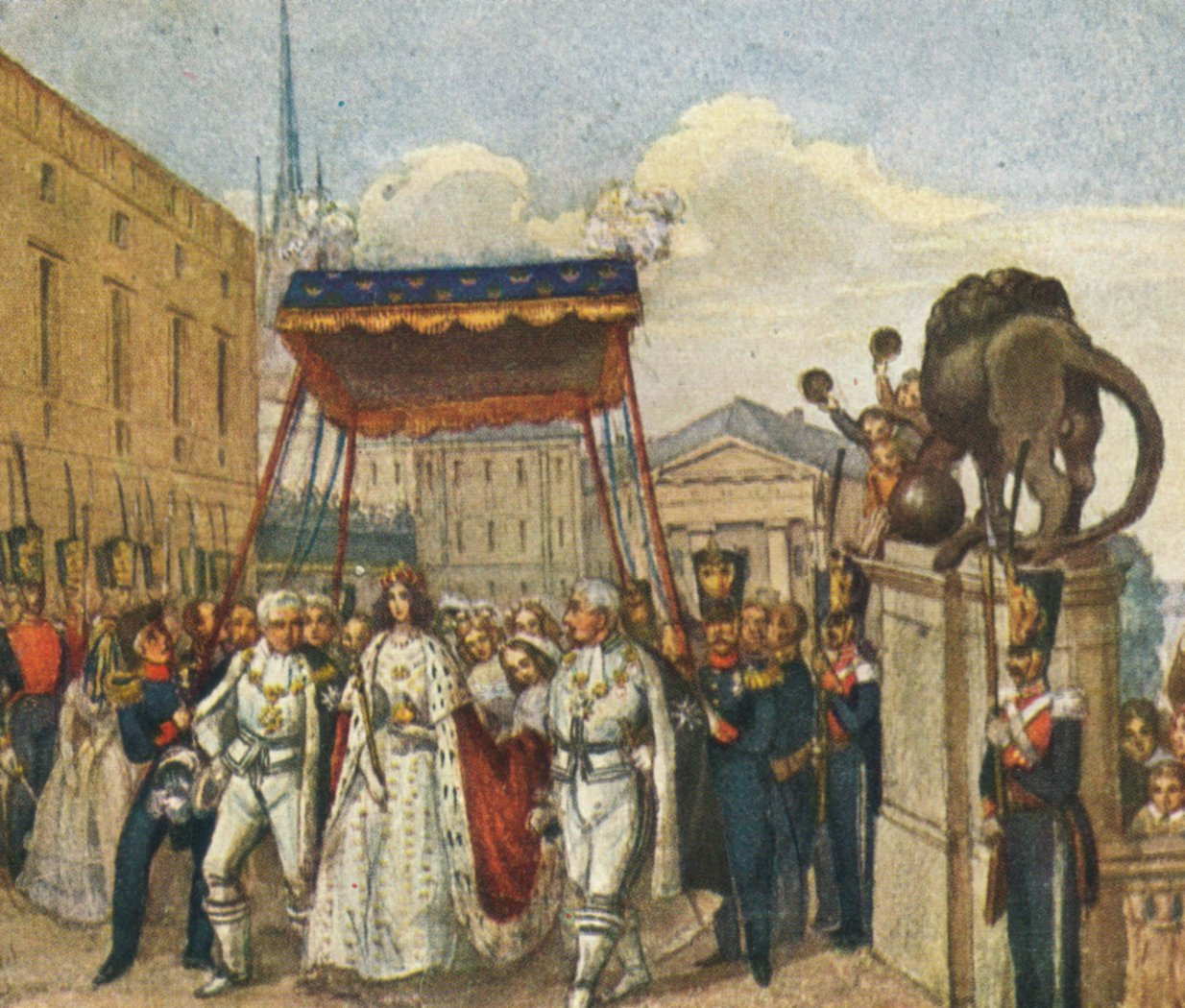

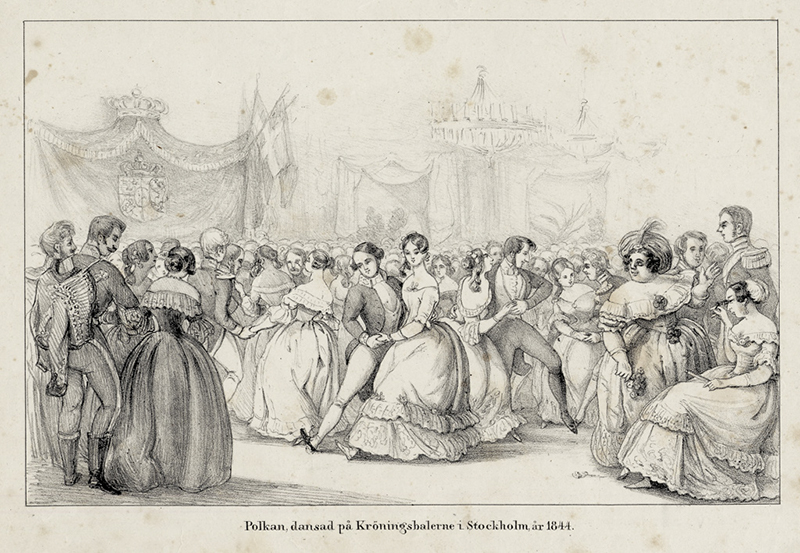

Events from the year 1844 in Sweden

== Incumbents ==
- Monarch – Charles XIV John then Oscar I

== Events ==
- - King Charles XIV John of Sweden dies and is succeeded by Oscar I of Sweden.
- 22 October - Swedish History Museum
- 1844 - the lyrics Du gamla, Du fria Written by Richard Dybeck later became Sweden's de facto national anthem.

== Births ==
- 23 February – Per Ekström, landscape painter (died 1935)
- 21 December – Olga Sandberg, ballerina (died 1926)
- 9 September – Ebba Boström, nurse and a philanthropist (died 1902)
- 9 November – Wilhelm von Gegerfelt, painter (dies 1920)
- 1 October – Wilhelmina von Hallwyl, collector and donor (died 1930)

== Deaths ==
- 8 March - Charles XIV John, King of Sweden (born 1763)
- 2 May - Karl Fredrik Dahlgren, poet (born 1791)
- 16 September – Magnus Brahe (1790–1844), soldier (born 1790)
- 14 October - Adèlaïde Victoire Hall, a Swedish-French artist (born 1772)
