= 1841 in Sweden =

- Years in Sweden: 1838 1839 1840 1841 1842 1843 1844
- Centuries: 18th century · 19th century · 20th century
- Decades: 1810s 1820s 1830s 1840s 1850s 1860s 1870s
- Years: 1838 1839 1840 1841 1842 1843 1844

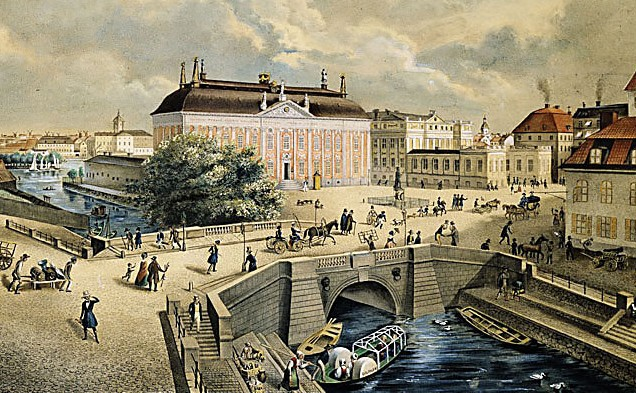

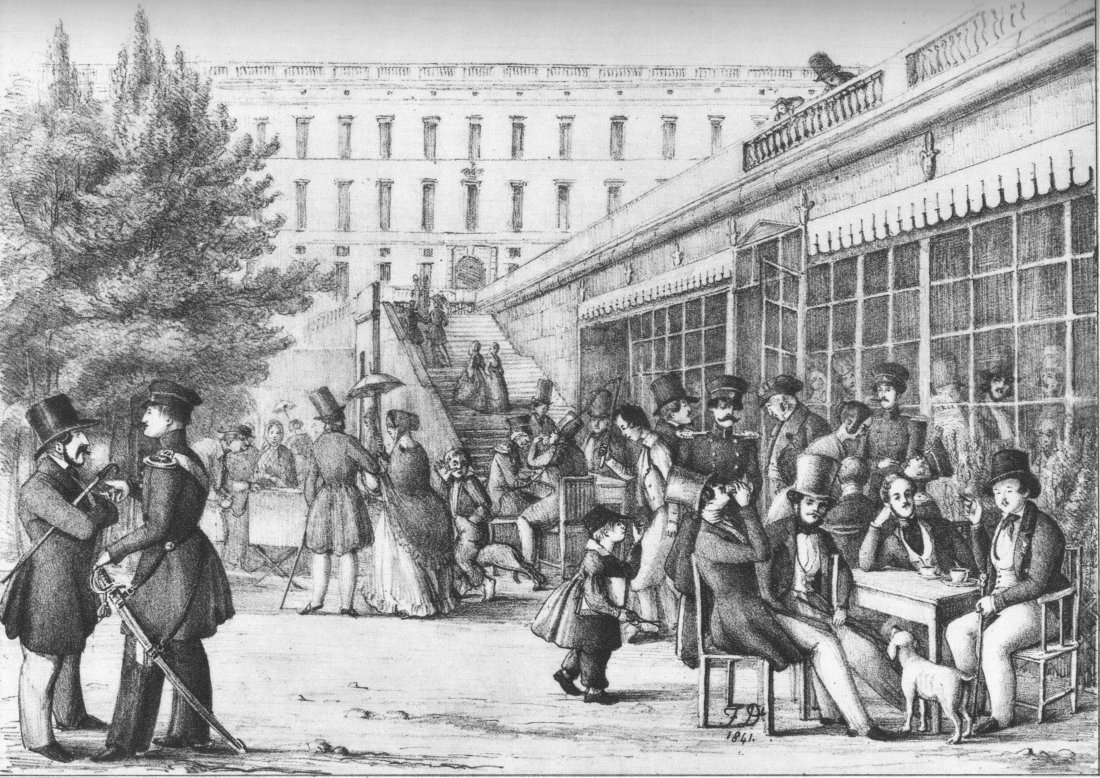

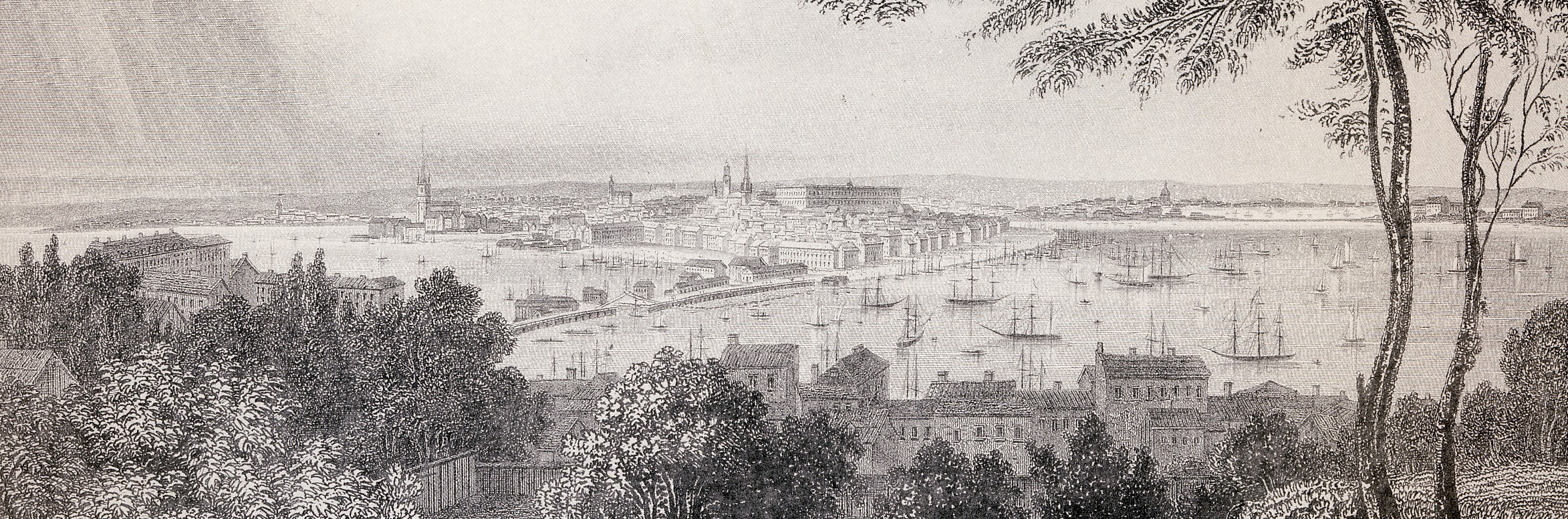
Stockholm in 1841

Events from the year 1841 in Sweden

== Incumbents ==
- Monarch – Charles XIV John

== Events ==
- 10 June - The Stocks punishment, already restricted and generally fallen of use, is banned.
- 6 August - Swedish Road Administration is founded.
- The state supported brothels London and Stadt Hamburg is closed.
- Wendela Hebbe, regarded a pioneer of female reporters, is employed as a reporter at Aftonbladet.
- First issue of the Barometern.
- Foundation of the shipping company Götaverken.
- The first issue of the Sundsvalls Tidning.
- The first of the von Schwerin Estate's Scandals attracts attention.
- Blommorna vid vägen, by Herman Sätherberg
- Diodes och Lydia by Wilhelmina Stålberg
- Kyrkoinvigningen i Hammarby by Emilie Flygare-Carlén
- En modig qvinnas händelserika lefnad, Antecknad av Henne Sjelf by Anna Carlström
- Qvinnan utan förmyndare (Woman without Guardian) by Amelie von Strussenfelt
- Inauguration of the Carolina Rediviva

== Births ==
- 27 January – Selma Jacobsson, photographer (died 1899)
- 19 February – Elfrida Andrée, first female organist (died 1929)
- 18 June - Hedvig Willman, actress (died 1887)
- 24 August – Anna Hierta-Retzius, women's right activist (died 1924)
- 8 September - Carl Snoilsky, poet (died 1903)
- 29 December - Rosalie Fougelberg, dentist (died 1911)

== Deaths ==
- 12 January – Märta Helena Reenstierna, diarist (born 1753)
- 19 February – Ulrika Carolina Widström, poet (born 1764)
- 17 September - Erik Djurström, stage actor (born 1787)
- 28 October - Johann Arfvedson, chemist who discovered the chemical element lithium (born 1792)
- – Mariana Koskull, royal mistress (born 1785)
- - Christina Fredenheim, singer (born 1762)
