= 1838 in Sweden =

- Years in Sweden: 1835 1836 1837 1838 1839 1840 1841
- Centuries: 18th century · 19th century · 20th century
- Decades: 1800s 1810s 1820s 1830s 1840s 1850s 1860s
- Years: 1835 1836 1837 1838 1839 1840 1841

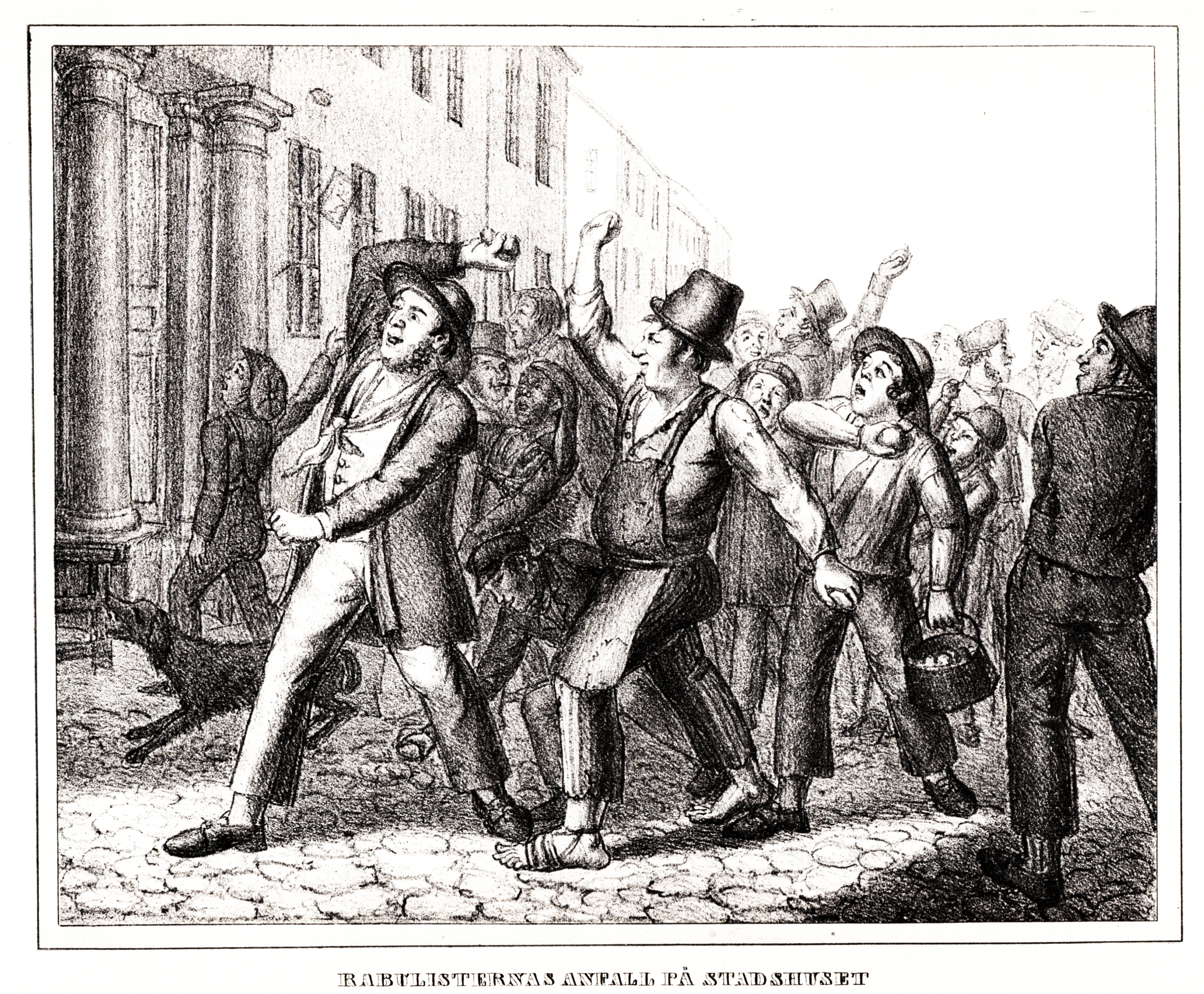
Rabulist riots.

Events from the year 1838 in Sweden

== Incumbents ==
- Monarch – Charles XIV John

== Events ==
- 7 March – Jenny Lind as her breakthrough in Der Freischütz by Carl Maria von Weber at the Royal Swedish Opera in Stockholm.
- The state licensed brothels, London and Stadt Hamburg, open in the capital in an attempt by the city authorities to control the spread of sexual disease.
- - Rabulist riots
- - First issue of Borås Tidning
- - First issue of Östgöta Correspondenten
- - Foundation of the philanthropic sewing society by Emilie Petersen.

== Births ==
- 12 April - Axel Elmlund, ballet dancer and stage actor (died 1901)
- 20 July – Paul Peter Waldenström, theologian (died 1917)
- 14 September - Hanna Ouchterlony, Salvationist (died 1924)
- 14 September - Betty Pettersson, first female university student (died 1885)
- 9 October - Hilda Petrini, watch maker (died 1895)
- 20 November - Hedvig Raa-Winterhjelm, actress and drama teacher (died 1907)
- 4 December - Hanna Winge, painter (died 1896)

== Deaths ==
- 23 March – Michael Anckarsvärd (born 1742)
