= 1846 in Sweden =

- Decades: 1820s; 1830s; 1840s; 1850s; 1860s
- See also: Other events of 1846; Timeline of Swedish history

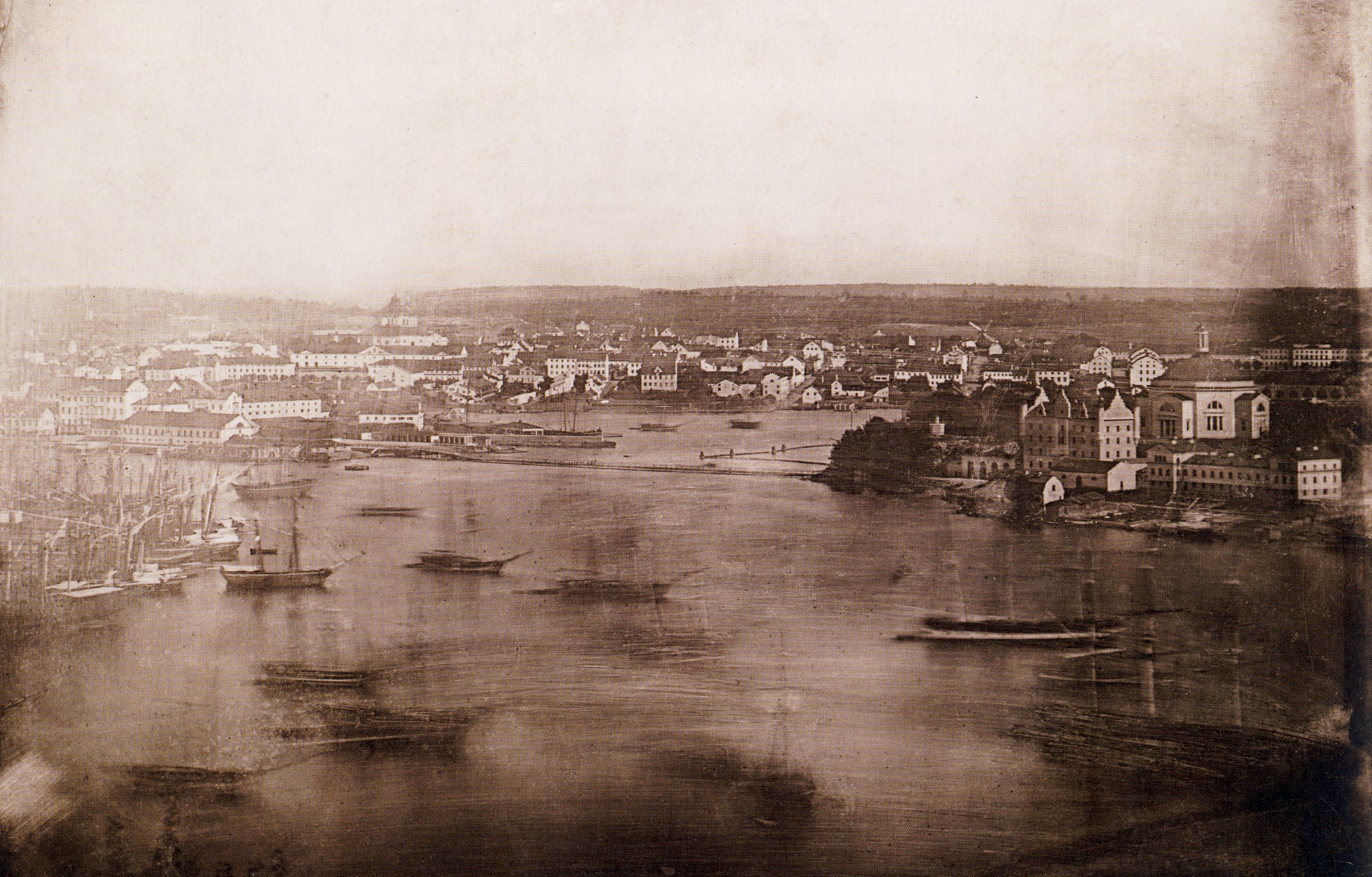
Stockholm c. 1846

Events from the year 1846 in Sweden

== Incumbents ==
- Monarch – Oscar I

== Events ==
- 28 June: The Church of Sweden Härnösand Cathedral is inaugurated.
- December 22 - The guild system in Sweden is abolished by the Fabriks och Handtwerksordning and Handelsordningen.
- Trade and craft professions are opened to all unmarried women.
- Adolf Eugene von Rosen and Georg Theodor Policron von Chiewitz proposes a regulation of Gamla stan.
- The Swedish History Museum is founded.
- Gothenburg becomes the first Swedish city to be lit up by voal gas.
- Den broderade plånboken by August Blanche
- Dubbelgångaren av Fjodor Dostojevskij
- Engelbrekt och hans dalkarlar by August Blanche
- Läkaren by August Blanche
- Magister Bläckstadius eller giftermåls-annonsen by August Blanche
- Rika morbror by August Blanche
- Syskonbarnen eller Hofgunst och Folkgunst by Karl Kullberg
- Torparen och hans omgifning by Sophie von Knorring

== Births ==
- 26 February – Amanda Forsberg, ballerina
- 16 March – Gösta Mittag-Leffler, mathematician (died 1927)
- 28 April – Johan Oskar Backlund, astronomer (died 1916)
- 5 May – Lars Magnus Ericsson, inventor, entrepreneur and founder of telephone equipment manufacturer Ericsson (incorporated as Telefonaktiebolaget LM Ericsson (died 1926)
- May - Nanna Hoffman factory owner (died 1920)
- 22 December – Andreas Hallén, composer, conductor and music teacher (died 1925)

== Deaths ==
- 28 January - Sara Wacklin, writer and educator (born 1790)
- 8 April - Augusta von Fersen, courtier (born 1754)
- 2 November – Esaias Tegnér, poet (born 1782)
- 18 December – Emilie Högqvist, actress and royal mistress (born 1812)
- Helena Spinacuta, actor and acrobat (born 1766)
