= 1845 in Sweden =

- Decades: 1820s; 1830s; 1840s; 1850s; 1860s
- See also: Other events of 1845; Timeline of Swedish history

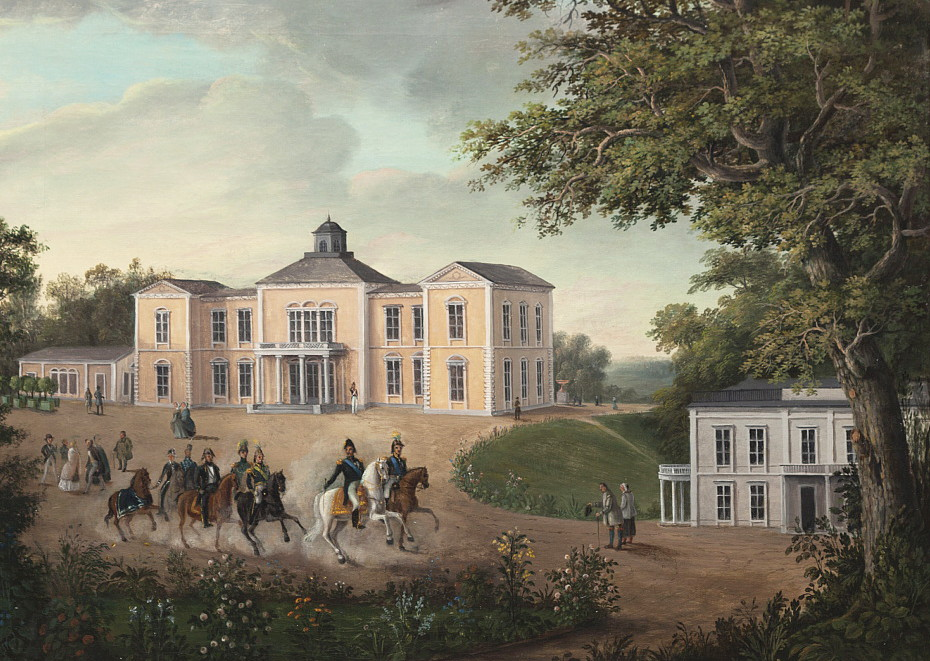

Events from the year 1845 in Sweden

== Incumbents ==
- Monarch – Oscar I

== Events ==
- Brita Sofia Hesselius opens a daguerreotype photographic studio in Karlstad and likely becomes the first professional female photographer in Sweden.
- Attarp murders
- Equal inheritance for sons and daughters (in the absence of a will).

== Births ==
- Sigrid Björkegren, entrepreneur (died 1936)
- 11 January - Albert Victor Backlund, mathematician and physicist (died 1922)
- 12 April – Gustaf Cederström, painter (died 1933)
- 1 July - Ika Peyron
- 10 August - Willgodt Theophil Odhner, engineer (died 1905)
- 26 November - Johan August Ekman
- Gustaf de Laval, engineer (1845-1913)

== Deaths ==
- 4 June - Lasse-Maja
