= 1922 in Sweden =

- Decades: 1900s; 1910s; 1920s; 1930s; 1940s
- See also: Other events of 1922; Timeline of Swedish history

Events from the year 1922 in Sweden

== Incumbents ==
- Monarch – Gustaf V
- Prime Minister – Hjalmar Branting

== Events ==
- 4–12 February – The Nordic Games take place in Stockholm.
- 27 August – 1922 Swedish prohibition referendum
- 17 November – The Swedish Ice Hockey Association is founded in Stockholm by representatives from seven clubs.
- Date unknown – Dissolution of the Allmänna Barnhuset.
- Date unknown – Foundation of the Kvinnliga medborgarskolan vid Fogelstad.

== Births ==
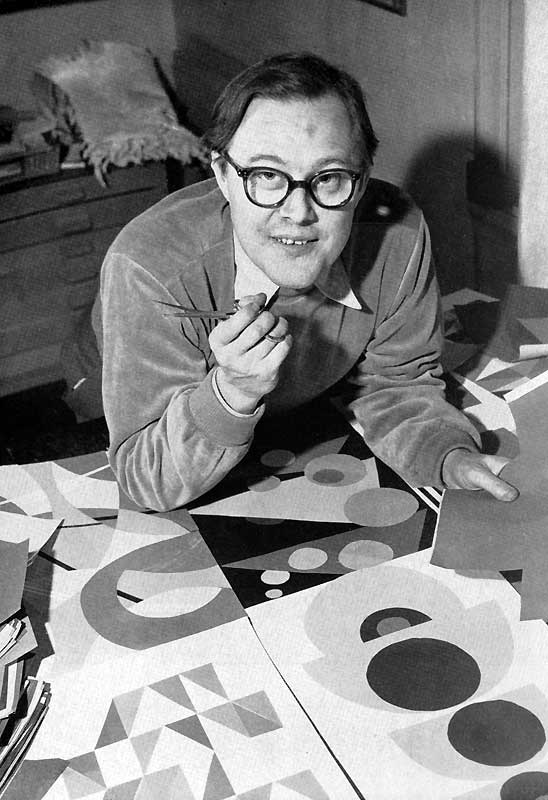
Sandro Key-Åberg

- 17 March – Gustav Freij, wrestler (died 1973).
- 6 May – Sandro Key-Åberg, writer (died 1991).
- 1 June – Baron Povel Ramel, musician and entertainer (died 2007)
- 10 June – Ann-Britt Leyman, athlete (died 2013).
- 1 August – Kjell Hjertsson, footballer (died 2013).
- 8 October – Nils Liedholm, footballer (died 2007).

== Deaths ==
- 2 July – Gurli Åberg, stage actress (born 1843)
- Maria Andersson (businesswoman) (born 1837)
