= 1777 in Sweden =

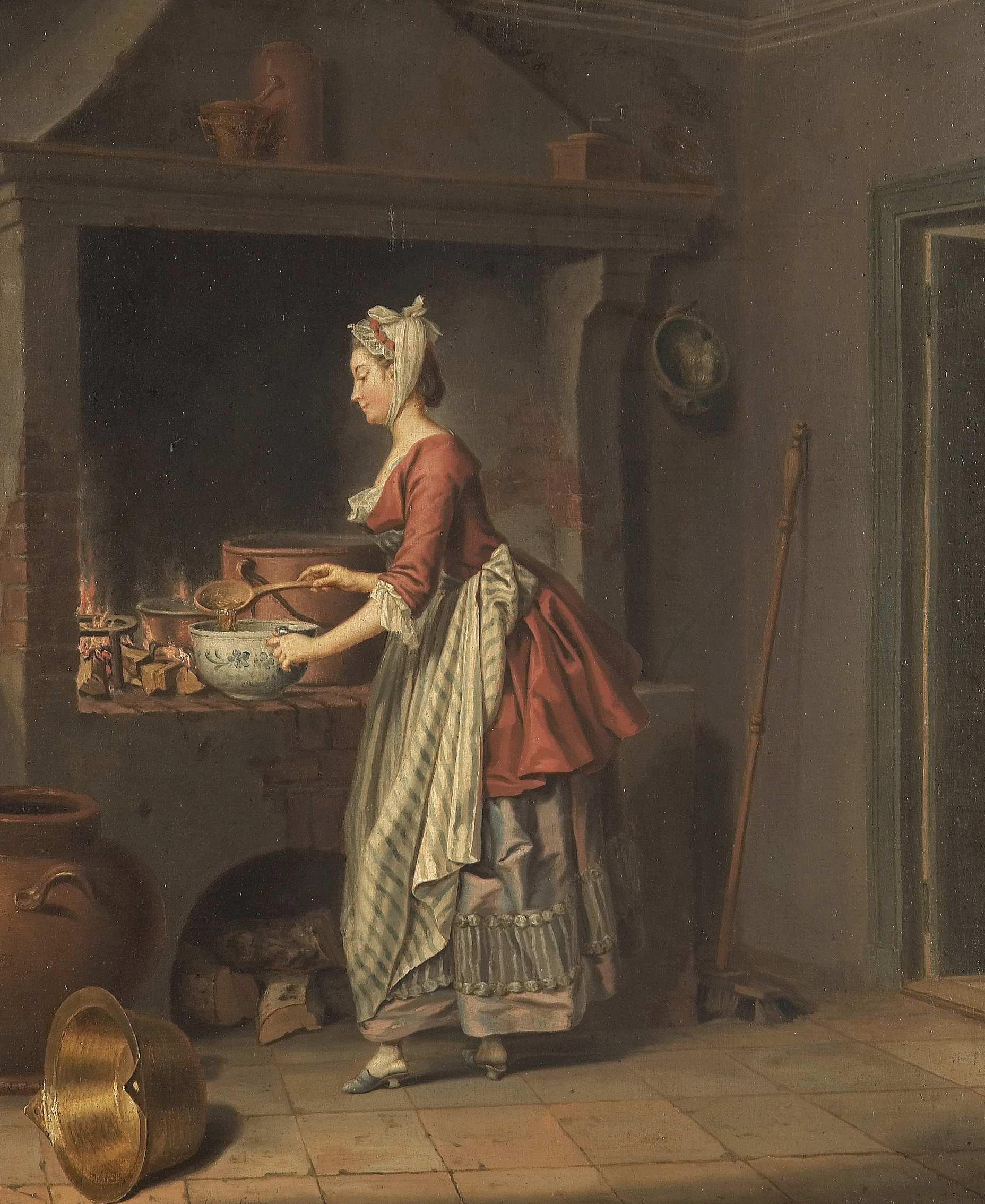

Events from the year 1777 in Sweden

== Incumbents ==
- Monarch – Gustav III

== Events ==
- 7 June - Gustav III visits Catherine the Great in Russia.
- - The construction of the Strömsholm Canal begins.
- - The 1711 regulations of midwives, with demands of a license after approval of the medical authorities, until then in practice only enforced in the capital, are enforced in the entire country.

== Births ==
- 15 June - Hedda Hjortsberg, ballerina (died 1867)
- - Hedvig Amalia Charlotta Klinckowström, miniaturist (died 1810)
- - Per Krafft the Younger, painter (died 1863)
- - Mateli Magdalena Kuivalatar, folk singer (died 1846)
- Louise von Fersen, courtier (died 1849)
- Eva Fundin, actress and dancer (died 1800)

== Deaths ==
- 6 April - Jacob Johan Anckarström the Elder, knight and colonel (died 1729)
- 17 November - Johan Stålbom, painter (died 1712)
- Louise Du Londel, actor (born 1740)
- Ulrica Catharina Stromberg, courtier (born 1710)
