= 1847 in Sweden =

- Decades: 1820s; 1830s; 1840s; 1850s; 1860s
- See also: Other events of 1847; Timeline of Swedish history

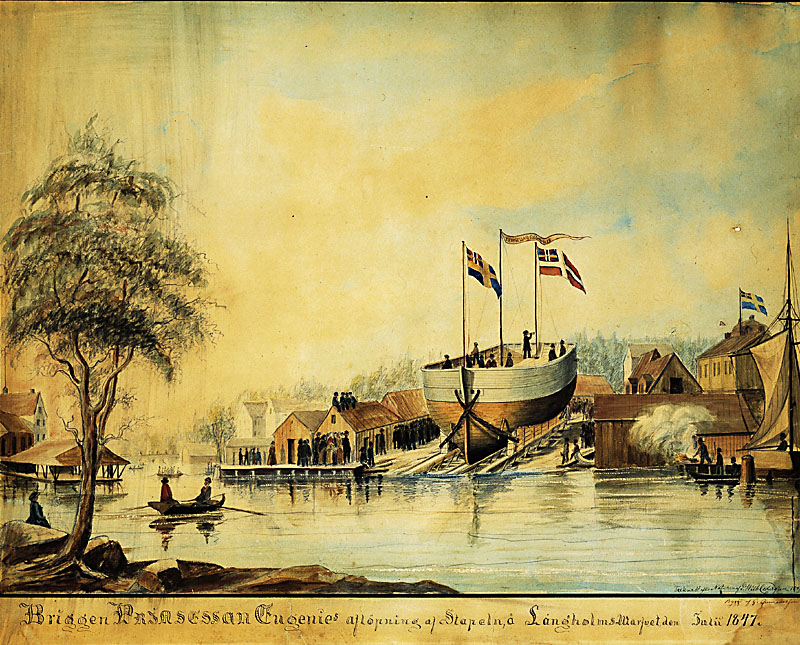
Mälarvarvet 1847

Events from the year 1847 in Sweden

== Incumbents ==
- Monarch – Oscar I

== Events ==
- 18 January – Brottslingarne by Emelie Flygare Carlén on Mindre teatern in Stockholm.
- 24 May – Hittebarnet by August Blanche on Djurgårdsteatern in Stockholm.
- 13 December – Mor och döttrar eller Namnförvexlingen by Jeanette Stjernström in Mindre teatern in Stockholm.
- Jenny Lind returns to Sweden with a great tour.
- The first bureau for registration as medical examination of prostitutes is opened in the capital: from 1859, all prostitutes are forced to registration.
- Poor Care Regulation of 1847 replace the Beggar Regulation of 1642 and reorganize the poor relief system. Rotegång is banned for children.
- The Åhlinska skolan is founded in Stockholm by Karin Åhlin and her sisters.
- Aurore Storckenfeldt open the Storckenfeldtska skolan.
- Slavery is abolished on the Swedish colony of Saint Barthélemy.
- The perfume and cosmetic company Antoinette W Nording is founded by Antoinette Nording.
- - 1846 och 1946 by August Blanche
- - Barnen i nya skogen by Frederick Marryat.
- - De begge aristokraterna by Wilhelmina Stålberg
- - Flickan i Stadsträdgården by August Blanche
- - Herr Dardanell och hans upptåg på landet by August Blanche
- - Stockholm, Westerås och Upsala by August Blanche
- - Tegnérs minne by August Blanche
- - Vålnaden by August Blanche

== Births ==
- 1 May – Hildegard Björck, first Swedish woman to complete an academic degree (died 1920)
- 12 June – Hulda Lundin, tailor and educator (died 1921)
- 14 August – Karl Oskar Medin, paediatrician (died 1927)
- 20 October – Oscar Swahn, shooter (died 1927)
- Anna Rönström, educator and mathematician (died 1920)
- Sophie Cysch, singer (died 1917)

== Deaths ==
- 9 February - Ulrica Eleonora Rålamb, politically active countess and spy (born 1769)
- 17 April - Maria Franck, actress (born 1769)
- 23 April – Erik Gustaf Geijer, historian, poet, philosopher, and composer (born 1783)
- 18 June - Lisette Stenberg, actress and pianist (born 1770)
- 14 August – Frans Michael Franzén, writer (born 1772)
- 25 December – Carl Gustaf von Brinkman, diplomat (born 1764)
- - Amelie von Strussenfelt, writer (born 1803)
