= 1923 in Sweden =

- Decades: 1900s; 1910s; 1920s; 1930s; 1940s
- See also: Other events of 1923; Timeline of Swedish history

Events from the year 1923 in Sweden

== Incumbents ==
- Monarch – Gustaf V
- Prime Minister – Hjalmar Branting, Ernst Trygger

== Events ==
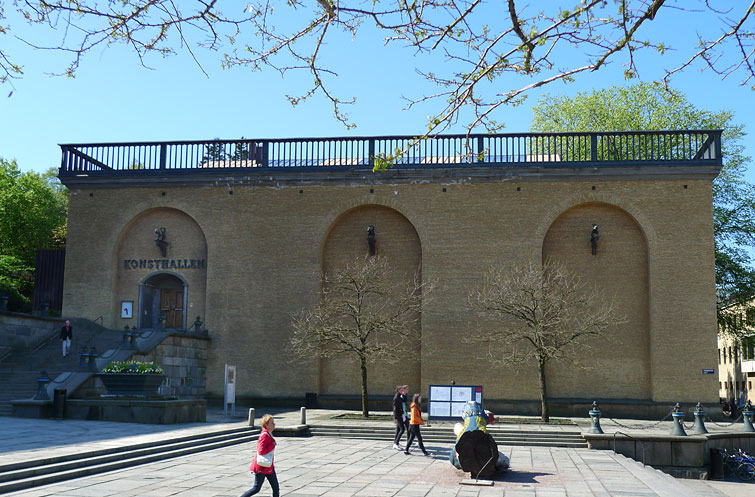
Göteborgs Konsthall was built as an art exhibition hall for the jubilee fair of Gothenburg in 1923.

- 8 May – 30 September – The Liseberg amusement park opens in Gothenburg, Sweden, as part of the Gothenburg Tercentennial Jubilee Exposition.
- The Equal Competence Law, granting men and women equal rights to all public positions and professions, is passed in Sweden.

== Births ==
- 5 June – Bertil Haase, modern pentathlete (died 2014).
- 11 February – Ruth Forsling, activist and politician (died 1985).
- 25 July – Maria Gripe, writer (died 2007).
- 13 October – Viking Palm, wrestler (died 2009).
- 20 November – Gunnar Åkerlund, canoer (died 2006).
- 30 December – Carl-Göran Ekerwald, novelist, essayist, literary critic and teacher.

== Deaths ==
- 19 January - Amalia Eriksson, businesswoman (born 1824)
- 20 March - Louise Flodin, journalist (born 1828)
- 8 November - Alfhild Agrell, writer (born 1849)
- 7 December - Clementine Swartz, actress (born 1835)
- 11 December - Kata Dalström, politician (born 1835)
