= 1764 in Sweden =

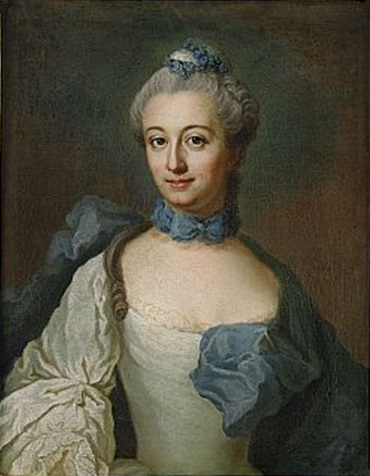
Fredrika Staël by Stålbom

Events from the year 1764 in Sweden

== Incumbents ==
- Monarch – Adolf Frederick

== Events ==
- Population data is published for the first time. Sweden's population is 2,383,113 people.
- The finances of the state forces the government of the Hats (party) to assemble the Riksdag of the Estates.
- Louis Frossard and Marie-Renée Frossard are engaged at the French Theatre in Stockholm.
- St Lucia day celebration was started at a Manor in the Västergötland province

== Births ==
- 8 February - Rudolf Cederström, naval commander (died 1833)
- 25 February - Carl Gustaf von Brinkman, poet and diplomat (died 1847)
- 3 September - Karl Adolf Boheman, mystic and freemason (died 1831)
- 24 November – Ulrika Carolina Widström, poet (died 1840)
- - Samuel Ahlgren, actor (died 1816)

== Deaths ==
- January 18 - Samuel Troilius, arch bishop (born 1706)
