= 1840 in Sweden =

- Decades: 1820s; 1830s; 1840s; 1850s; 1860s
- See also: Other events of 1840; Timeline of Swedish history

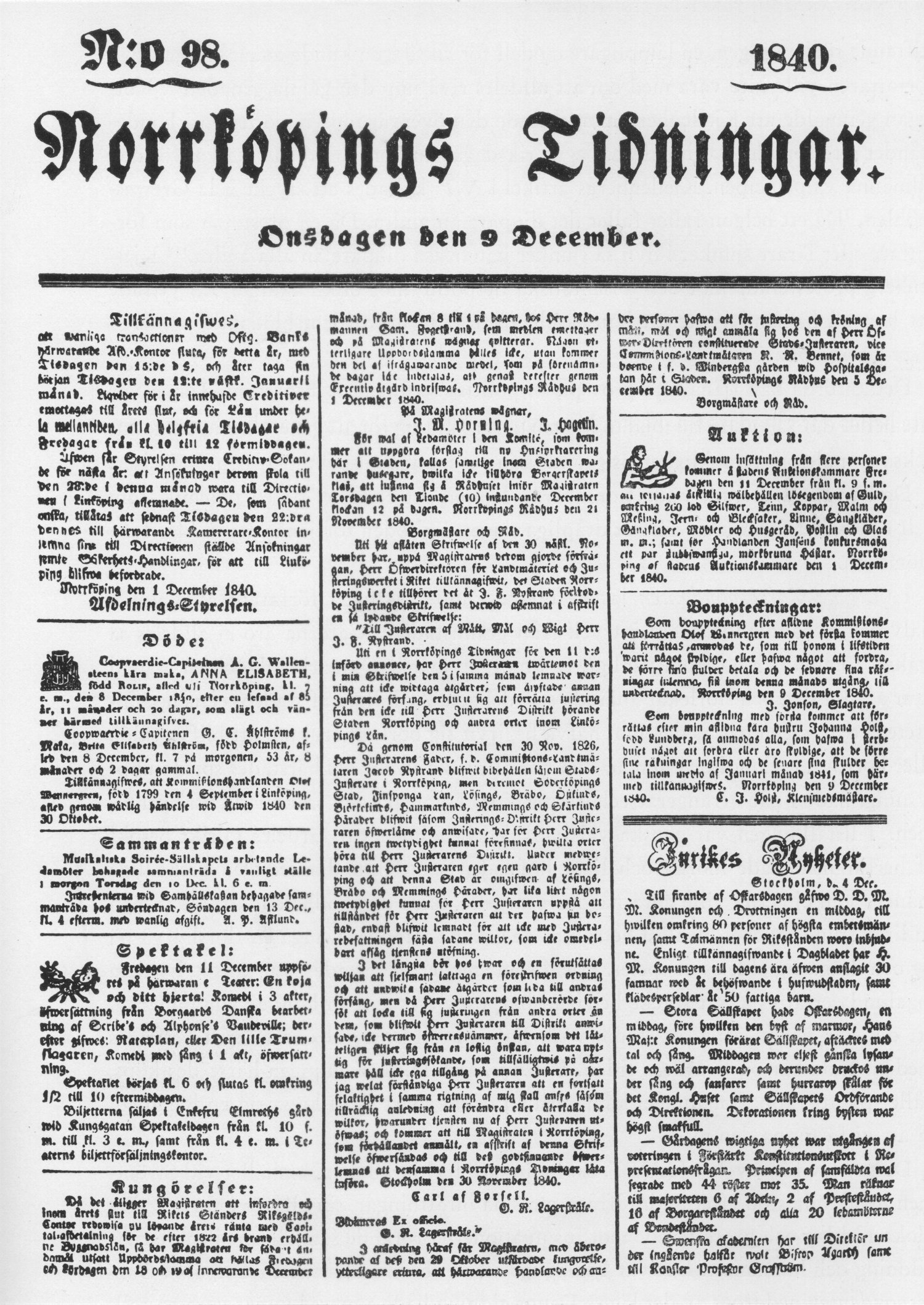
Norrköpings Tidningar in 1840

Events from the year 1840 in Sweden

== Incumbents ==
- Monarch – Charles XIV John

== Events ==
- The Riksdag of 1840-1841 was a liberal breakthrough. A decision was taken to introduce primary education.
- Prison cell jails are introduced.
- Kockums Naval Solutions is founded.

== Arts and literature ==
- Morianen, eller Holstein-Gottorpiska huset i Sverige by Magnus Jacob Crusenstolpe
- Nyare dikter by Wilhelm von Braun
- Samlade vitterhetsförsök by Ulrika Carolina Widström
- Sara Widebeck by August Blanche

== Births ==
- 7 February – Ida Göthilda Nilsson, sculptor (died 1920)
- 13 June - Augusta Lundin, fashion designer (died 1919)
- 18 October – Hjalmar Edgren, linguist (died 1903)
- 8 December - Sofia Gumaelius, business person (died 1915)
- 21 December - Hilda Lund, ballerina (died 1911)

== Deaths ==
- Lolotte Forssberg, possible daughter of king Adolf Frederick of Sweden (born 1766)
- Ebba Modée, courtier (born 1775)
