= 1924 in Sweden =

- Decades: 1900s; 1910s; 1920s; 1930s; 1940s
- See also: Other events of 1924; Timeline of Swedish history

Events from the year 1924 in Sweden

== Incumbents ==
- Monarch – Gustaf V
- Prime Minister – Ernst Trygger, Hjalmar Branting

== Births ==
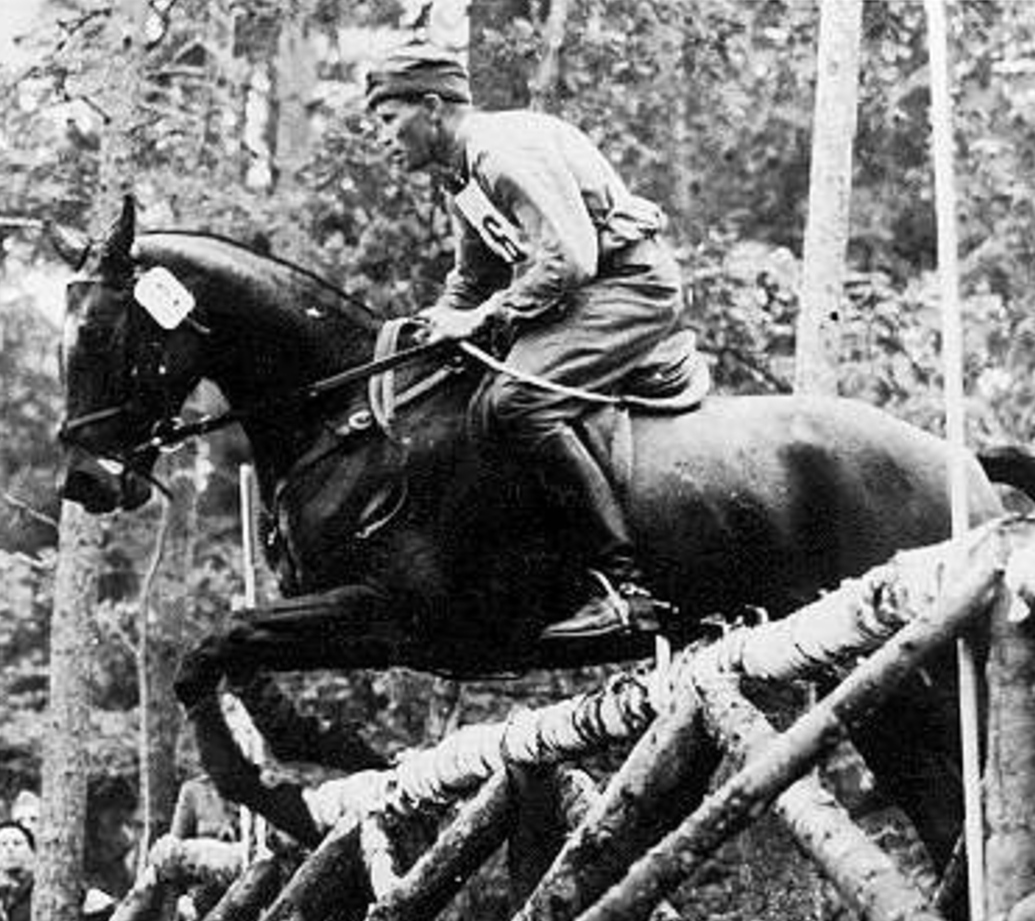
Petrus Kastenman, Olympic champion in equestrian (eventing).

- 1 January – Lennart Magnusson, fencer (died 2011).
- 26 January – Alice Babs, singer and actress (died 2014)
- 7 March – Sven Hjertsson, footballer (died 1999).
- 3 June – Torsten Wiesel, neuroscientist
- 29 June – Eivor Alm, cross-country skier (died 2011).
- 13 August – Meta Velander, actress (died 2025)
- 15 August – Petrus Kastenman, equestrian (died 2013).
- 5 November – Ingrid Sandahl, gymnast (died 2011).

== Deaths ==
- 27 February - Carolina Östberg, opera singer (born 1853)
- 28 February - Hanna Ouchterlony, Salvationist (born 1838)
- 13 May - Wilhelmine Schröder, royal favorite (born 1839)
- 21 December - Anna Hierta-Retzius, women's right activist (born 1841)
