= 1919 in Sweden =

- Decades: 1890s; 1900s; 1910s; 1920s; 1930s
- See also: Other events of 1919; Timeline of Swedish history

Events from the year 1919 in Sweden.

== Incumbents ==
- Monarch – Gustaf V
- Prime Minister - Nils Edén

== Events ==
- 24 May - Women suffrage is approved by parliament and are to be used for the first time in the 1921 election.
- 18 September - AB Svensk Filmindustri (SF) is founded.
- Åland Islands dispute escalated further after an unofficial referendum. was held in June. 91.5% of Alanders wanted to reunite with Sweden in the referendum.

== Births ==
- 4 July - Gerd Hagman, actress (died 2011)
- 17 August - Ulla Ryghe, film editor (died 2011 in Canada)
- 21 November - Gert Fredriksson, canoer (died 2006)
- 31 December - Folke Alnevik, athlete

== Deaths ==
- 22 January - Carl Larsson, painter (born 1853)
- 20 February - Augusta Lundin, fashion designer (born 1840)
- 29 July - Martina Bergman-Österberg, physical education instructor (born 1849)
- 10 September - Helena Munktell, composer (born 1852)
- 3 November - Alina Jägerstedt, trade unionist and social democrat (born 1853)
- Rosalie Sjöman, photographer (born 1833)
