= 1917 in Sweden =

- Decades: 1890s; 1900s; 1910s; 1920s; 1930s
- See also: Other events of 1917; Timeline of Swedish history

Events from the year 1917 in Sweden

== Incumbents ==
- Monarch – Gustaf V
- Prime Minister - Hjalmar Hammarskjöld, Carl Swartz, and Nils Edén

== Events ==
- 10–18 February – The Nordic Games take place in Stockholm.
- 1 and 16 September: The 1917 Swedish general election result in the fall of the rightwing government in favor of the liberals.
- The child serial killer Hilda Nilsson is put on trial.
- The movie A Man There Was has its premier

== Births ==
- 21 January – Erling Persson, founder of H&M (died 2002)
- 3 February – Arne Sucksdorff, film director (died 2001)
- 25 June – Nils Karlsson, Olympic cross-country skier (died 2012)
- 11 July – Per Carleson, épée fencer (died 2004)

== Deaths ==
- 14 July – Paul Peter Waldenström, theologian (born 1838)
- 10 August - Hilda Nilsson, serial killer (born 1876)
- 5 November - Louise Hammarström, chemist (born 1849)
- Wilhelmina Lagerholm, photographer (born 1826)
- Sophie Cysch, singer (born 1847)
