= 1921 in Sweden =

- Decades: 1900s; 1910s; 1920s; 1930s; 1940s
- See also: Other events of 1921; Timeline of Swedish history

Events from the year 1921 in Sweden

== Incumbents ==
- Monarch – Gustaf V
- Prime Minister – Gerhard Louis De Geer, Oscar von Sydow, Hjalmar Branting

== Events ==
- 30 January – IFK Uppsala defeats Berliner SC, 4–1, in front of 2 022 spectators at the Stockholm Stadium when the first ice hockey game in Sweden is played.
- 10–26 September – the 1921 Swedish general election, which was the first Swedish election held under universal suffrage. The first women are elected to the parliament: Nelly Thüring (Social Democrat), Agda Östlund (Social Democrat) Elisabeth Tamm (liberal) and Bertha Wellin (Conservative) in the Lower chamber, and Kerstin Hesselgren in the Upper chamber.
- Foundation of Svenska Kvinnors Medborgarförbund.

== Births ==
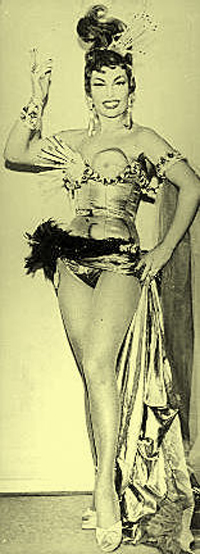
Git Gay.

- 3 January – Gunnar Eriksson, cross country skier (died 1982).
- 22 February – Sune Andersson, footballer (died 2002).
- 29 April – Bert Lundin, union leader (died 2018)
- 13 July – Git Gay, actress, singer and revue director (died 2007).
- 31 July – Tore Sjöstrand, runner (died 2011).
- 3 August – Birgitta Arman, actress (died 2007).
- 15 September – Nils Rydström, fencer (died 2018)
- 6 October – Egon Jönsson, footballer (died 2000).

== Deaths ==
- 11 March – Hulda Lundin, tailor and educator (born 1847)
- 20 November – Christina Nilsson, Countess de Casa Miranda, operatic soprano (born 1843)
- – Ellen Bergman, musician (born 1842)
- – Lilly Engström, civil servant (born 1843)
- - Hilda Sandels, opera singer (born 1830)
