= Augusta Braunerhjelm =

Swedish playwright and writer

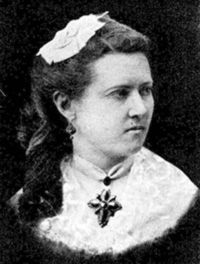
Augusta Braunerhjelm

Beata Fredrika Augusta Braunerhjelm (2 November 1839 in Edebo församling – 1929), was a Swedish playwright and writer.

She was the daughter of chamberlain noble Samuel August Braunerhielm and countess Sofia Eleonora Fredrika Taube. She is most known for her comedy play Kusinerna (Cousins), which had its premier on the Royal Dramatic Theatre in Stockholm in 1870 and remained a success for several years. She was awarded the second prize of the Swedish Academy for her tragedy Kåre in 1879. She was recommended for her descriptions of characters.

== Works ==
- "Kusinerna", 1870
- "Hvem?", 1877
- "Bror Görans unga hustru",
- "Blodshämden", femaktskådespel (1879)
- "Kåre"
- "Studier efter naturen. Teckningar från Italien", (1883)
- "Nya teckningar från Italien", (1883)
- "I den tiden —" (1898)
- "I unga dagar" (1900)

== Sources ==
- B F Augusta Braunerhjelm, urn:sbl:16903, Svenskt biografiskt lexikon (art av Nils Molin.), hämtad 2015-05-08.
