= Sofia Maria Ekwall =

Swedish murderer

Sofia Maria Ekwall (1826–1897) was a Swedish woman judged for two murders and for the murder of her father. The murder was one of the most known in the 19th century in Sweden, and Ekwall was one of the infamous female murderers in Swedish history before Anna Månsdotter.

== Background ==
Sofia Maria was the eldest daughter of Per Ludvig Ekwall, son of the statesman Christopher Retzius Ekwall, a wealthy man described as an honest but depressive person. In 1844, Per Ekwall had moved with his wife Hedvig Christina and six children to the manor Attarp in Småland, south of the city Linköping in Östergötland.

== The murders ==
On Wednesday 28 May 1845, estate owner Ekwall became ill. The day after, he seemed to have recovered, but eight days later, his health deteriorated, and he was confined to bed. Suddenly, the maid Maja Stina Forsberg and one of the younger daughters of the family also became ill. Maja Stina Forsberg died the same night.

A doctor was called, discovered that the illness had been caused by poisoning, and administered antidote to Ekwall and the child. A post mortem was made of the body of Forsberg, and the result confirmed that she had been poisoned. The condition of Ekwall then improved, and he made good recovery. After having a cup of oat soup, however, he became ill again, and the same night, he died. The child, however, recovered completely.

== The first arrests ==
The widow of Ekwall, Hedvig Christina, now pointed out the maid Hedda Thorman as her husband's killer. She claimed that Thorman had given birth to a child in secret and killed it with the help of Maja Stina Forsberg, after which Thorman had killed Forsberg to preserve her secret. The question then remained, how Ekwall and his little daughter had consumed the poison.

Hedda Thorman was questioned, but it did not seem likely that she was guilty of the murder of Ekwall. She was, however, arrested and remanded in custody because of the separate accusation of having murdered the child she had allegedly given birth to. In connection to this, the eighteen-year-old Vilhelm Ekwall, son of the dead Per Ekwall, was arrested and remanded in custody as he was suspected of being the father of Thorman's alleged child. He was also now seen as a likely suspect for the murder of his father.

== The second arrests ==
It was then established that Ekwall had been poisoned by the soup he had consumed. This had been prepared by Hedvig Christina Ekwall herself. Maja Stina Forsberg had scraped and eaten the leftovers from the pot, and the little daughter had then eaten from her father's plate.

The police also discovered that the eldest daughter, Sofia Maria, had sent for arsenic from the apothecary, with the intention of removing stains from her silk-dress. Vilhelm Ekwall was then released from jail.

The everyday life of the Ekwall family was investigated. It was discovered that Per Ekwall had been an alcoholic and a domestic tyrant. He had refused to give his daughter Sofia Maria permission to marry her fiancé, which was now thought to be the motive for her to poison him. Maja Stina Forsberg and the child were believed to have been poisoned by mistake. Sofia Maria was then arrested for the murder of her father.

After having spent some time in jail, Sofia Maria made a confession. She said that she had prepared a sandwich with poison in the presence of her mother and, with her consent, given it to Maja Stina Forsberg. But she denied that her mother had taken an active part in the murders.

Hedvig Christina Ekwall was taken in for questioning, and more and more incriminating circumstances became attributed to her, but no matter how many new statements were laid before her, she refused to admit anything. She was allowed to remain free to take care of her children.

Sofia Maria then changed her mind and started to point out her mother as an active accomplice in the murders; she now claimed that she and her mother had murdered her father together. Hedvig Christina Ekwall sternly denied her daughter's accusations, and reproached Sofia Maria for trying to put the blame on her own mother.

Sofia Maria Ekwall continued her confession and said that her mother had poisoned the soup, which made her father ill and killed Forsberg, and that she had poisoned the oat soup which had killed her father in his sick-bed after he had begun to recover from the first poisoning.

== Trial and verdict ==
Hedvig Christina Ekwall refused to admit anything; no matter how many accusations, statements and incriminating circumstances were put before her, she was stern in her denial, and as there was no physical proof, she was released.

Hedda Thorman, who, during her time in prison had first admitted and then retracted her confession of having given birth to, and killed, an infant in secret, was also freed; the authorities now suspected that it was Sofia Maria who had done this.

Sofia Maria Ekwall was judged guilty of murder of her father and of Maja Stina Forsberg, and was sentenced to death. After having asked the King of Sweden for mercy, however, her sentence was changed to twenty eight days on bread and water, followed by life imprisonment. She was finally released from prison in 1876. Hedvig Christina Ekwall remained on Attarp mansion until 1849.
