= 1920 in Sweden =

- Decades: 1900s; 1910s; 1920s; 1930s; 1940s
- See also: Other events of 1920; Timeline of Swedish history

Events from the year 1920 in Sweden

== Incumbents ==
- Monarch – Gustaf V
- Prime Minister – Nils Edén, Hjalmar Branting, Gerhard Louis De Geer

== Events ==
- Sweden joins the League of Nations.
- The local social democratic women's clubs of Sweden is organised in the Social Democratic Women in Sweden.
- Legal majority for married women and equal marriage rights.
- 1 January - The Swedish Grace architecture style emerges.
- 14 August - Sweden wins 64 Olympic medals at the 1920 Summer Olympics in Antwerp, including nineteen gold medals.
- 4 September - The 1920 Swedish general election is held.
- 31 December - The Silver Age of Swedish National Romanticism comes to an end.

== Births ==
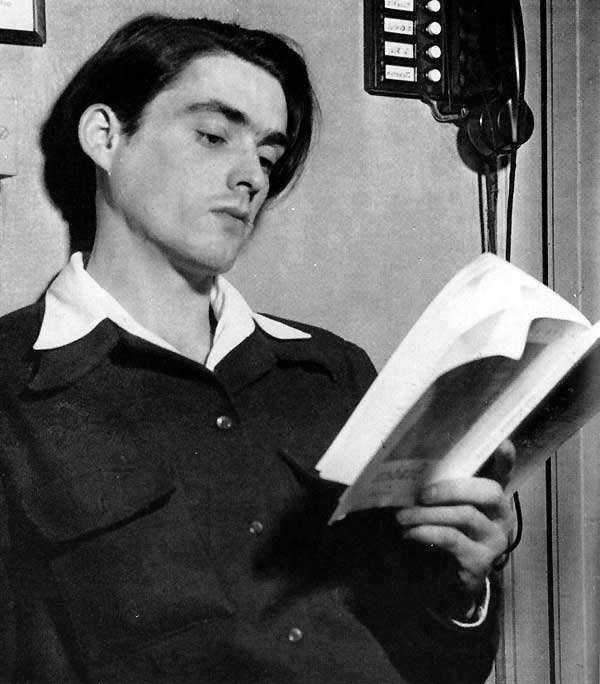
Bengt Anderberg.

● 8 February – Bengt Ekerot, actor (died 26 November 1971).

● 28 February – Alf kjellin, actor and director (died 5 April 1988).

● 8 March – Eva Dahlbeck, actress (died 8 February 2008).

● 2 April – Jan molander, actor and director (died 30 June 2009).

- 17 April – Bengt Anderberg, writer.
- 31 October – Gunnar Gren, footballer (died 1991).
- 29 December – Viveca Lindfors, actress (died 25 October 1995).

== Deaths ==
- 7 April – Hildegard Björck, scholar, first woman in Sweden to gain a degree (born 1847)
- 10 April - Amanda Kerfstedt, writer (born 1835)
- 21 June - Nanna Hoffman factory owner (born 1846)
- 10 August - Clara Lachmann, Danish-Swedish patron of the arts (born 1864)
- 20 November – Ida Göthilda Nilsson, sculptor (born 1840)
- 27 October - Agda Montelius, philanthropist and women's rights activist (born 1850)
- Anna Rönström, educator and mathematician (born 1847)
- Amanda Rylander, actress (born 1834)
