= Wilhelm Tham =

Swedish author, historian and geographer

Carl Wilhelm August Tham (22 July 1812 – 12 July 1873) was a Swedish writer, historian and geographer.

Carl Wilhelm August Tham was born in Forsvik, Sweden. He was the son of Vollrath Tham and Ulrika Beata Vult von Steijern.

He studied at Uppsala University and then worked as a teacher in Strängnäs. In 1850, Tham taught mathematics and physical geography at the Royal Swedish Academy of War Sciences.

== Works ==
- Vaticinorum Jesaiae caput V / Suethice versum, 1833
- Franska revolutionens historia i sammandrag efter A. Thiers, såsom inledning till konsulatets och kejsardömets historia, 1845
- Bidrag till svenska riksdagarnes och regeringsformens historia från midten af sjuttonde århundradet, 1845-1848
- Riksdagarne 1660 i Göteborg och Stockholm, 1845
- Beskrifning öfver Örebro län, 1849
- Beskrifning öfver Westerås län, 1849
- Beskrifning öfver Upsala län, 1850
- Beskrifning öfver Stockholms län, 1850
- Beskrifning öfver Nyköpings län, 1852
- Beskrifning öfver Linköpings län, 1854-1855
- Bidrag till Svenska Riksdagarnes Historia 1626-1629, 1855
- medförfattare till Nils Wilhelm Almroth, De europeiska myntsorterna, jemte en del amerikanska och asiatiska. Afbildning och beskrifning af alla nu curserande guld- och silfvermynt med uppgift på deras vigt, deras halt samt deras penninge- och metallvärde, 1856
- Konung Gustaf III och rikets ständer vid 1789 års riksdag, 1866
- Grunddrag till svensk och allmän statskunskap, 1868
- Grunddrag till allmän historia från 1492, 1871
