= Victor Hartman =

Swedish actor (1839–1898)

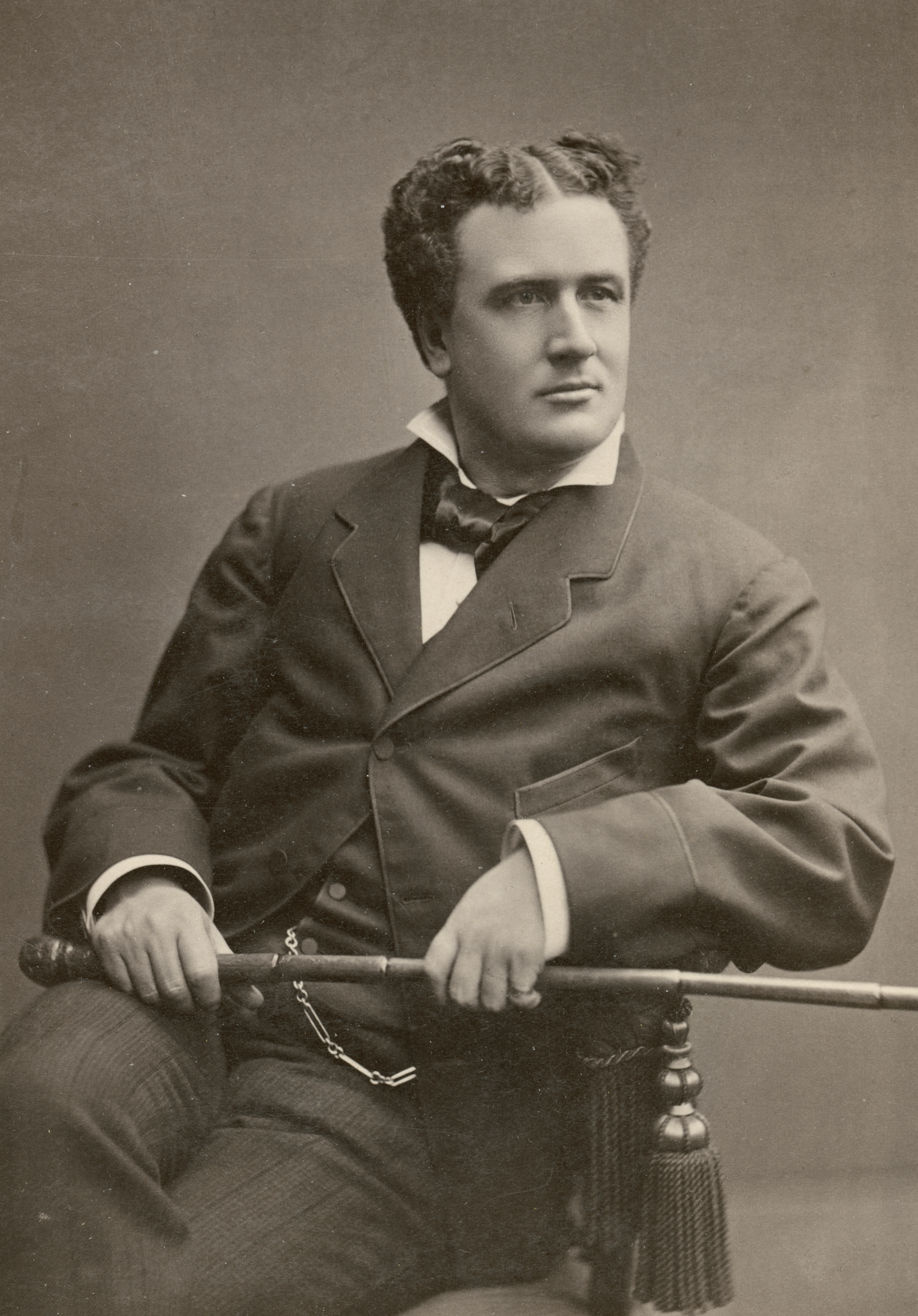
- Victor Hartman en 1877.
- Born: 30 December 1839
- Died: 15 June 1898 (aged 58)
- Occupation: Stage actor
- Spouse(s): Ellen Hartman
- Relatives: Elisabeth Sjöström

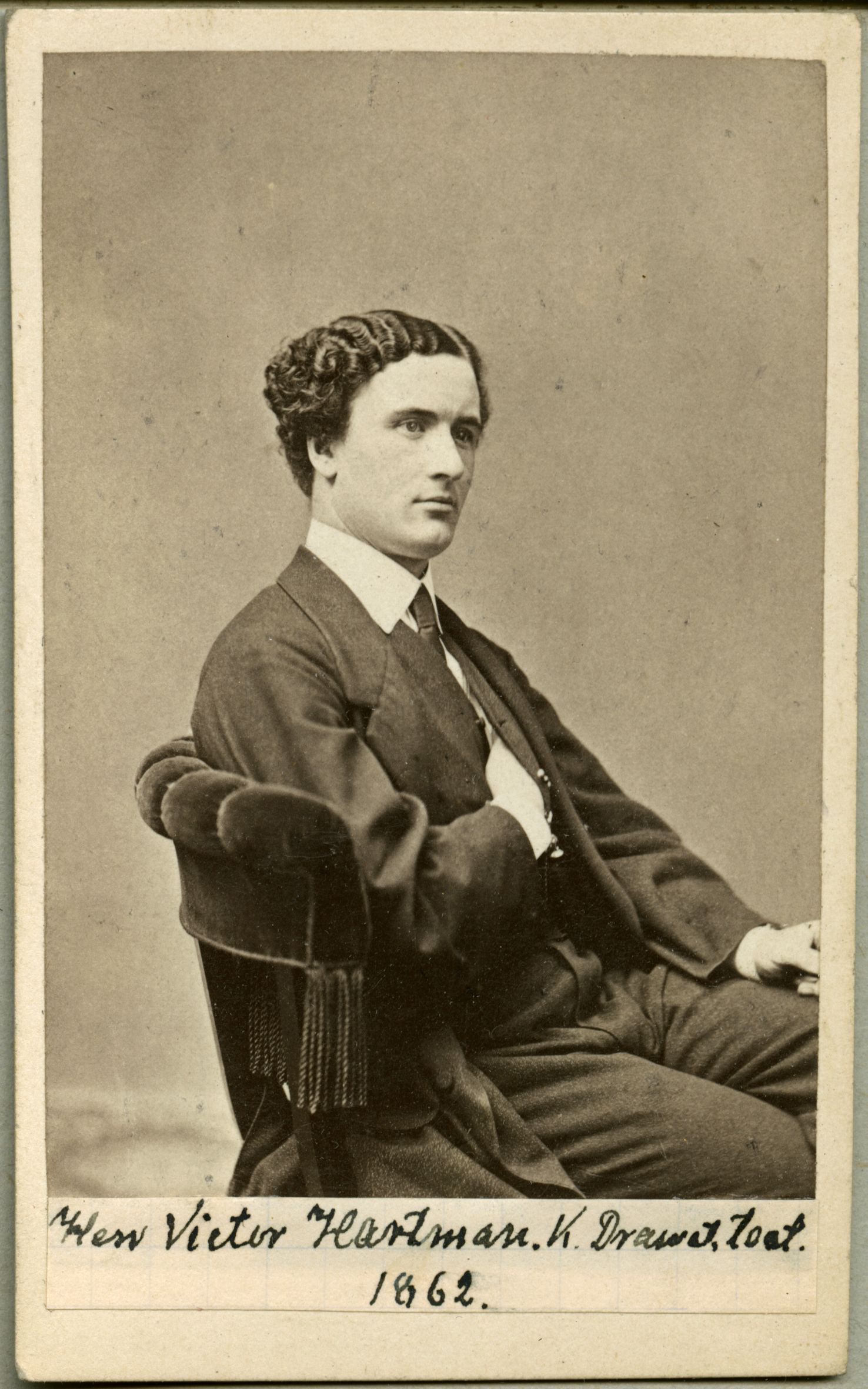
Victor Hartman

Victor Laurentius Hartman (30 December 1839 – 15 June 1898) was a Swedish actor.

Hartman studied at Kungliga Teaterns Balett (The Ballet Company of the Royal Theatre) and at Mindre teatern from 1854 to 1856, followed by studies at Kungliga Teaterns Dramatiska Scen (The Dramatic Stage of the Royal Theatre) between 1856 and 1861. At the latter he was taught by actors Johan Jolin and Carl Gustaf Sundberg. In 1861 he was employed at the Royal Dramatic Theatre and in 1866 became a lead actor at the Royal Dramatic Theatre. He was for a long time the Royal Dramatic Theatre's most used actor, and was known for his lighthearted comedy acts and more serious works.

Among the first of Hartman's roles that received attention was the role of Paddy in the play Richard Sheridan and as Madinier in Fruarna Montambèche. He is best known for the roles he played in the 1870s and early 1880s, when he played the character Carlo van der Not in Victorien Sardou's Allt för fosterlandet. He also played Henri in De onyttiga, and during that period of his career also acted in the plays Don Cesar de Bazano, Volontären, Ferréol, Ambrosius, and as Gerald in Rolands dotter, de Nanjac in Falska juveler and Achille in the play Christiane.

Hartman was awarded the medal Litteris et Artibus in 1882. At the end of March 1885, several bouts of lung disease began preventing him from performing until that October. His health never fully recovered. He settled for smaller parts and could no longer cope with the workload of playing every night by the time of his last role as Junot in Madame Sans-Gêne.

== Personal life ==
Between 1881 and 1892, Hartman was married to actress Ellen Hedlund. He died on 18 June 1898, a few days after a brain hemorrhage.
