= Juvenals =

The Juvenals (Swedish: Juvenalerna) was a student society of Uppsala, in Sweden.
