= 1770 in Sweden =

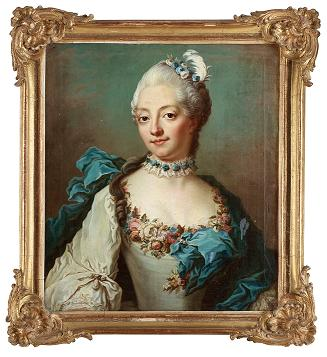
Petronella Hultman

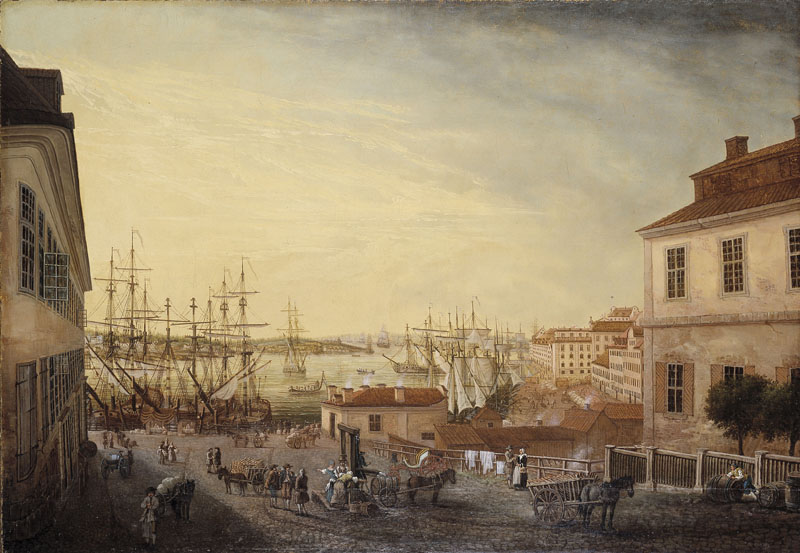
Sevenbom, Brunnsbacken

Events from the year 1770 in Sweden

== Incumbents ==
- Monarch – Adolf Frederick

== Events ==
- August - The Aurora Society is created in the Swedish province of Finland.
- 8 November – Crown Prince Gustav and his youngest brother travel to Paris.

== Births ==
- 3 March - Johan Wilhelm Palmstruch, naturalist (died 1811)
- 27 March - Anna Lisa Jermen, entrepreneur (died 1799)
- 27 March - Eleonora Charlotta d'Albedyhll, poet and salonnière (died 1835)
- 9 October - Eleonora Säfström, actress (died 1857)
- 23 October - Lisette Stenberg, actress and pianist (died 1847)
- Carl Dahlén, ballet dancer (died 1851)

== Deaths ==
- 24 June - Martin van Meytens, painter (born 1695)
- 21 July – Charlotta Frölich, writer, historian and agronomist (born 1698)
