= Maria Ribbing =

Swedish schoolteacher and philanthropist

Augusta Maria Aurora Ribbing née de Vylder (1842–1910) was a Swedish schoolteacher and philanthropist. In addition to her contributions to teaching, she provided funding for social support, including Sweden's first old peoples home which opened in 1915.

== Biography ==
Born in Stockholm on 8 June 1842, Ribbing was the daughter of the language teacher Louis De Vylder and his wife Maria Christina Ahlborg. When she was 17, she embarked on a teacher training course, the Lärokurs för fruntimmer in Stockholm. On graduating, she taught at the Normal School for girls until 1871 when she married the physician Seved Ribbing. After a year-long study trip around Europe, they settled in Simrishamn in southern Sweden but later moved to Lund. The couple welcomed people from all walks of life to their spacious home known as Spoletorp. Ribbing always made sure that there was more than enough food ready, even for children and the needy who came by.

Ribbing devoted much of her time to creating charitable institutions in Lund for those in need. By raising money through lotteries and donations, she was able to establish a home for the terminally ill in 1915. After her husband's death in 1921, it was known as the Ribbingska Hospital. She was active in several pedagogical and philanthropic associations, particularly those concerned with assisting the poor. She was even behind the creation of a Swedish church in Copenhagen as a means of helping Swedes in Denmark.

Maria Ribbing became an extremely popular figure in Lund and the surroundings. Following her death on 14 October 1910, hundreds attended her funeral. Three of her four children survived her.
