= Amanda Forsberg =

Swedish ballerina

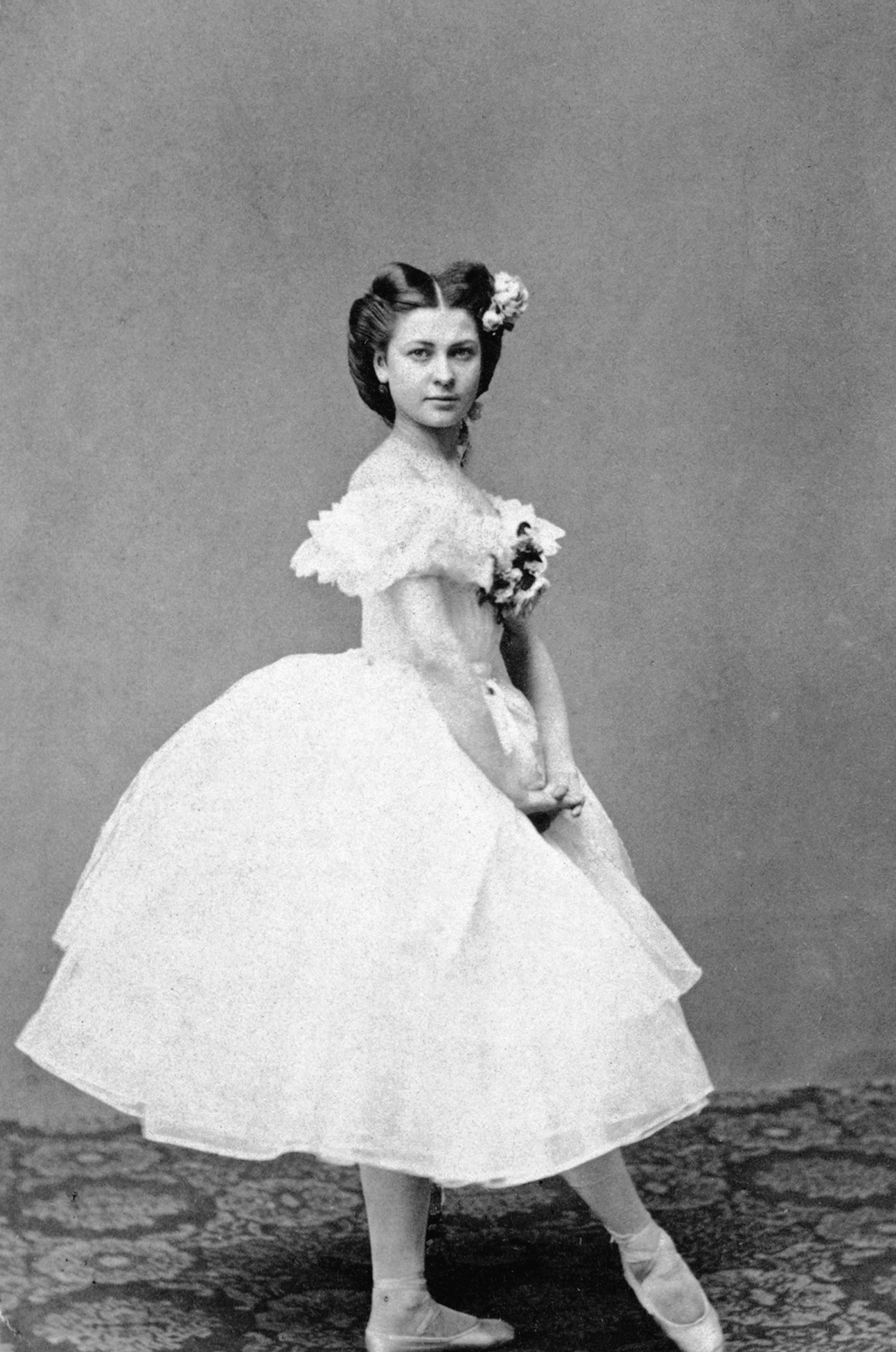
Amanda Forsberg

Amanda Nestoria Forsberg (born 26 February 1846) was a Swedish ballerina.

Forsberg was born in Stockholm. She was a student at the Royal Swedish Ballet in 1863 and a premier dancer in 1864–69; she was a premier dancer at the Staatsoper Unter den Linden in Berlin in 1870–1882.

Her dance was, according to contemporary critics, characterized by an "unusual airy" finesse and an "intoxicating virginal modesty", and she was also recommended for her mimicry.
