= Catharina Ulrika Hjort af Ornäs =

Swedish noblewoman and murder victim

Catharina Ulrika Hjort af Ornäs (6 January 1767 – 11 January 1837) was a Swedish noblewoman and the victim of a murder case which was famous in contemporary Sweden. She died after having been subjected to abuse by her spouse and confined in a single room in her home for 33 years, after having been afflicted by a possible postpartum depression, and eventually succumbed to starvation and exhaustion.

== Life ==
Catharina Ulrika Hjort af Ornäs was born to the nobleman Hans Gustaf Hjort af Ornäs (1725–1791) and Christina Brandberg (1722–1805), and the youngest of seven siblings, four of whom survived to adulthood; Jakob Fredrik (1755–1806), Hans Gustaf (1757–1828), Helena Christina (1759–1833) and Carl Anders (1765–1809). She married on 7 January 1803 to the nobleman major (later colonel lieutenant) Adrian Hertzenhielm (1754–1838), with whom she settled at his estate Ramsnäsholm. She was wealthy and brought a fortune with her dowry which, in accordance with the contemporary law of the minority of married women, was automatically transferred to her husband after her marriage.

=== Abuse ===
In 1804, she gave birth to her only child: her daughter Christina Ulrika (1804–1864). After the birth of her child, she seems to have been afflicted by some sort of mental illness, which has been suggested to be a postpartum depression. As a response, her husband sent their daughter to be brought up by foster parents in Stockholm, and had her confined in a single room in the manor house.

Catharina Ulrika lived locked up in the room for the rest of her life. Her husband isolated her from the outside world and forbade her from seeing anyone, including her daughter (who married Major Teodor Vilhelm Starenflycht and left her father's guardianship in 1824). No fire was lit to warm her room during winter, and she was not provided any care or sufficient clothing, and was eventually forced to live naked, when her clothes were not replaced. Insufficient food was brought to her which apparently kept her in a half-starved state. When she lost her teeth, she was unable to eat much of the food brought to her, and was often forced to live merely on swallowing flour. Eventually, she reportedly became so weakened, that she was unable to fight off the rats from chewing at her feet.

Her husband Adrian Hertzenhielm was described as infamously stingy: he was, for example, known to dress in the same fur and boots every day except on special occasions. A great part of his own fortune consisted of the former fortune of his wife, which became his when he married her. The fact that he kept his wife confined to her room because of mental illness was known locally, but not mentioned or talked about openly, nor did anyone interfere, including her siblings, adult daughter, and the surrounding community. In contemporary law, a married woman was legally a minor under the guardianship of her husband, and furthermore, her husband had her confined because of her mental health, which was not uncommon in an age were the family of the mentally ill hid them at home if they did not have them placed in a mental asylum.

=== Death ===
Catharina Ulrika finally died on 11 January 1837. Reportedly, her widower left her corpse lying in the room for a long time after her death, and by the time he decided to have it moved, it was partially eaten by rats. Unwilling to pay for a funeral despite his wealth, Hertzenhielm attempted to have her corpse transported away in secrecy at night. This was however discovered, which exposed the whole affair in public.

Adrian Hertzenhielm was arrested and charged with the abuse and murder of his wife. Reportedly, he defended himself "with much boldness" during the interrogations. The case was given much attention in the contemporary Swedish press and became a cause célèbre of the time: "The horror, which had been exposed, was reported in all the papers of the kingdom and was for a long period the sole topic of conversation within all classes of society". Adrian Hertzenhielm, however, being 83 years old at the time of his arrest, died of natural causes before he was scheduled to be tried, and was therefore never sentenced.

== Legacy ==
The case was given attention in the press, magazines and songs for decades after 1837. In 1889, a serial novel titled Major Hertzenhjelm eller Det hemska dådet på Ramsnäsholm (Major Hertzenhjelm or, The terrifying deed at Ramsnäsholm) was published by Tekla.

The manor house Ramsnäsholm was a target for sensationalist pilgrimages until it was torn down in 1968. In 2013, an Ornäs Birch was planted where Ramsnäsholm once was, in memory of Catharina Ulrika Hjort af Ornäs, with a warning always to speak out in protest against a wrongdoing, rather than just stand by and see it committed.

== See also ==
- List of long-term false imprisonment cases

== Bibliography ==
- Catharina Ulrika Hjort af Ornäs i Wilhelmina Stålberg, Anteckningar om svenska qvinnor (1864)
- Tragiskt livsöde hedras
- Gustafsson, Marie & Bustad, Andreas, Historien om Catharina Ulrica Hiort af Ornäs: "det hemska dådet på Ramsnäsholm", Lilla Ornäs förlag, Borlänge, 2012
- Gustaf Elgenstierna, Den introducerade svenska adelns ättartavlor. 1925–36.
