= 1925 in Sweden =

- Decades: 1900s; 1910s; 1920s; 1930s; 1940s
- See also: Other events of 1925; Timeline of Swedish history

Events from the year 1925 in Sweden

== Incumbents ==
- Monarch – Gustaf V
- Prime Minister – Hjalmar Branting, Rickard Sandler

== Events ==
- 1 January – First day of radio broadcasting in Sweden: AB Radiotjänst (forerunner of Sveriges Radio) broadcasts its first programme. Gaston Borch conducts the Skandia Cinema Orchestra in the country's first broadcast of orchestral music.
- 25 January – Hjalmar Branting resigns as Prime Minister because of ill health and is replaced by the minister of trade, Rickard Sandler.
- 5 April – The Swedish Bandy Association is founded in Stockholm out of the Swedish Football Association's former bandy section.

== Births ==
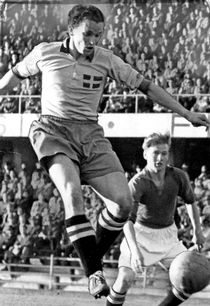
Hasse Jeppson.

- 4 February – Arne Åhman, triple jumper, Olympic champion in 1948.
- 27 April – Folke Eriksson, water polo player (died 2008).
- 2 May – Inga Gill, film actress (died 2000)
- 10 May – Hasse Jeppson, footballer
- 24 May – Mai Zetterling, film actress and director (died 1994)
- 11 July – Nicolai Gedda, operatic tenor (died 2017)
- 14 September – Ove Rainer, politician (died 1987)
- 4 November – Folke Sundquist, actor (died 2009)
- 27 November – Kurt Lundquist, runner (died 2011).

== Deaths ==
- 14 February – Signe Hebbe, opera singer (born 1837)
- 24 February – Hjalmar Branting, 19th Prime Minister of Sweden, recipient of the Nobel Peace Prize (born 1860)
- 8 March – Arvid Knöppel, sport shooter (born 1867).
- 2 June – Emilia Broomé, politician (born 1866)
- 3 October – Frigga Carlberg, women's rights activist (born 1851)
