= Clementine Swartz =

Swedish stage actress

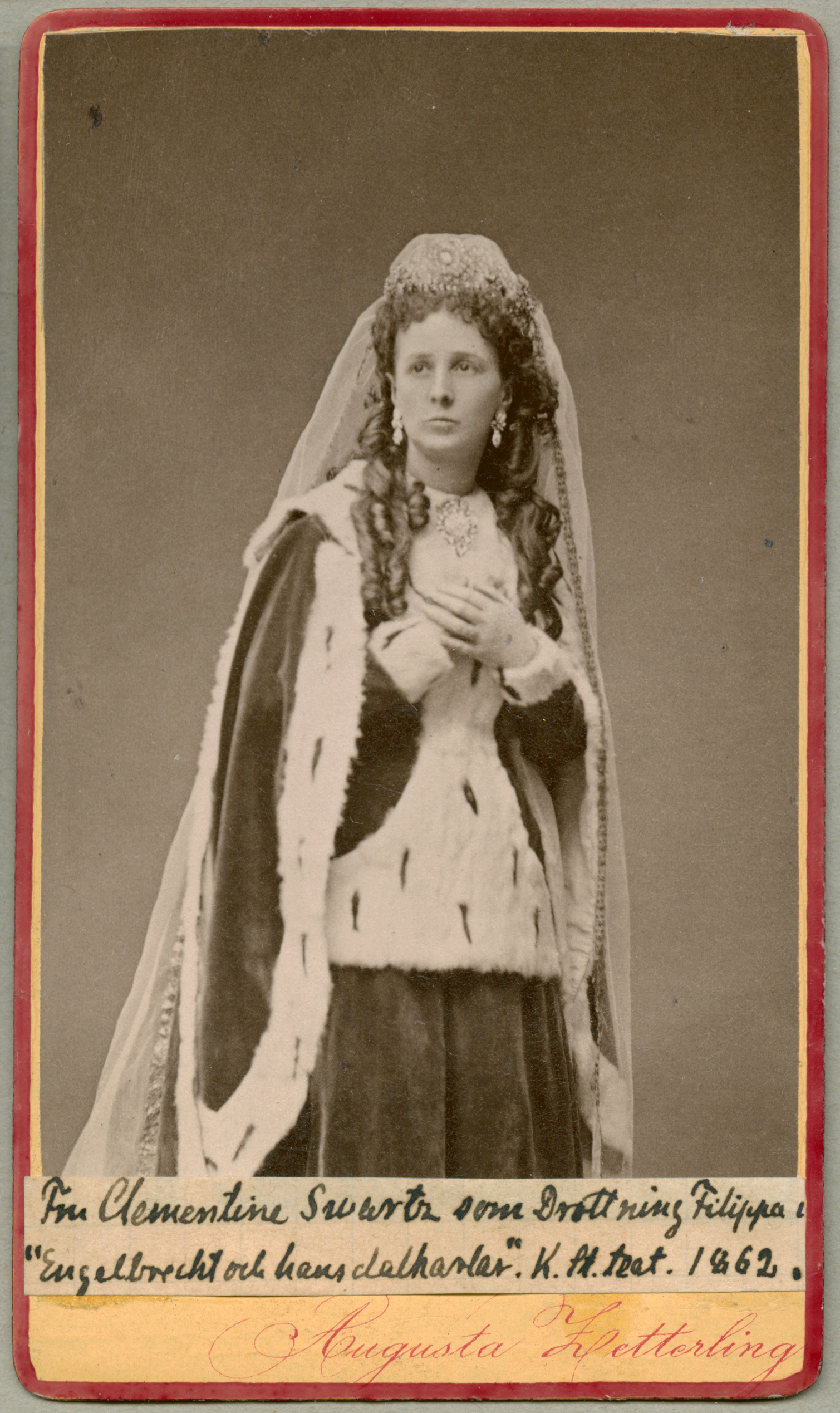
Clementine Swartz

Clementine Swartz, née Fehrnström (15 February 1835, in Uleåborg – 7 December 1923, in Stockholm), was a Swedish stage actress. She belonged to the elite actors of the Royal Dramatic Theatre in 1853-1888.

She was the daughter of the actor Robert Fehrnström and Augusta Fredrika Grönlund, and married the actor Edvard Swartz in 1854.

Clementine Swartz was engaged in the theater company of Oscar Andersson in 1850-53, at Humlegårdsteatern in Stockholm in 1853 and, after having made such a successful debut there, she was engaged at the Royal Dramatic Theatre the same year and remained there until she retired from the stage in 1888 (she was made a premier actress in 1868).

She was described as dignified, fragile and with a high degree of professionalism, and was given best critic for roles within mild and gracious characters: "Her acting was always dominated by the dutiful care by which she solved the tasks she was given. She was less able to give expression to strong passions then to mild, gracious characters", and it was said of her that she attracted attention with "her unusually fragile features, the thin, tall figure as well as an inborn or at least early on trained ability to act with dignity and easy grace on stage".

She was given the Litteris et Artibus by King Oscar II.
