= Gurli Åberg =

Swedish actress (1843–1922)

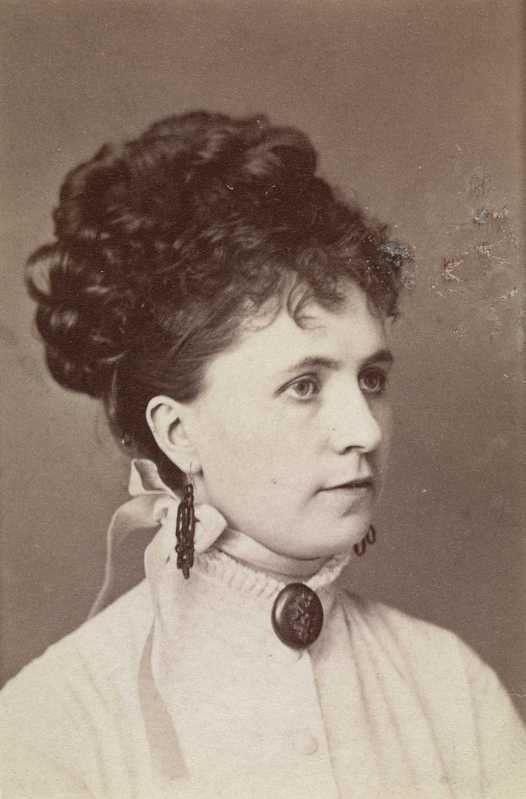
Gurli Carolina Åberg

Gurli Johanna Carolina Åberg (14 September 1843, Stockholm - 2 July 1922, Stockholm), was a Swedish stage actress.

She was the half sister of Zelma Hedin. She was a student of the Royal Dramatic Training Academy 1858–60, made her debut at the Royal Dramatic Theatre in 1860 and was contracted as a premier actress there in 1862-68 and 1871–83, and at the Swedish Theatre in 1884–87. She was a student of Signe Hebbe. In 1870, she made a study trip to Paris, but was forced to interrupt in at the outbreak of the Franco-Prussian War. She made tours to Oslo in 1871, 1872 and 1883.

Gurli Åberg was described as one of the most popular actors in Sweden of the 1870s and 1880s. She was a serious student in acting, noted for her professionalism, was said to be particularly talented within comedy, and likened to Augustine Brohan. Her performances where referred to as "Gullu Evenings" and she is noted to have been was given jewels by the audience. She was also noted for her beauty, and because of this she was often used as an ornament onstage, which reportedly made her frustrated and contributed to her resignation from the royal stage in 1883.

She married the engineer Carl Gustaf Fredrik Ulff in 1883.
