= Olga Sandberg =

Swedish ballerina

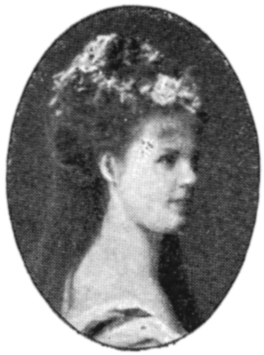
Olga Sandberg

Olga Götilda Katarina Sandberg (21 December 1844 – September 1926), was a Swedish ballerina.

Sandberg was born in Stockholm. She was a student at the Royal Swedish Ballet in 1854 and second dancer in 1865–1870. She was a student of Gasperini. She performed at Victoria-Theater in Berlin, in Rostock and Lemberg. She was active at the Wiener Staatsoper in Vienna in 1873–1878.

Her best known parts were La magnolia, Polka coquette, Valse, Jalousie de metier, Polka mazurka and the abbess in Robert.
