= 1926 in Sweden =

- Decades: 1900s; 1910s; 1920s; 1930s; 1940s
- See also: Other events of 1926; Timeline of Swedish history

Events from the year 1926 in Sweden

== Incumbents ==
- Monarch – Gustaf V
- Prime Minister – Rickard Sandler, Carl Gustaf Ekman

== Events ==
- 6–14 February – The Nordic Games take place in Stockholm.

== Births ==
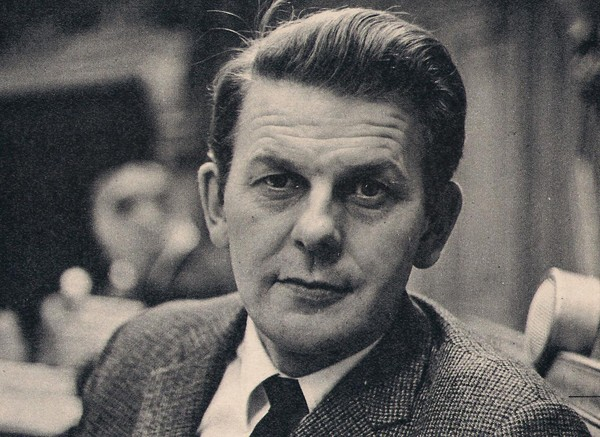
Thorbjörn Fälldin, prime minister 1976-78 and 1979-82.

- 24 April – Thorbjörn Fälldin, politician
- 21 May – Gustaf Lindh, modern pentathlete
- 5 June – Kerstin Gellerman, politician

=== Exact date missing ===
- Lars Ardelius, psychologist and novelist.
- Hans Granlid, novelist and literary historian (died 1999).
- Rita Tornborg, novelist and short story writer.

== Deaths ==
- 14 May – Adolf Bergman, tug-of-war competitor (born 1879).
- 23 May – Sigrid Elmblad, writer and translator (born 1860)
- 26 July – Olle Lanner, gymnast (born 1884).
- Wilhelmina Skogh
- Ellen Key
- Olga Sandberg
