= 1837 in Sweden =

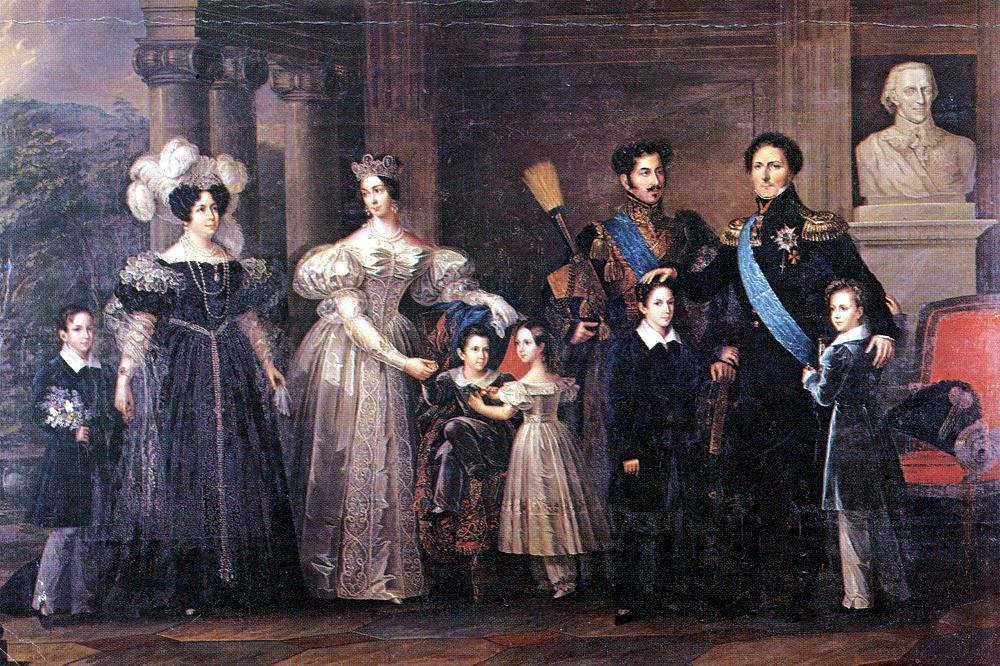
The royal family

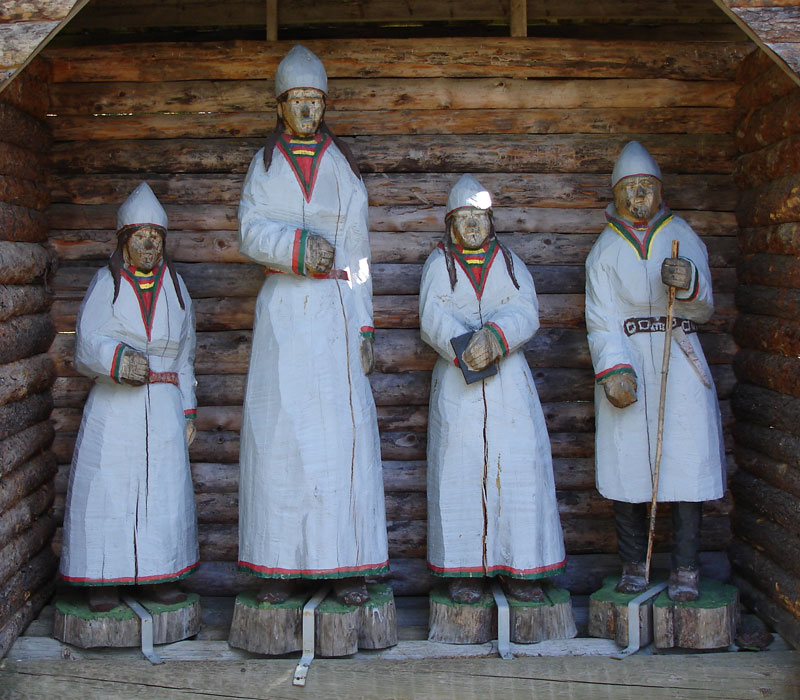
Monument over Stor-Stina at Brännäs in Malå.

Events from the year 1837 in Sweden

== Incumbents ==
- Monarch – Charles XIV John

== Events ==
- January - The cause célèbre murder of Catharina Ulrika Hjort af Ornäs shocked the country.
- - Kloka Anna i Vallåkra began her career as a religious visionary.
- - The first issue of the Nya Wermlands-Tidningen
- - Albert Bonniers förlag is founded.
- - Stor-Stina starts her exhibition tours.
- - Grannarne by Fredrika Bremer

== Births ==
- 19 May – Pontus Wikner, lecturer in philosophy and professor of aesthetics (died 1888)
- 30 July – Signe Hebbe, opera singer (died 1925)
- Johanna Hedén, midwife (died 1912)
- Maria Andersson (businesswoman) (died 1922)

== Deaths ==
- 3 January - Christina Rahm, opera singer and actress (born 1760)
- 11 January - Catharina Ulrika Hjort af Ornäs murder victim (born 1767)
- 7 February - Gustav IV Adolf of Sweden, deposed monarch (born 1778)
- 20 May – Johan Afzelius, chemist (born 1753)
- 24 May – Gustaf Lagerbielke, politician (born 1817)
- 21 August - Sophia Rosenhane, benefactor (born 1757)
- - Inga Åberg, opera singer and stage actress (born 1773)
