= Wilhelmina Stålberg =

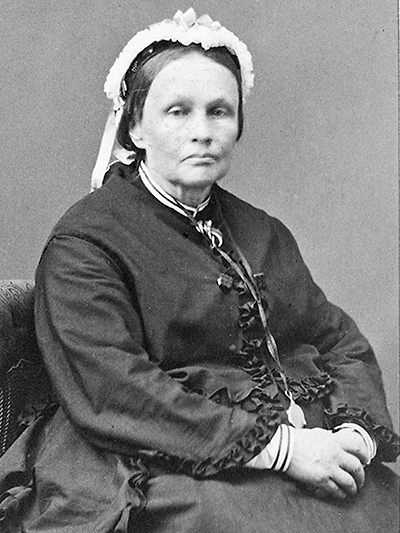
Wilhelmina Stalberg

Carolina Wilhelmina Stålberg (26 November 1803, Stockholm – 23 July 1872, Mariefred) was a Swedish writer, poet, translator, and lyricist. She worked under the pseudonym "Wilhelmina".

== Selected works ==
- Min lyras första toner (1826)
- Min ungdoms idealer (1826)
- Poetiska försök (1931)
- Ingrid Örnefot (1832)
- Axel Nilsson Tott (1832)
- En vinter i Hernösand (1834)
- Den lyckliga omnibusfärden (1838)
- Emmas hjerta (1839)
- Eva Widebeck, eller Det går aldrig an (1840)
- Diodes och Lydia (1841)
- Lyriska toner (1843)
- Blomsterspråket, historiskt, mythologiskt och poetiskt tecknadt (1843)
- Försök till ett nordiskt mythologiskt lexikon (1844)
- Major Müllers döttrar (1845)
- De begge aristokraterna (1847)
- Catharina Månsdotter (1848)
- Drottning Filippa (1849)
- Om svenska prinsessor (1858)
- Christina, drottning af Sverige (1861)
- Bröderna Stålkrona (1863)

== Sources ==
- Krook, Axel (1872). Wilhelmina Ståhlberg (obituary). Svea Folk-kalender (1873): sid. 221–224. Libris 2105141 (in Swedish)
- Stålberg, Karolina Vilhelmina, Nordisk familjebok (2nd edition, 1918) (in Swedish)
