= 1850s =

Decade

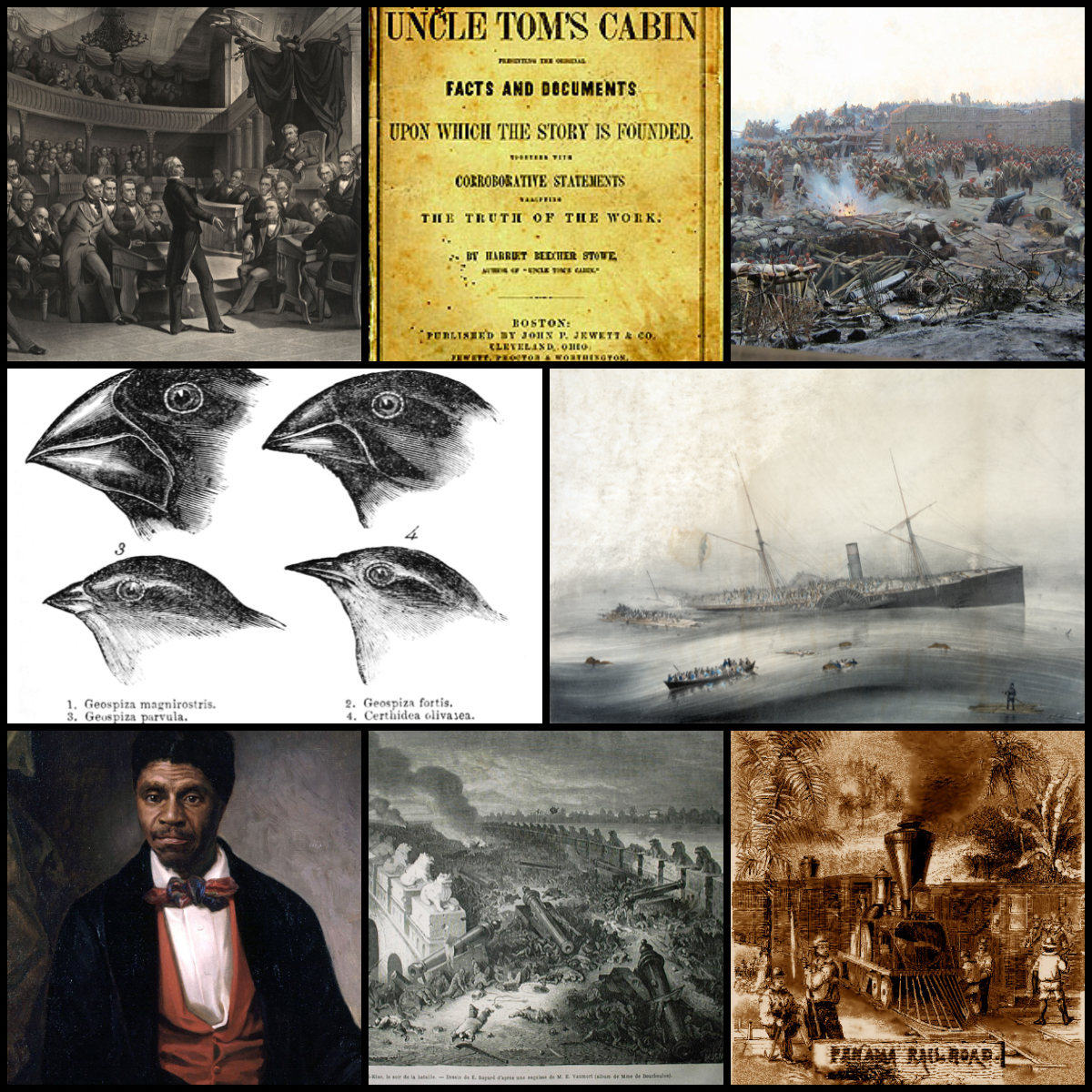
From left, clockwise: Henry Clay introduces the Compromise of 1850 the U.S. Senate; Harriet Beecher Stowe publishes Uncle Tom's Cabin; Russian forces fight against British, French and Ottoman forces in Sevastopol during the Crimean War; SS Arctic, an American steamship, sinks in the Atlantic Ocean after a collision with a French steamship, SS Vesta in 1854; The Panama Railroad opens in 1855 connecting the Pacific and Atlantic Oceans with a railroad in Central America; Anglo-French and Qing Empire forces engage each other in a four-year long campaign known as the Second Opium War starting in 1856; Dred Scott v. Sandford denies American citizenship as mandated under the U.S. Constitution to African Americans; Charles Darwin publishes On the Origin of Species in 1859, presenting the idea of natural selection.

The 1850s (pronounced "eighteen-fifties") was a decade of the Gregorian calendar that began on January 1, 1850, and ended on December 31, 1859.

It was a very turbulent decade, as wars such as the Crimean War, shifted and shook European politics, as well as the expansion of colonization towards the Far East, which also sparked conflicts like the Second Opium War. In the meantime, the United States saw its peak on mass migration to the American West, that particularly made the nation experience an economic boom, as well as a rapidly increasing population.

The last living person from this decade was Ada Roe, who died in 1970.

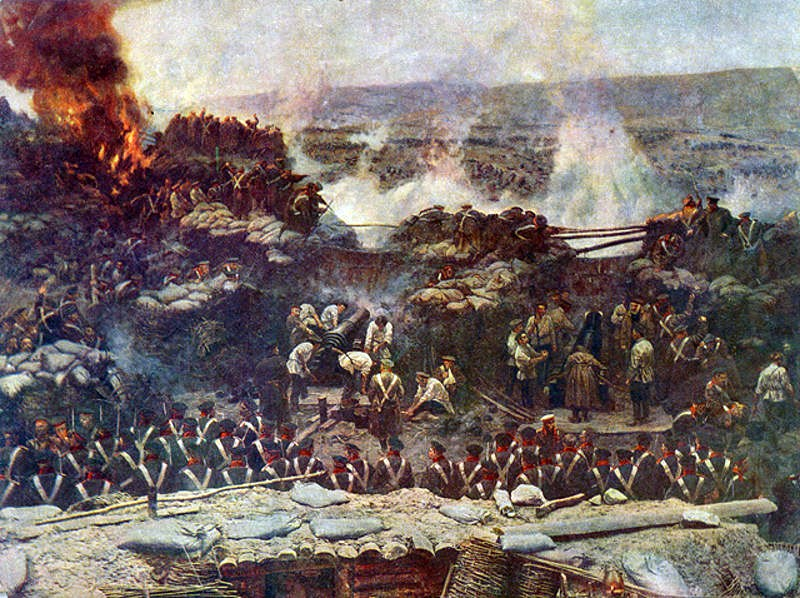
Crimean War

== Wars ==
- Crimean War (1853–56) fought between Imperial Russia and an alliance consisting of the United Kingdom of Great Britain and Ireland, the Second French Empire, the Kingdom of Sardinia and the Ottoman Empire. The majority of the conflict takes place around Crimea, on the northern coasts of the Black Sea.
- On 8 October 1856 the Second Opium War between several western powers and China begins with the Arrow Incident on the Pearl River.
- Second War of Italian Independence (1859), also known as Franco-Austrian War, or Austro-Sardinian War.
- Cayuse War — the Cayuse Five (five members of the Cayuse people) were executed for murder in 1850 following the Whitman massacre (an attack on a mission settlement near present-day Walla Walla, Washington)

== Internal conflicts ==
- The revolt in Alexandria by Alexandrian locals led by Sherekoh, governor of Alexandria against Abbas I of Egypt.
- The Indian Rebellion of 1857, a revolt against British colonial rule in India.
- Bleeding Kansas (1854–59): battles erupt in Kansas Territory between proslavery and "Free-State" settlers, directly precipitating the American Civil War.
- Reform War (1857–1861) in Mexico
- Taiping Rebellion (1850–1864) in southeastern China.
- Nian Rebellion (1853–1868) in northern China.
- Miao Rebellion (1854–1873) in Guizhou province, China.
- Red Turban Rebellion (1854–1856) in Guangdong province, China.
- Punti–Hakka Clan Wars (1855–1867) in Guangdong province, China.
- Panthay Rebellion (1856–73) in Yunnan province, China.

== Prominent political events ==
- Moldavia and Wallachia are unified and form Romania.
- Gideon T. Stewart attempts to create a Prohibition Party.
- Dissolution of the Mughal Empire by the British.
- Establishment of the South African Republic (Zuid-Afrikaansche Republiek) and the Orange Free State, granting independence to the Voortrekkers by the British.

== Assassinations and attempts ==
Prominent assassinations, targeted killings, and assassination attempts include:

- Assassination of Abbas I of Egypt by 4 of his slaves (1854)
- Eight were killed and 142 wounded in Paris in a failed assassination attempt on Napoleon III, Emperor of the French (1858).

== Science and technology ==
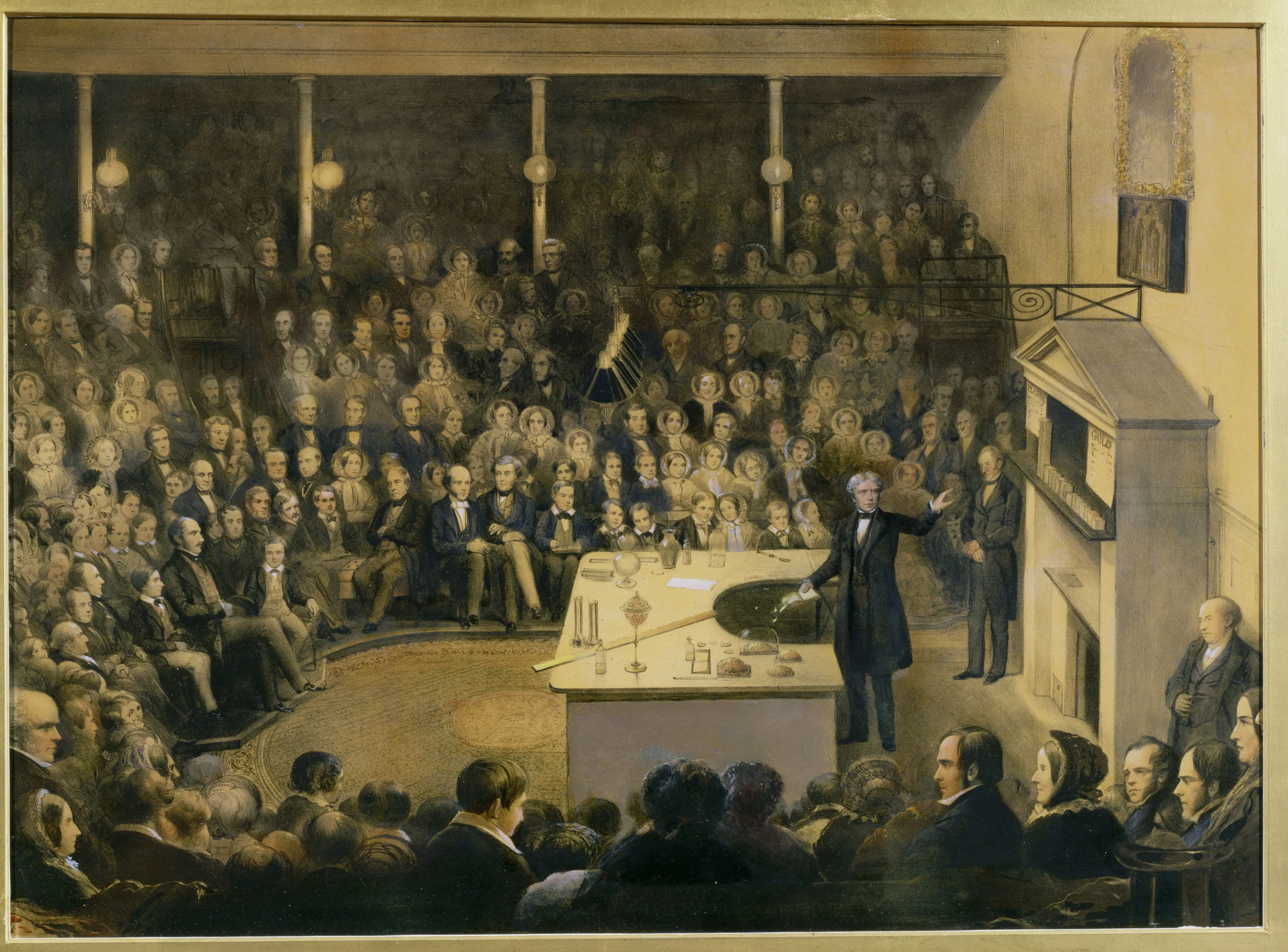
Michael Faraday delivering a Christmas Lecture at the Royal Institution in London, c. 1855

- 1851 – the Great Exhibition is held at the Crystal Palace, London, considered to be the first world's fair.
- 1851 – the first public exhibition of a Foucault pendulum, at the Meridian of the Paris Observatory, demonstrating the Earth's rotation.
- 1851 – German physiologist Hermann von Helmholtz invents the Keratometer, a diagnostic instrument for measuring the curvature of the anterior surface of the cornea and assessing the extent and axis of astigmatism
- 1856 – discovery of Neanderthal fossils in Neanderthal, Germany.
- 1856 – Eunice Newton Foote is the first scientist to make the connection between the amount of carbon dioxide in our atmosphere and climate change
- 1858 – Donati's Comet, the first comet to be photographed, is discovered by Giovanni Battista Donati
- 1858 – first publication of Gray's Anatomy.
- 24 November 1859 – Charles Darwin publishes The Origin of Species, putting forward the theory of evolution by natural selection
- 1859 – Florence Nightingale publishes Notes on Nursing: What it is and What it is Not
- 1859 – Marian Albertovich Kowalski publishes the first usable method to deduce the rotation of the Milky Way
- 1859 – Pollen is identified as the cause of allergic rhinitis by Charles Harrison Blackley.
- 1859 – French mathematician Nicolas Auguste Tissot first proposes Tissot's indicatrix in cartography.
- 1859 – Étienne Lenoir produces the first single-cylinder two-stroke Lenoir cycle gas engine with an electric ignition system.
- Epidemiology begins when John Snow traces the source of an outbreak of cholera in London to a contaminated water pump.
- Solar flares discovered by Richard Christopher Carrington.

== Economics ==
- Distinction between coats and jackets begins to blur
- Production of steel revolutionized by invention of the Bessemer process
- Benjamin Silliman fractionates petroleum by distillation for the first time
- First transatlantic telegraph cable laid
- First safety elevator installed by Elisha Otis
- Railroads begin to supplant canals in the United States as a primary means of transporting goods.
- First commercially successful sewing machine made by Isaac Singer

== Environment ==
- Ukrainian settlers take Carniolan honey bees to what is now Primorsky Krai

== Society ==
- The word girlfriend first appears in writing in 1855.
- The word boyfriend first appears in writing in 1856.

== Popular culture ==
=== Literature ===
- Charles Dickens publishes Bleak House, Hard Times, Little Dorrit and A Tale of Two Cities
- Nathaniel Hawthorne publishes The Scarlet Letter in 1850
- Herman Melville publishes Moby-Dick; or, The Whale in 1851
- Harriet Beecher Stowe publishes Uncle Tom's Cabin in 1852. The novel had a profound effect on attitudes toward African Americans and slavery in the U.S., and is said to have "helped lay the groundwork for the American Civil War".
- Herman Melville publishes Bartleby, the Scrivener in 1853
- Charlotte Brontë publishes Villette in 1853
- Elizabeth Gaskell publishes North and South in 1854
- Christina Rossetti writes Goblin Market in 1859
