= 1790 in Sweden =

- Years in Sweden: 1787 1788 1789 1790 1791 1792 1793
- Centuries: 17th century · 18th century · 19th century
- Decades: 1760s 1770s 1780s 1790s 1800s 1810s 1820s
- Years: 1787 1788 1789 1790 1791 1792 1793

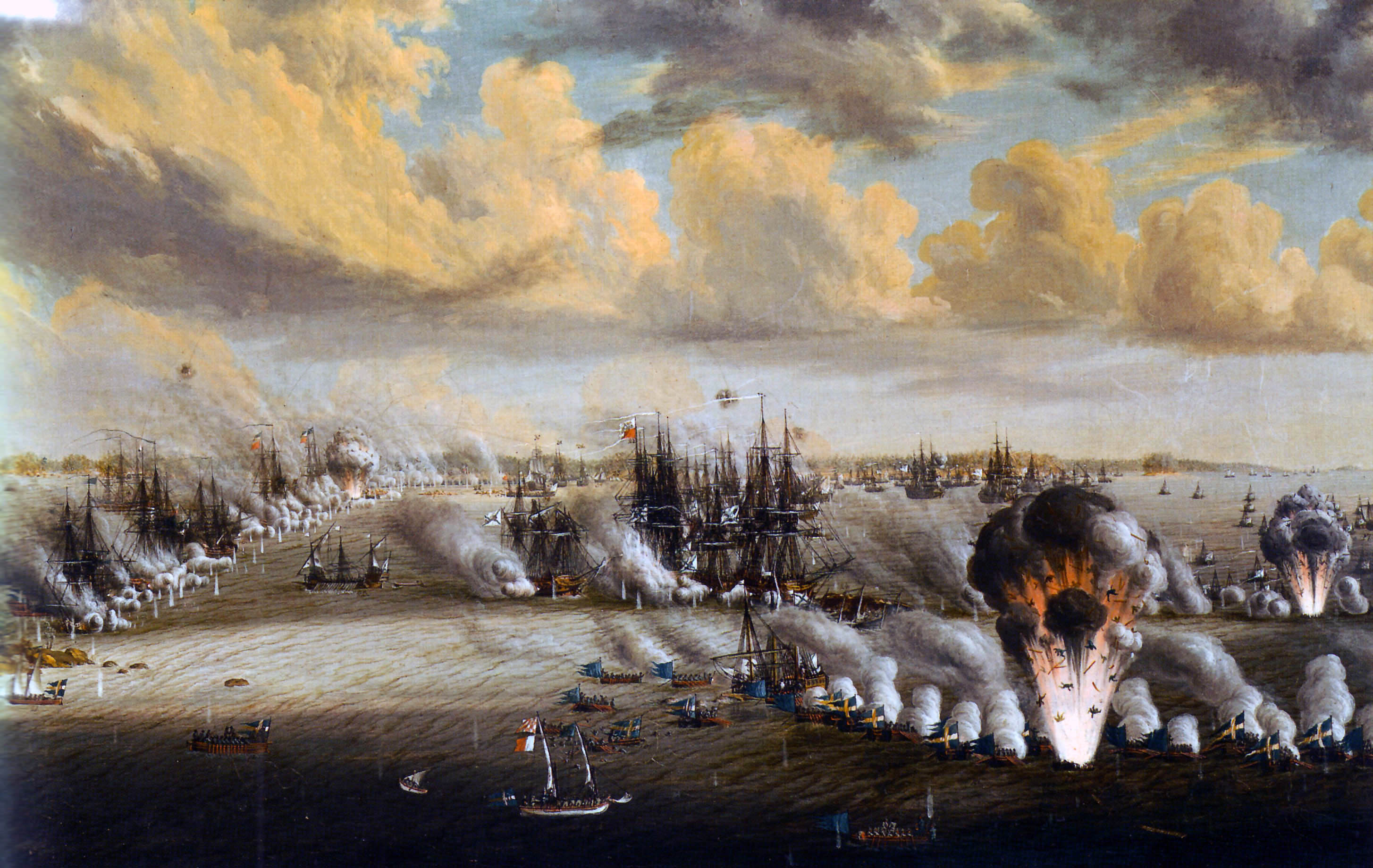
The Battle of Svensksund

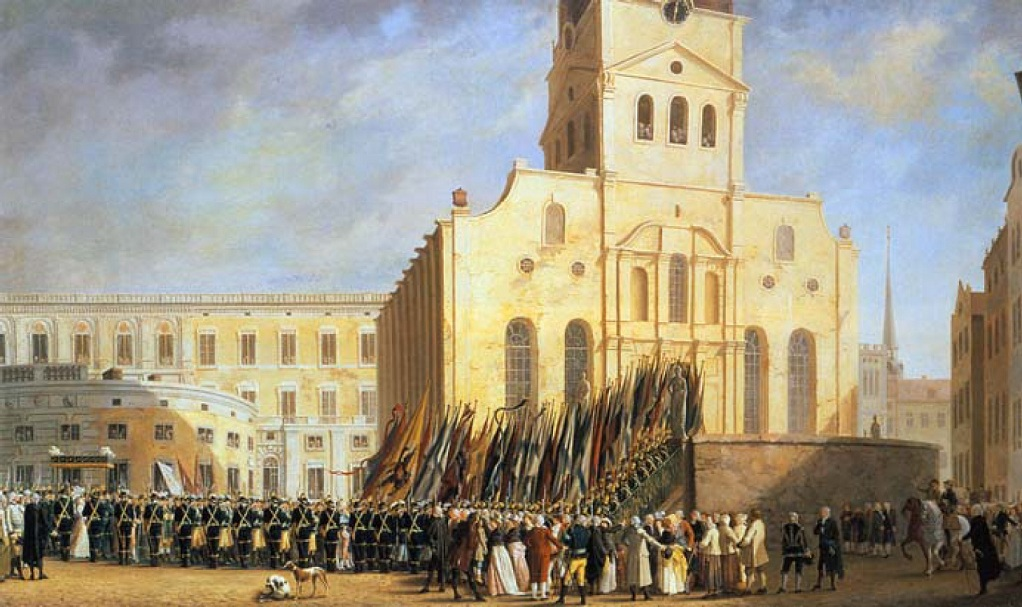
Trophies from the battle of Svensksund are carried in to the Storkyrkan. Painting by Pehr Hilleström

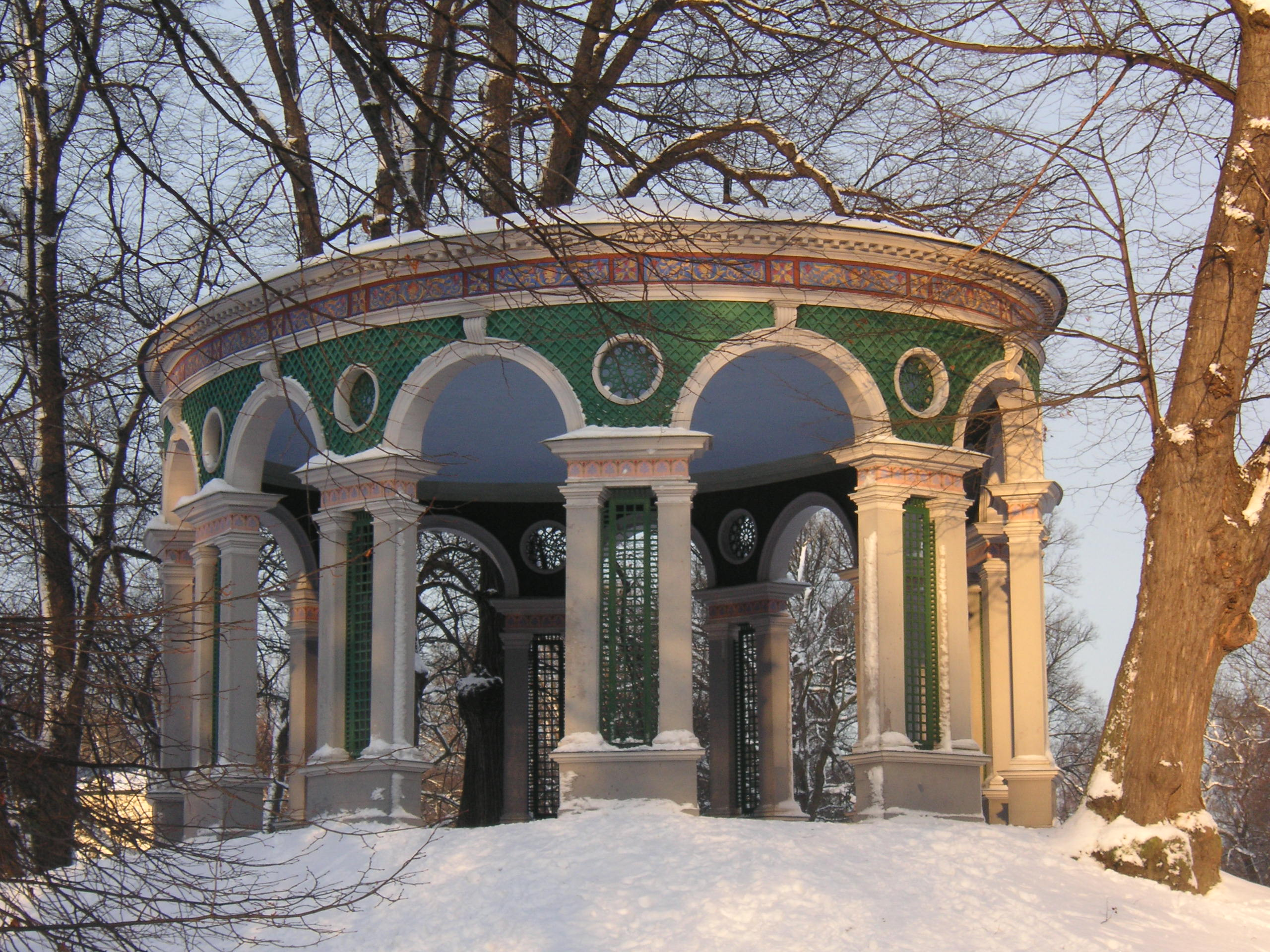
The Echo Temple

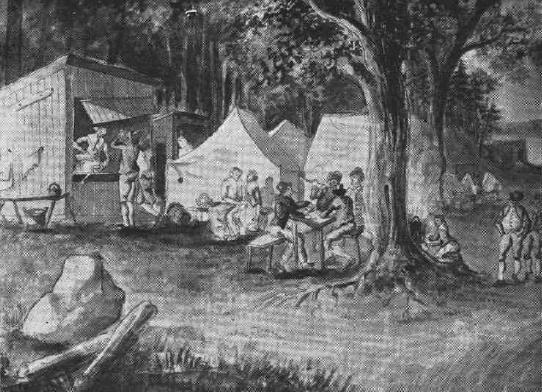
Marketenteri by Pehr Nordqvist 1790s

Events from the year 1790 in Sweden

== Incumbents ==
- Monarch – Gustav III

== Events ==
- March - Norwegian merchants meet Gustaf Mauritz Armfelt, as representative of King Gustav III of Sweden, to discuss military hjelp from Sweden to end the Danish-Norwegian union, at Eda, Sweden.
- April - Ten death sentences is given for participants in the Anjala conspiracy.
- 13 May - Battle of Reval
- 15 May - Battle of Fredrikshamn
- 19 May - Battle of Keltis barracks
- 4 July - Battle of Vyborg Bay (1790)
- 9 July - Battle of Svensksund
- 14 August - Peace between Sweden and Russia in the Treaty of Värälä.
- 8 September - Execution of Johan Henrik Hästesko, the only death sentence of the Anjala conspiracy which is actually performed.
- Anna Maria Engsten awarded with a medal in silver for Valour in Battle at Sea for her act during the Russo-Swedish war.
- Brita Hagberg is awarded with the medal För tapperhet i fält for her military service.
- The noblewomen's social boycott of the monarch is smashed by the arrest of Jeanna von Lantingshausen.
- By royal command, the silk factories are explicitly allowed to employ women workers when no men are available (though women did in practice work in the silk industry earlier), which quickly results in a majority of female workers in the Swedish silk industry.
- The Turku Philharmonic Orchestra is founded.
- The Haga Echo Temple is completed.
- Fredmans epistlar by Carl Michael Bellman
- Den nya skapelsen by Johan Henric Kellgren
- Oden eller asarnes invandring by Carl Gustaf af Leopold

== Births ==
- 19 January – Per Daniel Amadeus Atterbom, writer (died 1855)
- 26 May - Sara Wacklin, writer and educator (died 1846)
- 24 June - Helena Ekblom, religious visionary (died 1859)
- 23 July - Anna Sofia Sevelin, opera singer (died 1871)
- 2 September – Magnus Brahe (1790–1844), politician and military (died 1844)
- 17 September – Israel Hwasser, physician and writer (died 1860)

== Deaths ==
- 16 January - Charlotte Eckerman, opera singer and royal mistress (born 1759)
- 25 June - Lovisa Augusti, opera singer (born 1756)
- Unknown date - Karin Olofsdotter, religious visionary (born 1720)
