= 1862 in Sweden =

- Decades: 1840s; 1850s; 1860s; 1870s; 1880s
- See also: Other events of 1862; Timeline of Swedish history

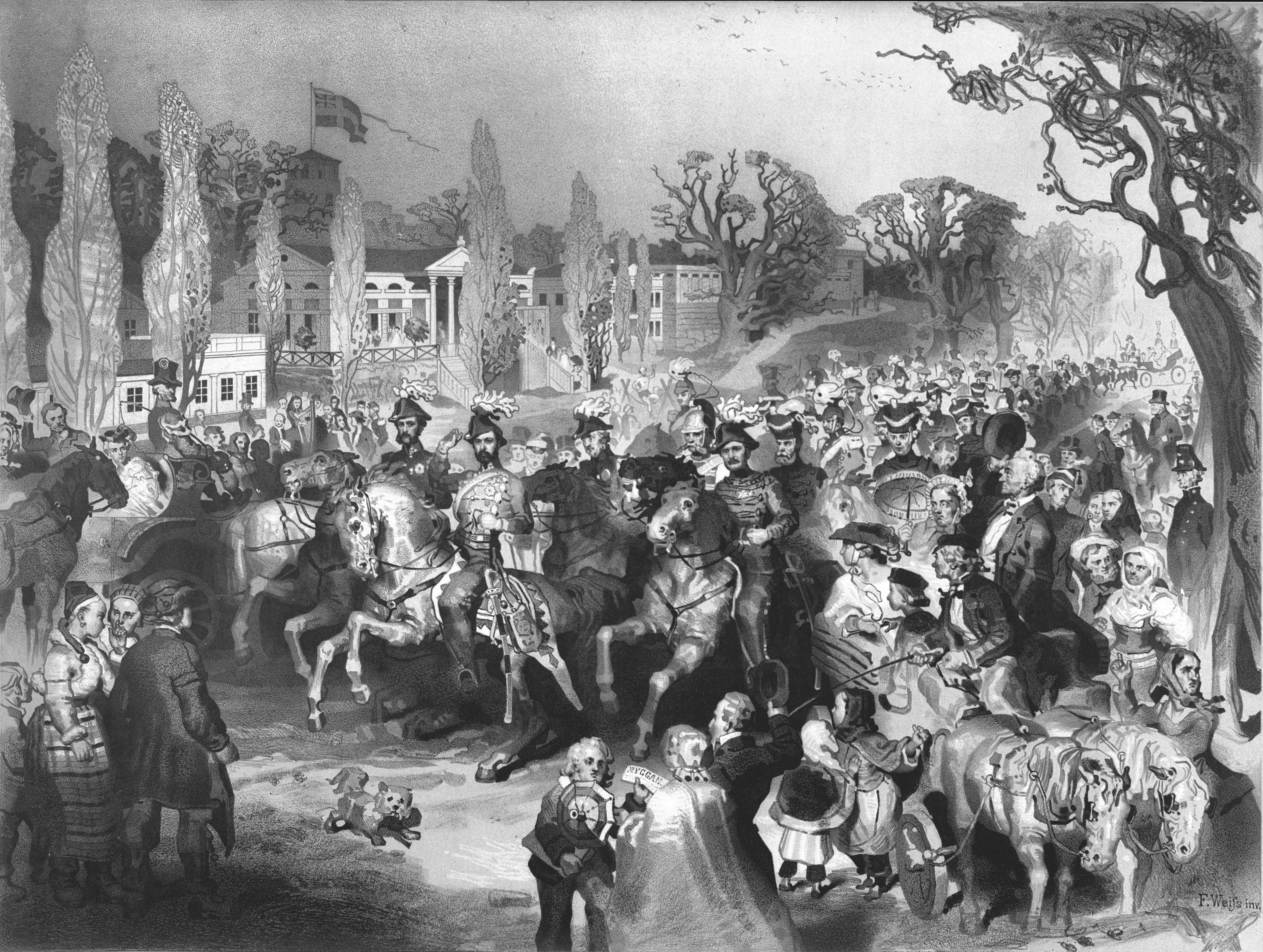

Events from the year 1862 in Sweden

== Incumbents ==
- Monarch – Charles XV

== Events ==
- 18 June - The liberalization of the Swedish economy is completed by the law of free commerce of 1864; all privileges and monopolies of the guilds are abolished, all manners of trade, craftsmanship, industries and other businesses are liberalized and allowed to be practiced freely in both the cities and the countryside by all citizens, regardless of gender, who are either of legal majority or of legal minors who have been given permits of their legal guardians.
- Rudberg publishes a minor revision of his proposal of the Stockholm city plan. A new administrative reform comes into effect.
- Tax-paying women of legal majority (unmarried women, divorced women and widows) are granted the right to vote in municipal elections, making Sweden the first country in the world to grant women the right to vote.
- Queen Louise and Princess Louise takes swimming lessons for the pioneer Nancy Edberg, making swimming socially acceptable for females.
- The theological seminary Johannelunds Teologiska Högskola is founded in Uppsala.
- Peggy Hård is employed as a clerk at a bank office in Stockholm, regarded as a pioneer within the profession of women clerks.

== Births ==
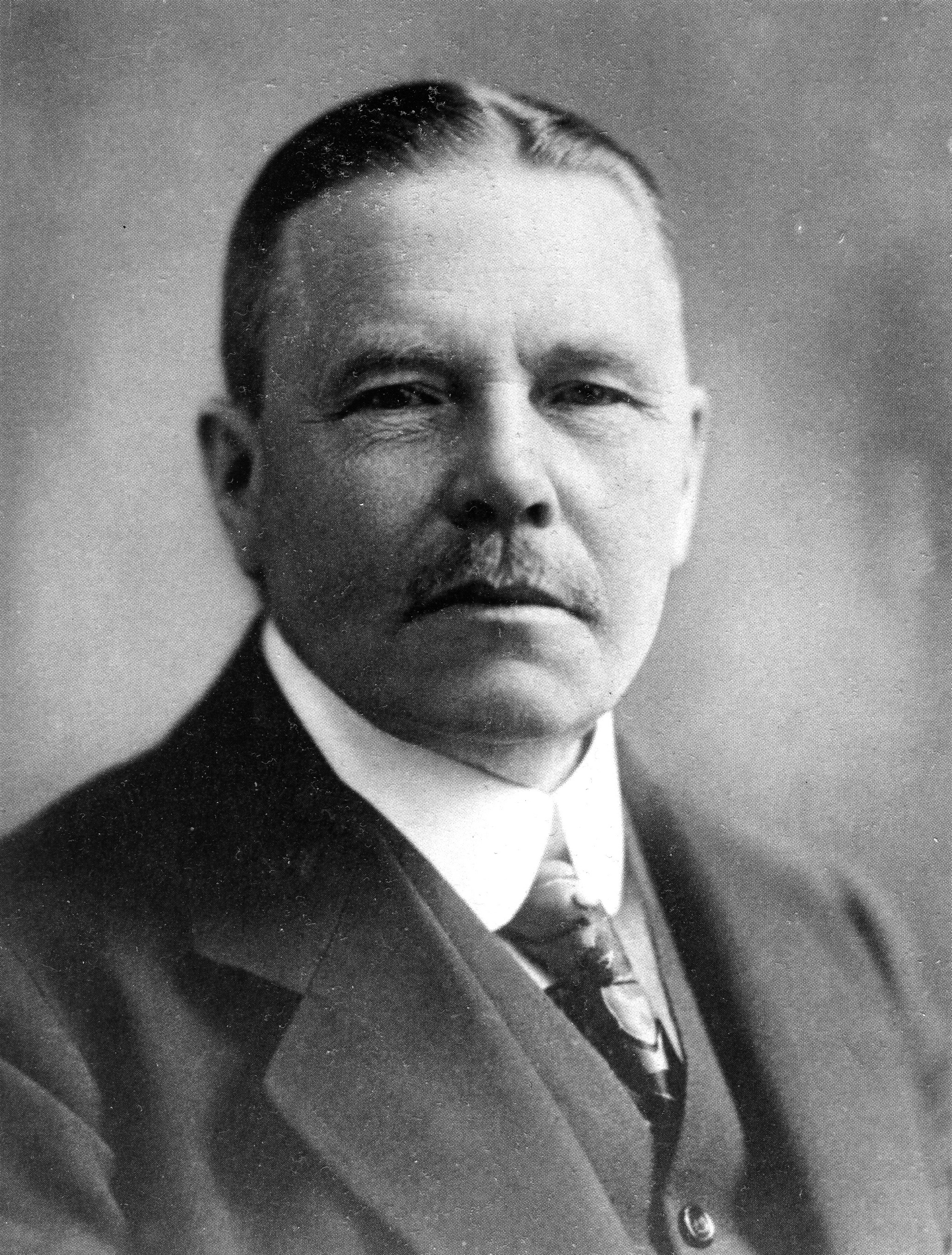
Arvid Lindman, 12th Prime Minister of Sweden.

- 4 February – Hjalmar Hammarskjöld, politician (died 1953)
- 1 April – Carl Charlier, astronomer (died 1934)
- 8 May - Emilie Rathou, temperance and women's rights activist (died 1948)
- 17 July – Oscar Levertin, poet, critic and literary historian (died 1906)
- 18 August – Carl-Emil Johansson, tug-of-war competitor (died 1938).
- 19 September – Arvid Lindman, rear admiral, industrialist and conservative politician (died 1936)
- 24 September – Olof Bergqvist, bishop (died 1940)
- 26 October – Hilma af Klint, painter (died 1944)
- – Alexandra Skoglund, suffragette, women's rights activist and politician (died 1938)

== Deaths ==
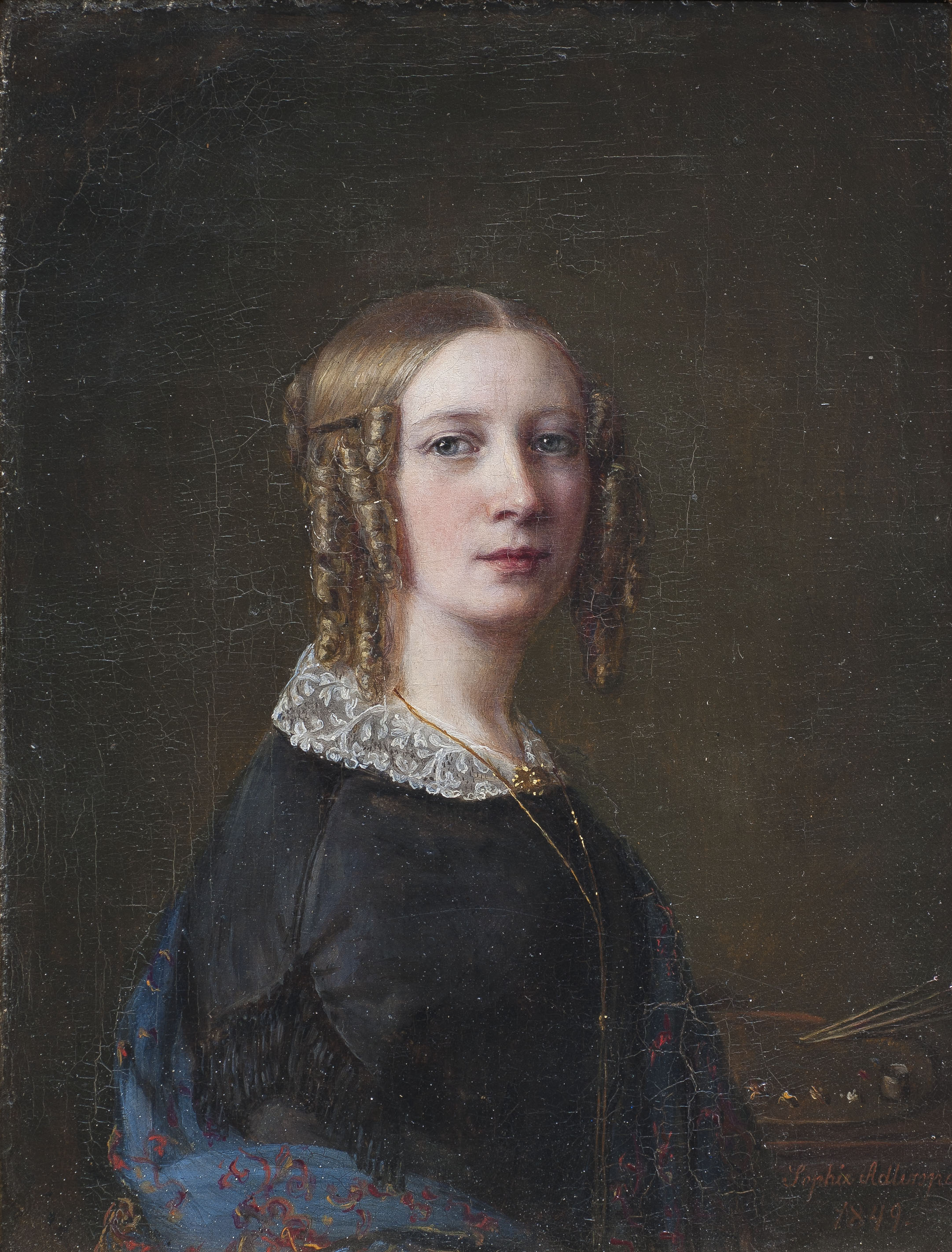
Self-portrait, Sofia Adlersparre.

- 23 March – Sofia Adlersparre, painter (born 1808)
- 21 April – Charlotta Eriksson, actress (born 1794)
- 6 September – Gustaf Erik Pasch, inventor and chemists (born 1788)
- - Charlotta Arfwedson, politically active countess and artist (born 1776)
