= 1868 in Sweden =

- Decades: 1840s; 1850s; 1860s; 1870s; 1880s
- See also: Other events of 1868; Timeline of Swedish history

Events from the year 1868 in Sweden

== Incumbents ==
- Monarch – Charles XV

== Events ==
- 19 September – inauguration of Dalsland Canal.
- 1 November – Folk high school introduced in Sweden.
- Bladin's International School
- United Methodist Church of Sweden
- 30 November – A bronze statue of King Charles XII is unveiled in Stockholm's Kungsträdgården park.

== Births ==
- January 19 – Ebba Atterbom, translator and educator (died 1961)
- February 23 – Anna Hofman-Uddgren, Cabaret singer and movie director (died 1947)
- March 12 – Mary Karadja, writer, spiritualist and princess (died 1943).
- April 7 – Herman Bernhard Lundborg, physician and a race biologist (died 1943)
- April 25 – Ernst Linder, army general who served in the Swedish Army from 1887 to 1918 (died 1943)
- June 29 – Gustaf Nordenskiöld, scholar who was the first to scientifically study the ancient Pueblo ruins in Mesa Verde (died 1895)
- July 24 – Axel Elof Jäderholm, zoologist and botanist (died 1927)
- September 6 – Axel Hägerström, philosopher (died 1939)
- November 15 – Josef Hammar, military surgeon and adventurer (died 1927)
- October 18 – Ernst Didring, leader of the Swedish Red Cross for prisoners of the war between 1915 and 1920. (died 1931)
- December 12 – Axel Petersson Döderhultarn, one of the recognized masters of wood carving (died 1925)
- December 22 – Gustaf Fjæstad, Swedish painter (died 1948)

== Deaths ==
- 3 April – Franz Berwald, composer (born 1796)
- Sofia Ahlbom, artist (born 1803)
- Maria Fredrica von Stedingk, composer (born 1799)
