= 1856 in Sweden =

- Decades: 1830s; 1840s; 1850s; 1860s; 1870s
- See also: Other events of 1856; Timeline of Swedish history

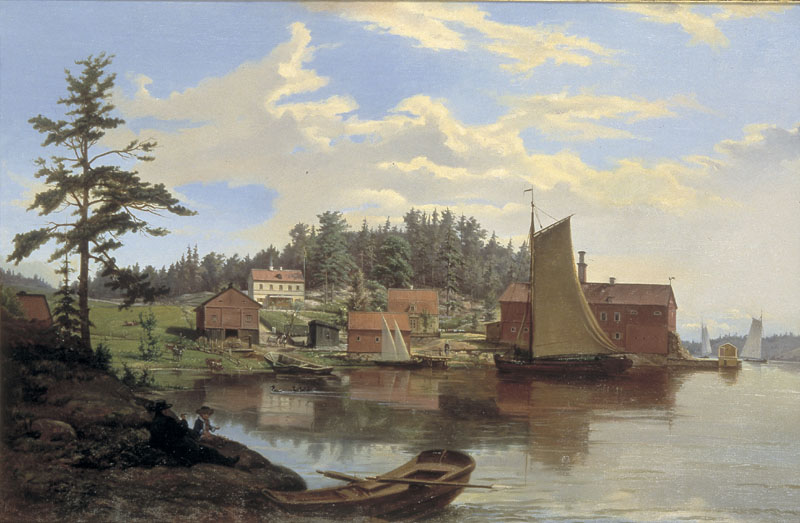

Events from the year 1856 in Sweden

== Incumbents ==
- Monarch – Oscar I

== Events ==
- 7 May - The Swedish Evangelical Mission is established.,
- 29 September - Fredrika Bremer publishes her famous novel Hertha, which contributes to a great debate about reform within women's rights.
- 15 October – André Oscar Wallenberg establishes the Stockholms Enskilda Bank.
- Date unknown – Luleå becomes the seat of Norrbotten County.
- Date unknown - Construction of the Western Main Line, the main railway line between Stockholm and Gothenburg, begins.
- Date unknown - Revision of the Infanticide Act (Sweden).
- Date unknown - Inauguration of the theater Folkan in Stockholm.

== Births ==
- 8 March - Cecilia Milow, author, translator, educator, campaigner and suffragette (died 1946)
- 29 June - Maria Cederschiöld, journalist (died 1935)
- 3 September - Selma Ek, operatic soprano (died 1941)
- 10 December - Karolina Widerström, first female physician (died 1949)
- Anna Sterky, union worker (died 1939)
- Augusta Andersson, restaurant owner (died 1938)

== Deaths ==
- - Elisabeth Charlotta Karsten, painter (born 1789)
- - Charlotta Öberg, poet (born 1818)
