= 1864 in Sweden =

- Decades: 1840s; 1850s; 1860s; 1870s; 1880s
- See also: Other events of 1864; Timeline of Swedish history

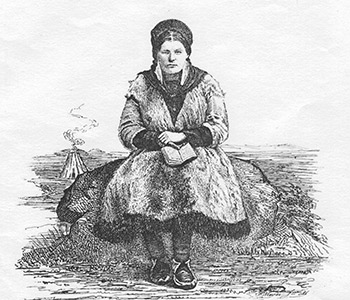
Maria Magdalena Mathsdotter

Events from the year 1864 in Sweden

== Incumbents ==
- Monarch – Charles XV

== Events ==
- The Skandinaviska Banken founded.
- The newspaper Dagens Nyheter begins its publication.
- June 18 – The Decree of Extended Freedom of Trade introduce complete freedom of trade in Sweden: unmarried women are granted the same rights within trade and commerce as men.
- Husbands are forbidden to abuse their wives.
- The gymnastics profession is open to women.
- Queen Louise and Princess Louise take lessons in ice skating from the pioneer Nancy Edberg, making ice skating socially acceptable for females.
- Bertha Valerius appointed official photographer of the royal court.
- Women students are admitted as students at the Royal Swedish Academy of Arts without having to apply for a dispensation.
- Foundation of the Statens normalskola för flickor.
- The famous trip of the Sami Maria Magdalena Mathsdotter to Stockholm.

== Births ==
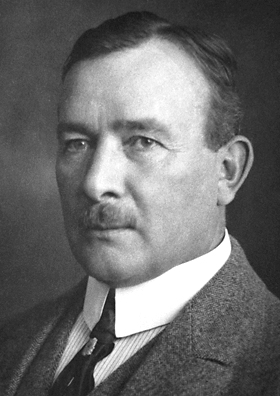
Erik Axel Karlfeldt, recipient of the Nobel Prize in Literature 1931

- 20 January – Mathilda Malling, novelist (died 1942).
- 12 March – Alice Tegnér, composer (died 1943).
- 25 June – Ola Hanson, missionary (died 1927).
- 20 July – Erik Axel Karlfeldt, poet (died 1931).
- 27 November – Gustaf Boivie, sport shooter (died 1951).
- 3 December – Anna Boberg, artist (died 1935).
- 17 December – Felix Körling, composer (died 1937).
- 18 December – Per-Olof Arvidsson, sport shooter (died 1947).

== Deaths ==
- 2 January – Johan Gabriel Richert, jurist and politician (born 1784).
- 25 January – Simon Marcus Larson, artist (born 1825).
- 2 March – Brita Catharina Lidbeck, singer (born 1788).
- 28 May – Charlotta Deland, stage actress (born 1807).
- 4 November – Lotten Wennberg, philanthropist (born 1815).
- 1864 – Wendla Åberg, dancer and actress (born 1791).
