= 1946 in Sweden =

- Decades: 1920s; 1930s; 1940s; 1950s; 1960s
- See also: Other events of 1946; Timeline of Swedish history

Events from the year 1946 in Sweden

== Incumbents ==
- Monarch – Gustaf V
- Prime Minister – Per Albin Hansson, Östen Undén (acting), Tage Erlander

== Events ==
- 25 January – Sweden hands over around 146 Baltic soldiers to the USSR; the handover takes place from the port of Trelleborg and sparks domestic protests.
- 6-11 August – The 10th World Archery Championships takes place in Stockholm, the first edition after WWII.
- 19 November – Sweden joins the United Nations.

== Births ==
- 1 January – Carl B. Hamilton, economist and politician
- 30 April – King Carl XVI Gustaf of Sweden
- 20 June – Lars Vilks, visual artist and activist (died 2021).
- 28 August – Anders Gärderud, runner.
- 14 September –Anna Westberg, novelist and non-fiction writer (died 2005).
- 15 September – Ola Brunkert, drummer (died 2008)
- 16 December – benny Andersson, Swedish musician

== Deaths ==
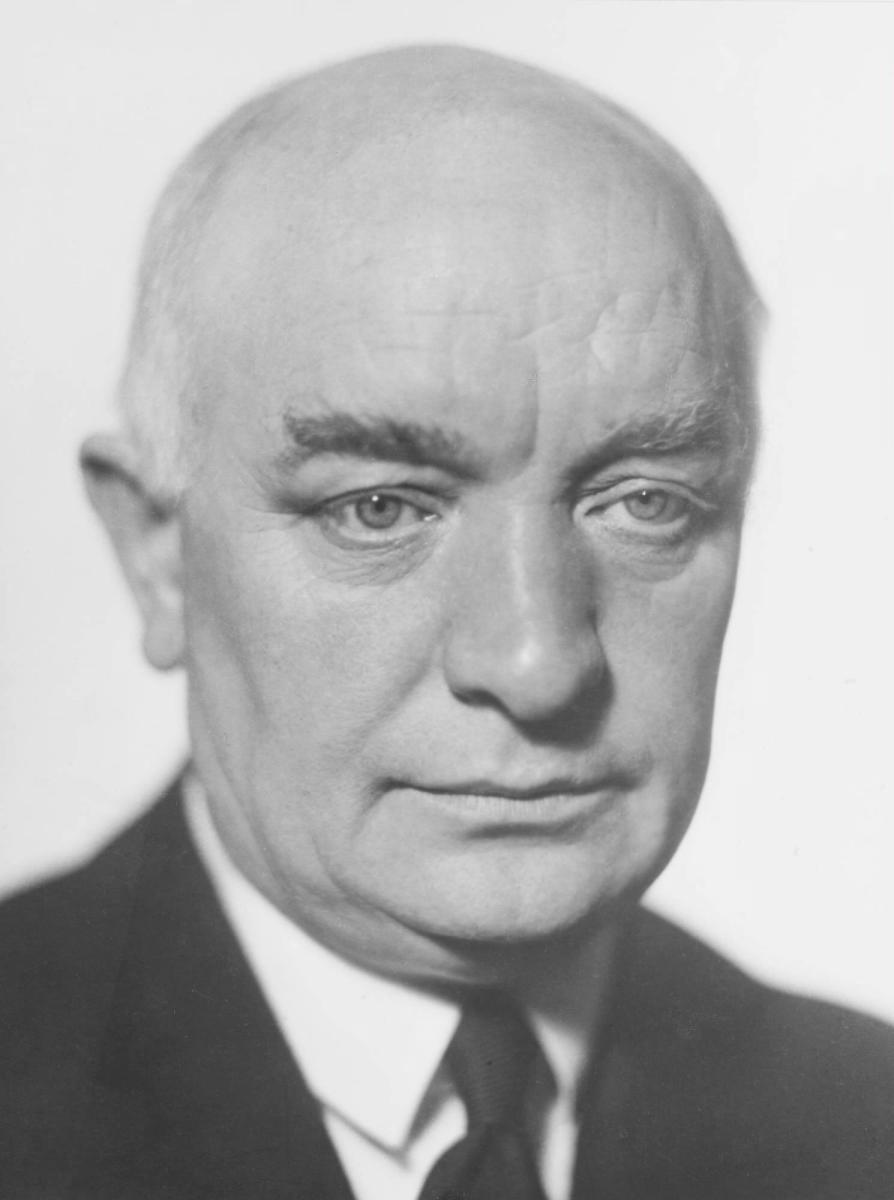
Per Albin Hansson was the 23rd Prime Minister of Sweden.

- 21 February – Gustaf Kilman, horse rider (born 1882).
- 11 March - Carl Lindhagen, politician (born 1860)
- 7 May - Cecilia Milow, author, translator, educator, campaigner and suffragette (born 1856)
- 14 June - Kristian Hellström, athlete (born 1880)
- 6 October – Per Albin Hansson, prime minister (born 1885)
- 16 October - Ebba Bernadotte, morganatic spouse of Prince Oscar Bernadotte and philanthropist (born 1856)
