= 1938 in Sweden =

- Decades: 1910s; 1920s; 1930s; 1940s; 1950s
- See also: Other events of 1938; Timeline of Swedish history

Events from the year 1938 in Sweden

== Incumbents ==
- Monarch – Gustaf V
- Prime Minister – Per Albin Hansson

== Events ==
- 20 December – The Saltsjöbaden Agreement was signed between the Swedish Trade Union Confederation and the Swedish Employers Association.
- Sweden places 4th at the 1938 World Cup.
- Abortion Act of 1938 - Abortion in Sweden was legalized only if the mother's life was in danger, the mother was raped, or on eugenical grounds.

== Births ==
- 28 January – Tomas Lindahl, biochemist, recipient of the Nobel Prize in Chemistry
- 9 March – Lill-Babs, schlager singer (d. 2018)
- 2 April – John Larsson, 17th General of The Salvation Army
- 2 June – Princess Désirée, Baroness Silfverschiöld, royal (d. 2026)
- 11 June – Leif Axmyr, convicted murderer (d. 2018)
- 20 September – Pia Lindström, television journalist
- 4 October – Per Odensten, novelist. (d. 2023)
- 31 December – Lena Cronqvist, artist (d. 2025)

== Deaths ==
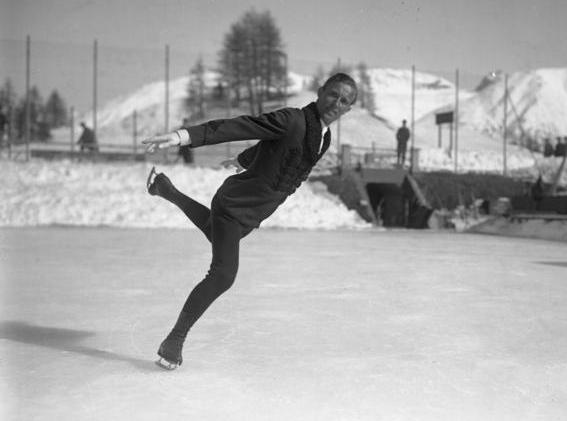
Gillis Grafström won Olympic gold medals in figure skating in 1920, 1924 and 1928, and became world champion in 1922, 1924 and 1929.

- 5 February – Axel Ljung, gymnast (born 1884).
- 14 April – Gillis Grafström, figure skater (born 1893).
- 31 October – August Gustafsson, tug-of-war competitor (born 1875).
- Alexandra Skoglund, suffragette, women's rights activist and politician (born 1862)
- Augusta Andersson, restaurant owner (born 1856)
