= 1948 in Sweden =

- Decades: 1920s; 1930s; 1940s; 1950s; 1960s
- See also: Other events of 1948; Timeline of Swedish history

Events from the year 1948 in Sweden

== Incumbents ==
- Monarch – Gustaf V
- Prime Minister – Tage Erlander

== Events ==
- Easter – Youth riots in Stockholm
- Summer – Violence against Romani people in Jönköping
- 19 September – Swedish general election

== Popular culture ==
=== Literature ===
- Pippi in the South Seas, children's book by Astrid Lindgren

=== Film ===
- Banketten, drama film directed by Hasse Ekman

== Births ==
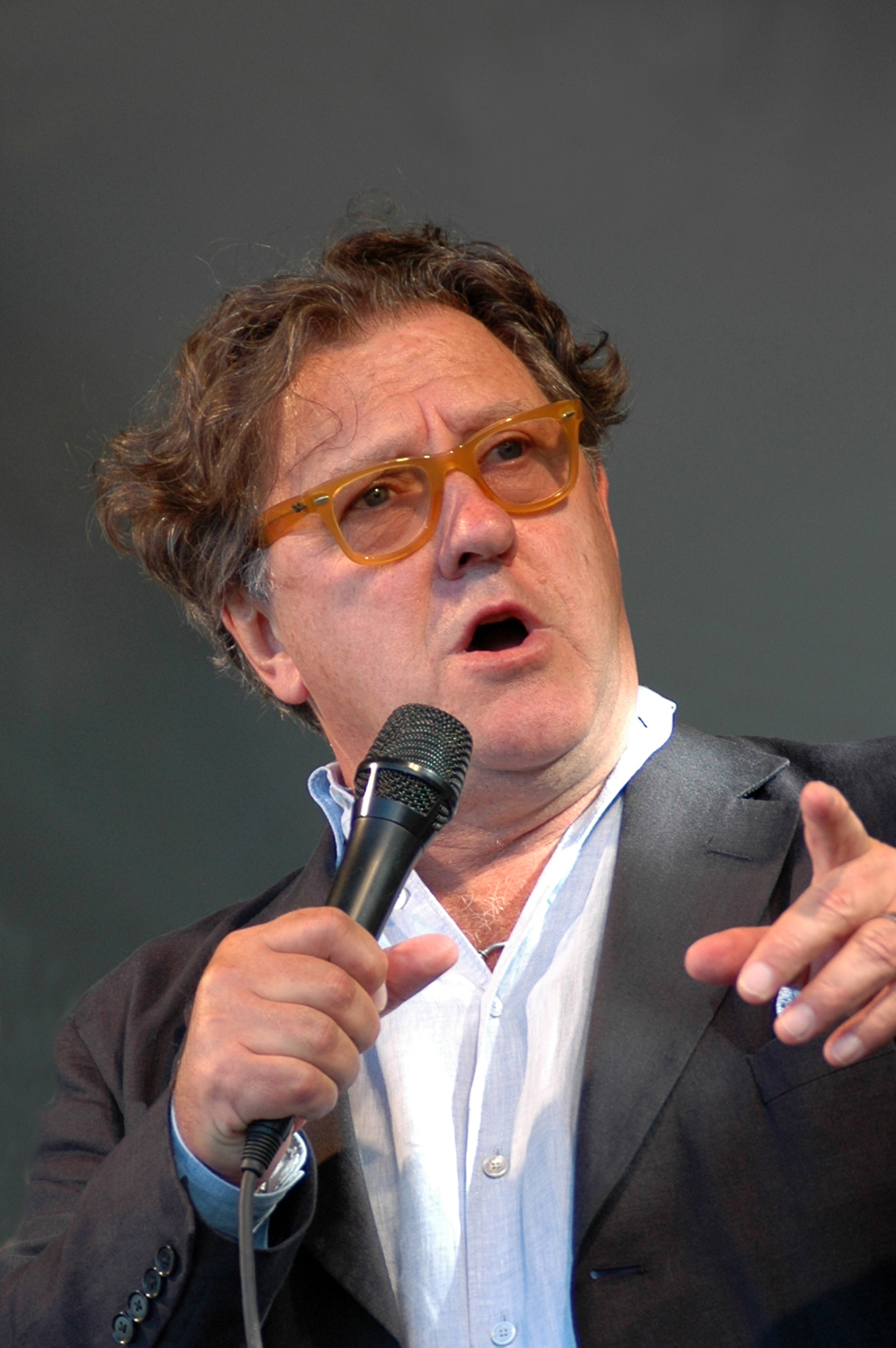
Tommy Körberg

- 26 January – Hasse Andersson, singer and songwriter
- 3 February – Henning Mankell, crime novelist (died 2015)
- 5 February – Sven-Göran Eriksson, football player and manager (died 2024)
- 23 March – Lena Conradson, singer
- 5 April – Dan Söderström, ice-hockey player
- 21 April – Jessica Iwanson, choreographer
- 26 April – Svante Lindqvist, historian
- 5 May – Mats Bergman, actor
- 5 May – Anna Bergman, actress
- 4 July – Tommy Körberg, actor and musician
- 4 September – Anders Åberg, actor (died 2020)
- 11 October – Göran Rosenberg, journalist
- 25 October – Ingrid Sundberg, alpine skier.
- 30 October – Ines Uusmann, politician
- 22 November – Lars Andersson, sprint canoer.

=== Exact date missing ===
- Birgitta Eriksson, politician
- Göran Fristorp, singer and songwriter (died 2024).

== Deaths ==
- 21 March – Gustaf Elgenstierna, historian and genealogist (born 1871)
- 12 October – Emilie Rathou, temperance and women's rights activist (born 1862)
