= 1949 in Sweden =

- Decades: 1920s; 1930s; 1940s; 1950s; 1960s
- See also: Other events of 1949; Timeline of Swedish history

Events from the year 1949 in Sweden:

== Incumbents ==
- Monarch – Gustaf V
- Prime Minister – Tage Erlander

== Events ==
- The Swedish Building Workers' Union founded

== Popular culture ==
=== Film ===
- 29 August – Flickan från tredje raden released
- 17 October – Thirst released
- 9 December – Pippi Longstocking released

=== Sport ===
- 4 to 10 February – the 1949 World Table Tennis Championships were held in Stockholm
- 12 to 20 February – the 1949 World Ice Hockey Championships were held in Stockholm

== Births ==
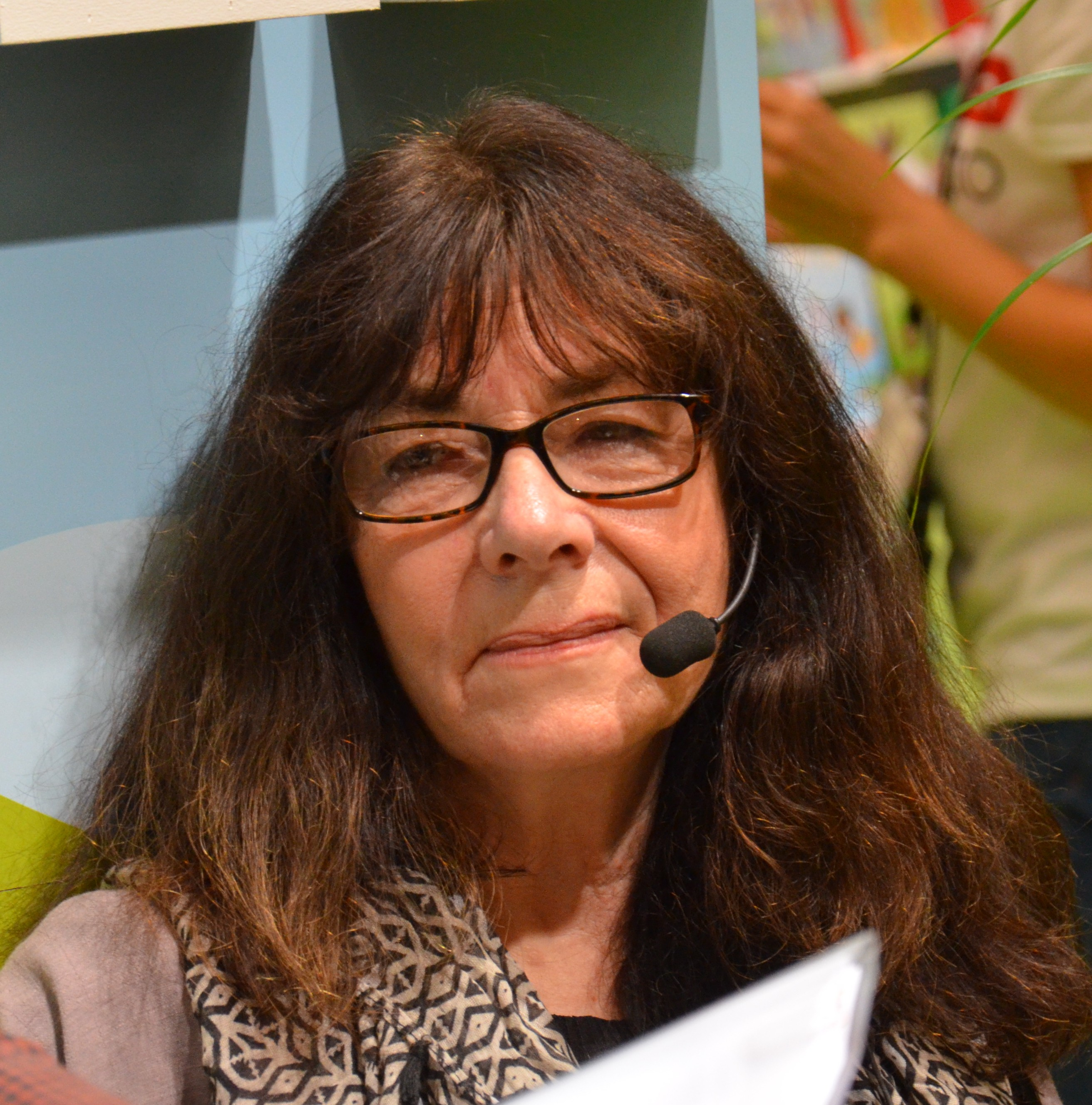
Eva Eriksson

- 2 January – Anders Lidén, Permanent Representative of Sweden to the United Nations
- 15 February – Thomas Callerud, figure skater
- 21 February – Ronnie Hellström, footballer (died 2022)
- 6 April – Janet Ågren, actress
- 13 May – Eva Eriksson, illustrator and writer
- 21 May – Björn Ranelid, writer
- 9 July – Jan Brunstedt, auto racing driver
- 19 July – Bo Bernhardsson, politician
- 16 August – Bo Knape, sailor

== Deaths ==
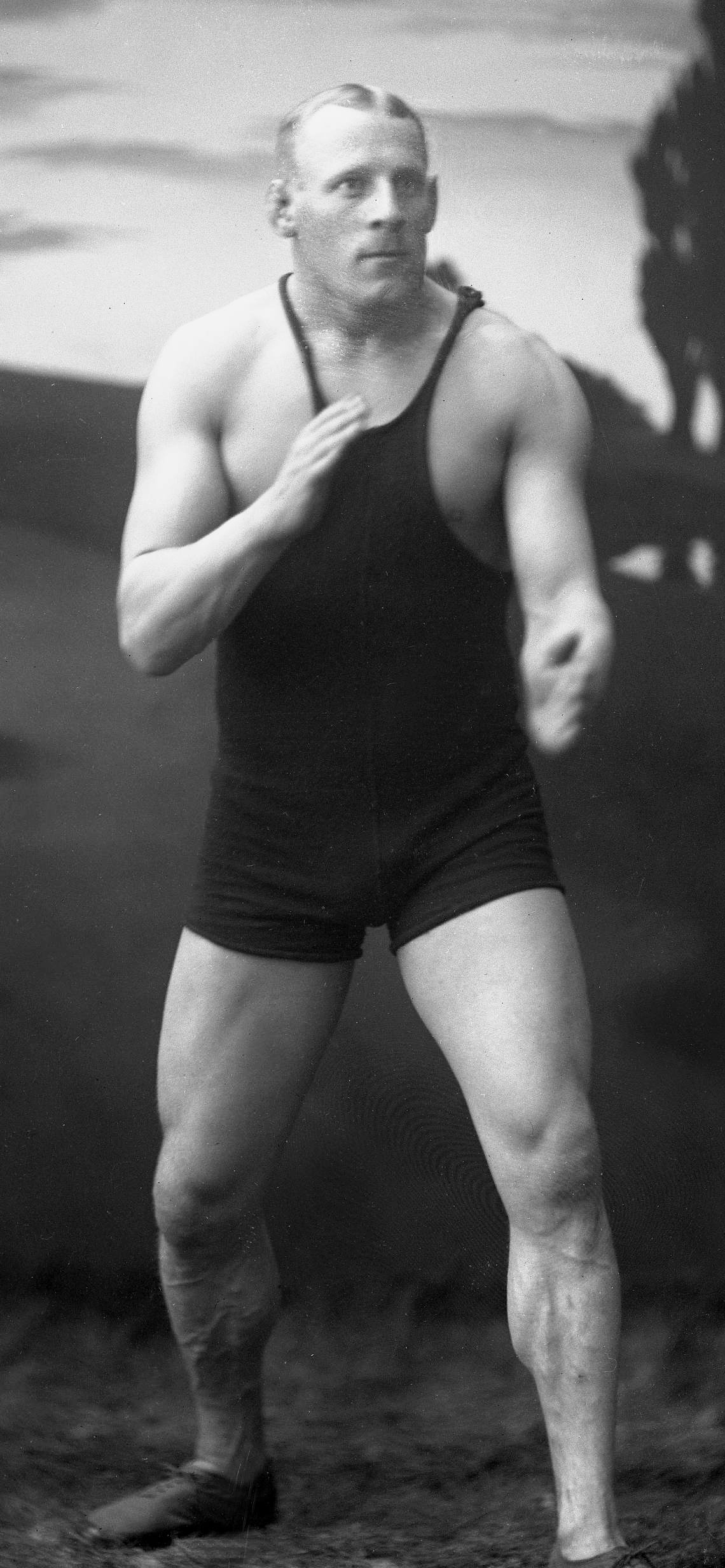
Claes Johanson in 1913

- 28 January – Gustaf Nordqvist, composer, church musician and professor (born 1886)
- 4 March – Karolina Widerström (born 1856)
- 7 March – David Emanuel Wahlberg, sports writer and editor (born 1882)
- 9 March – Claes Johanson, wrestler (born 1884)
- 19 April – Ulrich Salchow, figure skater (born 1877)
- 22 November – John Ekman, film actor (born 1880)
