= 1865 in Sweden =

- Decades: 1840s; 1850s; 1860s; 1870s; 1880s
- See also: Other events of 1865; Timeline of Swedish history

Events from the year 1865 in Sweden

== Incumbents ==
- Monarch – Charles XV

== Events ==
- Inauguration of the Botaniska trädgården (Lund)
- The first issue of the Jönköpings-Posten.
- The Uppsala högre elementarläroverk för flickor is founded.
- Foundation of the Valand Academy
- The Rossander Courses for women starts in Stockholm.

== Births ==
- 26 January – Axel Wallengren, author, poet and journalist (died 1896)
- 19 February – Sven Hedin, geographer, topographer, explorer, photographer, travel writer, and illustrator (died 1952)
- 1 March – Elma Danielsson, Social Democrat, journalist and feminist (died 1936)
- 13 April – Lucie Lagerbielke, writer and painter (died 1931).
- 28 August – Hanna Lindberg, milliner, politician, feminist (died 1951)
- 11 December – Frida Stéenhoff, writer and women's rights activist (died 1945)
- Anna von Zweigbergk, reporter (died 1952)

== Deaths ==
- Helena Larsdotter Westerlund, educator (born 1799)
- 20 November – Anders Lindbäck, vicar and serial killer (born 1803)
- 31 December – Fredrika Bremer, writer (born 1801)
