= 1858 in Sweden =

- Decades: 1830s; 1840s; 1850s; 1860s; 1870s
- See also: Other events of 1858; Timeline of Swedish history

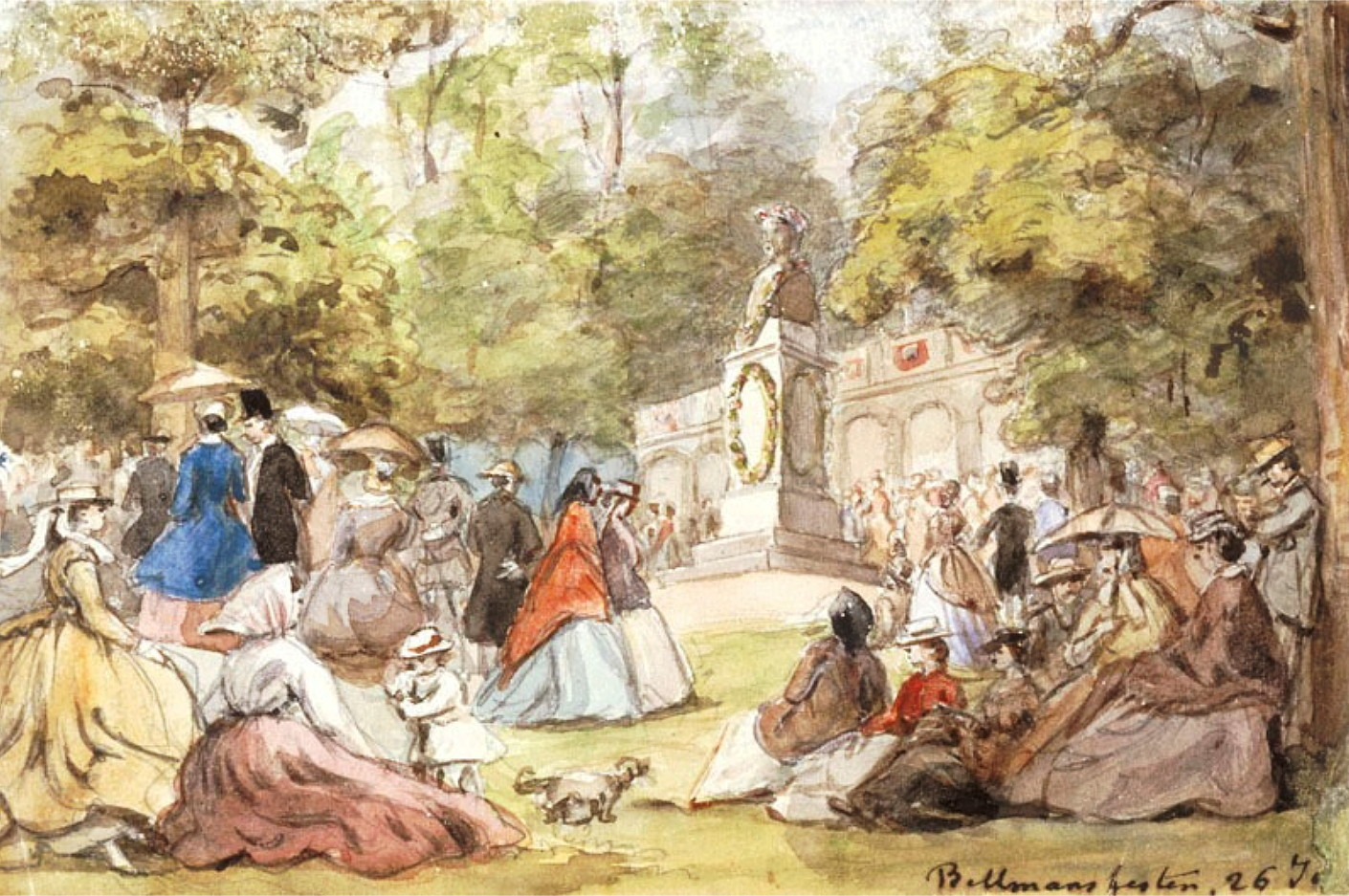

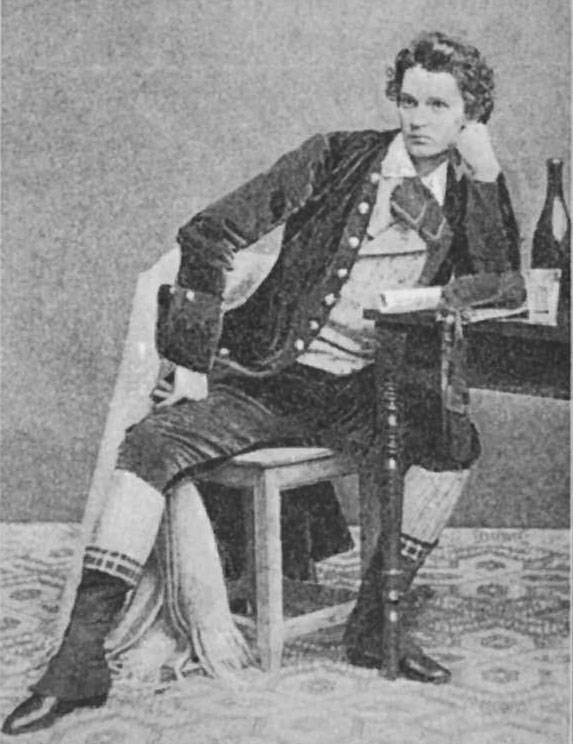
Axel Elmlund (1838–1894) as Richard Brinsley Sheridan in his 20s

Events from the year 1858 in Sweden

== Incumbents ==
- Monarch – Oscar I

== Events ==
- - The Conventicle Act (Sweden) is removed and the free churches are legalized.
- - Establishment of the Geological Survey of Sweden
- - Gothenburg Central Station is inaugurated.
- - Statistics Sweden is created.
- - Inauguration of Vänortsparken
- - Legal majority for unmarried women (if applied for; automatic legal majority in 1863).
- - Louise Flodin starts her own news paper in Arboga, staffed exclusively by women.
- - The formal right of an employer to physically discipline their adult servants is abolished.

== Births ==
- 28 February - Tore Svennberg, actor (died 1941)
- 3 June - Alina Jägerstedt, union worker (died 1919)
- 16 June - Gustaf V, king of sweden (died 29 October 1950)
- 24 October - Ebba Bernadotte, philanthropist and morganatic consort (died 1926)
- 20 November - Selma Lagerlöf, writer (died 1940)
- 18 December - Kata Dalström, political agitator (died 1923)

== Deaths ==
- 30 March - Marie Kinnberg, photographer and painter (born 1806)
- 15 October - Karl Gustaf Mosander, chemist (born 1797)
- Ulla Stenberg, artist (born 1792)
- 2 April – Charlotte Lindmark, ballerina (born 1819)
- 31 December – Vilhelmina Gyldenstolpe, court official (born 1779)
