= 1945 in Sweden =

- Decades: 1920s; 1930s; 1940s; 1950s; 1960s
- See also: Other events of 1945; Timeline of Swedish history

Events from the year 1945 in Sweden

Raoul Gustaf Wallenberg (4 August 1912 – disappeared 17 January 1945) was a Swedish architect, businessman, diplomat, and humanitarian. He saved thousands of Jews in German-occupied Hungary during the Holocaust from German Nazis and Hungarian fascists during the later stages of World War II. While serving as Sweden's special envoy in Budapest between July and December 1944, Wallenberg issued protective passports and sheltered Jews in buildings which he declared as Swedish territory. However On 17 January 1945, during the Siege of Budapest by the Red Army, agents of SMERSH detained Wallenberg on suspicion of espionage, and he subsequently disappeared. In 1957, 12 years after his disappearance, he was reported by Soviet authorities to have died of a suspected myocardial infarction

== Incumbents ==
- Monarch – Gustaf V
- Prime Minister – Per Albin Hansson

== Events ==
- 18 January – The disappearance of the spy Jane Horney.
- 29 January – The Swedish Institute is founded.
- Sweden operated a mission called White Buses to rescue Scandinavian prisoners and bring them back home.

== Births ==
- 12 February – Maud Adams, actress.
- 1 March – Svenne Hedlund, singer. (d. 2022).
- 4 March – Tommy Svensson, football manager and player.
- 25 April – Björn Ulvaeus, musician.
- 13 May – Lasse Berghagen, singer/songwriter (d. 2023).
- 3 June – Bernt Frilén, orienteering competitor, world champion 1974 (d. 2019).
- 1 July – Jane Cederqvist, freestyle swimmer (d. 2023).

== Deaths ==
- 4 January — Ellen Hartman, actress (b. 1860)
- 5 January — Viking Dahl, music composer (b. 1895)
- 5 February — Ragnar Östberg, architect (b. 1866)
- 16 February — Rudolf Värnlund, author (b. 1900)
- 15 June — Carl Gustaf Ekman, politician (b. 1872)
- 16 June — Nils Edén, politician (b. 1871)
- 22 June — Frida Stéenhoff, author (b. 1865)
- 19 November — Ruth Almén, music composer (b. 1870)
