= 1855 in Sweden =

- Decades: 1830s; 1840s; 1850s; 1860s; 1870s
- See also: Other events of 1855; Timeline of Swedish history

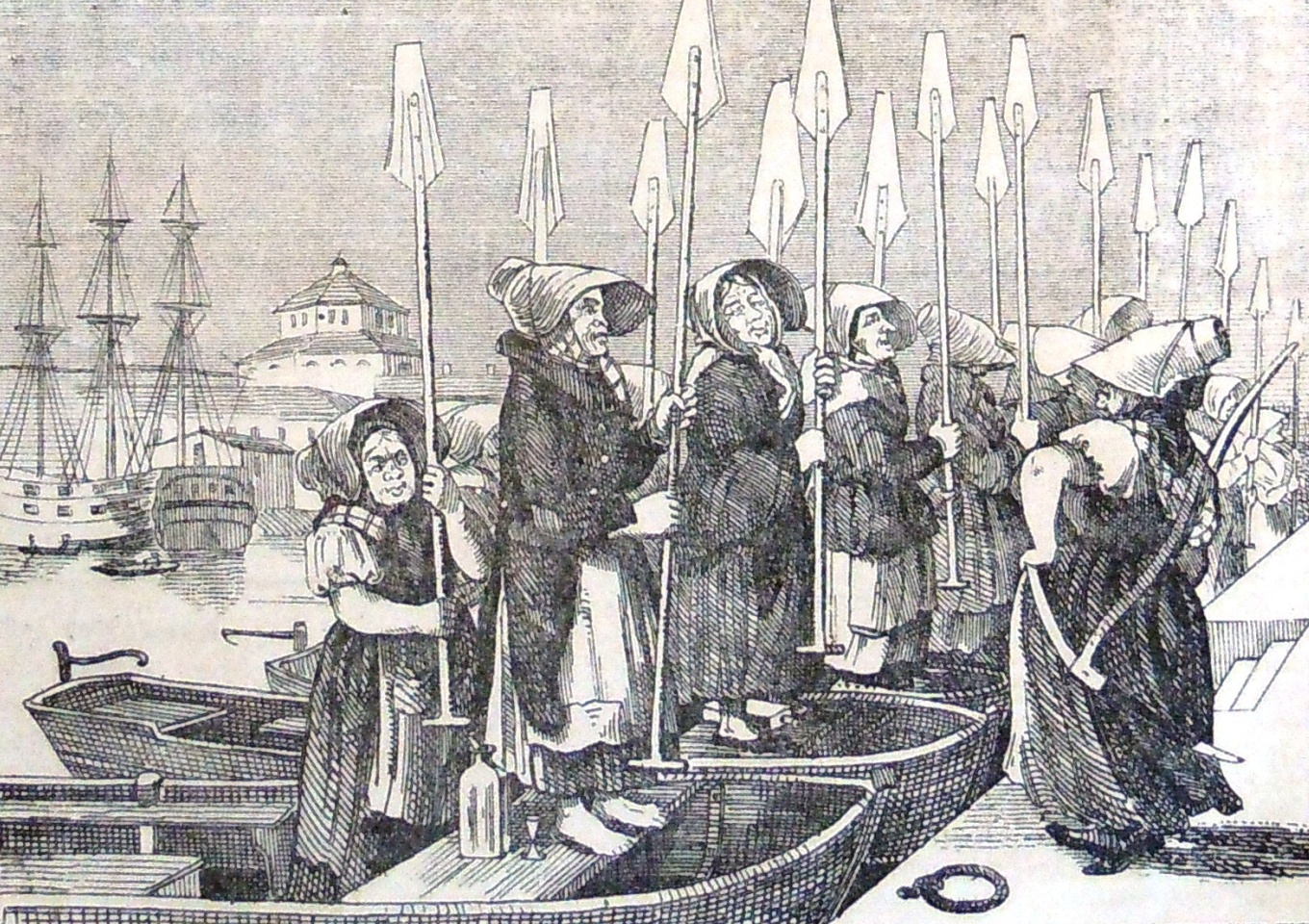
Roddarmadamaren 1855

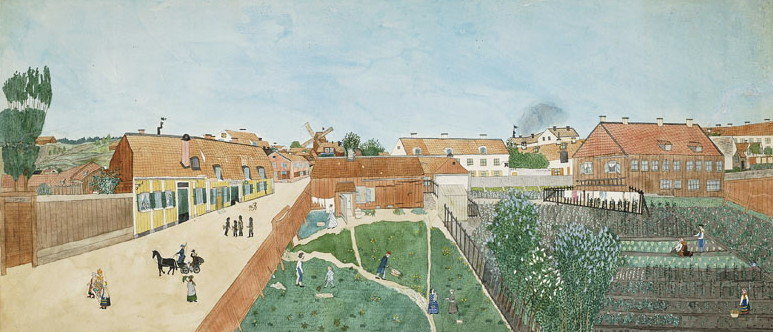
Sjöberg Högbergsgatan in summer, in 1850

Events from the year 1855 in Sweden

== Incumbents ==
- Monarch – Oscar I

== Events ==
- 1 January - The Telegraphynet between the most important cities in Sweden are completed.
- 1 July - The first Swedish Postage stamp.
- 4 May - Kyrkoplikt as well as all remaining forms of Public humiliation and Corporal punishments are abolished.
- - The Great Awakening established in Sweden.
- - Inauguration of the Gothenburg Synagogue.
- - Lea Ahlborn is appointed royal printmaker, which formally makes her the first female civil servant in Sweden.
- - Frederique Hammarstedt takes over the Hammarstedtska skolan.
- - KFUM Jönköping
- - Klosterskolan (Uppsala), the first training college for female teachers, is founded.
- - Svenska lärarinnors pensionsförening (The Society for Retired Female Teachers) is founded by initiative of Josefina Deland.
- - A reform abolishes the use of Pillory and the Pranger, by then already in practice outdated and seldom used.

== Births ==
- 25 April – Hjalmar Lundbohm, geologist and chemist (died 1926)
- 10 June - Hilma Angered Strandberg, writer (died 1927)
- 19 November - Anna Branting, journalist and writer (died 1950)
- 23 September - Ellen Fries, writer (died 1900)
- 7 December - Gunhild Rosén, ballerina and ballet master (died 1928)

== Deaths ==
- 25 January – Carolina Brunström, ballerina (born 1803)
- 15 February - Emilia Uggla, pianist (born 1819)
- 7 May – Wendela Gustafva Sparre, textile artist and a member of the Royal Swedish Academy of Arts (born 1772)
- 27 August – Hans Olov Holmström, bishop (born 1784)
- - Marie Antoinette Petersén, violinist (born 1771)
