= 1950 in Sweden =

- Decades: 1930s; 1940s; 1950s; 1960s; 1970s
- See also: Other events of 1950; Timeline of Swedish history

Events from the year 1950 in Sweden

== Incumbents ==
- Monarch – Gustaf V (died 29 October); Gustaf VI Adolf
- Prime Minister – Tage Erlander

== Events ==
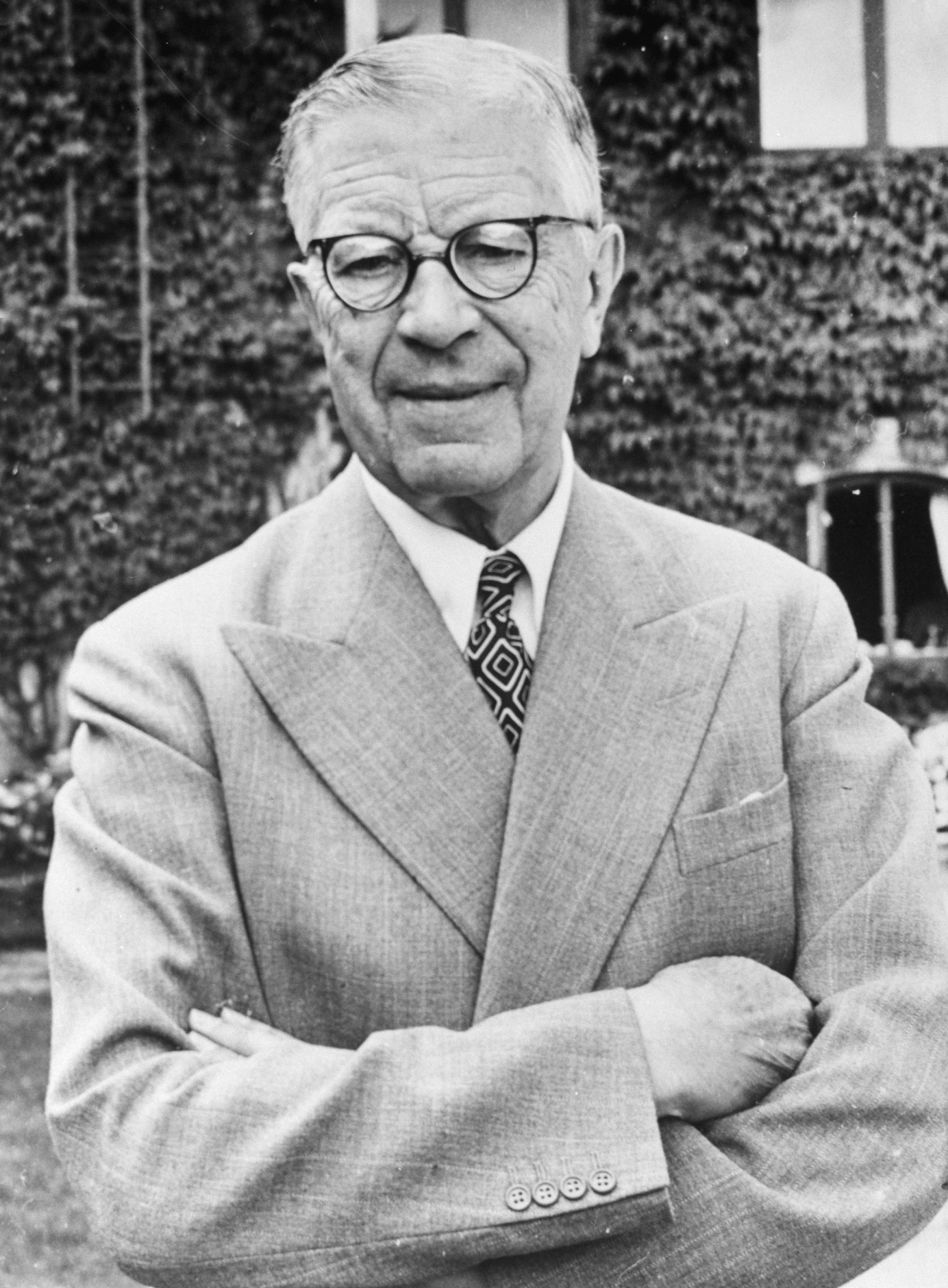
Gustaf VI Adolf

- 29 October – Gustaf VI Adolf became King of Sweden, succeeding his father Gustaf V

== Popular culture ==
=== Film ===
- 26 December – The White Cat released
- 18 September – Jack of Hearts released

== Births ==
- 13 February – Ewa Aulin, actress
- 21 February – Håkan Nesser, author and teacher
- 21 March – Anders Linderoth, football player and coach
- 28 March – Roland Andersson, football player and coach
- 5 April
  - Agnetha Fältskog, singer
  - Harpo, singer
- 2 May – Yngve Kalin, priest and church leader
- 28 June – Mauricio Rojas, Chilean-Swedish politician
- 2 July – Annika Thor, author and screenwriter
- 14 September – Monica Forsberg, singer, songwriter and actress
- 24 September – Kristina Wayborn, actress
- 1 October – Stefan Krook, sailor.
- 4 November – Benny Wendt, footballer
- 21 November – Marie Bergman, singer
- 6 December – Christina Lindberg, actress, model and journalist

== Deaths ==
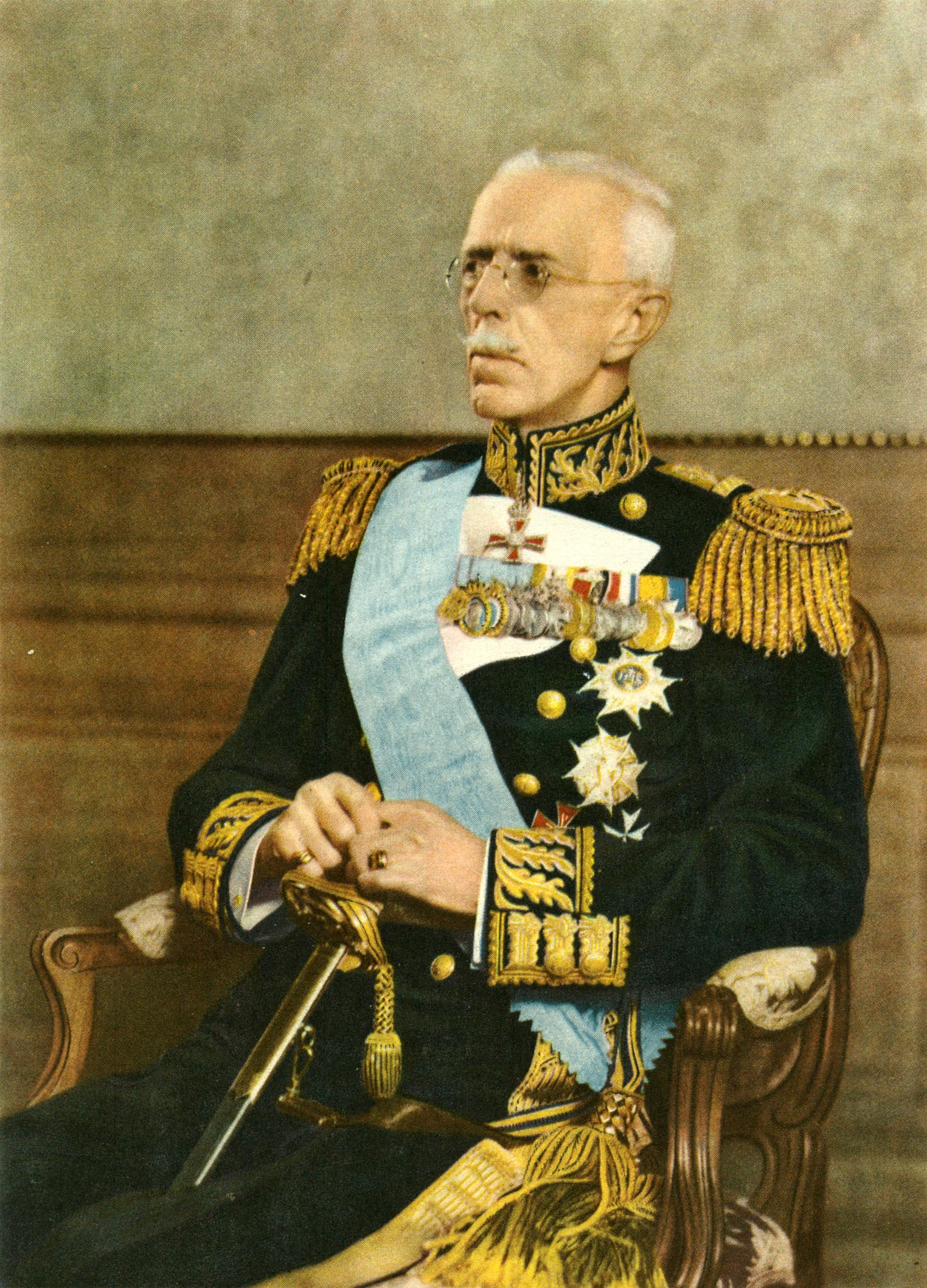
Gustaf V, King of Sweden from 1907 to 1950

- 13 July – Gustaf Svensson, sailor (born 1882)
- 7 September – Hedda Andersson, female doctor (born 1861)
- 18 October – Per Bergman, sailor (born 1886)
- 29 October – Gustaf V, King of Sweden from 1907 to 1950 (born 1858)
- 29 November – Helge Ekroth, football player (born 1892).
