= 1859 in Sweden =

- Decades: 1830s; 1840s; 1850s; 1860s; 1870s
- See also: Other events of 1859; Timeline of Swedish history

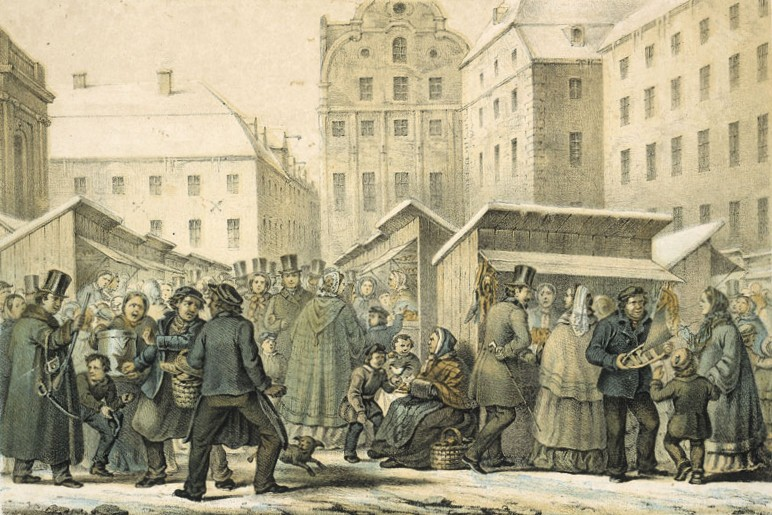
Gamla stans julmarknad 1859

Events from the year 1859 in Sweden

== Incumbents ==
- Monarch – Oscar I, then Charles XV

== Events ==
- 8 July – Charles XV succeeded his father Oscar I of Sweden
- The Swedish Art Music Society is founded.
- Inauguration of the Stora Teatern in Gothenburg.
- The beginning of the Tidskrift för hemmet, the first women's magazine in the Nordic countries.
- The post of college teacher and lower official at public institutions are open to women.
- The first institute for the intellectually disabled is founded by Sophia Wilkens.
- The first seminar for adult women, Lärokurs för fruntimmer is opened in the capital, resulting in the foundation of the Royal Seminary two years later.
- Women are explicitly permitted to engage freely and without restrictions in any type of retail business in both the cities as well as the countryside and to manage village general stores without inheriting them (married women, however, would as minors still be obliged to provide a permit from their spouse as well).

== Births ==
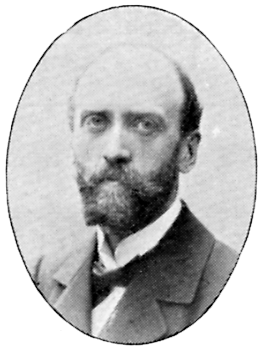
Axel Jungstedt.

- 19 February – Svante Arrhenius, scientist (died 1927)
- 17 March – Axel Jungstedt, painter (died 1933).
- 6 July – Verner von Heidenstam, poet and novelist (died 1940)
- 16 August – Carl Boberg, poet (died 1940)
- 3 October – Karin Larsson, artist and designer (died 1928)
- 15 November – Prince Oscar Bernadotte, royalty (died 1953)
- Augusta Jansson, entrepreneur (died 1932)

== Deaths ==
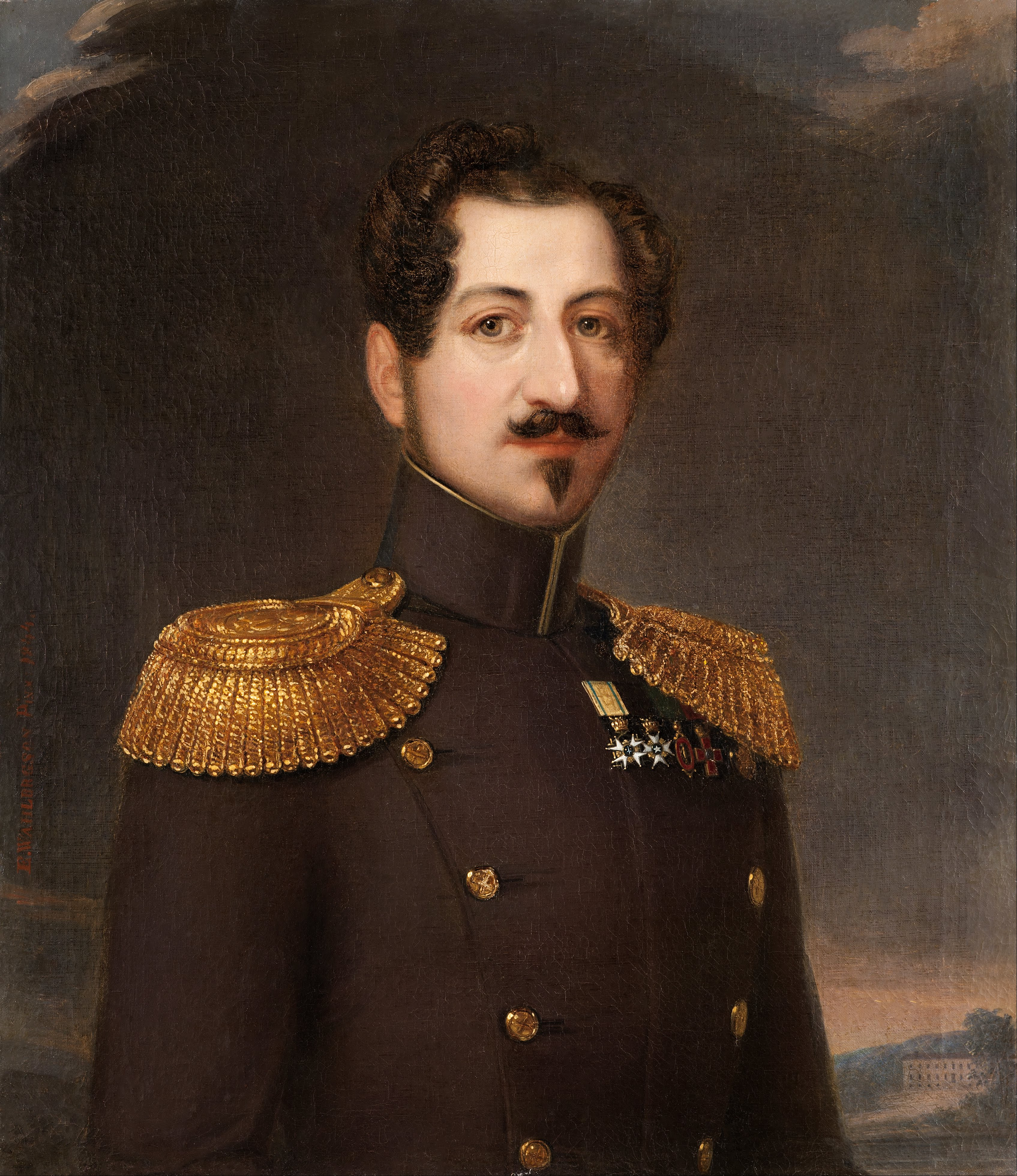
Oscar I of Sweden.

- 10 January - Emilie Petersen, landowner and philanthropist (born 1780)
- 23 January - Helena Ekblom, religious preacher and visionary (born 1790)
- 3 May – Anders Gustaf Dahlbom, entomologist (born 1806)
- 18 June – Sara Torsslow, actress (born 1795)
- 8 July – Oscar I, king of Sweden and Norway (born 1799).
- 6 September – Carl Gustaf Kröningssvärd, lawyer and politician (born 1786)
