= 1860 in Sweden =

- Decades: 1840s; 1850s; 1860s; 1870s; 1880s
- See also: Other events of 1860; Timeline of Swedish history

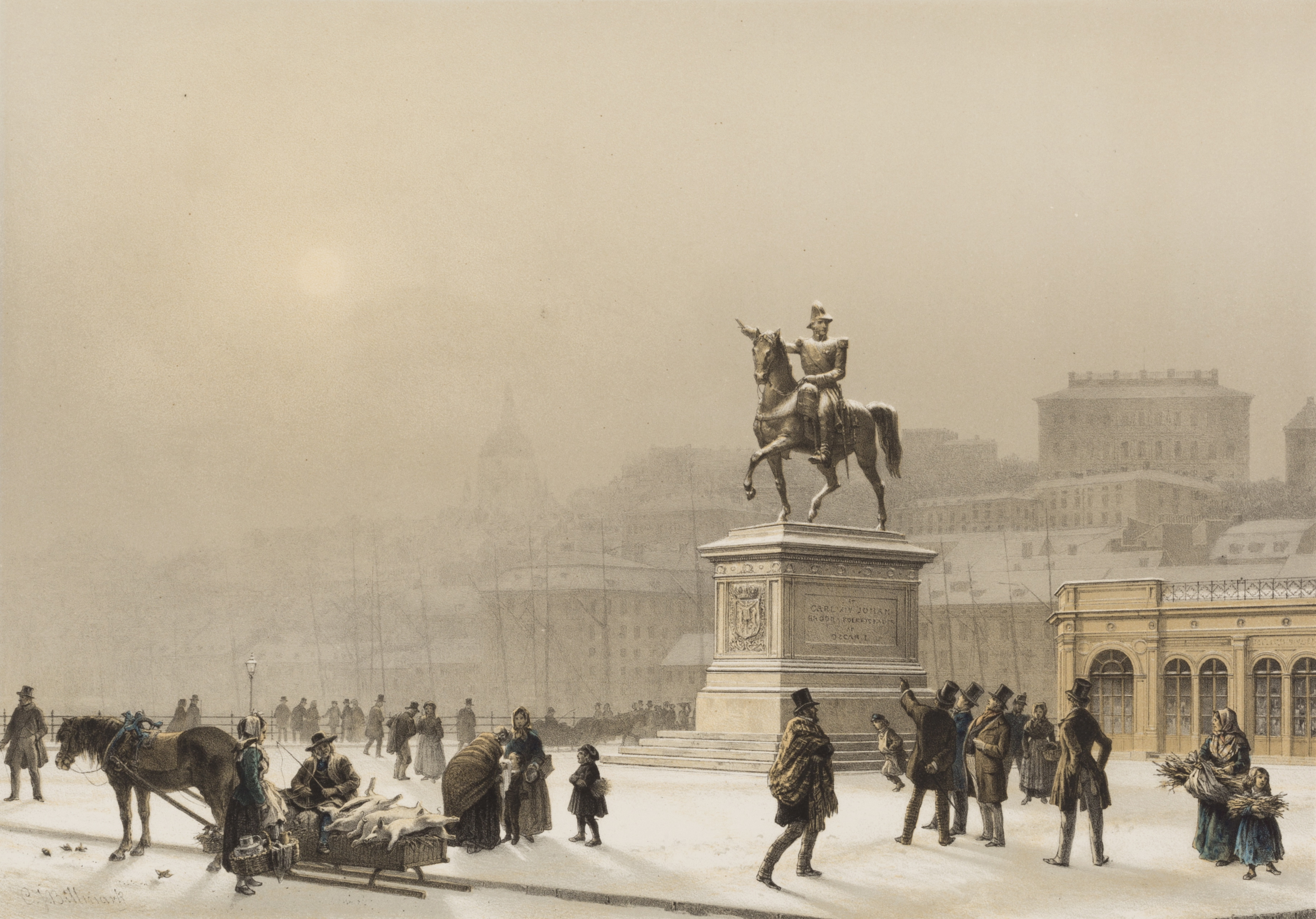
Charles XIV John's statue, in Billmark 1860

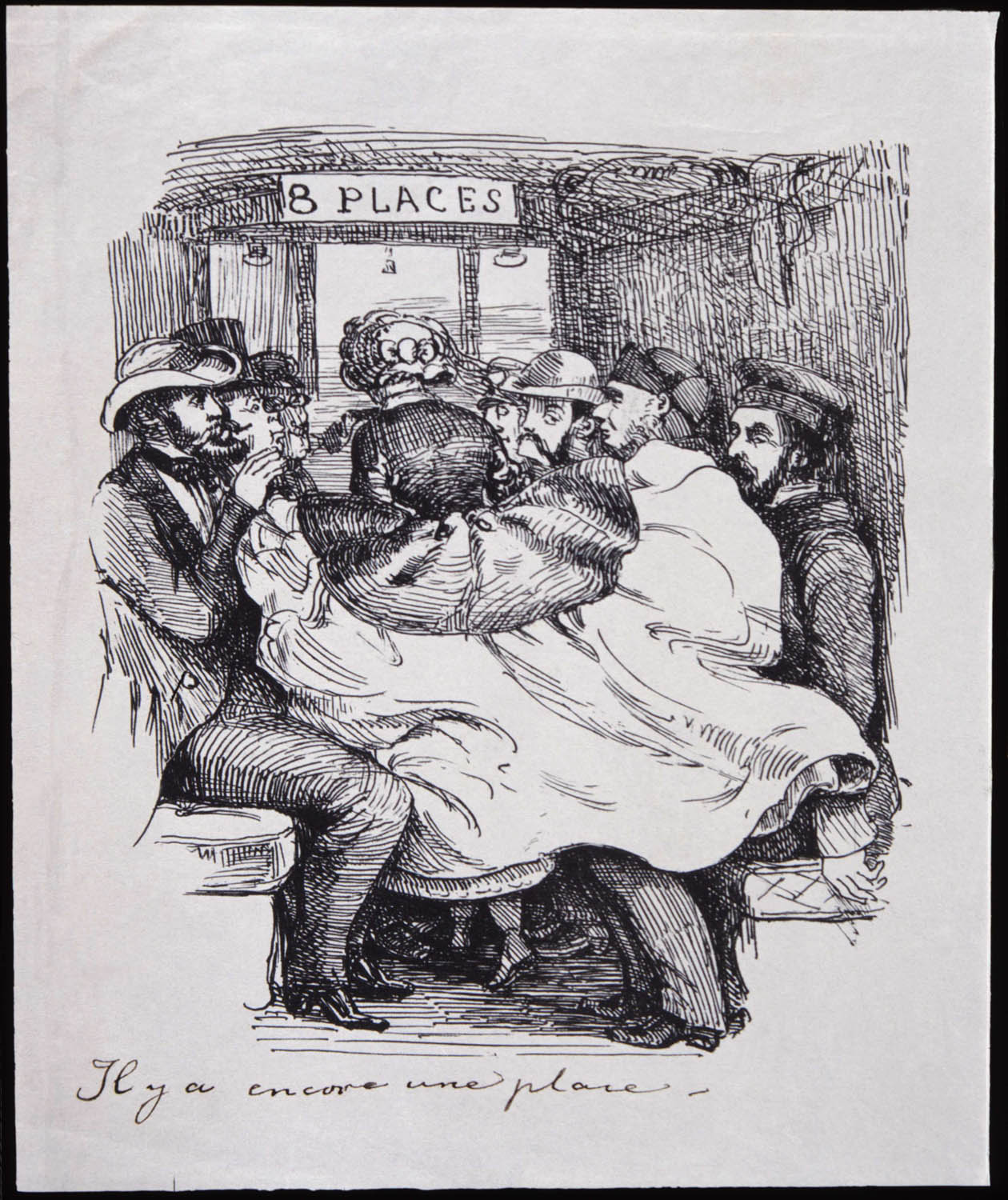

Events from the year 1860 in Sweden

== Incumbents ==
- Monarch – Charles XV

== Events ==
- A.E. Schwabitz and A.E. Rudberg produces a proposal for the regulation of Gamla stan.
- The Dissenter Acts (Sweden) allow citizens to leave the state church.
- Kamewa is created.
- Royal Gothenburg Yacht Club is founded.
- The internal passport, until then needed to travel inside the country, is abolished.
- Jeanette Berglind founds the pioneer institution Tysta Skolan (Silent School) for the deaf in Stockholm.

== Births ==
- 21 January – Karl Staaff, prime minister (died 1915)
- 7 February – Anna Norrie, actress (died 1957)
- 18 February – Anders Zorn, painter (died 1920)
- 28 May – Sigrid Elmblad, writer and translator (died 1926)
- 31 July - Ellen Hartman, actress (died 1945)
- 10 August – Caroline Boman Hansen, Swedish–Norwegian hotelier (died 1956).
- Elin Engström, politician (Social Democrat), trade unionist and women's right activist (died 1956)
- 17 December - Carl Lindhagen, politician (died 1926)

== Deaths ==
- 11 May – Israel Hwasser, physician and writer, member of the Swedish Academy (born 1790)
- 10 August – Sara Augusta Malmborg, singer, pianist and painter (born 1810)
- 17 December – Désirée Clary, queen dowager (born 1777)
- - Kloka Anna, cunning woman (born 1797)
- - Ebba d'Aubert, pianist (born 1819)
