= 1788 in Sweden =

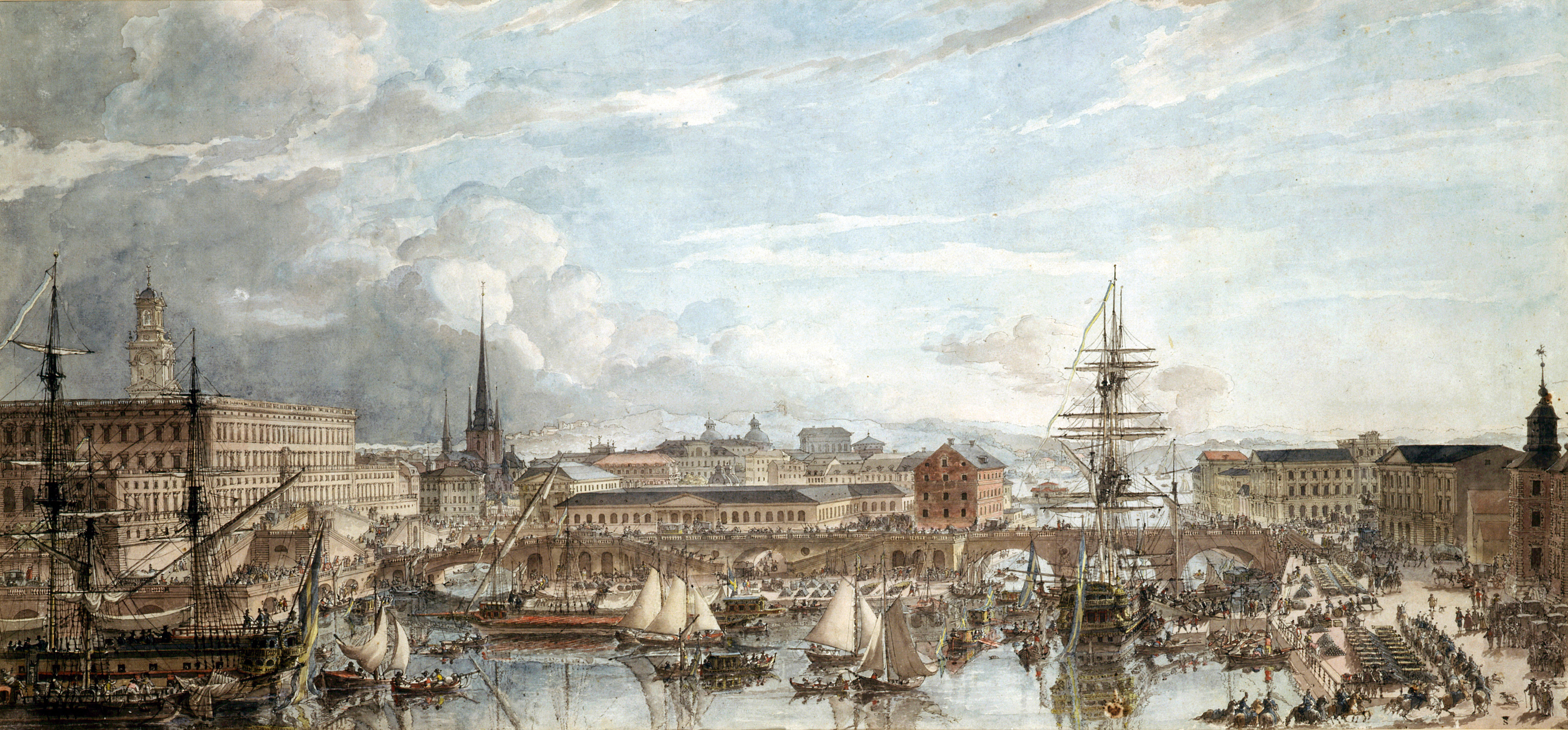
Desprez-Swedish war preparations 1788

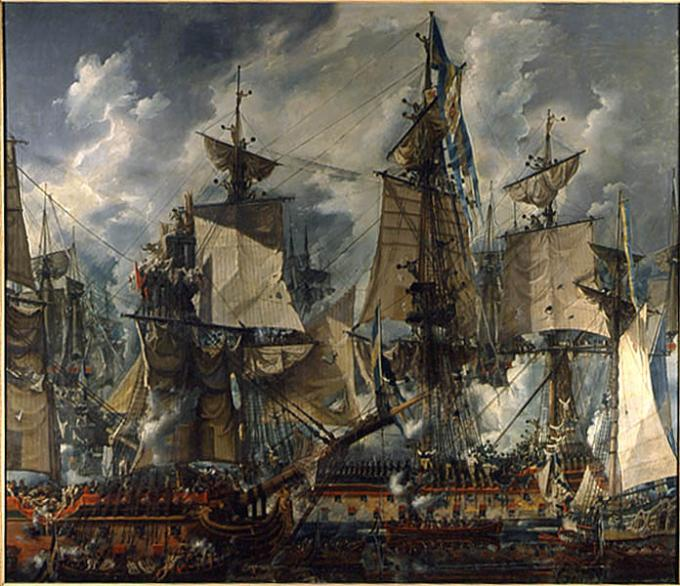
Desprez - Battle of Hogland

Events from the year 1788 in Sweden

== Incumbents ==
- Monarch – Gustav III

== Events ==
- 25 May - The Royal Dramatic Theatre is inaugurated in Bollhuset in Stockholm.
- 28 June - The outbreak of the Russo-Swedish War (1788–90).
- 17 July - Battle of Hogland
- 8 August - Anjala conspiracy
- - Lovisa Augusti, Caroline Müller and Franziska Stading are inducted to the Royal Swedish Academy of Music.
- - The Sofia Albertina Church is completed.
- - Aurora Liljenroth graduates from a gymnasium (school), which is unique for a female and attracts a great deal of attention.
- - Count Adolph Ribbing and Baron Hans Henrik von Essen; the duel was held because Essen's proposal had been accepted by the father of a woman, the heiress Charlotta Eleonora De Geer, whom Ribbing had also proposed to and whom he believed to be in love with him. Essen was injured and Ribbing declared winner. The duel was regarded a scandal and a crime against the king.

== Births ==
- 30 July - Kisamor, herbalist and natural doctor (died 1842)
- 3 September - Gustaf Erik Pasch, inventor and chemists (died 1862)
- - Brita Catharina Lidbeck, concert vocalist (died 1864)

== Deaths ==
- - Bakelse-Jeanna, street seller and local profile (born 1702)
