= Bladins International School of Malmö =

International school in Malmö, Sweden

Coordinates: 55°35′40″N 12°58′28″E

Bladins International School of Malmö is an international school associated with Stiftelsen Bladins Skola, an old Swedish independent school founded in 1868 and located in the heart of Malmö, Sweden. It offers education to students ranging from 3 to 18. The school itself consists of an international pre-school, an IBO international school. The international school is accredited by the International Baccalaureate Organization and offers the PYP (Primary Years Programme), MYP (Middle Years Programme) and the Diploma Programme. In 2008, Bladins was awarded as the best school in Sweden, as the international side ninth graders achieved the highest grade point average throughout the whole of Sweden.

== History ==
The International School was founded in 1987. At the time, Kockums, the Swedish submarine and ship manufacturer, won a contract to build submarines for the Australian navy. The region needed an International School for the Australian expatriate community. The International School was born.

Bladins International School now has more than 300 students of 30 different nationalities. It offers an international education for students between 3 and 16 years. All teaching is in English and under the umbrella of the International Baccalaureate Organisation (IBO), which develops the IBO curriculum.

In 1995 Bladins International School was the only school in Sweden to be authorised by the IBO to teach the Middle Years Programme for pupils aged 11 to 16. Since 2000, it has been authorised to teach the Primary Years Programme for pupils aged 3 to 11. As an IB school, the education is similar to all other 1,895 IB world schools, based in 124 countries.
