= 1944 in Sweden =

- Decades: 1920s; 1930s; 1940s; 1950s; 1960s
- See also: Other events of 1944; Timeline of Swedish history

Events from the year 1944 in Sweden

== Incumbents ==
- Monarch – Gustaf V
- Prime Minister – Per Albin Hansson

== Events ==
- 30 January – Swedish Confederation of Professional Employees is founded.
- 11 April – Skirmish at Sövde

== Births ==
- 17 January – Jan Guillou, author
- 26 May – Rune Lindström, alpine skier
- 7 June – Erling Wicklund, Swedish-Norwegian trombonist, composer, and journalist (died 2019)

== Deaths ==
- 5 July – Torine Torines, mechanic (born 1876)
- 14 July – Emil Fjellström, actor (born 1884)
- 8 October – Elsa Lindberg-Dovlette, writer and princess of Persia (born 1874)
