= 1940 in Sweden =

- Decades: 1920s; 1930s; 1940s; 1950s; 1960s
- See also: Other events of 1940; Timeline of Swedish history

Events from the year 1940 in Sweden

== Incumbents ==
- Monarch – Gustaf V
- Prime Minister – Per Albin Hansson

== Events ==
- 21 February – Pajala is bombed by Soviet aircraft.
- 3 March – Anti-communists plant an explosive device in the office of left-wing newspaper Norrskensflamman in Luleå. The attack kills five people, including two children. It is one of the deadliest political attacks in modern Swedish history.
- 28 March – Establishment of the anti-Nazi Swedish language political magazine, Nordens Frihet by Samfundet Nordens Frihet.
- April – Initiation of regular transit of German troops through Sweden to and from Norway.
- 24 October – A ferry carrying members of the Boden Engineer Regiment capsizes on Lake Armasjärvi southwest of Övertorneå during a night crossing in poor weather; 46 men are killed.
- 30 December – Victor Hasselblad forms the Victor Hasselblad AB Camera Company.

=== Undated ===
- Establishment of art magazine, Paletten.

== Births ==
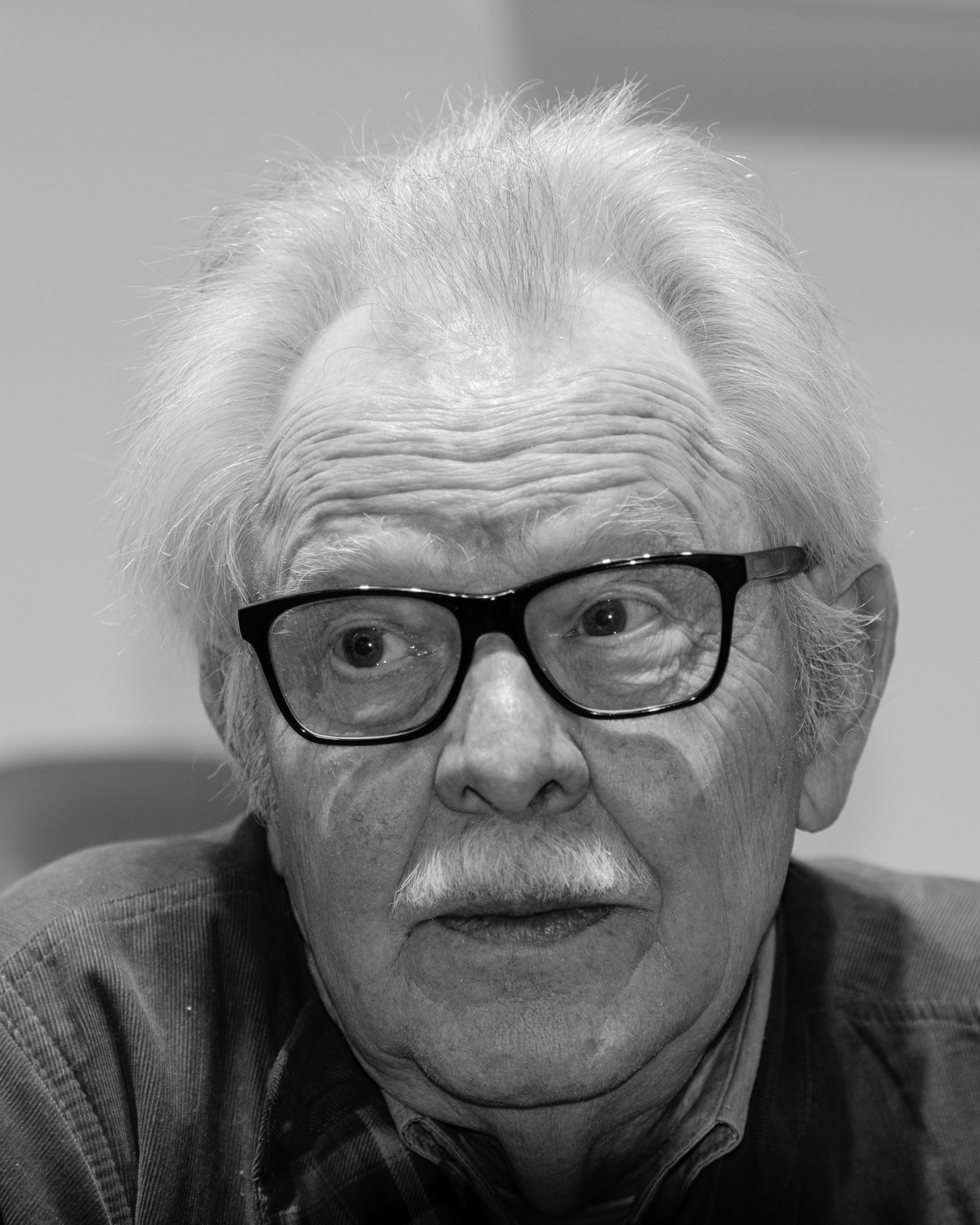
Gunnar Harding.

- 22 January – Tobias Berggren, poet.
- 12 May – Lill Lindfors, Finnish-Swedish singer
- 11 June – Gunnar Harding, poet.
- 18 October – Carl von Essen, fencer.
- 12 October – Gösta Pettersson, cyclist

== Deaths ==
- 10 March – Agnes von Krusenstjerna, writer (born 1894)
- 16 March – Selma Lagerlöf, writer (born 1858)
- 24 November – Janne Lundblad, horse rider (born 1877).
- 12 October – Ann-Margret Holmgren, feminist and pacifist writer (born 1850)
