= Haga Echo Temple =

Coordinates: 59°21′46″N 18°02′29″E

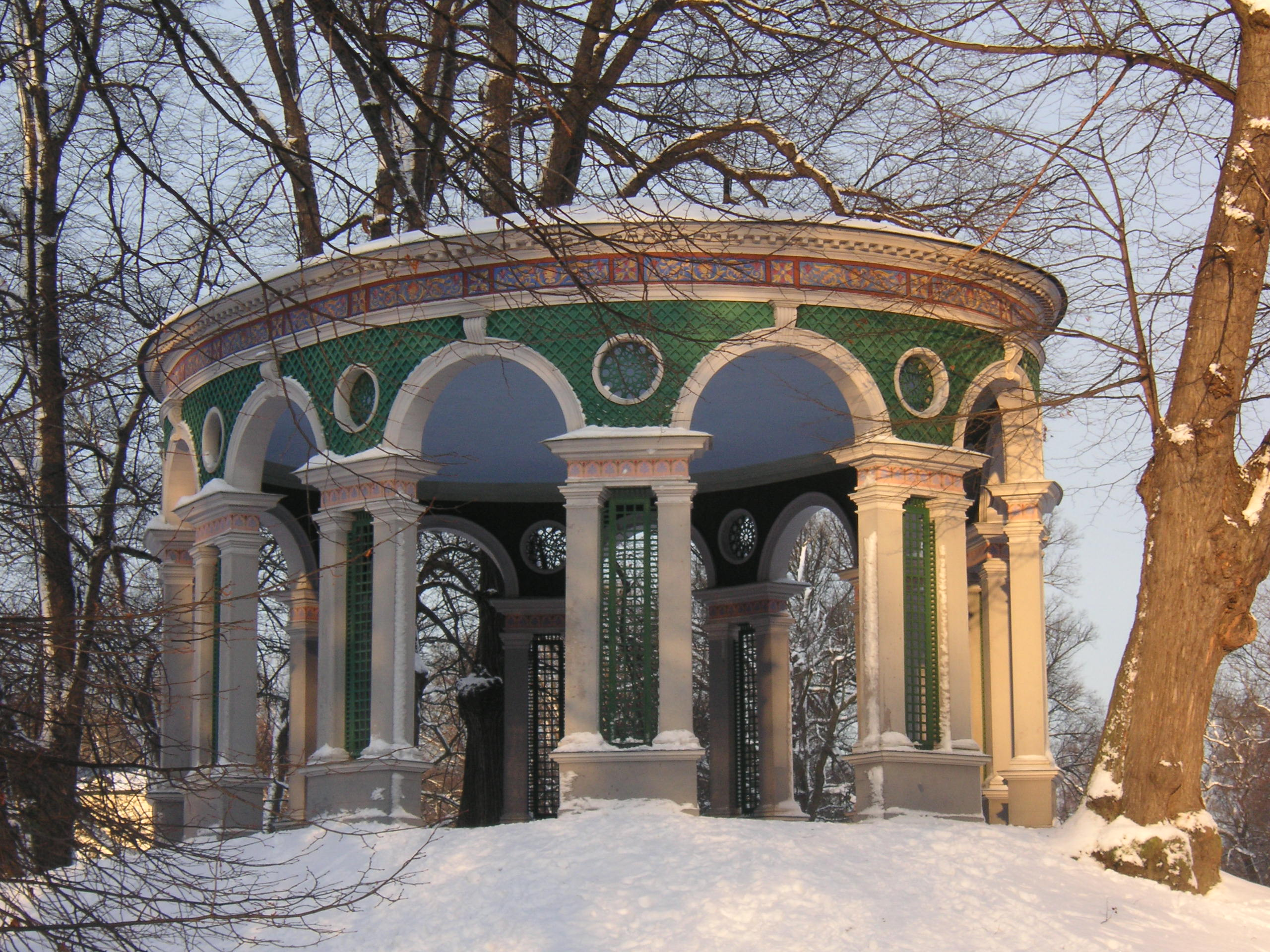
The Echo Temple

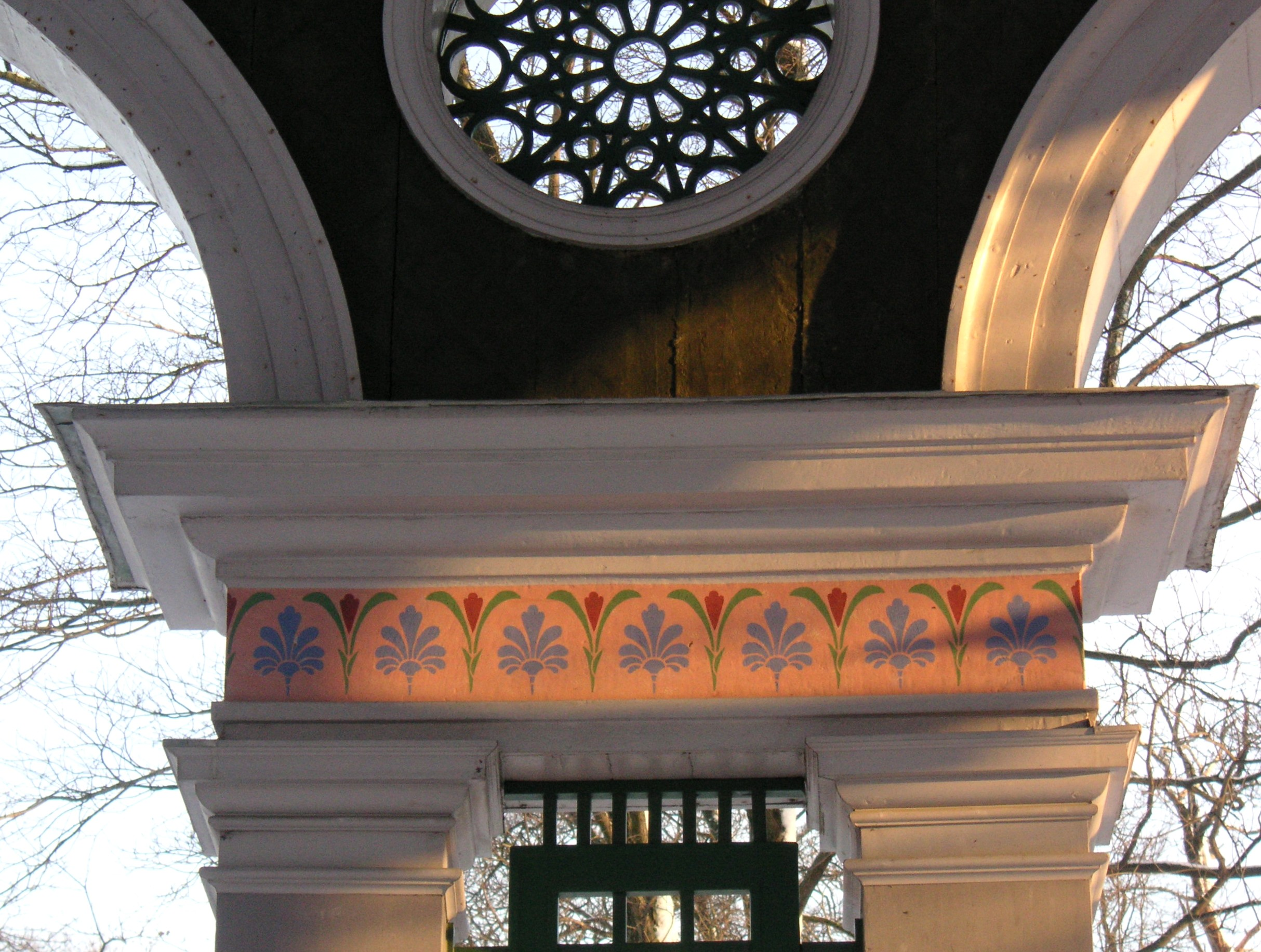
The Echo Temple, Columndetail

The Haga Echo Temple (Swedish: Ekotemplet) was built in 1790 as a summer dining room for Gustav III who loved to dine outdoors. It is situated in Hagaparken in Solna just north of Stockholm. The architect was Carl Christoffer Gjörwell.
