= Jessica Iwanson =

Swedish dancer and choreographer

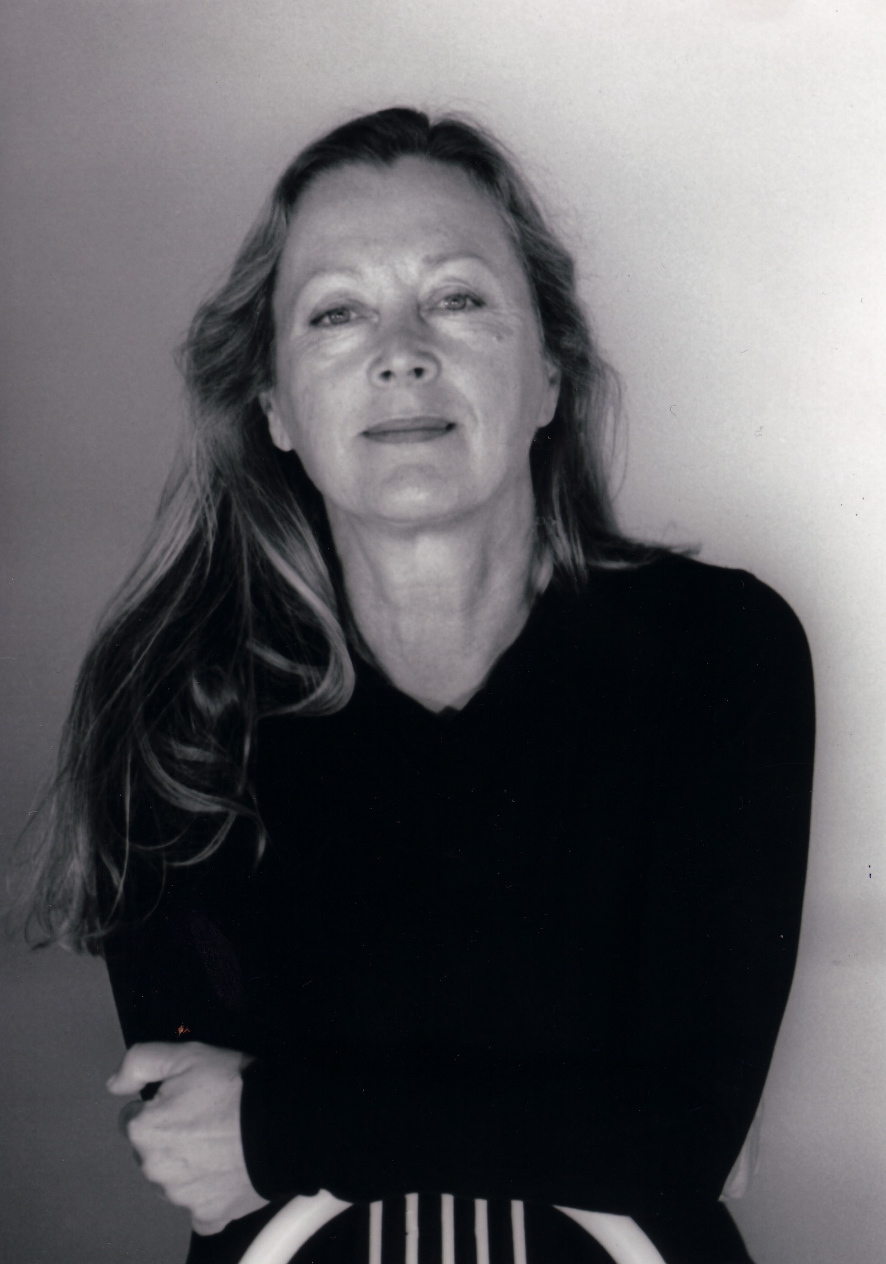

Jessica Iwanson (born 21 April 1948 in Stockholm, Sweden) is a choreographer and artistic director of Iwanson International School of Contemporary Dance in Munich, Germany.

Since 1974, Jessica Iwanson has lived in Munich, where for more than 30 years she strongly influenced the history of contemporary dance. 2001, she was awarded the medal 'München leuchtet' by the City of Munich for her lifework. Jessica Iwanson is one of the founders of the Choreographic Association of Munich (1987) and the Bavarian Association of Contemporary Dance (1997).

Iwanson was brought up in Stockholm, Sweden where she studied at the Stockholm Ballet Academy and met teachers/choreographers like Birgit Cullberg, Kathrine Dunham, Walter Nicks, Warren Spears, and Alvin Ailey. 1966/67 she spent 1 year studying at the Martha Graham School in New York where she, among other company dancers, still had Martha Graham personally as a teacher. Further studies at the Alvin Ailey School brought her to teachers like Denise Jefferson and Milton Meyers.

Besides the work with her own company, Iwanson choreographed at numerous state theatres in Scandinavia, was artistic director at 'Riksteatern' in Sweden and director at 'Carte Blanche' the contemporary dance company of Norway (91/92). Best known internationally is her TV-dance-drama 'Nightbirds' (1997), influenced by paintings of Edward Hopper and broadcast in a great number of countries.

In 2007 Iwanson, together with her husband Stefan Sixt, started Germany's first foundation for contemporary dance, 'Iwanson-Sixt-Stiftung zeitgenössischer Tanz'. Among others, Ismael Ivo, artistic director of the dance section of the Biennale Venice, is a member of the board. The foundation offers rehearsal space for young choreographers and once a year awards the 'Isadora-Prize' to personalities for their merits within contemporary dance.
