= 1937 in Sweden =

- Decades: 1910s; 1920s; 1930s; 1940s; 1950s
- See also: Other events of 1937; Timeline of Swedish history

Events from 1937 in Sweden.

== Incumbents ==
- Monarch – Gustaf V
- Prime Minister – Per Albin Hansson

== Events ==
- Founding of Saab AB
- Founding of AB Nyköpings Automobilfabrik
- Founding of Kommittén för ökad kvinnorepresentation.

== Births ==
- July 7 - Lars-Erik Larsson, Olympic rower
- September 20 – Monica Zetterlund, singer and actress (d. 2005)

== Deaths ==
- June 3 - Hugo Hammarskjöld, public servant and politician (b. 1845)
- July 7 – Åke Hammarskjöld, diplomat and lawyer (b. 1893)
- December 9 – Gustaf Dalén, physicist, Nobel Prize laureate (b. 1869)
