= 1942 in Sweden =

- Decades: 1920s; 1930s; 1940s; 1950s; 1960s
- See also: Other events of 1942; Timeline of Swedish history

Events from the year 1942 in Sweden

== Incumbents ==
- Monarch – Gustaf V
- Prime Minister – Per Albin Hansson

== Events ==
- April 24 – Hot water is allowed three days a week in Swedish apartment buildings, in Stockholm this requires an extra 12,000 cubic meters of firewood
- RIFA (manufacturer) is founded.
- August 7 – Sven "Svängis" Johansson, Sweden wins the Six-Day Cycle Race in Sweden
- September - sweden place explosion mine in baltic sea shipping route to defend the ship from Soviet and german

== Births ==
- 2 January – Thomas Hammarberg, diplomat and human rights defender
- 14 January – Stig Engström (actor)
- 17 May – Tom Turesson, footballer and manager (died 2004)
- 22 June – Laila Freivalds, Social Democratic politician
- 3 July – Gunilla Bergström, author, journalist, and illustrator (died 2021)
- 4 July – Arne Hegerfors, sports journalist and broadcaster (died 2024)
- 12 July – Leif "Loket" Olsson, broadcaster (died 2025)
- 25 July – Krister Kristensson, footballer and manager (died 2023)
- 1 August – Kent Andersson, motorcycle racer (died 2006)
- 27 August – Örjan Persson, footballer
- 30 September – Sture Pettersson, cyclist (died 1983)
- 6 October – Britt Ekland, actress
- 6 October – Björn Nordqvist, footballer
- 26 December – Jan Halvarsson, cross-country skier (died 2020)

== Deaths ==
- 25 January - Gertrud Adelborg, women's rights activist
- 5 July – Karin Swanström, actress, producer and director
- 26 June - Agda Östlund, suffragist and social democrat
- 20 November – Emma Meissner, soprano and actress
- 21 November – Einar Lönnberg, zoologist and conservationist
- 3 December – Wilhelm Peterson-Berger, composer
