= Leif Axmyr =

Swedish murderer

- Born: Leif Bruno Axmyr; 11 June 1938; Gothenburg, Sweden
- Died: 11 October 2018 (aged 80); Halmstad, Sweden
- Criminal charge: Murder (x2)
- Criminal penalty: Life imprisonment
- Criminal status: Released 2 June 2016, died in 2018

Leif Bruno Axmyr (11 June 1938 – 11 October 2018) was a Swedish convicted murderer. At the time of his release in 2016, he had been imprisoned longer than any other Swedish inmate who had served a life sentence. In May 1982, Axmyr was on leave from prison when he killed his ex-girlfriend and her male friend. He was sentenced to life imprisonment for the double murder and other offences. In 1997, the newspaper Svenska Dagbladet stated that Axmyr was Sweden's longest-serving prisoner in a Swedish prison. Örebro district court commuted his life sentence to 51 years in 2013; he was released on 2 June 2016 after serving 34 years in prison (two-thirds of his sentence).

== Early life ==
In a radio documentary in 2008, Axmyr said that he was an illegitimate child and spent his first seven years in a child care home. First he lived at a child care home called Kustens, then Ekedalen, and, later, Vidkärr. Axmyr stated that conditions were rough in the child care homes—abuse, such as beatings, occurred regularly.

== First crimes ==
He started committing violent offences at an early age; at seventeen he beat up his stepfather and said that he enjoyed it and would have beaten him to death if his friends had not stepped in. Axmyr was first sentenced to prison for robbery in 1958 and spent, with short interruptions, almost fifty years in Swedish prisons. Axmyr considered himself a leader within the prison system and incurred many infractions for violence and unlawful threats. While imprisoned, he received separate mental evaluations in 1963 and 1982; both times doctors concluded that he had a personality disorder and psychopathic personality traits. Doctors also stated that he had an inability to control his anxiety and had impulse control problems.

== Murders ==
Axmyr was about to be released in 1982, after serving the initial 1958 sentence for robbery plus additional time for violent offences within prison, when he was allowed leave. On 29 May 1982, during his leave, Axmyr beat his ex-girlfriend Ulla-Britt Jakobsson and her male friend Hans Larsson to death at Jakobsson's apartment. At the time of the murders, Axmyr was not aware that Hans was the son of politician Allan Larsson (later Sweden's finance minister). Before leaving, he lit fires in three different places in the apartment. Axmyr was arrested shortly after in Skutskär. He was later sentenced to life imprisonment for double murder and several related crimes, including arson. A mental evaluation determined that Axmyr was not insane. At the trial Axmyr confessed that he used a crowbar during the crime. The court concluded that Axmyr murdered both persons with complete disregard for human life and that the victims had suffered before dying.

== Parole applications ==
Axmyr was denied clemency eleven times between 1999 and 2001.

In November 2006, Axmyr applied to have his life term commuted to a time-limited sentence. He application was denied in November 2007. He was again denied on 23 May 2008 and Axmyr appealed to the Göta Court of Appeal, which also denied the application on 28 November 2008. In November 2009, he again applied to have his sentence commuted. Axmyr's application was denied because he continued to commit crimes within prison, joined the criminal group Brödraskapet, beat up other prisoners, and threatened journalists from the newspaper Expressen.

On 7 May 2010, Örebro district court announced that Axmyr's application to have his sentence commuted to a time-limited sentence would be approved and that he would be released in 2013. A time limit of 46 years and six months was set. The Göta Court of Appeal later overturned the district court ruling. Axmyr then appealed to the High Court. On 17 March 2011, the High Court refused to hear the case.

Because he consistently violated rules, Axmyr had all of his approved leave days withdrawn in 2006. In 2013, his approved leave days from prison were reinstated.

On 10 June 2013, Örebro district court again decided that Axmyr's sentence would be commuted. He was released in June 2016 after serving 34 years in prison. While the court considered that there was a danger that he would reoffend and that his personality disorder and psychopathy were problematic, they decided that Axmyr's failing health and old age mitigated the risk.

== Release and death ==
Axmyr was released on 2 June 2016, at the age of 78. He died two years later on 11 October 2018, at the age of 80.
