= 1936 in Sweden =

- Decades: 1910s; 1920s; 1930s; 1940s; 1950s
- See also: Other events of 1936; Timeline of Swedish history

Events from the year 1936 in Sweden

== Incumbents ==
- Monarch – Gustaf V
- Prime Minister – Per Albin Hansson, Axel Pehrsson-Bramstorp

== Events ==
- In October of this year, the Mästermyr chest is accidentally discovered in the Mästermyr mire (after which it is later named), west of Hemse on the island of Gotland, Sweden. It will prove to be the largest tool find from that era in Europe.

== Popular culture ==
=== Literature ===
- Katrina, novel by Sally Salminen

=== Film ===
- 23 March – The comedy film Kungen kommer released in Sweden.

=== Sports ===
- World All-Round Speed Skating Championships for Women held in Stockholm
- Svenska Badmintonförbundet established
- The 1936 Swedish Ice Hockey Championship was won by Hammarby IF

== Births ==
- 17 May – Lars Gustafsson, poet, novelist and scholar
- 22 July – John Albrechtson, sailor (died 1985).

== Deaths ==
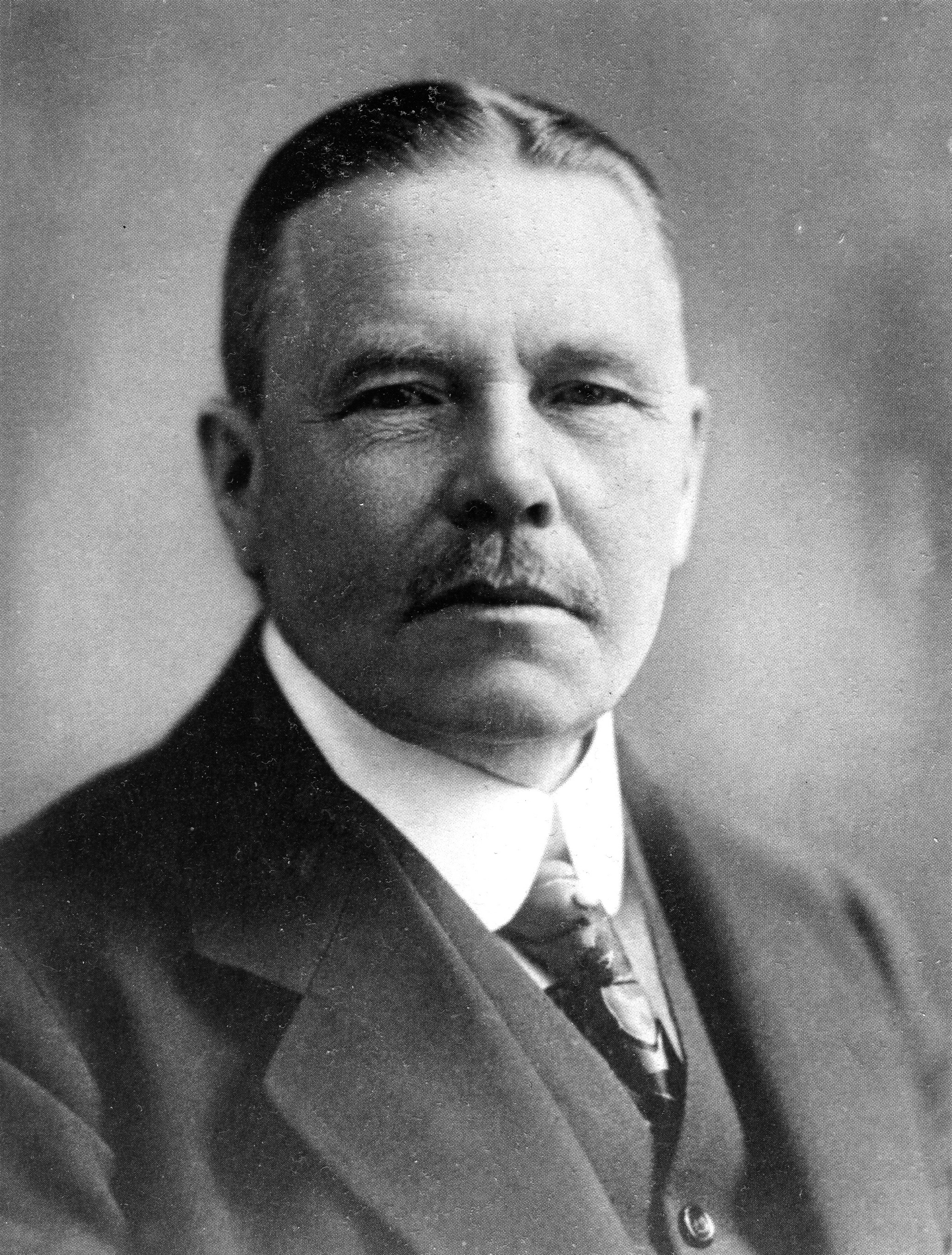
Arvid Lindman, 12th Prime Minister of Sweden.

- 8 February – Elma Danielsson, Social Democrat, journalist and feminist (born 1865)
- 13 March – Gunnar Höjer, gymnast (born 1875).
- 31 August – Gustav Almgren, fencer (born 1906).
- 9 December – Arvid Lindman, rear admiral, industrialist and conservative politician (born 1862)

=== Exact date missing ===
- Sven Scholander, singer, musician, composer and sculptor (born 1860)
- Sigrid Björkegren, entrepreneur (born 1845)
