= 1947 in Sweden =

- Decades: 1920s; 1930s; 1940s; 1950s; 1960s
- See also: Other events of 1947; Timeline of Swedish history

Historical event from the year 1947 in Sweden

== Incumbents ==
- Monarch – Gustaf V
- Prime Minister – Tage Erlander

== Events ==
- On 26 January Prince Gustaf Adolf, Duke of Vasterbotten (second-in-line to the throne) was killed in a plane crash in Copenhagen, Denmark.
- Karin Kock-Lindberg becomes the first female government minister.

== Births ==
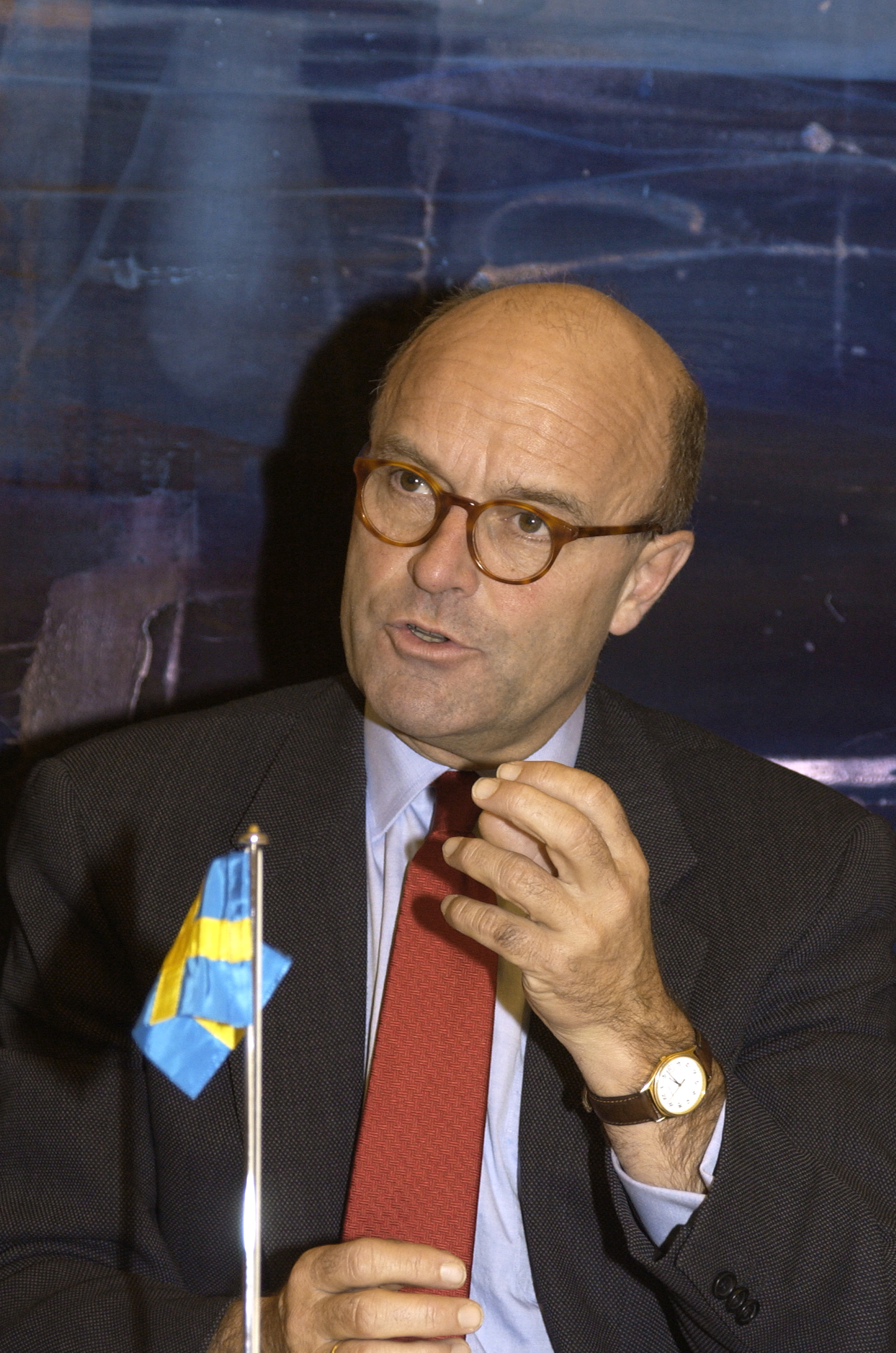
Gunnar Lund

- 27 January – Björn Afzelius, singer, songwriter and guitarist (Hoola Bandoola Band) (died 1999)
- 1 February – Clark Olofsson, criminal (died 2025)
- 19 February – Ingvar Hansson, sailor.
- 17 March – Hans Jacobson, fencer, Olympic champion from 1976 (died 1984).
- 20 April – Björn Skifs, singer and songwriter
- 26 July – Gunnar Lund, diplomat and politician.
- 5 September – Tommy Limby, cross-country skier (died 2008).
- 30 October – Sven Melander, journalist and television presenter.(died 2022)

== Deaths ==
- 26 January – Gustaf Adolf, prince of Sweden (born 1906)
- 14 February – Mauritz Eriksson, sport shooter, Olympic champion from 1912 (born 1888).
- 10 August – Elisabet Anrep-Nordin, pedagogue (born 1857)
- 6 December – Henric Horn af Åminne, horse rider (born 1880)
