= 1941 in Sweden =

- Decades: 1920s; 1930s; 1940s; 1950s; 1960s
- See also: Other events of 1941; Timeline of Swedish history

Events from the year 1941 in Sweden

== Incumbents ==
- King – Gustaf V
- Prime Minister – Per Albin Hansson
- Cabinet –
  - Minister for Justice – Karl Gustaf Westman
  - Minister for Foreign Affairs – Christian Günther
  - Minister for Foreign Trade –
    - Fritiof Domö (until 7 March)
    - Hermann Eriksson (after 7 March)
  - Minister for Defence – Per Edvin Sköld
  - Minister for Health and Social Affairs – Gustav Möller
  - Minister for Finance – Ernst Wigforss
  - Minister for Rural Affairs – Axel Pehrsson-Bramstorp
  - Minister for Infrastructure – Gustaf Andersson

== Events ==
- Enskilda Bank receives $4.5M from Germany & allegedly acts as a purchasing agent for German bonds and securities.
- 20 January - The first trolleybus line in Stockholm begins to operate.
- 22 January - Victor Hasselblad registers the Hasselblad Camera Company
- 4 March - British commandos carry out attacks on Narvik, Norway via Sweden
- 22 June - The Midsummer crisis begins following Germany's request to transport troops through Sweden during Operation Barbarossa. Historians later debated whether the episode constituted a genuine constitutional crisis.
- 25 June - 163rd Infantry Division (Wehrmacht) starts to travel through Sweden.
- July - A fully-equipped German division crosses Sweden from Norway to Finland.
- 17 September - Swedish navy experiences its worst disaster ever in Harsfjarden

== Births ==
- 3 February - Monica Nordquist, actress (died 2017)
- 13 February - Bo Svenson, actor
- 28 April - Ann-Margret, actress
- 15 June - Essy Persson, actress
- 19 June - Magnus Harenstram, actor
- 9 July - Hans-Gunnar Liljenwall, modern pentathlete
- 13 September - Jan-Åke Edvinsson, ice hockey administrator (died 2022)
- 29 September - Thomas Hellberg, actor (died 2023)

== Deaths ==
- 3 January - Henning Ohlson, playwright and screenwriter (b. 1884)
- 8 April – Gulli Petrini, women's rights activist (b. 1867)
- 3 May – Selma Ek, operatic soprano (b. 1856)
- 15 May – Anna Lindhagen, politician (b. 1870)

== See also ==
- Timeline of Sweden during World War II
- History of Sweden
