= 1939 in Sweden =

- Decades: 1910s; 1920s; 1930s; 1940s; 1950s
- See also: Other events of 1939; Timeline of Swedish history

Events from the year 1939 in Sweden

== Incumbents ==
- Monarch – Gustaf V
- Prime Minister – Per Albin Hansson

== Events ==
- 31 August – The Sandö Bridge collapsed while under construction, and 18 workers were killed in the event.
- The secret intelligence agency C-byrån established.
- The Åhlinska skolan is closed.

== Literature ==
- Pelle Svanslös på äventyr by Gösta Knutsson, the first book in the Pelle Svanslös children's book series

== Births ==
- 15 January – Per Ahlmark, writer and politician
- 25 January - Gabriel Romanus, politician
- 21 February - Börje Ahlstedt, actor
- 30 June - Anna-Greta Leijon, politician (d. 2024)
- 28 July – Gösta Ekman, actor, comedian, and director
- 2 September - Ivar Jacobson, computer scientist and software engineer

== Deaths ==
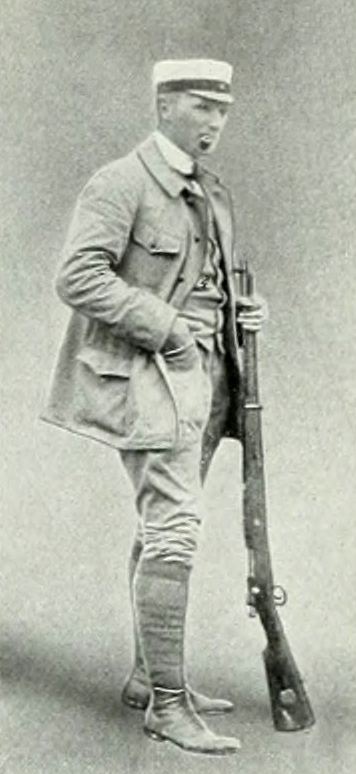
Åke Lundeberg, won two gold and one silver medals at the 1912 Summer Olympics.

- 12 January – Hugo Jahnke, gymnast (born 1886).
- 16 May – Anders Lindstedt mathematician, astronomer and actuarial scientist, known for the Poincaré–Lindstedt method (born 1854)
- 29 May – Åke Lundeberg, sport shooter (born 1888).
- 18 December – Bruno Liljefors, painter (born 1860)

=== Full date missing ===
- Olof Olsson, politician (born 1872).
