= Augusta Andersson =

Swedish businessperson

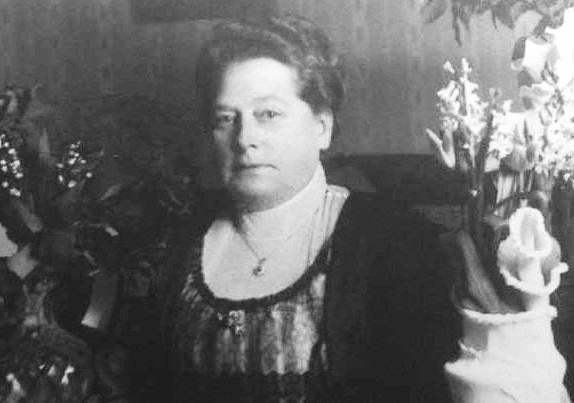
Augusta Andersson in 1937

Augusta Andersson (1856–1938) was a Swedish businessperson.

Known as "Pretty Augusta", she was from 1876 employed, from 1894 the manager and from 1901 to 1931 the owner of Restaurant 55:an ('Restaurant Number 55'); originally a pastry coffee house, she developed it into a well-known restaurant known for its high standards and for being the locality of the arts club Kägelklubben Klothilda, which famously included Anders Zorn.
