= Cecilia Milow =

Swedish author, translator, educator, campaigner and suffragette

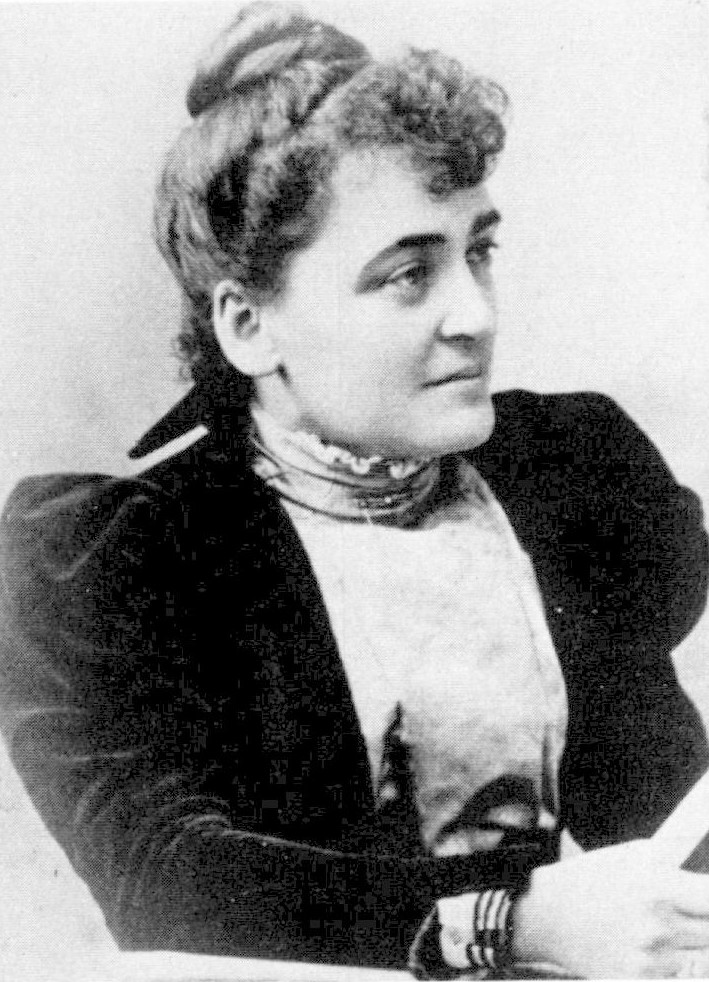
- Born: Emma Cecilia Milow; 8 March 1856; Gothenburg, Sweden
- Died: 7 May 1946 (aged 90); Stockholm, Sweden
- Occupations: Educator, author, social activist, suffragist

Cecilia Milow (8 March 1856 – 7 May 1946), was a Swedish author, translator, educator, campaigner and suffragette.

== Early life and education ==
Born in Gothenburg as Emma Cecilia Milow, but known as Cecilia ('Cissy' to her intimate circle), she was the youngest of three daughters born to Johan Fredrik Milow (born 1814) and Mary Lindgren (1825–1906). Her London-born Anglo-Swedish mother was a translator, author and pedagogue. Her musical eldest sister, Thekla Milow (born 1848, London), was the wife of Baron Sten Miles Sture (1806–1875), the last of his historic dynastic line.

Milow was originally devoted to education, founding a girls' school in Skövde 1887–1902 with the patronage of the wealthy philanthropist Consul Oscar Ekman (1812–1907). He also urged her to pursue further studies in England and Germany. Already an English Language teacher, she was first able to graduate in history at London, in 1894, then in both language and literature from the George J. Burch School of English at Oxford, in 1898.

Between 1902 and 1911, Ekman sponsored Milow to take further prolonged periods of study leave. She first returned to England, where she concentrated on childcare and the social problems of industrial towns and cities. She then continued to America, where she pursued her study of philanthropic and social work, visiting various social clubs and working class districts in a number of states. She was particularly fascinated by two boys' clubs, one founded by a wealthy business man named Cornelius Loder in New York, and another set up by a Scot named Thomas Chew, at the industrial town of Fall River, an hour's journey from Boston.

== Work ==
Upon return to Sweden, Milow dedicated her life to social work, founding and directing the pioneering Kungsholmens Youth Club in Stockholm from 1904 to 1922. She was also a founder of the Swedish People's Association in 1906, a political propaganda organisation. She was also a member of the board of the Central Committee and a member of the working committee of an organisation called Svensk Folkviljan, or the Swedish People's Will, avidly campaigning for women's rights and suffrage. Between 1922 and 1930, she held the post of editor for Sweden's civic-spirited Women's Organisation journal and published papers on defence, children and youth.

On several occasions, Milow was invited to Stronvar House, the baronial pile of James Carnegie on the shore of Loch Voil in the Braes O'Balquhidder, Perthshire, Scotland. It was on one of these visits that Milow first met General Robert Baden-Powell, an introduction which would lead to her founding Sweden's first Boy Scout troop, one of the first in the world.

In 1916, King Gustav VI awarded Milow the Illis quorum in recognition of her contribution to Swedish culture and social work. In 1928, L. Wahlström published a study of her work with disadvantaged boys, entitled Cecilia Milow och hennes Kungsholmspojkar ['Cecilia Milow and her Kungsholm Boys'].

Cecilia Milow died on 7 May 1946 in Stockholm, and is buried with her mother at Saint Elin cemetery in Skövde.

Milow was a cousin of British author and charity-founder David Charles Manners.

== Sources ==
- Ann-Cathrine Haglund, Ann-Marie Petersson, Inger Ström-Billing (2004). Moderata pionjärer: kvinnor i politiskt arbete 1900–2000 (in Swedish). Stockholm: Sällskapet för moderata kvinnors historia. ISBN 91-631-5862-0.
- Cecilia Milow, 1856–1946 by Ann-Marie Petersson
- Svensk uppslagsbok 18. Malmö 1934
