= 2021 in Sweden =

- Decades: 2000s; 2010s; 2020s
- See also: Other events of 2021; Timeline of Swedish history

Events in the year 2021 in Sweden.

== Incumbents ==
- Monarch – Carl XVI Gustaf
- Prime minister – Stefan Löfven, Magdalena Andersson

== Events ==
Ongoing — COVID-19 pandemic in Sweden

- 31 January – Sweden loses to Denmark in the final of the 2021 World Men's Handball Championship, winning silver in the competition.
- 3 March – Vetlanda stabbing attack: A man in his twenties injures 7 people with an axe in Vetlanda. He was shot and wounded by police before being arrested.
- 22–28 March – 2021 World Figure Skating Championships were held in Stockholm.
- 1 April – Kalix train station is opened.
- 21 June – Swedish government crisis.
- 29 June – Sweden men's national football team are knocked out of the UEFA Euro 2020 competition at the Round of 16 by Ukraine.
- 8 July – A single-engine DHC-2 Beaver carrying 8 skydivers plus 1 pilot crashed shortly after takeoff from Örebro Airport. All 9 people died.
- 19 August – Eslöv school stabbing: One man is injured in a school attack in Eslöv.
- 22 August – Stefan Löfven announces that he will resign as Prime Minister in November 2021.
- 28 September – An explosion occurs in Annedal in Gothenburg.
- 3 October – Lars Vilks dies together with two guards in a car crash on European route E4 in Markaryd.
- 14 October – The Swedish Police Authority presents a new list of Vulnerable areas, Klockaretorpet in Norrköping and Rannebergen in Gothenburg are removed while Valsta, Fisksätra, Visättra and Grantorp in Stockholm are added.
- 30 November: Magdalena Andersson replaces Stefan Löfven as Prime Minister of Sweden, making her the first woman ever to hold that position.
- 27 November to 5 December – 2021 Women's World Floorball Championships in Uppsala.
- 6 December – A photo published by Nyheter Idag of the Minister for Public Administration Ida Karkiainen doing a Nazi salute in 2004 becomes a political scandal.
- 13 December – Two vessels collide of the coast of Ystad.

== Anniversaries ==
- 400 years since the establishment of Gothenburg as a city, getting town privileges in 1621. The planned Gothenburg quadricentennial jubilee has been postponed till 2023, due to the ongoing COVID-19 pandemic.

== Births ==
- 26 March - Prince Julian, Duke of Halland

== Deaths ==
=== January ===
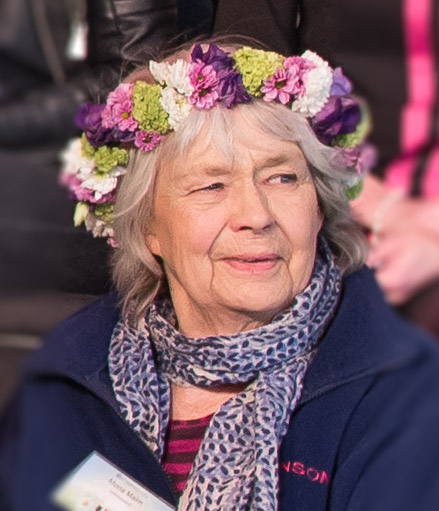
Mona Malm

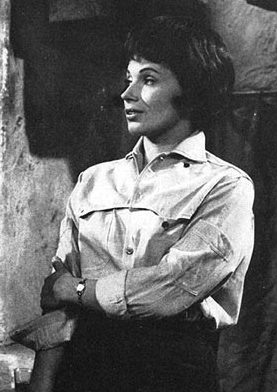
Gunnel Lindblom

- 10 January – Thorleif Torstensson, singer (b. 1949).
- 11 January – Tord Peterson, actor (b. 1926).
- 12 January – Mona Malm, actress (b. 1935).
- 16 January – Lars Westman, writer (b. 1934).
- 18 January – Thorsten Johansson, Olympic sprinter (b. 1950).
- 21 January
  - Evert Båge, military officer (b. 1925).
  - Solveig Nordström, archeologist (b. 1923).
- 24 January
  - Gunnel Lindblom, actress (b. 1931).
  - Sigvard Marjasin, civil servant (b. 1929).
- 26 January – Lars Norén, playwright, novelist and poet (b. 1944).
- 27 January – Gert Blomé, ice hockey player (b. 1934).
- 28 January – Annette Kullenberg, journalist and author (b. 1939).

=== February ===
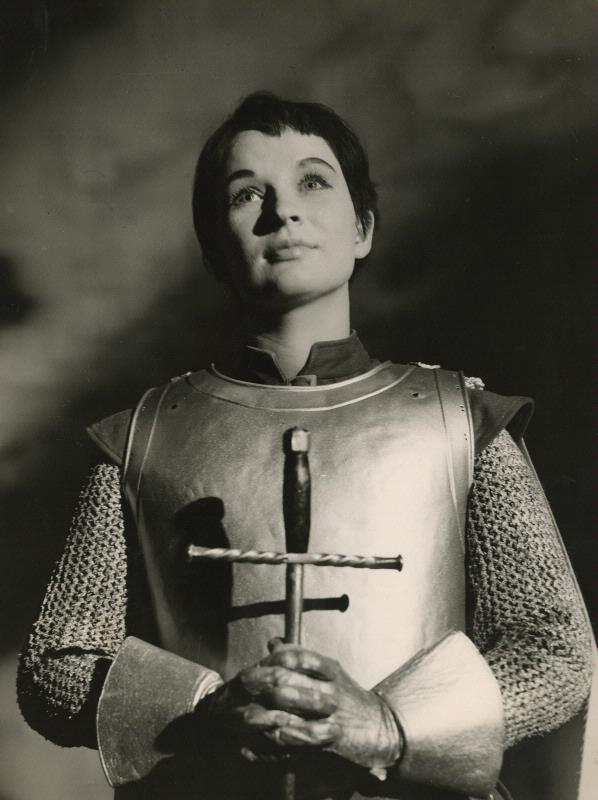
Margreth Weivers

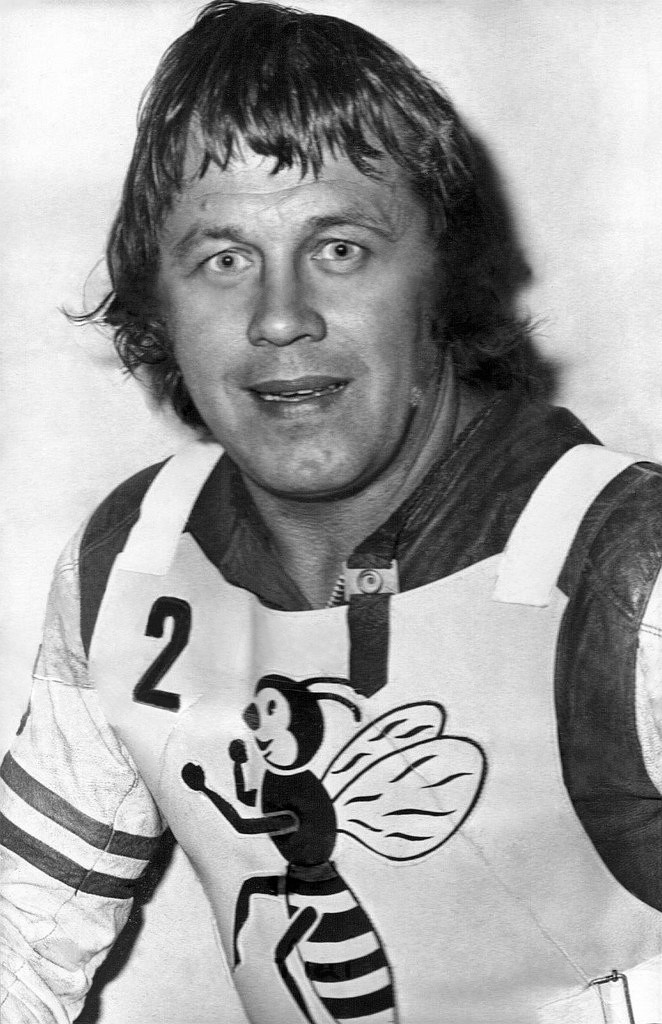
Olle Nygren

- 3 February – Margreth Weivers, actress (b. 1926).
- 4 February – Frank Baude, politician, leader of the Communist Party (b. 1936).
- 13 February – Olle Nygren, speedway rider (b. 1929).
- 19 February – Ebba Andersson, footballer (Öxabäcks, national team) (b. 1935).

=== March ===
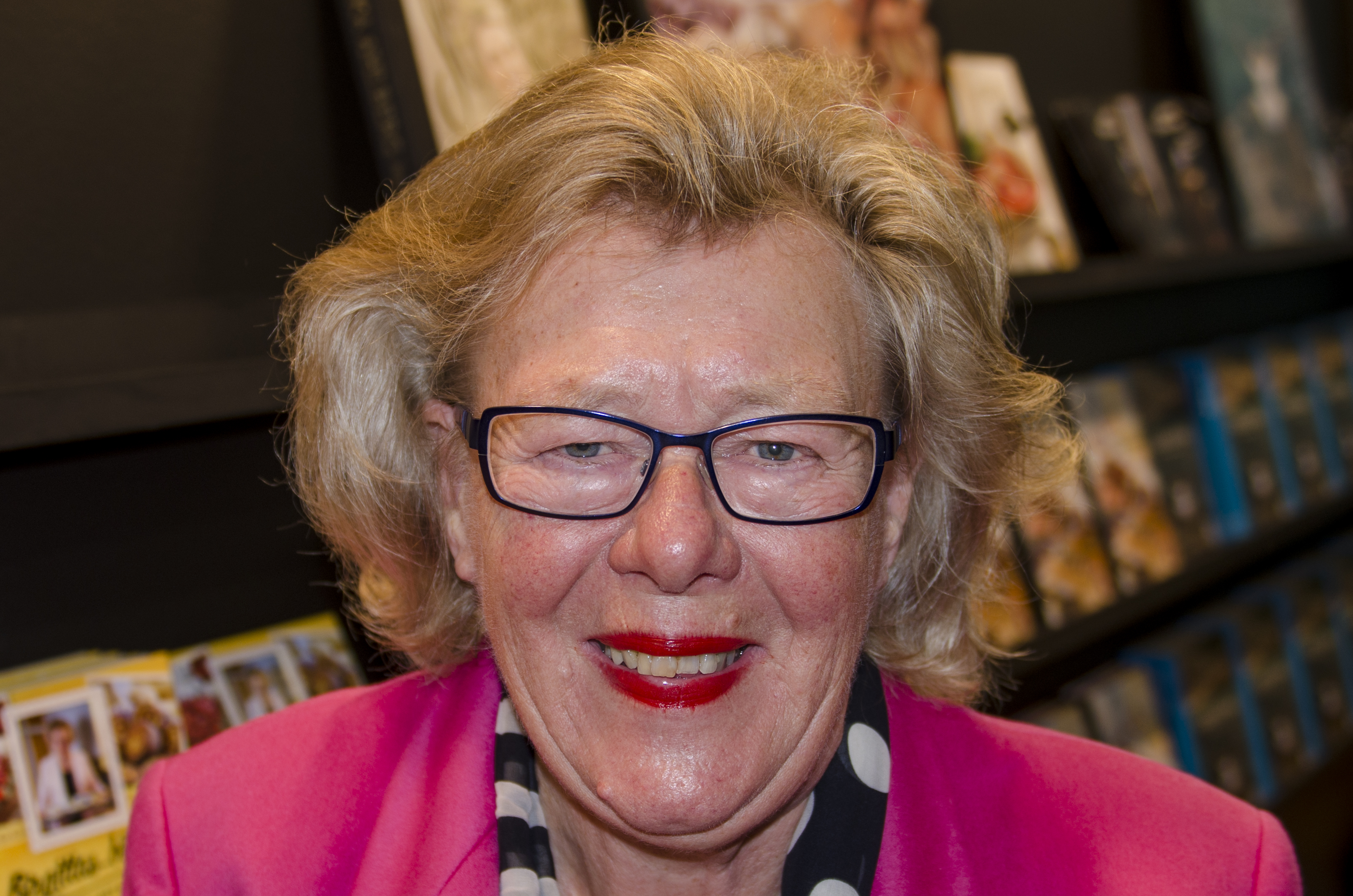
Birgitta Rasmusson

- 5 March
  - Stig Malm, trade unionist, chairman of LO (1983–1993) (b. 1942).
  - Birgitta Rasmusson, television personality and cookbook author (b. 1939).
- 6 March – Bengt Åberg, motocross racer (b. 1944).
- 7 March – Lars-Göran Petrov, heavy metal singer (Entombed, Entombed A.D., Firespawn) (b. 1972).
- 15 March – Ehrling Wahlgren, weightlifter and reality television contestant (Expedition Robinson) (b. 1946).
- 16 March – Berit Carlberg, stage actress (Nine) (b. 1942).
- 26 March – Lennart Larsson, cross country skier, Olympic bronze medalist (1956) (b. 1930).
- 28 March
  - Uffe Bergstrand, singer and musician (b. 1981).
  - Ingmar Glanzelius, musician, music writer and playwright (b.1927).

=== April ===
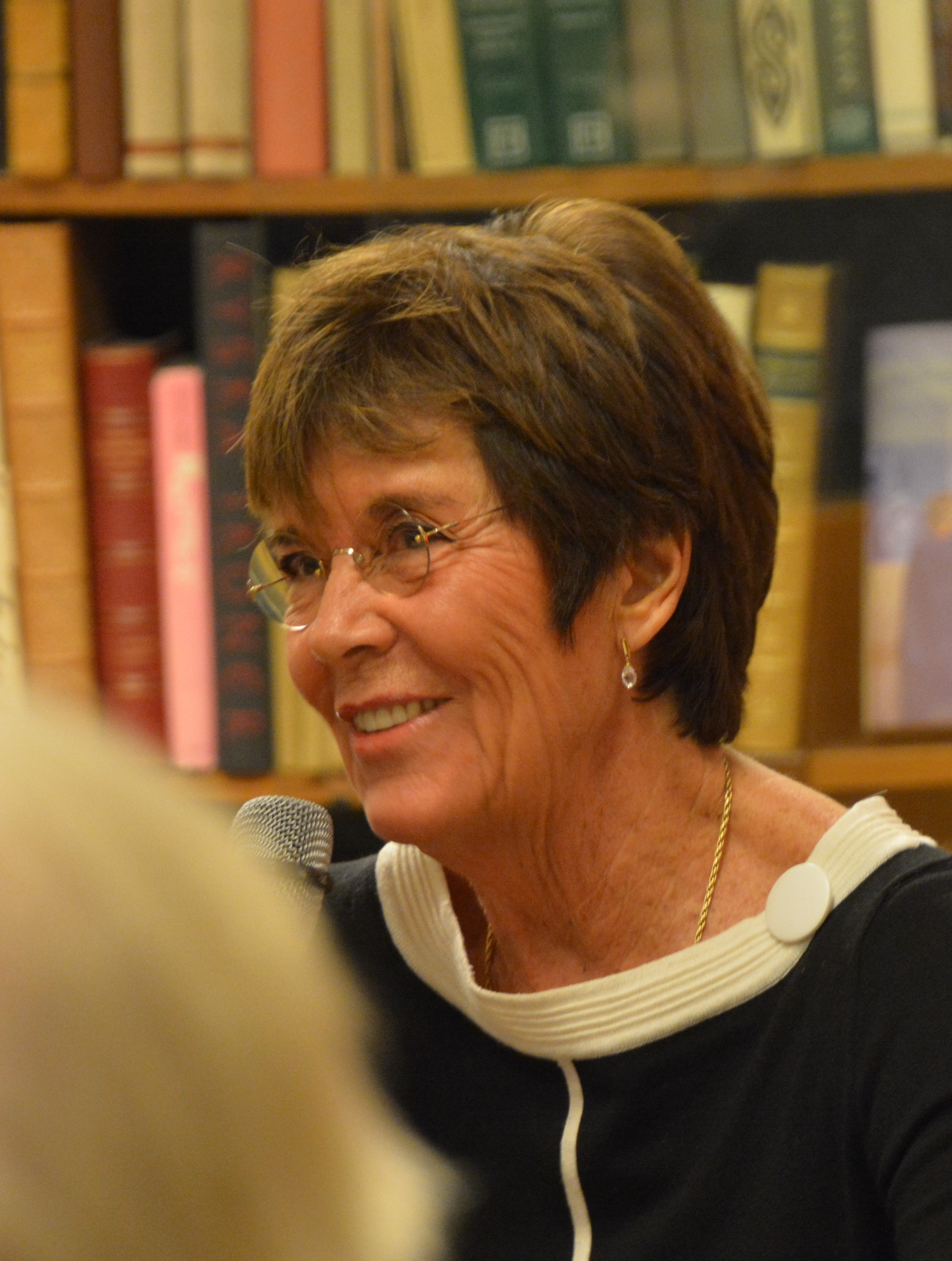
Ingela Lind

- 1 April – Nemam Ghafouri, physician, activist and humanitarian (b. 1968).
- 4 April – Ingela Lind, art critic and author (b. 1943).
- 6 April – Maj Britt Theorin, politician, MP (1971–1995) and MEP (1995–2004) (b. 1932).
- 10 April
  - Börje Holmberg, educator and writer (b. 1924).
  - Bosse Skoglund, drummer (Peps Persson) (b. 1936).
- 11 April – Berta Magnusson, writer and playwright (b. 1928).
- 14 April
  - Sköld Peter Matthis, doctor and left-wing political activist (b. 1937).
  - Inga Sarri, actress (b. 1934).
- 20 April – Sven-Olof Olson, Air Force officer (b. 1926).
- 24 April – Riitta Vainionpää, textile artist (b. 1952).

=== May ===
- 5 May – Bertil Johansson, footballer (IFK Göteborg, national team) (b. 1935).
- 10 May
  - Lars-Gunnar Bodin, electronic musician (b. 1935).
  - Svante Thuresson, jazz musician ("Nygammal vals") (b. 1937).

=== June ===
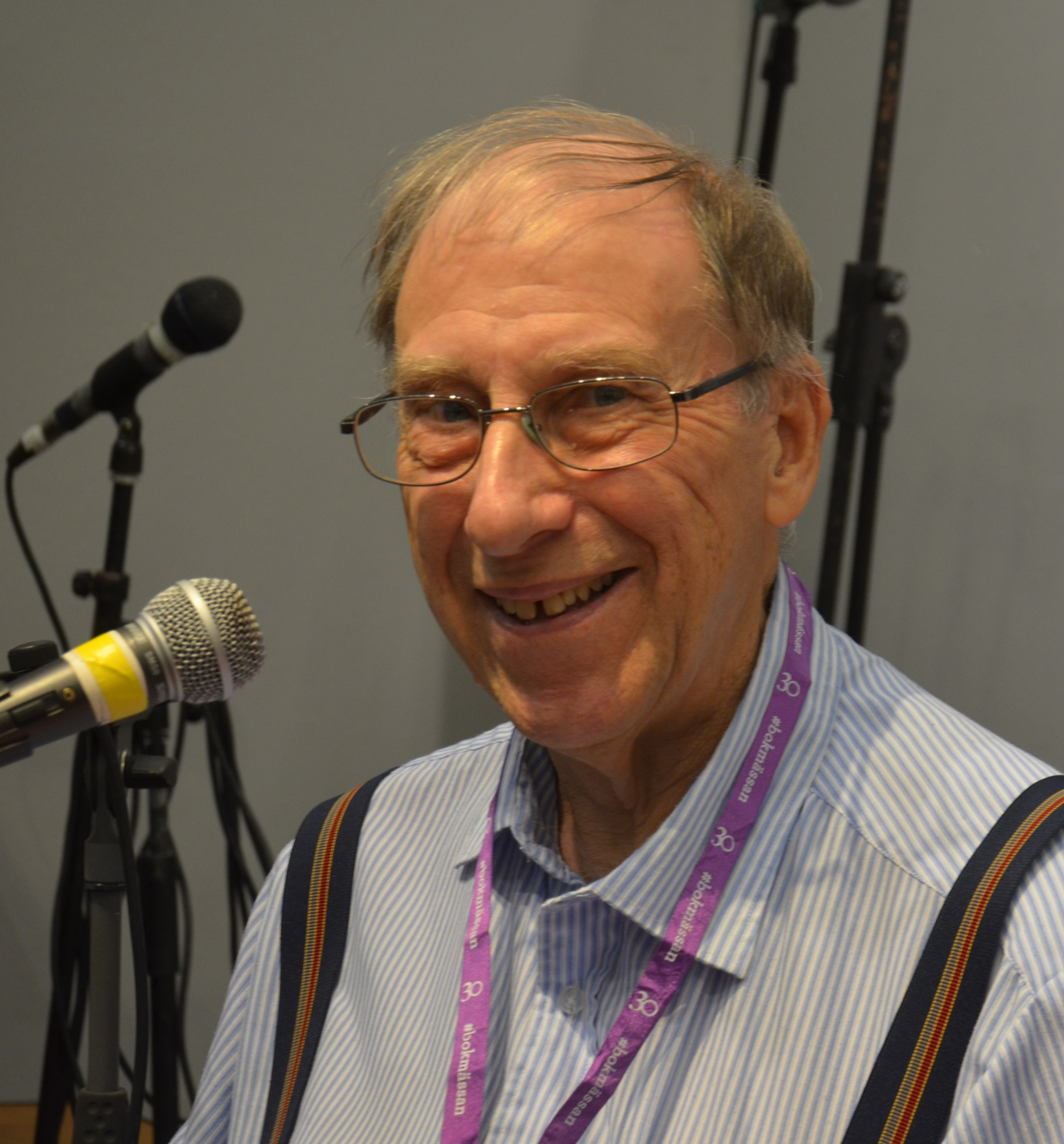
Sven Erlander

- 9 June – Torgny Björk, musician, composer and singer (b. 1938).
- 11 June – Sara Wedlund, Olympic long-distance runner (1996) (b. 1975).
- 13 June – Sven Erlander, mathematician (b. 1934).
- 16 June
  - Bengt Göransson, politician (b. 1932).
  - Anders Nunstedt, music journalist (b. 1970).
- 19 June – Ove Emanuelsson, Olympic sprint canoer (1960, 1964, 1968) (b. 1941).
- 23 June – Med Reventberg, actress (Ronia, the Robber's Daughter) (b. 1948).
- 27 June – Peps Persson, musician (b. 1946).
- 30 June – Inge Danielsson, footballer (Helsingborg, Ajax, national team) (b. 1941).

=== July ===
- 18 July – Tommy Engstrand, sports journalist and television host (b. 1939).
- 20 July
  - Curt-Eric Holmquist, conductor (Lotta på Liseberg), Eurovision Song Contest winner (1984) (b. 1948).
  - Lars Weiss, journalist and news editor (b. 1946).
- 23 July – Claes Reimerthi, comic writer (The Phantom) (b. 1955).
- 31 July – Kenneth Johansson, politician and MP (1998–2012) (b. 1956).

=== August ===
- 4 August
  - Åke Lundqvist, actor (Beck – Mannen med ikonerna) (b. 1936).
  - Anders Pettersson, musician (Lasse Stefanz) (b. 1952).
- 10 August – Gun Ädel, Olympic cross-country skier (1964) (b. 1938).
- 11 August – Göran Zachrisson, sports journalist, cancer (b. 1938).
- 25 August – Gunilla Bergström, author of Alfie Atkins (b.1942).

=== October ===
- 21 October – Einár, 19, rapper (shot)
- 27 October – Benjamin Vallé, 47, musician (Viagra Boys)

== Sports ==
- 2022 FIFA World Cup qualification – UEFA Group B
- 2021 Allsvenskan
- 2021 Superettan
