= 2022 in Sweden =

- Decades: 2000s; 2010s; 2020s
- See also: Other events of 2022; Timeline of Swedish history

Events in the year 2022 in Sweden.

The year was dominated by the Russian invasion of Ukraine. Sweden took in Ukrainian refugees fleeing the invasion of their country. Swedish government sent foreign aid to Ukraine, and condemned and sanctioned Russia for waging the war.

As the rest of Europe and in the world, Sweden continued to be affected by the COVID-19 pandemic and Deltacron hybrid variant, but much less so than in January 2020 and February 2022. The 2021–2023 inflation surge led to increased prices on many goods.

== Incumbents ==
- Monarch – Carl XVI Gustaf
- Prime minister – Magdalena Andersson (until 18 October), Ulf Kristersson (from 18 October)

== Events ==
=== January ===
- 4 January - King Carl XVI Gustaf and Queen Silvia of Sweden both test positive for Deltacron hybrid variant of COVID-19.
- 8 January - Victoria, Crown Princess of Sweden tests positive for COVID-19 for a second time, likely from Deltacron hybrid variant.
- 14 January - Operation Barkhane: Sweden announces that it will withdraw its troops from a French-led special forces mission in Mali later this year, in response to Mali's ruling military junta inviting private Russian military contractors to fight Islamist rebels. The deployment was originally expected to end in 2024.
- 16 January - Military personnel from the Swedish Armed Forces are deployed to the island of Gotland in response to fears that Russia may attempt an invasion of Swedish territory amidst tensions between NATO and Russia over their intention to invade Ukraine.
- 24 January - The daily number of COVID-19 Deltacron infections has peaked in Sweden.

=== February ===
- 1 February - Sweden lifts almost all remaining COVID-19-related restrictions except for face mask rules due to the country's high vaccination rate.
- 25 February – Sweden joined Denmark and Norway were transition to the living with COVID-19 endemic phase.
- 28 February - Swedish Prime Minister Magdalena Andersson announces that the country will send military equipment, including anti-tank launchers, to Ukraine, breaking with a doctrine of not sending arms to countries that are engaged in active conflict.

=== March ===
- 22 March - Two teachers are killed by a student during a stabbing attack at a secondary school in Malmö, Sweden. The perpetrator, an 18-year-old boy, is arrested.

=== April ===
- 15–17 April - Riots occur, several cities throughout Sweden, triggered by rallies where leader of the Danish Hard Line party Rasmus Paludan burns the Quran.

=== May ===
- 9 May - The Swedish Social Democratic Party announces that it will decide on May 15 whether to pursue a course of action to join NATO. Finnish President Sauli Niinistö is expected to also announce Finland's intention to join NATO on May 12.
- 15 May - Sweden's governing Social Democratic Party approves the country joining NATO. The official government decision is expected in the coming days.
- 16 May -
  - Prime Minister Magdalena Andersson confirms the decision her party made on Sunday and formally announces Sweden's intent to join NATO.
  - In response, Russian President Vladimir Putin warns that Russia will react to the "expansion of military infrastructure" by NATO in Sweden and Finland, saying that "problems are being created for no reason at all. We shall react accordingly".
- 18 May - Finland and Sweden both formally apply to join NATO.

=== June ===
- 2 June - Sweden announces that it will send additional military aid to Ukraine, including anti-ship missiles, anti-tank guided missiles, and rifles for the Ukrainian Ground Forces.
- 21 June - Two people are injured, including one in critical condition, after a stabbing attack in Västerås.
- 28 June – Finland, Sweden, and Turkey sign a joint memorandum on security, clearing the way for Finland and Sweden's NATO accession bids.
- 30 June – Release of Sweden's first unisex folk costume, the Bäckadräkten, designed by Fredy Clue and Ida Björs

=== July ===
- 5 July - All 30 members of NATO have signed off on the accession protocols for the membership bids of Finland and Sweden, which is subject to unanimous approval by the current members' legislative bodies.
- 7 July - Skellefteå assault case: 9-year-old girl was assaulted and left permanently disabled by a 15-year-old in Skellefteå.

=== August ===
- 19 August - A man is killed and a woman is injured in a shooting at the Emporia shopping centre in Malmö.
- 31 August - Sweden reports its first case of H5N1 bird flu in a porpoise.

=== September ===
- 11 September - The 2022 Swedish general election is held. The Sweden Democrats had seen their strongest result to date and had overtaken the Moderates to become the second largest party with 20.6% of the vote. The result was confirmed after the election.
- 29 September - 2022 Nord Stream pipeline sabotage: Swedish authorities report a fourth gas leak from the Nord Stream pipelines.

=== October ===
- 1 October - The Sweden Democrats are allocated chairmanship of four parliamentary committees for the first time in the Riksdag with party secretary Richard Jomshof appointed to head the justice committee. The party also formed a deal with Moderate leader Ulf Kristersson to provide parliamentary support to a Moderate led government.
- 13 October - Swedish right-wing parties sign an agreement to form a government led by Ulf Kristersson. The government will include the Moderate Party, the Christian Democrats, the Liberals, and will be supported by the Sweden Democrats.
- 17 October - Ulf Kristersson is appointed Prime Minister of Sweden by the Parliament of Sweden.
- 18 October - Ulf Kristersson forms the Kristersson Cabinet, as he replaces Magdalena Andersson as Prime Minister of Sweden.
- 24 October - The Swedish Museum of Wrecks announces that maritime archaeologists have discovered the wreck of the 17th-century warship Äpplet, believed to be the sister ship of Vasa, which sank off the island of Vaxholm near Stockholm in 1629.
- 30 October: Church of Sweden archbishop Antje Jackelén lays down her bishop's staff during a church service inside the Uppsala Cathedral.

=== November ===
- 18 November - Swedish authorities confirm intentional sabotage as the cause of the Nord Stream gas pipeline explosions after traces of explosives were found at the site of the leaks.

=== December ===
- 4 December: Martin Modéus replaces Antje Jackelén as Church of Sweden archbishop.

== Deaths ==
- 9 January: Per Knuts, 83, Olympic runner.
- 16 January: Sten Elliot, 96, Olympic sailor.
- 17 January: Björn Natthiko Lindeblad, 60, economist and Buddhist monk.
- 22 January: Johan Hultin, 97, Swedish-born American pathologist.
- 25 January: Fredrik Johansson, 47, Swedish heavy metal musician (Dark Tranquillity).
- 28 January: Elis Svärd, 25, golfer.
- 22 June: Jonny Nilsson, 79, ice speed skater.
- 6 July: Ing-Marie Wieselgren, 64, psychiatrist.
- 24 November: Borje Salming, 71, ice hockey player.
