= 2023 in Sweden =

- Decades: 2000s; 2010s; 2020s
- See also: Other events of 2023; Timeline of Swedish history

Events in the year 2023 in Sweden.

== Incumbents ==
- Monarch – Carl XVI Gustaf
- Prime minister – Ulf Kristersson

== Anniversaries ==
- Golden Jubilee of Carl XVI Gustaf
- Gothenburg quadricentennial jubilee

== Ongoing ==
- Accession of Sweden to NATO

== Events ==
- 12 January – Swedish mining company LKAB announces it has discovered Europe's largest known deposit of rare-earth elements in Kiruna.
- 19 January – Defence Minister Pål Jonson announces that Sweden will send its self-propelled Archer Artillery System, 50 Combat Vehicle 90 IFVs, and NLAW anti-tank missiles to Ukraine as part of its latest military support package for the Ukrainian military.
- 2 February: Muharrem Demirok is appointed new leader for the Swedish Centre Party, during its meeting in Helsingborg, following Annie Lööf's resignation.
- 22 March: The Parliament of Sweden approves Sweden's application for NATO membership.
- 25 March: Fredrik Reinfeldt is elected chairperson of the Swedish Football Association.
- late March and early April – 2023 Bandy World Championship (men's) and the 2023 Women's Bandy Championships in Åby, Växjö. Both the men's and women's tournaments hosted together.
- 13 May – Singer Loreen wins the previous year's running of Eurovision with the song "Tattoo".
- 1 June: Three people are injured after a knife attack in a school in Eskilstuna, Södermanland.
- 25 June: A train derails on Jetline at Gröna Lund, killing one and injuring nine others.
- 28 September:
  - It is reported that three people were killed this week in separate incidents in and near Stockholm, as deadly violence linked to a feud between criminal gangs escalates.
  - Prime Minister Ulf Kristersson summons the heads of the armed forces and police in response to the gang violence, saying that "We will hunt the gangs, we will defeat the gangs".
- 23 October: Turkish president Recep Tayyip Erdoğan submits a bill on granting Sweden membership into NATO to the Grand National Assembly.

== Deaths ==
=== January ===
- 2 January – Kajsa Thoor, 51, Swedish television presenter.
- 8 January – Patrick Grimlund, 50, Swedish television presenter.
- 13 January – Klas Lestander, 91, Swedish biathlete, Olympic champion (1960).
- 15 January – Jane Cederqvist, 77, Swedish swimmer, historian and government official, Olympic silver medalist (1960).
- 16 January – Mats Nordberg, 64, Swedish politician, MP (since 2018).

=== August ===
- Märta Johansson, 88, Swedish politician, MP (1994–2002).
