= Gothenburg attack =

Gothenburg attack can refer to any of the following attacks that have occurred within Gothenburg, Sweden.

- 1932 Gothenburg bombing, 1932 bombing at an apartment complex
- Gothenburg discothèque fire, 1998 arson attack on a discothèque
- Gothenburg pub shooting, 2015 mass shooting at a pub
- Gothenburg car bombing, 2015 car bombing
- 2017 Gothenburg Synagogue attack, 2017 arson attack on a synagogue
- 2021 Gothenburg explosion, 2021 bombing at an apartment complex
