= 2025 in Sweden =

- Decades: 2000s; 2010s; 2020s
- See also: Other events of 2025; Timeline of Swedish history

Events in the year 2025 in Sweden.

== Incumbents ==
- Monarch – Carl XVI Gustaf
- Prime minister – Ulf Kristersson
- Speaker – Andreas Norlén

== Events ==
=== January ===
- 27 January – Henrik Landerholm resigns as national security adviser after it is revealed that he had mishandled sensitive documents and data in improper locations.
- 28 January – A man is arrested after ramming his car into the gate of the Russian embassy in Stockholm.
- 29 January – Salwan Momika, who became controversial for burning a copy of the Koran outside the Stockholm Mosque in 2023, is shot dead in Södertälje.

=== February ===
- 4 February – Eleven people, including the gunman, are killed in a shooting at the Campus Risbergska adult education centre in Örebro.
- 21 February – A section of a submarine telecommunications cable running under the Baltic Sea between Finland and Germany is severed off the coast of Gotland.
- 27 February – A court in Germany sentences two Afghan nationals to up to five years imprisonment for plotting to attack the Riksdag and assassinate lawmakers in response to the burning of copies of the Koran.

=== April ===
- 29 April – 2025 Uppsala shooting: Three people are killed in a shooting at a hair salon in Uppsala.

=== May ===
- 9 May – Tobias Thyberg resigns as national security adviser a day after assuming the post following the release of sensitive images of him on Grindr.
- 9–25 May – 2025 IIHF World Championship in Denmark and Sweden.
- 17 May –
  - Sweden's KAJ finishes in fourth place at Eurovision 2025 in Switzerland with the single "Bara bada bastu".
  - Journalist Joakim Medin, who was imprisoned while covering the 2025 Turkish protests and convicted by a court in Turkey on charges of insulting President Recep Tayyip Erdoğan, is released and returned to Sweden following lobbying by the Swedish and other European foreign ministries.

=== June ===
- 17 June – Ten executives of the waste management company Think Pink are convicted and sentenced by a court in Södertörn to up to six years' imprisonment for improperly disposing and processing 200,000 tonnes of waste from the Stockholm area from 2015 to 2020 in Sweden's largest environmentally related crimes trial.

=== July ===
- 4 July – Ismail Abdo, the leader of the Rumba criminal gang, is arrested in Turkey.
- 16 July – A court in Gothenburg sentences three people to up to 22 years' imprisonment for the murder of rapper C.Gambino in 2024.
- 31 July – Osama Krayem, a Swedish Islamic State militant, is convicted and sentenced to life imprisonment for the killing of Jordanian pilot Muath al-Kasasbeh in Syria in 2015.

=== August ===
- 15 August – One person is killed in a shooting near a mosque in Örebro blamed on gang violence.

=== September ===
- 27 September – The Storkriket region is designated as a biosphere reserve by UNESCO.

=== November ===
- 8 November – A villa in Lidingö used by a Russian trade delegation is vandalised with paint dropped from a drone.
- 15 November – Three people are killed and three others are injured when a bus crashes into a bus stop in Östermalm, Stockholm.

=== December ===
- 28 December – At least three people are killed nationwide in weather-related incidents caused by Storm Johannes.

== Art and entertainment ==
- List of Swedish submissions for the Academy Award for Best International Feature Film

== Births ==
- 7 February – Princess Ines, Duchess of Västerbotten.

== Deaths ==
- 30 January – Leif Olsson, 82, radio and television presenter and handball referee.
- 21 April – Walter Frankenstein, 100, German-born engineer and Holocaust survivor.
- 16 May
  - Marianne Bernadotte, 100, actress, philanthropist and royal family member.
  - Meta Velander, 100, actress (Honeymoon, Dear Alice, Marmalade Revolution).
- 24 June – Clark Olofsson, 78, bank robber.
- 18 July – Percy Barnevik, 84, business executive.
- 20 July – Kenneth Hermele, 76, economist.
- 25 October – Björn Andrésen, 70, actor (Death in Venice) and musician.
- 29 October – Erik Paulsson, 83, founder of PEAB and chairman of Skistar (since 1977).
- 4 November – Runo Sundberg, 96, actor (Hem till byn).
- 9 November – Göran Ringbom, 81, musician.
- 11 November – Ingamay Bylund, 78, equestrian, Olympic bronze medalist (1984).

== Holidays ==
- 1 January – New Year's Day
- 6 January – Epiphany
- 18 April – Good Friday
- 20 April – Easter Sunday
- 21 April – Easter Monday
- 1 May – International Workers' Day
- 29 May – Ascension Day
- 6 June – National Day of Sweden
- 21 June – Midsummer Day
- 1 November – All Saints' Day
- 24 December – Christmas Eve
- 25 December – Christmas Day
- 26 December – 2nd Day of Christmas
