= 2026 in Sweden =

- Decades: 2000s; 2010s; 2020s
- See also: Other events of 2026; Timeline of Swedish history

Events in the year 2026 in Sweden.

== Incumbents ==
- Monarch – Carl XVI Gustaf
- Prime minister – Ulf Kristersson
- Speaker – Andreas Norlén

== Events ==
=== January ===
- 15 January–1 February – 2026 European Men's Handball Championship in Denmark, Norway, and Sweden.
- 28 January – Gröna Lund amusement park is fined $590,000 by the Stockholm District Court for negligence over the 2023 Jetline roller coaster accident that left one person dead.

=== February ===
- 25 February – The Swedish Armed Forces intercept a suspected Russian drone that was approaching the French aircraft carrier Charles de Gaulle in Malmö.

=== March ===
- 6 March – The Swedish Coast Guard boards the Guinean-flagged cargo vessel Caffa off Trelleborg on suspicion of transporting stolen Ukrainian grain to Russia and fraudulent registration.
- 13 March – Simona Mohamsson and Jimmie Åkesson, leaders of the Liberals and Sweden Democrats respectively, announce that their parties had come to an agreement which would see the Liberals eliminate any red lines against the Sweden Democrats in a future right-of-centre coalition.
- 18 March – Iran executes a dual Iranian-Swedish national convicted on charges of spying for Israel.

=== May ===
- 26 May – The Riksdag votes to ban marriage between cousins and other close relatives effective 1 July.

=== June ===
- 11 June–19 July – Sweden participates at the 2026 FIFA World Cup.

=== July ===
- 1 July – New laws take effect in Sweden, including a ban on cousin marriage, criminalization of psychological violence, and stricter rules on gun permits, explosives, and school background checks to improve safety and combat organized crime.
- 12 July – Sweden adapts its migration laws to the EU Migration and Asylum Pact. The right to free legal counsel for asylum applicants is limited, and the possibility of receiving a permanent residence permit for people with asylum-related permits is removed.
- 13 July – Stricter "good conduct" (vandel) requirements for residence permits take effect, giving the Swedish Migration Agency broader powers to refuse or revoke permits based on behaviour, including payment defaults, incorrect information, or links to criminal networks.
- 23 July – The government declares mining of critical metals and rare earth minerals a national security interest to reduce dependence on China. Deputy Prime Minister Ebba Busch announces a new strategy to speed up planning and attract investment, including the possible creation of a state-owned mining investment company.

=== August ===
- 21 August – A sword attack at Brinellskolan (Brinell School) in Fagersta kills one person and injures three others.
- 23 August – Israel imposes an entry ban against MEPs Jonas Sjöstedt and Hanna Gedin on charges of anti-state activities.
- 26 August–6 September – 2026 Women's European Volleyball Championship in Azerbaijan, Czech Republic, Sweden and Turkey.
- 31 August – Sweden officially ends its bilateral development aid programme to Liberia after 18 years; the embassy in Monrovia is scheduled to be fully wound down by 31 October.

=== September ===
- 8 September — Sweden sanctions products from Israeli settlements in the West Bank. (Note: However, Sweden clarified that settlement trade restrictions are contingent on EU action.)
- 16 September — Sweden expels an employee of the Iranian embassy due to security concerns. Iran expels a Swedish diplomat in response.
- 13 September –
  - 2026 Swedish general election: A coalition of left-wing parties win a majority of 176 seats in the 349-member Riksdag.
  - 2026 Swedish local elections

=== November ===
- 2 November – A cyberattack is carried out on refrigeration systems of supermarkets across seven European countries including Sweden, resulting in financial losses caused by food spoilage.

== Holidays ==
- 1 January – New Year's Day
- 6 January – Epiphany
- 3 April – Good Friday
- 5 April – Easter Sunday
- 6 April – Easter Monday
- 1 May – International Workers' Day
- 14 May – Ascension Day
- 6 June – National Day of Sweden
- 20 June – Midsummer Day
- 31 October – All Saints' Day
- 24 December – Christmas Eve
- 25 December – Christmas Day
- 26 December – 2nd Day of Christmas

== Deaths ==
- 9 January – Ulf Granberg, 80, comics creator and editor (The Phantom).
- 21 January – Princess Désirée, Baroness Silfverschiöld, 87, royal.
- 15 March – Thure Stenström, 98, literary historian.
