= 2024 in Sweden =

- Decades: 2000s; 2010s; 2020s
- See also: Other events of 2024; Timeline of Swedish history

Events in the year 2024 in Sweden.

== Incumbents ==
- Monarch – Carl XVI Gustaf
- Prime minister – Ulf Kristersson
- Speaker – Andreas Norlén

== Events ==
=== January ===
- 4 January – At least 1,000 cars are left stranded on the E22 highway between Hörby and Kristianstad for a day with people spending the night in their vehicles due to heavy snow. The Swedish Army intervenes, helping citizens get out of their vehicles and supplying them with basic amenities.
- 23 January – Turkey's Grand National Assembly approves Sweden's NATO membership bid.
- 25 January – Turkish President Recep Tayyip Erdoğan signs the proposal containing Sweden's accession protocol to NATO.

=== February ===
- 12 February – One person is killed in a fire while working on Liseberg's new waterpark called Oceana Liseberg in Gothenburg.
- 20 February – Sweden donates its largest military aid package to Ukraine to date with a further $680 million in aid.
- 26 February – Hungary's parliament ratifies Sweden's bid to join NATO.

=== March ===
- 7 March – Sweden officially joins NATO, becoming the 32nd member of the military alliance.

=== April ===
- 10 April – A 39-year-old man named Mikael Janicki was shot dead in a pedestrian tunnel in front of his 12-year-old son after confronting a group of youths in Skärholmen, Stockholm.
- 17 April – The Riksdag votes 234–94 in favor of lowering the minimum age for citizens to legally change their gender from 18 years to 16.

=== May ===
- 6 May – King Frederik X of Denmark and his wife, Queen Mary, make their first state visit to Sweden as new monarchs following the abdication of his mother Queen Margrethe II on 14 January.
- 7–11 May – Eurovision Song Contest 2024 at Malmö
- 9 May – Thousands of pro-Palestinian protesters march in Malmö, against Israel's participation in the Eurovision Song Contest 2024 and the contest's ban of pro-Palestinian content and imagery. Among the protesters is climate activist Greta Thunberg.
- 22 May – Sweden announces US$7 billion in military aid to Ukraine from 2024 to 2026.
- 29 May – Sweden announces a further package of $1.23 billion in military aid to Ukraine; the largest so far that it has given.
- 31 May – King Carl XVI Gustaf inducts pop music group ABBA, Nobel Prize laureates Anne L’Huillier and Svante Pääbo and nine other recipients into the Royal Order of Vasa in a ceremony at the Royal Palace in Stockholm, in the first distribution of the award since 1974.

=== June ===
- 7 June – The Royal Swedish Opera is fined 3 million kronor ($300,000) for the death of a stage technician who fell from a balcony during a workplace accident in 2023.
- 6–9 June – 2024 European Parliament election. The Social Democrats emerge as the largest party in the Swedish contingent to the European Parliament.
- 14 June – The US State Department designates the Nordic Resistance Movement as a terrorist organization. Three of its leaders are subsequently designated as Specially Designated Global Terrorists.
- 15 June – Hamid Nouri, an Iranian official serving life imprisonment in Sweden for his role in the 1988 executions of Iranian political prisoners, is released in exchange for two Swedish nationals held on charges of spying in Iran as part of a prisoner swap brokered by Oman.
- 20 June – The Stockholm District Court acquits former Syrian army general Mohammed Hamo on charges of aiding and abetting crimes against international law during the Syrian Civil War.

=== July ===
- 3 July – Investigators in Germany and Sweden arrest eight suspects allied with Syrian President Bashar al-Assad's government over alleged participation in crimes against humanity in Syria.
- 11 July – Polish divers discover a 19th-century shipwreck in the Baltic Sea off the coast of Öland, with crates of champagne and porcelain inside.

=== August ===
- 9 August – Mali expels the Swedish ambassador in response to Stockholm's decision to cut developmental aid to Bamako over its support for the Russian invasion of Ukraine.
- 14 August – Sweden, Denmark, Norway, and Finland form an international police hub in Stockholm to prevent escalating Swedish Gang activity and criminal networks from spreading to other Nordic countries.
- 13–25 August – 2024 World Masters Athletics Championships at Gothenburg
- 15 August – The first case of clade 1b mpox outside Africa is discovered in Stockholm from a patient who had travelled to Africa.
- 28 August – Prosecutors charge Salwan Momika and Salwan Najem with four counts of "offences of agitation against an ethnic or national group after the two desecrated the Quran and made derogatory remarks about Muslims in Stockholm in 2023.

=== September ===
- 4 September – Foreign Minister Tobias Billström announced his resignation from the government and the Riksdag effective 10 September. He is replaced by Maria Malmer Stenergard as part of a cabinet reshuffle by Prime Minister Ulf Kristersson.
- 9 September – The exiled National Council of Resistance of Iran claims that its offices in Stockholm were firebombed overnight with Molotov cocktails. The Swedish Police Authority announces that they have opened an investigation into arson.
- 24 September –
  - Swedish authorities formally accuse Iran of carrying out a 2023 cyberattack involving the dissemination of 15,000 messages calling for revenge against people who had burned Korans.
  - Lithium-ion technology developer Northvolt announces revised company operational scopes and its intention to layoff 1,600 workers in the country.

=== October ===
- 1 October – Unidentified gunmen open fire at the Israeli embassy in Stockholm.
- 8 October – The government issues an update of the country's civil defence guidelines for the first time since 2018 to take into account Sweden's accession into NATO and the Russian invasion of Ukraine.

=== November ===
- 5 November – Rasmus Paludan, the leader of the far-right Stram Kurs party, is convicted by the Malmö District Court of "incitement against an ethnic group" following racist and Islamophobic comments made in 2022 and is sentenced to four months' imprisonment.
- 17 November – A section of a submarine internet cable running under the Baltic Sea between Lithuania and Gotland is severed.
- 18 November – A section of the C-Lion1 submarine communications cable running under the Baltic Sea between Finland and Germany is severed off the coast of Öland in a suspected act of sabotage.

=== December ===
- 2 December – Two sections of a submarine communications cable running under the Baltic Sea between Finland and Sweden are cut in what Swedish authorities suspect as an act of sabotage.
- The king Carl XVI Gustaf and Queen Silvia attended memorial service for the 2004 Indian Ocean Tsunami.

== Art and entertainment ==
- List of Swedish submissions for the Academy Award for Best International Feature Film

== Holidays ==
- 1 January – New Year's Day
- 6 January – Epiphany
- 29 March – Good Friday
- 31 March – Easter Sunday
- 1 April – Easter Monday
- 1 May – International Workers' Day
- 9 May – Ascension Day
- 6 June – National Day of Sweden
- 22 June – Midsummer Day
- 2 November – All Saints' Day
- 24 December – Christmas Eve
- 25 December – Christmas Day
- 26 December – 2nd Day of Christmas

== Deaths ==
=== January ===
- 4 January – Marie Nilsson Lind, 62, singer (Ainbusk).
- 8 January – Carl-Erik Asplund, 100, speed skater, Olympic bronze medalist (1952).
- 14 January – Mohamed Said, 36, actor (Andra Avenyn).
- 23 January – Anders Sandberg, 55, singer (Rednex).
- 29 January – Arne Hegerfors, 81, sports journalist.

=== February ===
- 4 February – Liliane Carlberg, 87, television producer.
- 7 February – Qristina Ribohn, 68, reality television personality and politician.

=== July ===
- 7 July – Bengt I. Samuelsson, 90, biochemist and Nobel laureate (1982).
- 22 July – Elisabeth Fleetwood, 96, Swedish politician.

=== August ===
- 8 August – Boo Ahl, ice hockey goaltender (born 1969, died in Norway).
- 23 August – Peter Lundgren, 59, tennis player and coach. (death announced on this day)
- 26 August – Sven-Göran Eriksson, 76, football player and manager (IFK Göteborg, Benfica, England national team), pancreatic cancer.

== See also ==
- 2024 in the European Union
- 2024 in Europe
