= Applet (disambiguation) =

An applet a small software application.

It may also refer to:

- Aplets & Cotlets, a candy
- Äpplet, a ship
