= Ebba Andersson =

Ebba Andersson is the name of:

- Ebba Andersson (cross-country skier) (born 1997), Swedish cross-country skier
- Ebba Andersson (footballer) (1935–2021), Swedish footballer
