= 2027 in Sweden =

- Decades: 2000s; 2010s; 2020s
- See also: Other events of 2027; Timeline of Swedish history

Events in the year 2027 in Sweden.

== Events ==
=== Predicted and scheduled events ===
- 24–28 February – NordicFuzzCon in Malmö, Sweden
- 16–27 June – EuroBasket Women 2027 in Belgium, Finland, Lithuania and Sweden

== Holidays ==
- 1 January – New Year's Day
- 6 January – Epiphany
- 26 March – Good Friday
- 28 March – Easter Sunday
- 29 March – Easter Monday
- 1 May – May Day
- 6 May – Ascension Day
- 16 May – Ascension Day
- 6 June – National Day of Sweden
- 20 June – Midsummer Day
- 6 November – All Saints' Day
- 24 December – Christmas Eve
- 25 December – Christmas Day
- 26 December – 2nd Day of Christmas
