= Rape of Queena Vuong =

2008 kidnapping, assault, and rape in Florida, U.S.

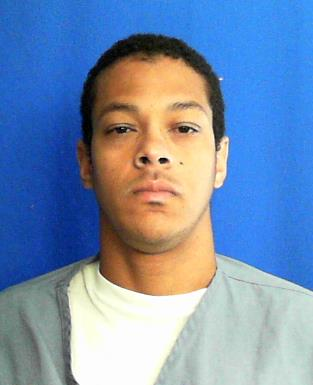
- Kendrick Morris (ca. 2026)
- Location: Hillsborough County, Florida, United States
- Date: April 24, 2008
- Target: Queena Vong
- Attack type: Kidnapping; assault; rape
- Perpetrators: Kendrick Morris, 16-years-old
- Verdict: Guilty
- Convictions: Life imprisonment
- Judge: Chet A. Tharpe

On April 24, 2008, 18-year-old student Queena Vuong was kidnapped and suffered rape, assault, and aggravated battery by 16-year-old Kendrick Morris in Hillsborough County, Florida. The crimes were described by the court as "especially heinous, atrocious, brutal, and cruel."

== Personae ==
Queena Vuong was born in 1990, to Vietnamese American parents who had fled Vietnam as boat refugees.

Kendrick Morris was born in 1991 and raised by his mother and his grandmother. (Note: Not related to Kendrick Morris, juvenile, convicted in 2015 for attempted murder, aggravated battery, and unlawful possession of a firearm and sentenced to 65 years in prison. See Kendrick Morris v. State of Indiana (mem. dec.) (Indiana Court of Appeals July 7, 2016), Text.) Kendrick's mother was in a relationship with Steve White, a professional football player with the Tampa Bay Buccaneers, with whom, along with her son, she allegedly lived for a time.

== Crime ==
On the evening of April 24, 2008, high-school senior Queena Vuong drove to the library to return some books. While talking on a cell phone with a friend, she mentioned there was a man on the benches outside. At 10:39 p.m., her friend heard Vuong screaming and the call was disconnected. Her family along with some friends rushed to the location, where they found her bloodied and beaten into unconsciousness in an isolated area west of the library, whereupon the police and the health emergency services were notified.

The Hillsborough County Sheriff's Office found blood on a driveway outside the Bloomingdale Regional Public Library, as well as elsewhere, including on a wall of the library's building. It was established that Vuong had been raped but also beaten so violently that she suffered severe brain damage disabling completely her vision and ability to talk, walk, and swallow.

Police sought 16-year-old Kendrick Morris for questioning, after witnesses stated that Morris, a "troubled student" at Valrico's Bloomingdale High School, frequented the library after school when waiting, usually until late, for his mother to pick him up. The Florida Department of Law Enforcement matched semen found on the body of the victim to Morris. After the forensic authorities ran Morris' DNA through the Florida state database, they also linked him to the June 2007 rape of a 62-year-old worker at Children's Lighthouse Day Care Center, located less than a mile from Morris' Clair-Mel home.

== Judicial process ==
In 2011, Morris was tried in Florida's 13th Judicial Circuit Court, charged for crimes committed against the two women, with chief judge Chet A. Tharpe presiding.

The prosecution, in making their case, mainly went through the forensic evidence supporting the guilt of the defendant.

The defense presented to the court the defendant's history growing up in a household where he ostensibly suffered "abusive punishment." Psychologists Berney Wilkinson and James Garbarino testified that Morris suffered abuse from his mother and White, including beatings from his "stepfather" that left verifiable scars on his body. White refused to comment on the allegations, until 2017, when he released a statement on Twitter in which he "vehemently" denied them. He claimed that all are false, he was never Morris's "stepfather," he hasn't lived with Morris or his mother since 2000, and had "very little contact" with Morris during the time period when the alleged abuse took place. (Note: White died in 2022.)

The jury found Morris guilty on all counts: for sexual battery, armed robbery, and burglary against the Day Care Center worker, and for kidnapping, aggravated battery, and rape against Queena Vuong. The judge sentenced him to 65 years in prison.

On April 24, 2012, Vuong's family filed suit against Morris' mother and grandmother, alleging "negligent supervision" of the defendant. Morris had a juvenile arrest record, a history of violent and abusive behavior, and was under restrictions by the Florida Department of Juvenile Justice, the suit stated, yet his legal guardians failed to supervise him, and, instead, allowed him to violate curfew and restrictions. The case was dismissed for lack of prosecution in October 2013.

In 2015, Morris appealed the Circuit Court's decision, arguing it violated the Eighth Amendment to the United States Constitution that protects defendants against cruel and unusual punishment. The appeal argued that the 65-year, without-parole imprisonment is the "functional equivalent of life without parole" and cited decisions by the United States Supreme Court (Note: Roper v. Simmons (2005) held that it is unconstitutional to impose capital punishment for crimes committed while under the age of 18, overruling Stanford v. Kentucky (1989) and overturning statutes in twenty five states. Graham v. Florida (2010) held that, for non-homicide offenses, juvenile offenders cannot be sentenced to life imprisonment without parole. Miller v. Alabama (2012), held that any mandatory sentence of life without the possibility of parole for juvenile offenders is unconstitutional, in a ruling that applied even to persons who had committed murder as a juvenile, thus extending the restriction beyond Graham v. Florida. Finally, Montgomery v. Louisiana, (2016), extended its Miller v. Alabama ruling as applicable retroactively, in a decision that affected more than two thousand cases nationwide. The last two decisions mandated a separate finding by the court that the juvenile defendant is "permanently incorrigible" before they could be sentenced to life without parole.) and the Florida Supreme Court that declared such lengthy prison sentences without a chance of parole for juvenile offenders to be unconstitutional.

The Court accepted the appeal and ordered that the defendant be re-sentenced.

In March 2017, judge Chet A. Tharpe, again presiding, announced that the defendant, by then 25 years of age, was sentenced to life imprisonment, with a court to review the case and the sentence in 2037, the latter provision removing the equivalency to life without parole.

As of 2026, Morris is incarcerated at the South Bay Correctional Facility.

== Judicial developments ==
Regarding the course towards leniency for juvenile criminal offenders, in the 2021 case, "Jones v. Mississippi", about a 15-year-old offender sentenced to life without parole for fatally stabbing his grandfather, the US Supreme Court held, with a 6–3 decision, that the states have the discretionary ability to hold juvenile offenders to life sentences without parole without having to make a separate assessment of the offenders' "incorrigibility." The majority opinion was written by Justice Brett Kavanaugh, to which Justice Sonia Sotomayor dissented, joined by Justices Stephen Breyer and Elena Kagan.

== Victim's path to recovery ==
In the years following the attack, Queena, now going by the name Queena Phu, has been doing physical exercises to recover her lost abilities, making small, incremental improvements. She's assisted by her sister Anna Donato and her mother, who, in 2020, published The Life She Once Knew about her daughter's predicament.

== See also ==
- Skellefteå assault case
- Rape statistics
- Juvenile delinquency in the United States
