= 1932 Gothenburg bombing =

Bombing in Gothenburg, Sweden

- Gothenburg (Sweden)
- Location: 57.69594°N 11.94789°E; Vegagatan 3 Gothenburg, Sweden
- Date: 15 February 1932; 94 years ago 02:30 (UTC+01:00)
- Attack type: Bombing, suicide bombing, murder–suicide, attempted uxoricide
- Weapon: Dynamite
- Deaths: 4 (including the perpetrator)
- Injuries: 7
- Perpetrator: Bernhard Johansson
- Motive: Plan to kill ex-wife

On 15 February 1932, three people were killed and seven others wounded in an explosion at an apartment building in Gothenburg, Sweden. Investigators determined that Bernhard Johansson, whose ex-wife lived in the complex, had intentionally detonated explosives to kill her. He was found dead of self-inflicted injuries that morning.

== Background ==
In the 1920s, Bernhard Johansson married a woman named Karin, with whom he had a daughter. Bernhard had a troubled life, serving several stints in mental institutions and prisons before his marriage. She filed for divorce soon after their marriage's beginning, angering Bernhard, who sent her repeated death threats. After the divorce, Johansson was convicted of assaulting several women and sentenced to psychiatric care. He was released on 25 January 1932, and immediately continued writing threatening letters to Karin. Believing that he was a threat, Karin moved to Vegagatan 3 with a couple she knew.

== Events ==
=== Preparation ===
Johansson learned where his ex-wife lived and began preparing to kill her. He stole 9 kilograms (20 lb) of dynamite from a warehouse, which he gave to a 17-year-old male relative in a package. On 14 February, the boy, as requested by Johansson, ascertained that Karin was inside the apartment before placing the package in the apartment building's stairwell. Johansson allegedly had the package placed in the stairwell so that Karin, who slept on the kitchen sofa, would be killed in the blast.

=== Bombings and manhunt ===
Map of the bombings. Marked are Vegagatan 3, where the main bombing took place, and Slottsskogen, approximately where Johansson killed himself.

At 2:30 a.m., the dynamite exploded, causing significant damage to the apartment building, which Byggnadsarbetaren reported was "roughly split in half." Witnesses reported seeing a man run out of the building and flee by bicycle just before the detonation. Three people were killed and seven others were injured. The couple with whom Karin lived died, as well as an elderly neighbor. Unbeknownst to Johansson, Karin had been sleeping in a different place in the apartment and had only suffered minor injuries.

The local police immediately began investigating, calling a manhunt for the perpetrator, who they had quickly identified as Johansson. At 8:30 a.m., police found a badly mutilated body in Slottsskogen, between the ponds Stora and Lilla Dammen. The body was later identified as Johansson. Coroners surmised that he had placed dynamite in his mouth and detonated it, killing himself.

== Aftermath ==
The bombing was major news in Swedish media. Göteborgs-Tidningen said that "a more brutal and horrible crime should rarely or never have been committed in our country."
