= Public holidays in Sweden =

In Sweden, public holidays (Swedish: helgdagar) are established by acts of Parliament (the Riksdag). The official holidays can be divided into Christian and non-Christian holidays. The Christian holidays are jul (Christmas), trettondedag jul (Epiphany), påsk (Easter), Kristi himmelsfärds dag (Ascension Day), pingstdagen (Pentecost), and alla helgons dag (All Saints' Day). The non-Christian holidays are: nyårsdagen (New Year's Day), första maj (International Workers' Day), Sveriges nationaldag (National Day), and midsommar (Midsummer). Midsummer is, however, officially also a Christian holiday to celebrate John the Baptist's birthday.

In addition to this, all Sundays are official holidays, but they are not as important as the main holidays. The names of the Sundays follow the liturgical calendar and they should be categorized as Christian holidays. Easter Sunday and Pentecost are always on Sundays, but they are seen more like main holidays than ordinary Sundays. When the standard working week in Sweden was reduced to 40 hours by the Riksdag, all Saturdays became de facto public holidays. Holy Saturday, Midsummer's Eve, Christmas Eve, and New Year's Eve are also de facto holidays.

Part of the Swedish tradition is the celebration of Lucia (Saint Lucia Day). She is the only saint to be celebrated in Lutheran Sweden (as well as those parts of Norway and Finland, where Swedish influence has historically been prominent). The celebration, which, however, is not a public holiday, always takes place on 13 December and retains many pre-Christian traditions. The same is also true for many holidays in Sweden.

In Sweden, a public holiday is sometimes referred to as röd dag (red day), as it is printed in red in most calendars. It is quite common for some businesses to close at noon the day before certain holidays, and also if a holiday falls on a Tuesday or a Thursday, Swedes will commonly take off the klämdag (squashed in days, or squeeze day) that falls between the holiday and the weekend.

== Tradition ==
In Swedish tradition many holidays have their main celebrations not on the Day but on the Eve of the holiday, meaning one day earlier. This is especially significant on Christmas Eve, Holy Saturday, and Midsummer Eve, but also on New Year's Eve; however, in this case it is not really unique. Christmas Eve, Midsummer Eve, and New Year's Eve might very well be the single most important holidays during the entire year for the Swedish. These days are however only de facto holidays. There are also de facto half-day holidays (with some variation depending on employer): Twelfth Night, Maundy Thursday, Walpurgis Night, the day before Ascension Day, and the day before All Saints' Day.

The Swedish calendar also provides for special flag flying days. Flag flying days are in some cases official holidays or the birthdays and namedays for the Royal family and informal holidays like Gustavus Adolphus Day (6 November) or the Nobel Day (10 December). There is no formal connection between flag flying days and holiday. Many flag flying days are ordinary workdays.

The official National holiday of Sweden is celebrated on 6 June, a status which it was finally granted in 2005, removing Whit Monday as a public holiday. The Name days in Sweden calendar is also denoted. It has a long history, originally a calendar of saints, some names have stuck throughout centuries while others have been modernized.

== Several observances at once ==
There are instances where official holidays, de facto half days, official flagdays and other observances clash and several celebrations may run concurrently. One such case is the 30 April which is immediately followed by 1 May. 30 April is a de facto half day because it is the Walpurgis Night and the main day for celebrations to the arrival of the spring season. The following day is actually Walpurgis Day; however, in the calendar it is primarily denoted as May Day, or Labor Day. This means that depending on your sympathies you may either celebrate it as May Day or as Walpurgis Day. In addition to this 30 April is also the king's birthday and an official flag flying day. Also 1 May is an official flag flying day by virtue of May Day or Walpurgis day. If either day would fall on a Sunday, that day would also in that respect be an official holiday and a Christian holiday, as one of the Sundays following Easter.

In 2008, due to the unusually early Easter, Ascension Day occurred on 1 May. This was the first time this happened since May Day became a public holiday in 1939. The next time these holidays overlap is in 2160. The next time Ascension Day will coincide with Walpurgis Night on 30 April (which is the earliest possible day) is in 2285.

== Festivities ==
See Swedish festivities

== List of public holidays in Sweden ==
English name	Local name	Date of observation	Moveable date
New Year's Day	Nyårsdagen	1 January	
Epiphany	Trettondedag jul	6 January	
Good Friday	Långfredagen	Friday before Easter Sunday	18 April 2025; 3 April 2026; 26 March 2027
Easter Monday	Annandag påsk	Monday after Easter Sunday	21 April 2025; 6 April 2026; 29 March 2027
International Workers' Day	Första Maj	1 May	
Ascension Day	Kristi himmelsfärds dag	Thursday, 39 days after Easter Sunday	29 May 2025; 14 May 2026; 6 May 2027
National Day of Sweden	Sveriges nationaldag	6 June	
Midsummer's Day	Midsommardagen	Saturday during the period 20–26 June	21 June 2025; 20 June 2026; 26 June 2027
All Saints' Day	Alla helgons dag	Saturday during the period 31 October – 6 November	1 November 2025; 31 October 2026; 6 November 2027
Christmas Day	Juldagen	25 December	
Second Day of Christmas	Annandag jul	26 December	

=== Public holidays always on Sunday ===
Some public holidays in Sweden always occur on Sundays but are, in fact, official public holidays. This will usually not affect working schedules or ordinary opening hours.

Holiday	Date of observation	Moveable date
Easter Sunday (påskdagen)	The first Sunday after a full moon on or after 21 March	20 April 2025; 5 April 2026; 28 March 2027
Pentecost Sunday (pingstdagen)	The 7th Sunday (49 days) after Easter Sunday	8 June 2025; 24 May 2026; 16 May 2027

=== De facto full holidays and half holidays ===
The day before an official holiday is in most cases treated as a de facto holiday in two variants, full day and half day.

==== De facto full holidays ====
The de facto holidays are almost always treated as official holidays by employers, so most employees working regular office hours do not work these days.

De facto holiday	Date of observation	Moveable date
Midsummer Eve (midsommarafton)	The Friday during the period 19–25 June.	20 Jun 2025; 19 Jun 2026; 25 Jun 2027
Christmas Eve (julafton)	24 December	
New Year's Eve (nyårsafton)	31 December	

==== De facto half holidays ====
The de facto half holidays are often treated with the afternoon off, but this varies depending on employer. It is more common to work a full workday than not these days. Many of the employees that have half days off have a slightly longer workweek the rest of the year to compensate for the time off. In many cases employees take the whole day off, combining the half holiday with some other form of leave.

De facto half holiday	Date of observation	Moveable date
Twelfth Night (trettondagsafton)	5 January	
Walpurgis Night (valborgsmässoafton)	30 April	
All Saints' Eve (alla helgons afton)	The day before All Saints' Day	31 October 2025; 30 October 2026; 5 November 2027

==== Eves always on Saturdays ====
For most employees there is little practical difference between these eves and the other Saturdays of the year, which means they are de facto holidays.

Eves always on Saturdays	Date of observation	Moveable date
Holy Saturday (påskafton)	The day before Easter Sunday	19 April 2025; 4 April 2026; 27 March 2027
Whitsun Eve (pingstafton)	The day before Pentecost (Whitsunday)	07 Jun 2025; 23 May 2026; 15 May 2027

==== Klämdag (squeeze day) ====
Days between a holiday and a weekend are in Swedish called klämdagar (squeeze days). These may arise at different holidays, but there is one permanent klämdag every year. Many people are off work on klämdagar getting long weekends. In some cases employers treat some of these days as de facto holidays; in other cases people may use some form of leave (e.g. vacation).

klämdag (squeeze day)	Type	Moveable date
The Friday after Ascension Day	Permanent	30 May 2025; 15 May 2026; 07 May 2027
The Friday after New Year's Day 2026; The Monday before Epiphany 2026; The Friday after Epiphany 2028; The Monday before International Worker's Day 2029	Additional	2 January 2026; 5 January 2026; 7 January 2028; 30 April 2029

==== Christmas week and the first days of January ====
During Christmas week and the days before and after Epiphany many Swedes are off from work, combining holidays, de facto holidays and other forms of leave (e.g., vacation). It is, in fact, quite common to leave work before Christmas Eve and then not come back to work until around 10 January (after the weekend after Epiphany). Most people, however, work at least some of these days. For instance, in 2024, Christmas Eve falls on a Tuesday, with Christmas Day falling on a Wednesday and the Second Day of Christmas on a Thursday. Thus, some employees are automatically allowed the day off (as they are klämdagar) on the Monday before Christmas Eve (23 December) and the Friday after the Second Day of Christmas (27 December), while others choose to take those days off as vacation. The same goes for the Monday before New Year's Eve (30 December). However, the Thursday and Friday after New Year's Day (2 and 3 January 2025) are not considered klämdagar, since they are two workdays falling next to each other. Thus, if people wanted those days off, they would have had to take them as vacation. As most people in Sweden are not required to work on Saturdays or Sundays, people could work their last day on 20 December, having taken two or five vacation days, and then not have to return to work until 7 January (the Tuesday after Epiphany).

== See also ==
- Flag flying days in Sweden
- Name days in Sweden
