= Äpplet =

Swedish warship

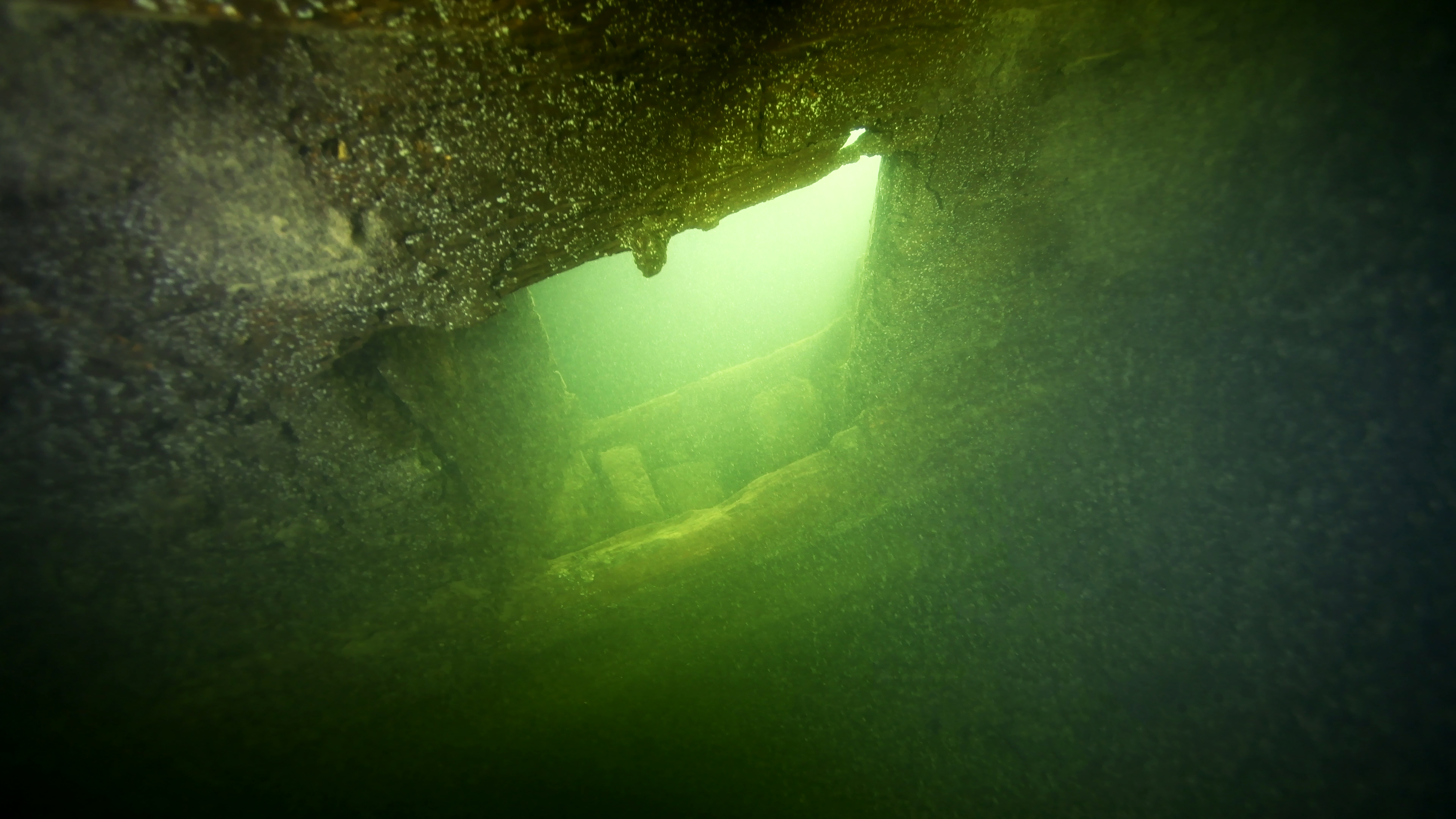
- One of Äpplet's upper gundeck gunports

History

Sweden
- Launched: 1629
- Fate: Sunk as part of defenses near Vaxholm

Äpplet ("the globus cruciger"; literally "the apple") was a Swedish warship built in the late 1620s as the sister ship of Vasa, intended as one of the largest and most prestigious ships in the Swedish navy under King Gustavus Adolphus. Äpplet was built in the same shipyard in Stockholm as Vasa but finished somewhat later and with different proportions. The reason for the different proportions was the replacement of the original shipwright Henrik Hybertsson who died in 1627 with Hein Jakobsson who also attempted to widen Vasa while it was being built. Äpplet was launched in 1629 less than year after the embarrassing loss of Vasa on its maiden voyage. The ship was not a great success but served as part of the escort for Swedish troops to Germany as part of the Thirty Years' War. Smaller ships were generally chosen by Admiral of the Realm since they were more maneuverable. In 1658, Äpplet was in poor condition and deemed too expensive to repair and was sunk outside Vaxholm to block one of the main inlets to the capital of Stockholm.

Maritime archeologists at the Museum of Wrecks in Stockholm located a large wreck in December 2021. During the spring of 2022 it was surveyed and measured, and was identified as sister ship of Vasa in October 2022. Äpplet is considered to be well-preserved even if parts of the upper gun deck have collapsed. The identification of the ship was made due to similarities in the beam construction and that the oak used to build the ships was felled around Mälaren sometime during 1627, as was the case with some of Vasa's timbers.
