= Murder of Lisa Holm =

2015 murder in Blomberg, Sweden

- Date: 7 June 2015
- Location: Blomberg, Sweden
- Cause: Strangulation
- Convicted: Nerijus Bilevičius
- Sentence: Life imprisonment; Deportation to Lithuania to serve sentence

Lisa Holm, a 17-year-old girl from Skövde working in Blomberg in Götene Municipality, Sweden, disappeared on 7 June 2015 and her body was found days later in a workshed. Her disappearance, the search for her, and the trial and conviction of Nerijus Bilevičius for her murder received widespread media attention in Sweden and Scandinavia.

== Murder ==
On the 7th of June, 2015, Lisa Helena Holm (born 7 February 1998) was about to end her shift at a cafe where she had been working for the summer in Blomberg, close to Källby in Västergötland. She sent a text message at 18:23 to her father in Skövde, saying that she was on her way home on her moped. When Holm did not show up, her father drove to her workplace, hoping she was still there. When he found her moped with keys still in the ignition at the cafe, he and the cafe owner searched the cafe and nearby area without finding anything. At 21:47 they called the police and reported Holm missing. The police soon arrived and started dog searches in the area, in a barn there with several rooms, but found nothing. A glove was later found there.

== Discovery of body ==
On Tuesday June 9, the search team found Holm's cellphone case, receipts, tickets and similar items, all of which was identified as belonging to Holm. On Wednesday 10 June, the search area was extended, and the Swedish version of the organization Missing People was called in to help with the search. That day, a pair of earrings was found in the barn. Her license card for her moped and keys to her home were also found that day. On Friday 12 June, the Missing People organization searched the Martorp estate a few kilometres from the cafe. Two people arrived there by car, claiming that the area already had been searched. Missing People representatives became suspicious and called police. They continued to search the area and found a jacket and a helmet belonging to Holm. Later that same night, Holm's body was found in a workshed nearby.

== Trial ==
The county court concluded that Holm had been murdered by hanging or strangulation. Technical evidence showed that DNA from Lithuanian citizen Nerijus Bilevičius (born 3 March 1980) was on pieces of rope and ten pieces of Holm's clothing, both inside and out, as well as all over the crime scene. Police and the court also found that Bilevičius had no alibi for the day of the murder. The motive was of a sexual nature. On his computer, police found pornography, and technical findings showed that he had been very active sexually in the shed. His actions at Martorp when Missing People first showed up also indicated that he did not want police to continue searching that particular area.

The circumstances were considered especially heinous by investigators as Holm was only seventeen years old and physically weaker than Bilevičius. He showed great ruthlessness and criminal intent and police stated that Holm had suffered before finally being murdered at the scene. Bilevičius was sentenced to life imprisonment on 17 November 2015.

His attorney Björn Hurtig filed at the court of appeals on 15 April 2016. Hurtig's reasons to appeal his client's sentence were given as someone else having helped or committed the murder and removed the body of Holm, such as the convict's wife. On 2 May 2016, the court of appeals declined to grant a new review or trial, and his life sentence became final.

== Conviction and aftermath ==
On 4 July 2016, it was announced that Bilevičius would be placed at Norrtälje Prison, a high-security facility. He was transferred to Lithuania in early 2017, and later that year won an appeal and got 15 years, but by an appellate court in Šiauliai in late 2017 his sentence was again set at life imprisonment.

== Bilevičius' death ==
Bilevičius was frequently harassed by other inmates in Swedish prison and often needed medical attention – he was beaten up many times and on occasion drenched in boiling water. He was transferred to Lithuanian prison and harassed by other inmates in Lithuania as well. On 3 August 2022, around 6 p.m. local time, another inmate stabbed Bilevičius in the neck with an improvised knife while on a walk in Marijampolė Correction House. Bilevičius died while being transported to a hospital.

== See also ==
- Skellefteå assault case
- Lists of solved missing person cases
