= Birgitta Rasmusson =

Swedish writer (1939–2021)

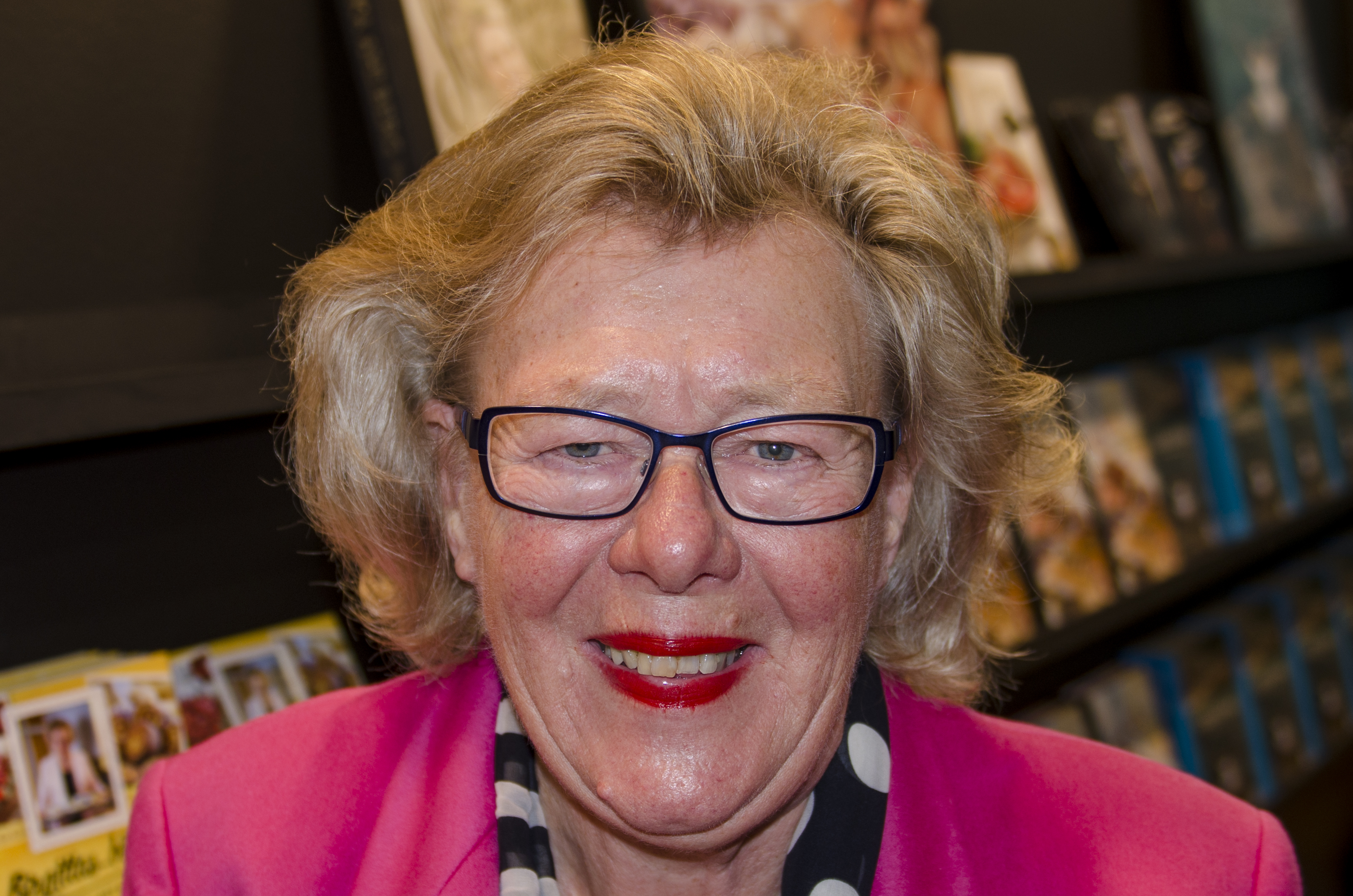
- Birgitta Rasmusson during the Göteborg Book Fair in September 2014
- Born: Kerstin Birgitta Rasmusson; 4 September 1939; Ljungskile, Sweden
- Died: 5 March 2021 (aged 81); Stockholm, Sweden

Kerstin Birgitta Rasmusson (4 September 1939 – 5 March 2021) was a Swedish television personality, baker and author of several cookbooks, some focused on cakes. Between 2012 and 2019, she was a judge on Hela Sverige bakar, which was broadcast on TV4. She reprised the role for its celebrity version.

Rasmusson died on 5 March 2021, at the age of 81.

== Bibliography ==
- 2004 – Rasmusson Birgitta, red. Kokbok för dig som har diabetes: grundkokboken med recept för hela dagen. ISBN 9153424107
- 2004 – Rasmusson, Birgitta; Weiland Agneta, Svensson Ulf, Thell Göran. Mat med smak: 350 recept från Ica provkök : med inspiration från fem världsdelar. ISBN 9153425162
- 2011 – Rasmusson Birgitta, Paulsson Berit, red. Rutiga bakboken: [över 500 goda matbröd, vetebröd, mjuka kakor, småkakor, bakelser, tårtor och pajer]. ISBN 9789153435990
- 2015 – Rasmusson Birgitta, Paulsson Berit, red. Rutiga kokboken: grundkokboken med över 1500 recept för stora och små hushåll. ISBN 9789187785535
- 2016 – Rasmusson, Birgitta; Kleinschmidt Wolfgang. Birgittas bästa: favoritrecepten till det svenska fikat. ISBN 9789174616170
- 2017 – Rasmusson, Birgitta; Pousette Ulrika. Birgittas bästa julkakor. ISBN 9789174619232
- 2019 – Rasmusson, Birgitta; Svensson Ulf. Birgittas bästa – kakor vi minns. ISBN 9789178614912
