= Runo Sundberg =

Swedish actor (1929–2025)

Runo Sundberg (8 April 1929 – 4 November 2025) was a Swedish actor and comedian.

== Life and career ==
Sundberg was born in Skövde, Skaraborg County on 8 April 1929. He was known for being a voice actor on the children's series Skrotnisse och hans vänner. In later years, he participated in Radio Skaraborg with columns under the heading Grandfather's Thoughts. Several of Sundberg's monologues and songs have been released on gramophone records. He was also a frequent actor at the Casino theatre in Stockholm..

From 1995 to 2006, he appeared in the series Hem till byn, playing pensioner Börjesson.

Sundberg died on 4 November 2025, at the age of 96.
