= Kajsa Thoor =

Swedish television journalist (1971–2023)

Kajsa Thoor (2 June 1971 – 2 January 2023) was a Swedish journalist and television presenter who was employed by Sveriges Television (SVT) in the 1990s. She was born on 2 June 1971. In 1998 she was among the participants of a competition called På spåret. She died at age 51 in Malmö on 2 January 2023 after being injured in an apartment fire.
