= Lars Westman (writer) =

Swedish writer and journalist (1934–2021)

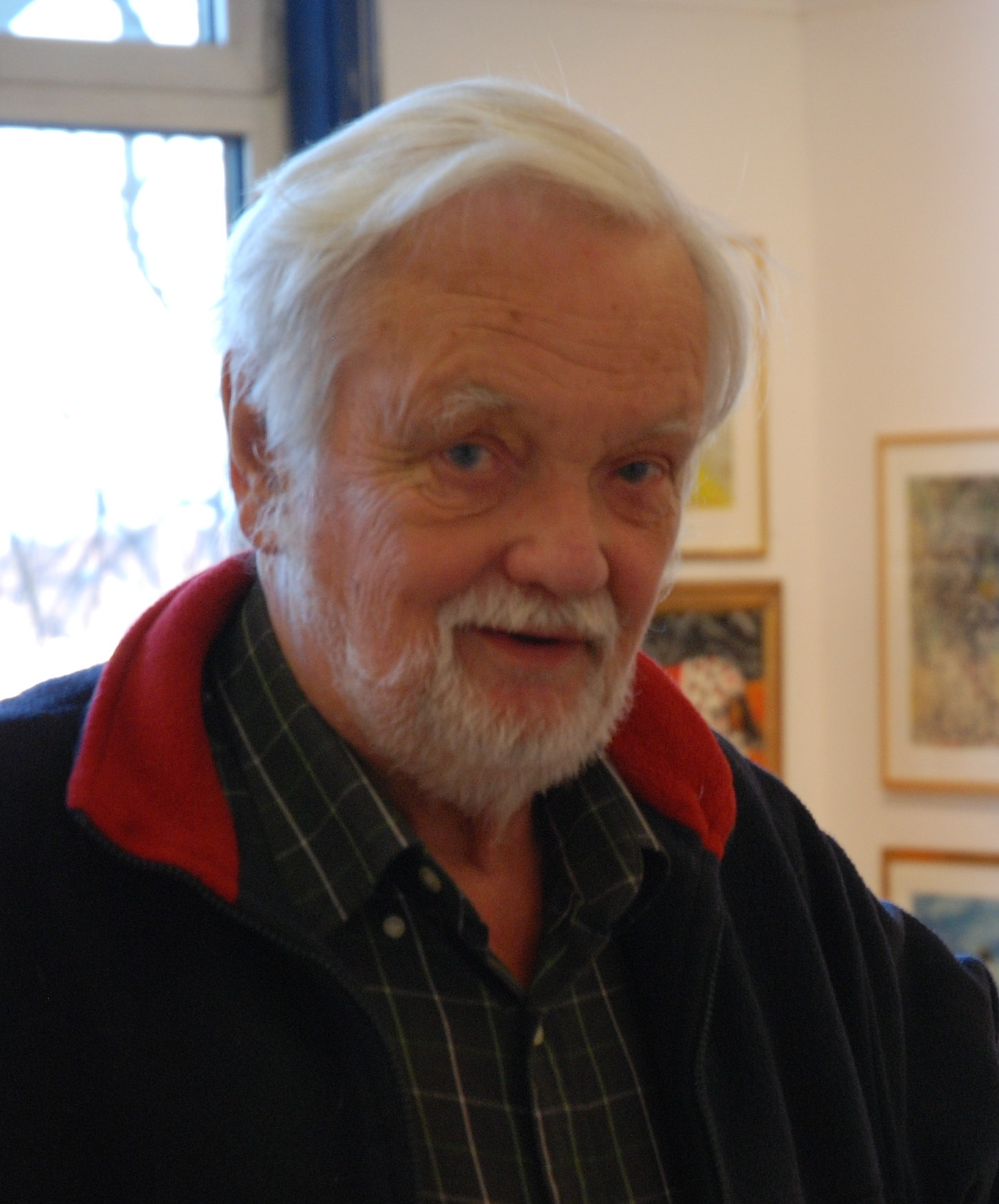
Lars Westman, 2010.

Lars Gustaf Westman (16 April 1934 – 16 January 2021) was a Swedish writer and journalist.

== Biography ==
Westman was the grandson of architect Carl Westman and the artist Elin Westman. He was, for many years, a journalist at Stockholms-Tidningen and the magazine We. He was the author of many books, including The Outer Isles: Life in the Outer Seaboard of Stockholm Archipelago and Air pollution and vegetation around a sulphite mill at örnsköldsvik, North Sweden: pollutants and plant communities on exposed rocks. In 2012, he published the book Till Saltsjöbaden. Other published books are På liv och död (2006), Om X-et och Saltsjöbaden, and the children's book Springtjuven – ett Stockholmsmysterium.
