= Visättra =

Coordinates: 59.2170°N 17.9529°E

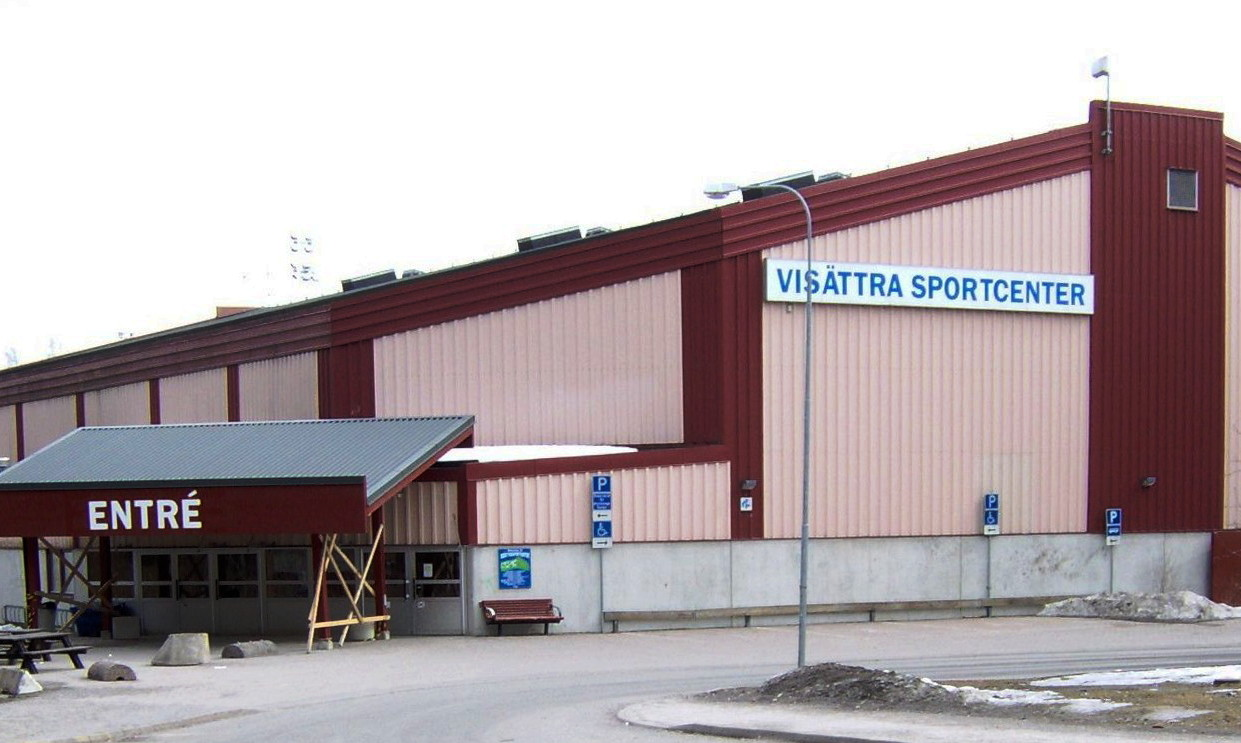
Visättra Sports Centre in April 2006

Visättra (formerly Östra Flemingsberg) is a residential area in Flemingsberg in Huddinge municipality and included in the urban area of Stockholm.
