= Patrick Grimlund =

Swedish television presenter (1972–2023)

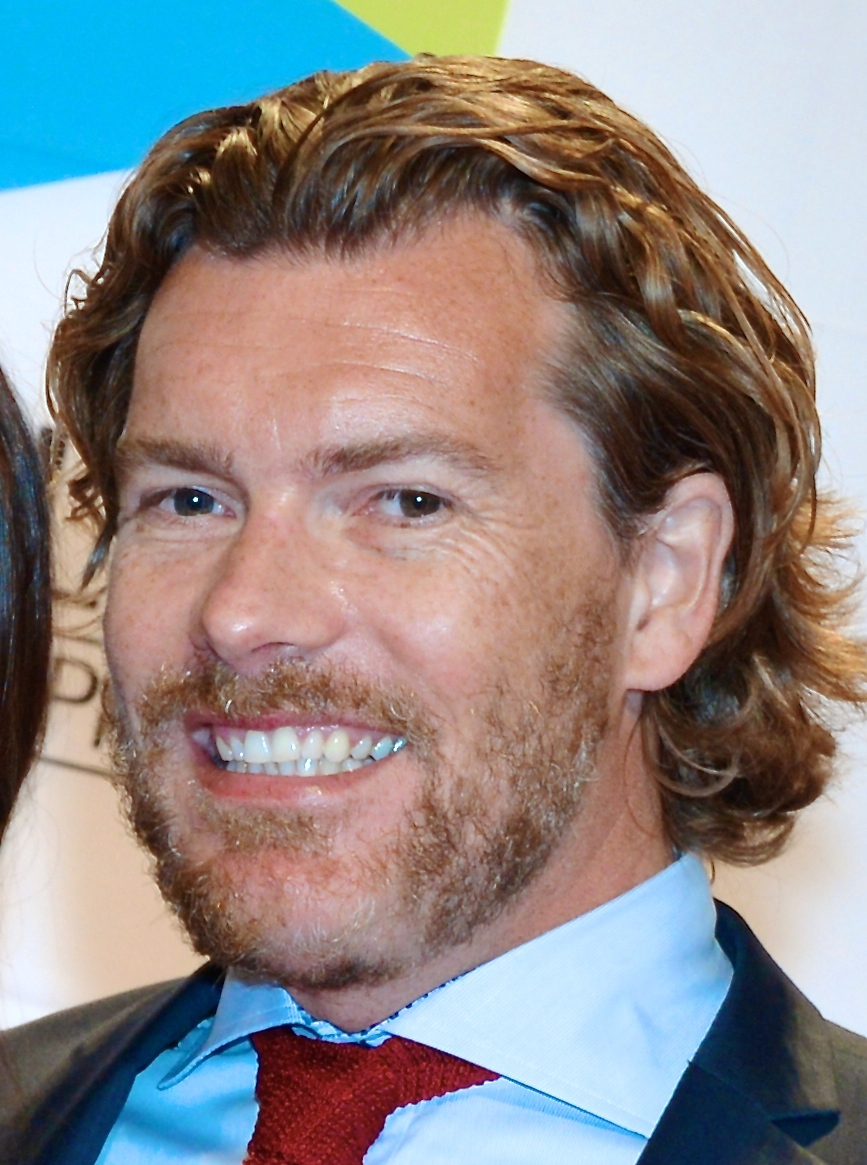
- Grimlund in 2013
- Born: Patrick Sven Grimlund; 29 May 1972; Lidingö, Sweden
- Died: 8 January 2023 (aged 50); Mariefred, Sweden
- Partner: Sara Grimlund

Patrick Sven Grimlund (29 May 1972 – 8 January 2023) was a Swedish economic advisor and television personality, best known for participating in the TV3 show Lyxfällan.

== Biography ==
=== Studies and work ===
Patrick Grimlund studied and graduated with a degree in economics at the Richmond University in London in 1997. Between 2006 and 2007, Grimlund studied at Stockholm University, and graduated with a degree in corporate economics. He focused on leadership coaching and economic advisor. In 2008, Grimlund was a writer for the Civilekonomernas magazine Civilekonomen. He was also a lecturer, for his coaching and economic advisor knowledge. In 2008, he started Grimgold consulting AB. In 2010, Grimlund was the co-founder of the company Coaching i näringslivet.

=== Television work ===
In 2010 and 2017, Patrick Grimlund was a presenter and economic advisor for the TV3 show Lyxfällan along with Magnus Hedberg. In 2015, he was the presenter for the Swedish version of Dragons Den for TV8.

In 2011, Grimlund participated as a celebrity in the cancer gala the Pink Ribbon gala broadcast on TV3. And in 2013, he was a guest on the Alex Schulman talkshow Schulman show for Aftonbladet-TV.

== Personal life and death ==
Grimlund was from 2013 and until his death married to Sara Grimlund, born Goldensohn. The couple had three children. Grimlund also had a son from a previous marriage.

Patrick Grimlund died after a car crash incident near Mariefred, on 8 January 2023, at the age of 50.
