= Skellefteå assault case =

2022 crime in Sweden

The Skellefteå assault case
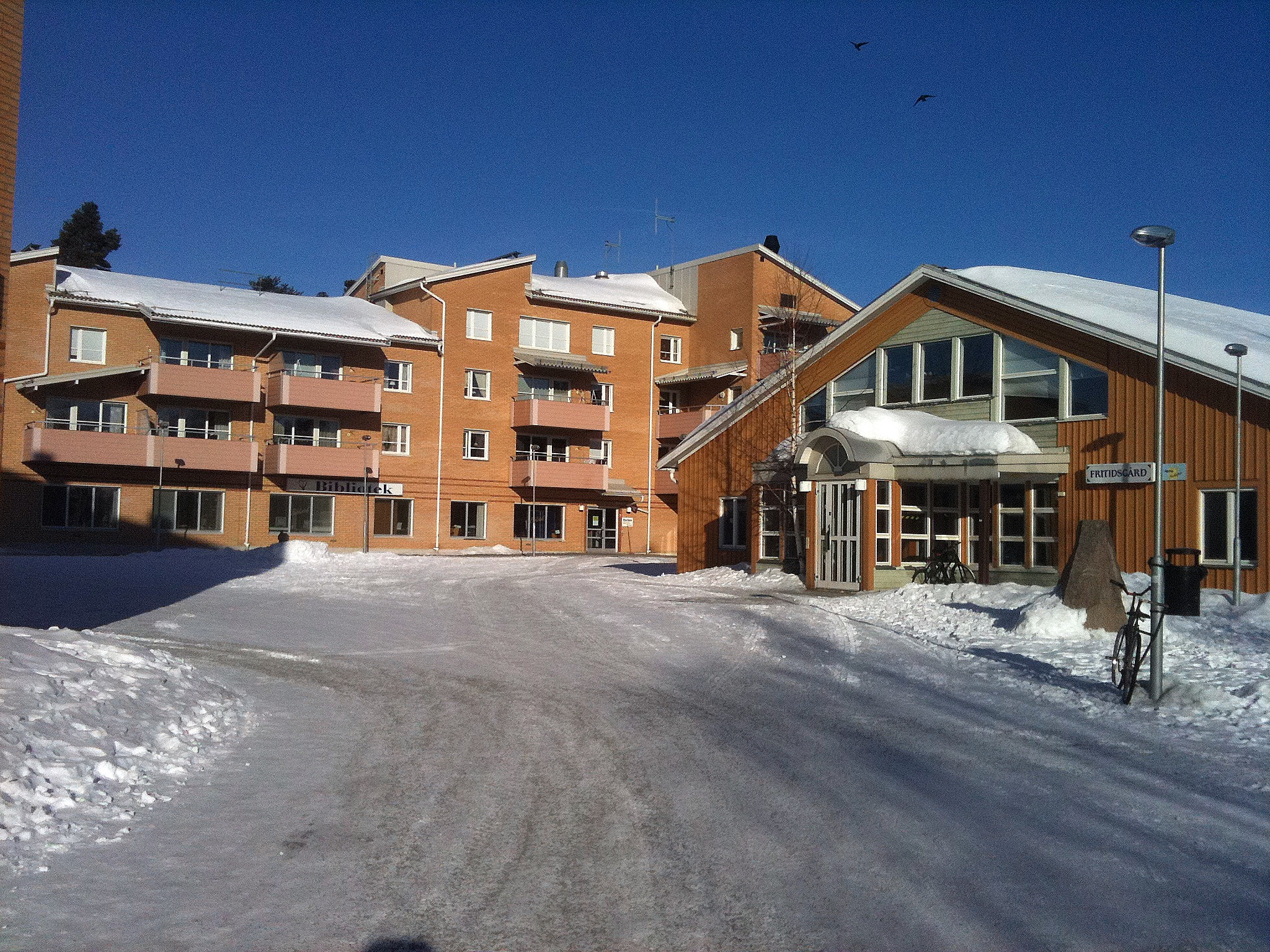
- The after-school care in Morö backe that the victim left before the assault
- Date: 7 July 2022
- Time: c.15:30
- Location: Morö Backe, Skellefteå, Sweden; 64°45′8.4″N 21°1′47.4″E
- Type: Assault, rape and attempted murder
- Motive: Presumably sexual sadism
- Perpetrator: 15-year-old Ethiopian boy
- Outcome: Review of secrecy legislation; Lex Luna Act
- Injuries: 1 (Luna)
- Trial: 12 October 2022
- Convictions: Aggravated child rape and attempted murder
- Sentence: Involuntary commitment; Ordered to pay 730,000 SEK in damages

The Skellefteå assault case (Swedish: Skellefteåfallet), also known as the Morö Backe Assault (Swedish: Överfallet på Morö Backe), was a widely publicised case in which a nine-year-old Swedish girl was raped and strangled, leaving her permanently disabled. A 15-year-old Ethiopian boy was convicted on 14 December 2022 and sentenced to involuntary commitment for aggravated child rape and attempted murder. Local newspaper Norran described the crime as one of the "darkest chapters in Skellefteå’s criminal history".

== Background ==
In 2017, there were 4,895 reported rape cases and 190 convictions in Sweden.

During the investigation and trial it appeared that the boy had been registered as nine years old when he arrived in Sweden from Ethiopia in 2018, even though both school staff and his family knew he was two years older. In 2019 the school contacted the parents because he had touched girls’ breasts and buttocks and called one of them a whore. No child-protection report was filed.

In June 2021, the boy had been investigated for attempted assault after attacking a young female cyclist in a pedestrian tunnel. As he was listed as under the age of criminal responsibility, police dropped the case and referred it to social services. The parents did not cooperate, and no information was passed on to the school. The Health and Social Care Inspectorate later judged that no errors had been committed.

The perpetrator had reportedly told teachers and school staff that he was being physically abused by his parents at home, yet this was never reported to police.

== The assault ==
On 7 July 2022 the girl, Luna, was attacked on her way home from after-school care in Morö Backe. She was found two hours later in a wooded area, severely injured.

The boy, initially registered as 13 years old, was later determined by forensic age assessment to be over 15. He was arrested the following day.

== Trial ==
Charges were filed on 30 September 2022, and the trial began on 12 October. Evidence showed that the girl had been tied to a tree and strangled using shoelaces.

A preliminary psychiatric evaluation indicated a severe mental disorder, which was confirmed by a full forensic psychiatric examination.

On 14 December 2022, he was convicted of aggravated child rape and attempted murder and sentenced to involuntary commitment with special discharge review. He was also ordered to pay the girl 730,000 SEK (c. $77,900 USD) in damages.

== Media coverage ==
Norran’s editor-in-chief Malin Christoffersson described “the difficulty of covering the inconceivable” and the challenges caused by limited access to information.

Dagens ETC reported that far-right websites spread a sedated picture of the girl and used it in anti-immigrant propaganda.

Svenska Dagbladet columnist Paulina Neuding argued that the case exemplified systemic failures in sexual-crime and migration policy.

== Aftermath ==
Following the attack, Luna and her family faced a prolonged period of recovery and adjustment. According to Swedish news sources, Luna sustained serious physical injuries and underwent multiple medical treatments, including reconstructive care and therapy for both physical and psychological trauma. The family reported that Luna continues to receive psychological support to address post-traumatic stress, anxiety, and the broader emotional impact of the crime. Her school life was disrupted, and adjustments were made to ensure a safe environment, including changes to her schooling and after-school activities.

Luna’s family has emphasized the importance of privacy and protection for her well-being. Swedish media reporting has largely respected these requests, and her identity has been consistently withheld to protect her from further public exposure.

The family has also become involved in public discussions on child protection and inter-agency communication, advocating for legislative reforms such as Lex Luna to prevent similar cases in the future.

=== Politics ===
The family criticised secrecy rules and advocated a legislative reform known as Lex Luna. Minister of Justice Gunnar Strömmer confirmed in December 2022 that an inquiry had been launched.

On 26 January 2023 Prime Minister Ulf Kristersson stated that a legislative referral would be issued, calling it “a first step toward Lex Luna”.

Government Bill 2024/25:65 was published on 29 November 2024, and the Act (2025:170) — also known as Lex Luna — entered into force on 1 April 2025.

== See also ==
- Rape of Queena Vuong
- Murder of Lisa Holm
- Rape in Sweden
