= Ingela Lind =

Swedish journalist (1943–2021)

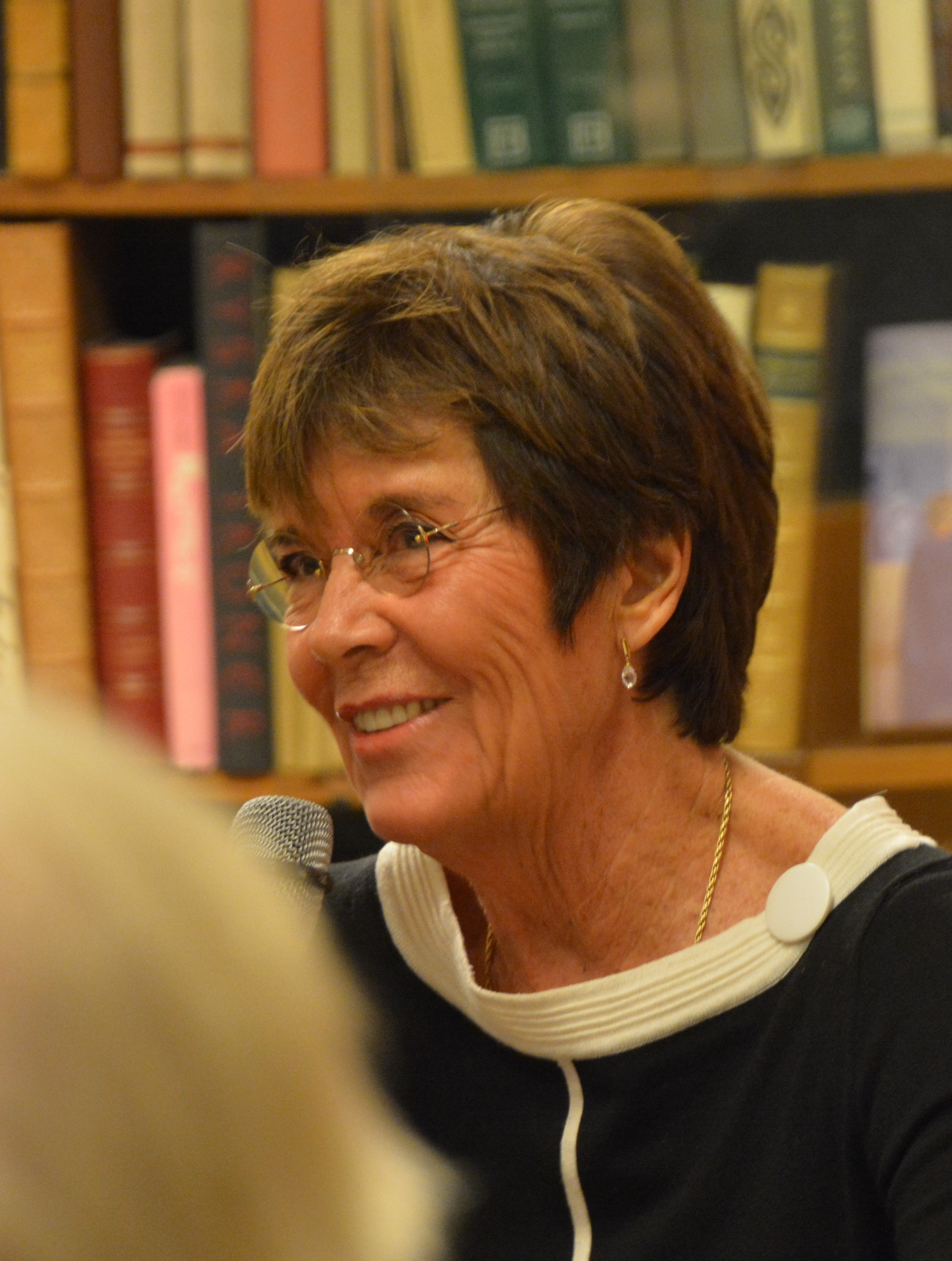
- Born: 25 February 1943
- Died: 4 April 2021 (aged 78)
- Occupations: Journalist, art critic and non-fiction writer
- Father: Hjalmar Frisell

Ingela Lind (25 February 1943 – 4 April 2021) was a Swedish journalist, art critic and non-fiction writer.

== Career ==
Lind worked as journalist and art critic for Sveriges Television, as host and writer for Bildjournalen, and for Kulturnyheterna, and was art critic for Dagens Nyheter. Her arts spanning the visual arts includes essays by artists such as the Swedish-born Danish artist, Gun Gordillo. Among her special interests were Virginia Woolf and the Bloomsbury Group, about which she wrote two books, Leka med modernismen from 2008, and Ta sig frihet. Bloomsbury, Indien och konsten att leva from 2018.

She died on 4 April 2021, 78 years old.

== Selected works ==
- Chatchai Puipia : plasticien. Les carnets de la création : Thaïlande. Translated by Sally Laruelle. Montreuil: Éd. de l'Oeil. 2002. ISBN 9782912415349. OCLC 470101902.
- Leka med modernismen : Virginia Woolf och Bloomsbury-gruppen. Stockholm: Bonnier. 2008. ISBN 9789100120870. OCLC 262018994.
- Blod i salongerna : om sex, primitivism och längtan efter det naturliga. Stockholm: Atlantis. 2014. ISBN 9789173536714. OCLC 882072936.
