= Björn Natthiko Lindeblad =

Swedish Buddhist monk and economist. (1961–2022)

Personal life
- Born: Björn Knut Valdemar Lindeblad; 16 August 1961
- Died: 17 January 2022 (aged 60)
- Notable work: Jag kan ha fel och andra visdomar från mitt liv som buddhistmunk
- Education: Stockholm School of Economics
- Occupation: Economist

Religious life
- Religion: Buddhism
- Monastic name: Natthiko Bhikku

Björn Natthiko Lindeblad (Buddhist name Natthiko Bhikku, 16 August 1961 – 17 January 2022) was a Swedish economist, lecturer, and Buddhist monk.

== Biography ==
Natthiko Lindeblad was born on 16 August 1961. He had a master's degree in economics from the Stockholm School of Economics and began working in the mid-1980s as deputy finance manager for AGA AB in Spain. As he did not like the job, he started to work in a preschool, and studied literary studies. He was also a substitute teacher, and worked for a year as an economist for the United Nations in India.

Natthiko Lindeblad became interested in meditation and Buddhism before and during his year in India, and in January 1992, he applied to Wat Pah Nanachat, a poor forest monastery in northeastern Thailand, and became a monk named Natthiko Bhikkhu. The monastery served as a spiritual inn with many guests from Thailand and abroad, and Lindeblad appreciated the environment and the community. In October 2008, Lindeblad decided to leave the monastery and return to Sweden to lead retreats for meditation and give lectures.

In 2012, Natthiko Lindeblad was chosen to be the listeners' summer host in the popular Swedish radio show Sommar. He then became successful in leading guided meditations, retreats and business leadership programs. In September 2018, Lindeblad was diagnosed with ALS, which in various ways affected his continued lecturing activities.

In 2020, he released the book Jag kan ha fel och andra visdomar från mitt liv som buddhistmunk. The English translation of the book, titled I May Be Wrong And Other Wisdoms from Life as a Forest Monk, was released on 17 February 2022.

On 17 January 2022, Lindeblad died of euthanasia at the age of 60, surrounded by his loved ones. He was married to Elisabeth Lagerqvist.

== Bibliography ==
- Natthiko Lindeblad, Björn; Bankler, Caroline; Modiri, Navid (2020). Jag kan ha fel och andra visdomar från mitt liv som buddhistmunk (in Swedish). Stockholm: Bonnier Fakta. ISBN 978-91-7887-186-5.
- Natthiko Lindeblad, Björn (2022). I May Be Wrong. Bloomsbury. ISBN 978-1-5266-4481-7.
