= Byggnadsarbetaren =

Swedish magazine

Byggnadsarbetaren (Swedish: Construction Workers) is the official magazine of the builders union, Byggnads. The magazine was established in 1949. It is based in Stockholm, Sweden. As of 2015 Kenneth Pettersson was the editor-in-chief of the magazine. Byggnadsarbetaren was published eight times a year. In 2017 it came out 14 times per year and was redesigned.

In 2012 the circulation of Byggnadsarbetaren was 108,300 copies. It was 105,000 copies in 2017.
