= Morö Backe =

Town in northern Sweden

Coordinates: 64.75230°N 21.02819°E

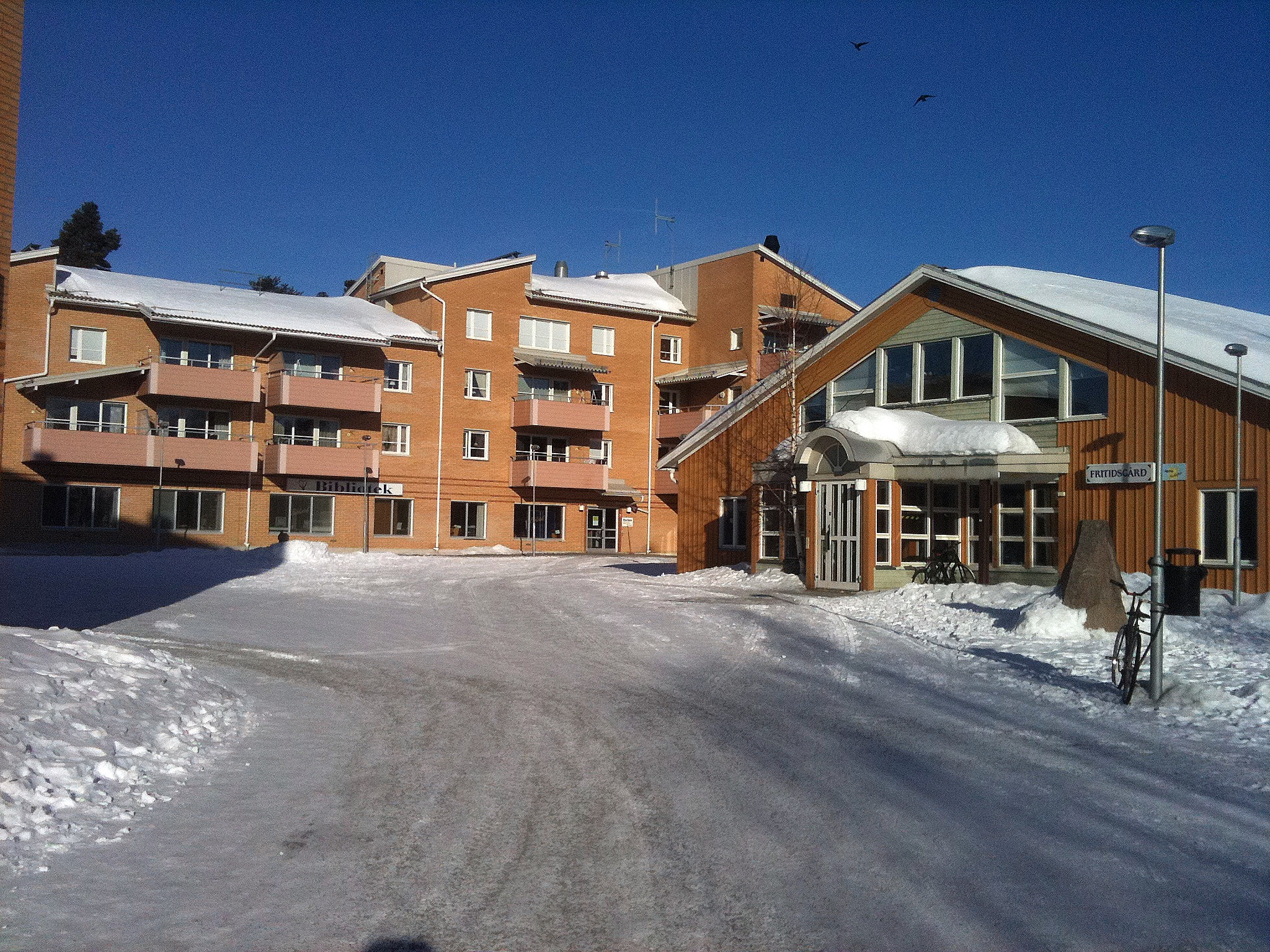
Morö Backe

Morö Backe is a town in northern Sweden in the northeastern part of the district of Skellefteå. The town is located mostly in the Skellefteå River on the eastern slope of Vitberget, situated cliff-top. The current population is approximately 3,000.

Morö Backe is a major center for outdoor activities, and offers cross-country and downhill skiing. It is Skellefteå's largest residential area, with a high percentage of its settlements dating from the 1970s and 1980s. In the 1990s, additional homes were built in the eastern part of the town; from 1989–1991, rental apartments and condominiums were built in the town center.

Morö Backe has several preschools and one primary school with c. 360 students. The area has its own medical center that coordinates with the health center in Kåge; several football fields where Morön BK plays and practices; and a riding school for the Skelleftea Riding Club.

The Morö Backe town square has a Thai restaurant and MB Livs. A co-op supermarket closed in 2006, as did a hairdresser and bank. The Skellefteå municipality plans to build a new nursing home on the lot, according to development plans, and has inaugurated a new retail park.

Streets and neighborhoods in Morö Backe are mostly named after weather events, and summer and winter activities.

Morö Backe was the location of the Skellefteå assault case.
