= Sten Elliot =

Swedish sailor (1925–2022)

Sten Elliot (24 December 1925 – 16 January 2022) was a Swedish sailor who competed in the 1960 Summer Olympics. He was born in Gothenburg on 24 December 1925, and died on 16 January 2022, at the age of 96.
