= Ebba Andersson (footballer) =

Swedish footballer (1935–2021)

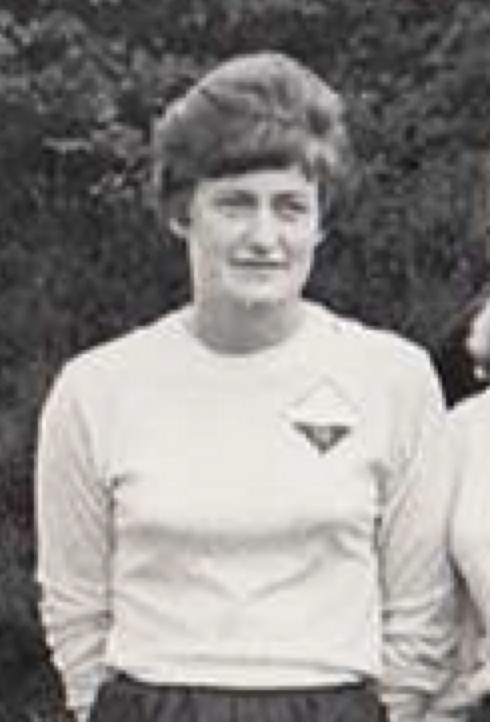
- Andersson with Öxabäcks IF in 1968.

Personal information
- Date of birth: 1 December 1935
- Place of birth: Sweden
- Date of death: 19 February 2021 (aged 85)
- Place of death: Sweden

Senior career*
Years	Team	Apps	(Gls)
- Öxabäck

International career
- Sweden
- * Club domestic league appearances and goals

Ebba Andersson (1 December 1935 – 19 February 2021) was a Swedish women's footballer who captained the national team.
