= Vrak – Museum of Wrecks =

Maritime archaeological museum in Stockholm

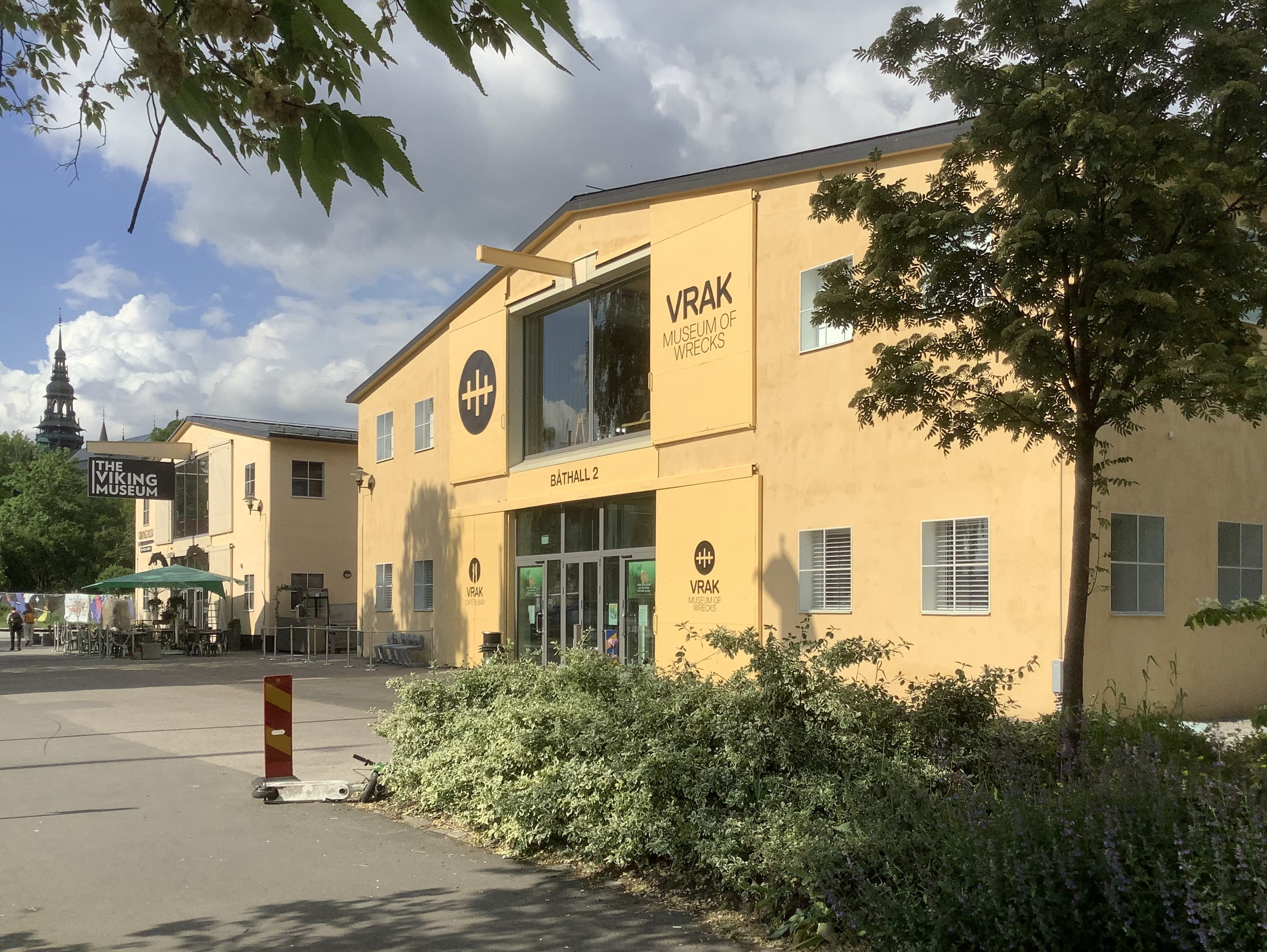
- Location: Sweden
- Coordinates: 59°19′35″N 18°05′42″E
- Website: https://www.vrak.se/en/
- Location of Vrak – Museum of Wrecks

The Vrak – Museum of Wrecks is a Swedish museum of maritime archeology in Stockholm in Sweden. It is managed by the Maritime Museum in Stockholm and was opened in September 2021 in Boat hangar No 2 at Galärvarvet (Galley Shipyard) at Djurgården.

== Operations ==
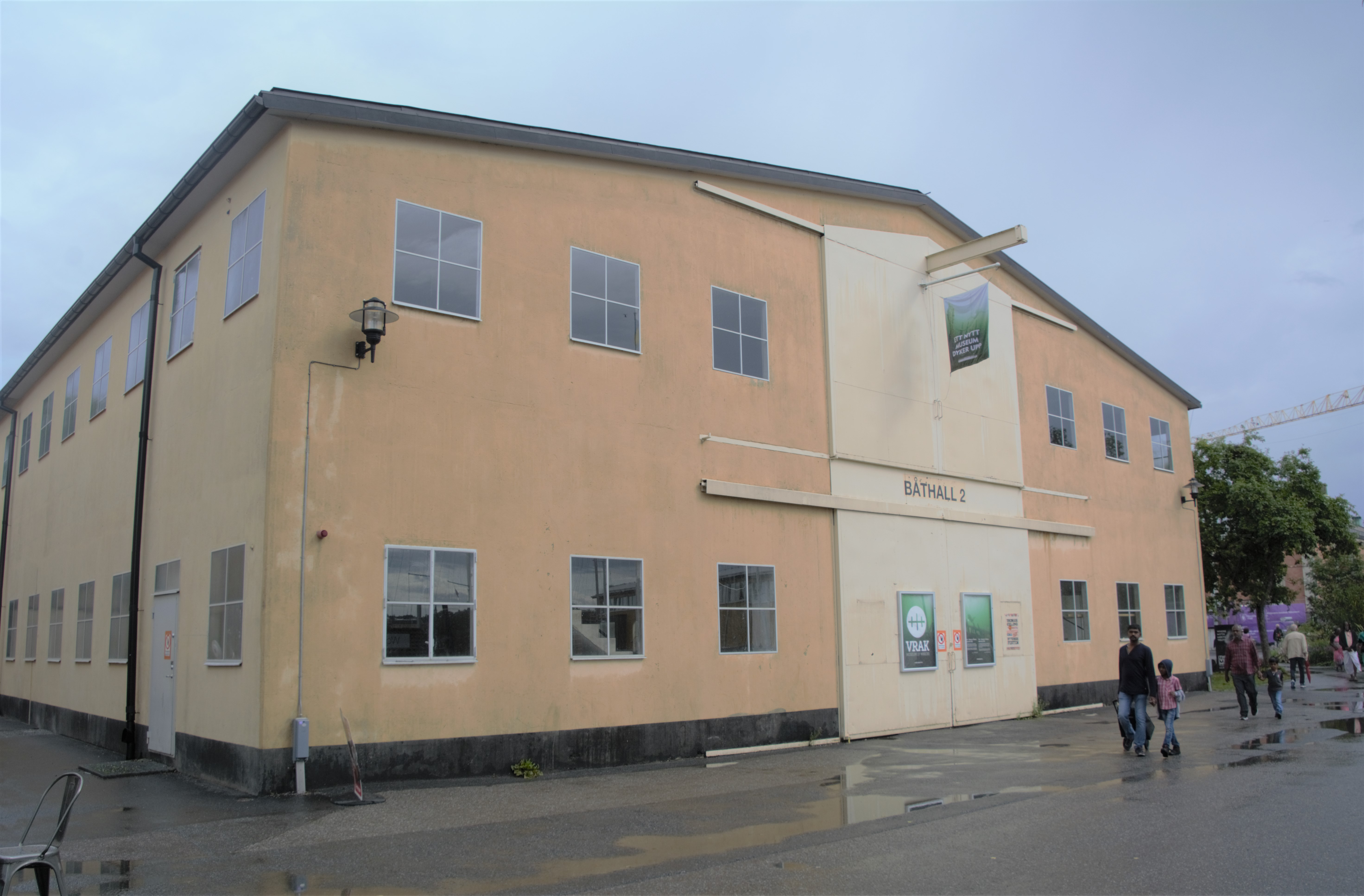
Boat hangar No 2, 2019

The project is planned by the Maritime Museum in cooperation with the Marine Archeology Institute of the Södertörn University, Maris.

The Museum of Wrecks shows the Baltic Sea cultural heritage, especially some of the almost one hundred identified old shipwrecks at the bottom of the sea.
