= 2021 Gothenburg explosion =

Explosion in Gothenburg, Sweden

In the early morning of 28 September 2021, an explosion took place in an apartment building containing 140 apartments, in Annedal, Gothenburg, Sweden.

Twenty-five people were taken to hospital, four of them with serious injuries. One person died of her injuries, two weeks after the explosion.

A man in his 50s, who lived in the building, was suspected of having caused the explosion, and he was remanded in his absence. On 6 October, he was found dead in the Göta älv river. The suspect lived in the apartment complex and was involved in an eviction case.
