= National Day of Sweden =

National holiday in Sweden

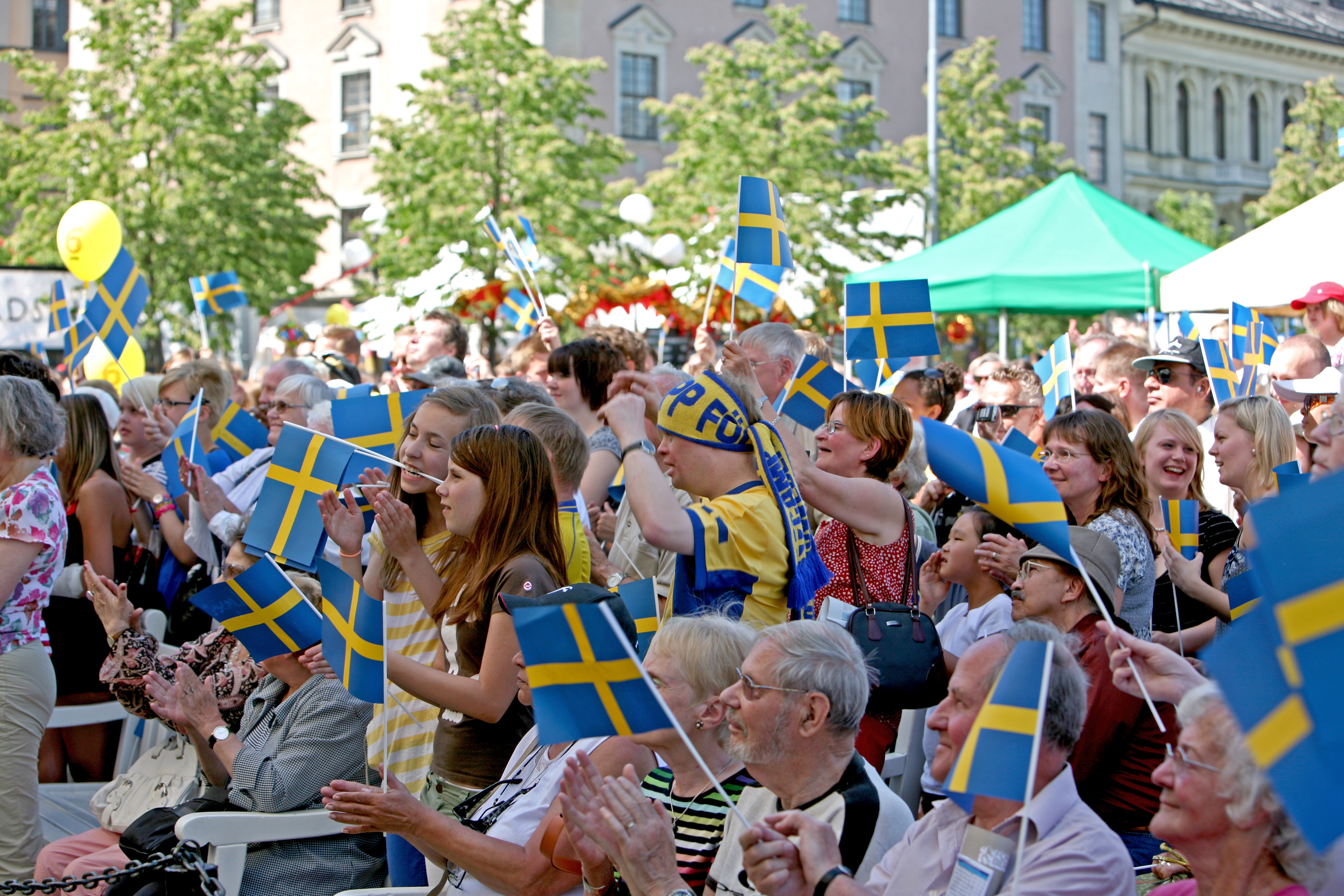
- National Day celebrations at Kungsträdgården in Stockholm, 2008
- Official name: Sveriges nationaldag
- Observed by: Sweden
- Type: National Day
- Date: 6 June
- Next time: 6 June 2027
- Frequency: annual

The National Day of Sweden (Swedish: Sveriges nationaldag [ˈsvæ̌rjɛs natɧʊˈnɑ̂ːldɑːɡ]) is observed annually as a public holiday on 6 June. Prior to 1983, the day was celebrated only as the Swedish Flag Day (Swedish: Svenska flaggans dag). It was officially named the Swedish National Day by the Swedish parliament in 1983, and became a public holiday in 2005. The day is celebrated in honor of the election of Gustav Vasa as King of Sweden in 1523 and of the adoption of the constitutions of 1809 and 1974.

== History ==
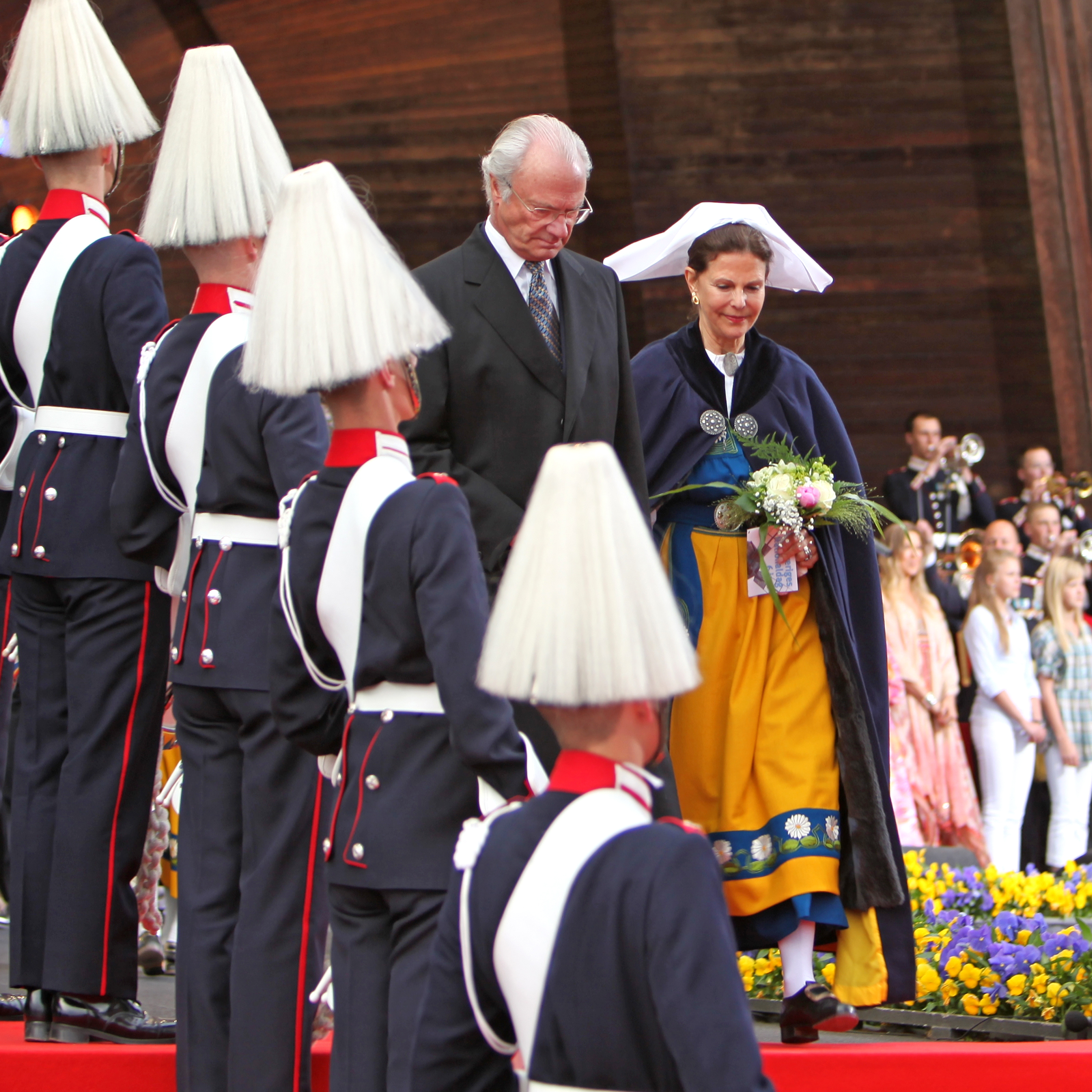
King Carl XVI Gustaf and Queen Silvia at Skansen in 2009

The tradition of celebrating this date began in 1916 at the Stockholm Olympic Stadium, in honor of the election of King Gustav Vasa on 6 June 1523 (according to the Julian calendar). Some question the validity of this date as a national holiday, as the event occurred so long ago that it does not have as strong a presence in the social consciousness.

In 2005, it became an official Swedish public holiday, replacing Whit Monday. This change led to fewer days off from work (i.e. more working days) as 6 June will periodically fall on the weekend, unlike Whit Monday, which was always celebrated on a Monday. Among newer traditions that have emerged since National Day became a holiday is an invitation from the King to the public to visit large parts of Stockholm Palace all day without the usual entry fees.

== Image gallery ==
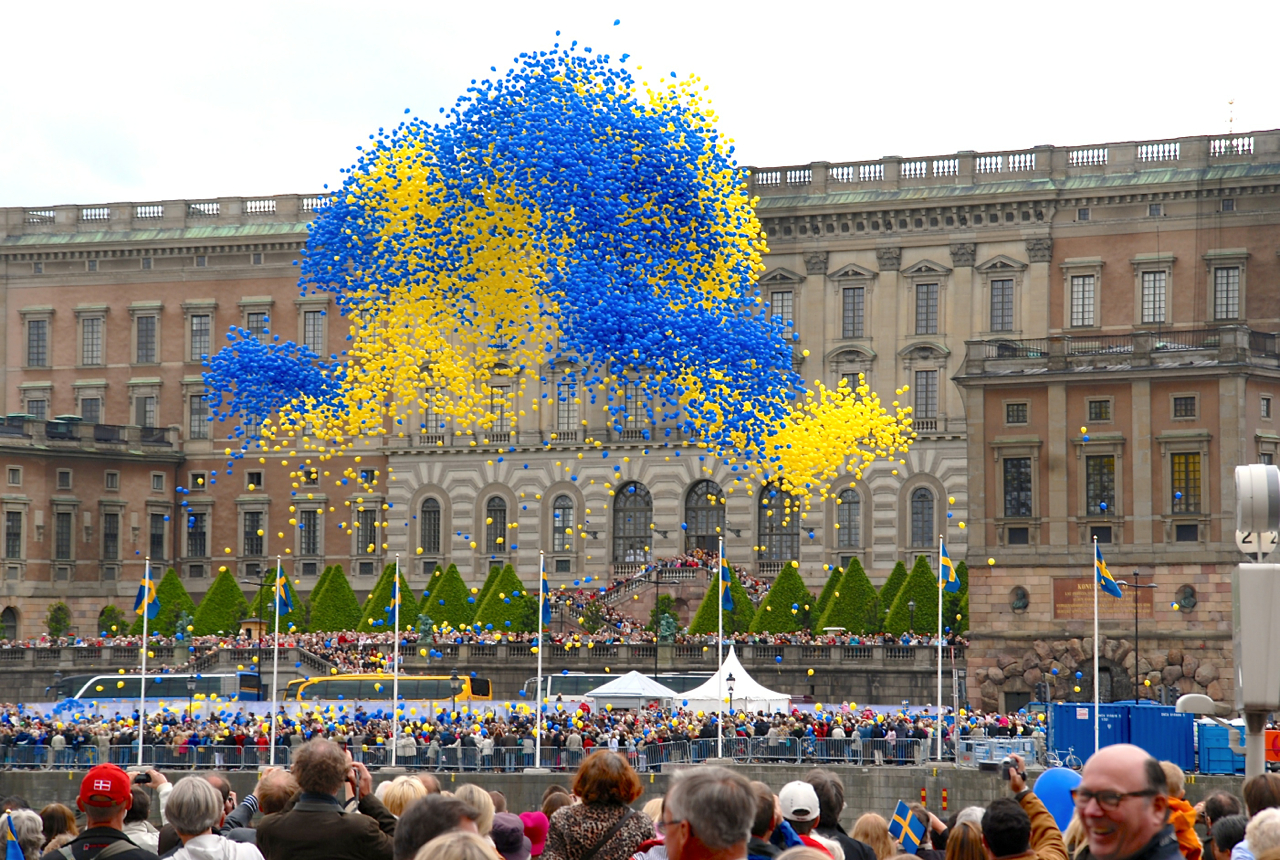
National Day Celebration at Stockholm Palace, 2009

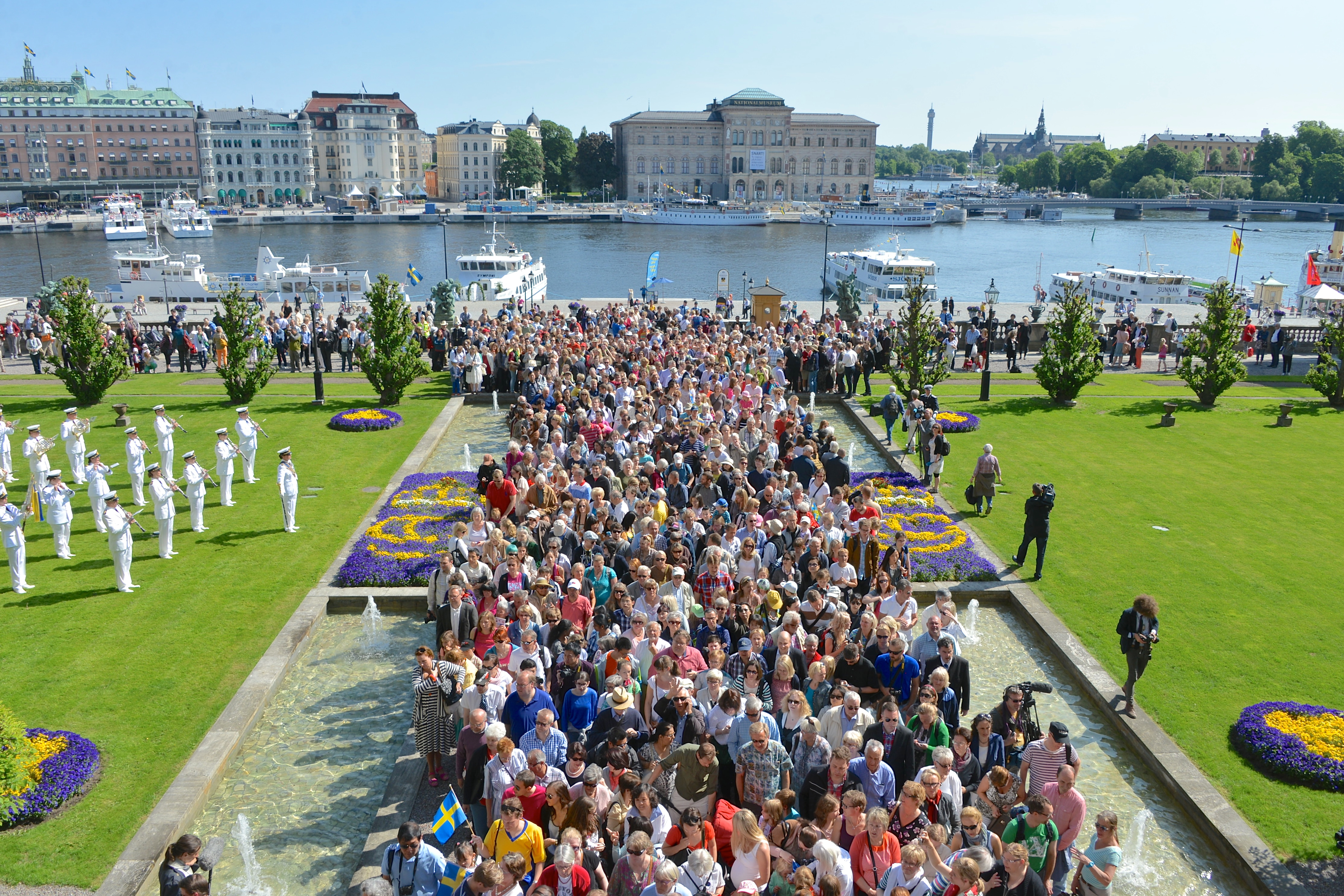
Entrance to Stockholm Palace, 2013

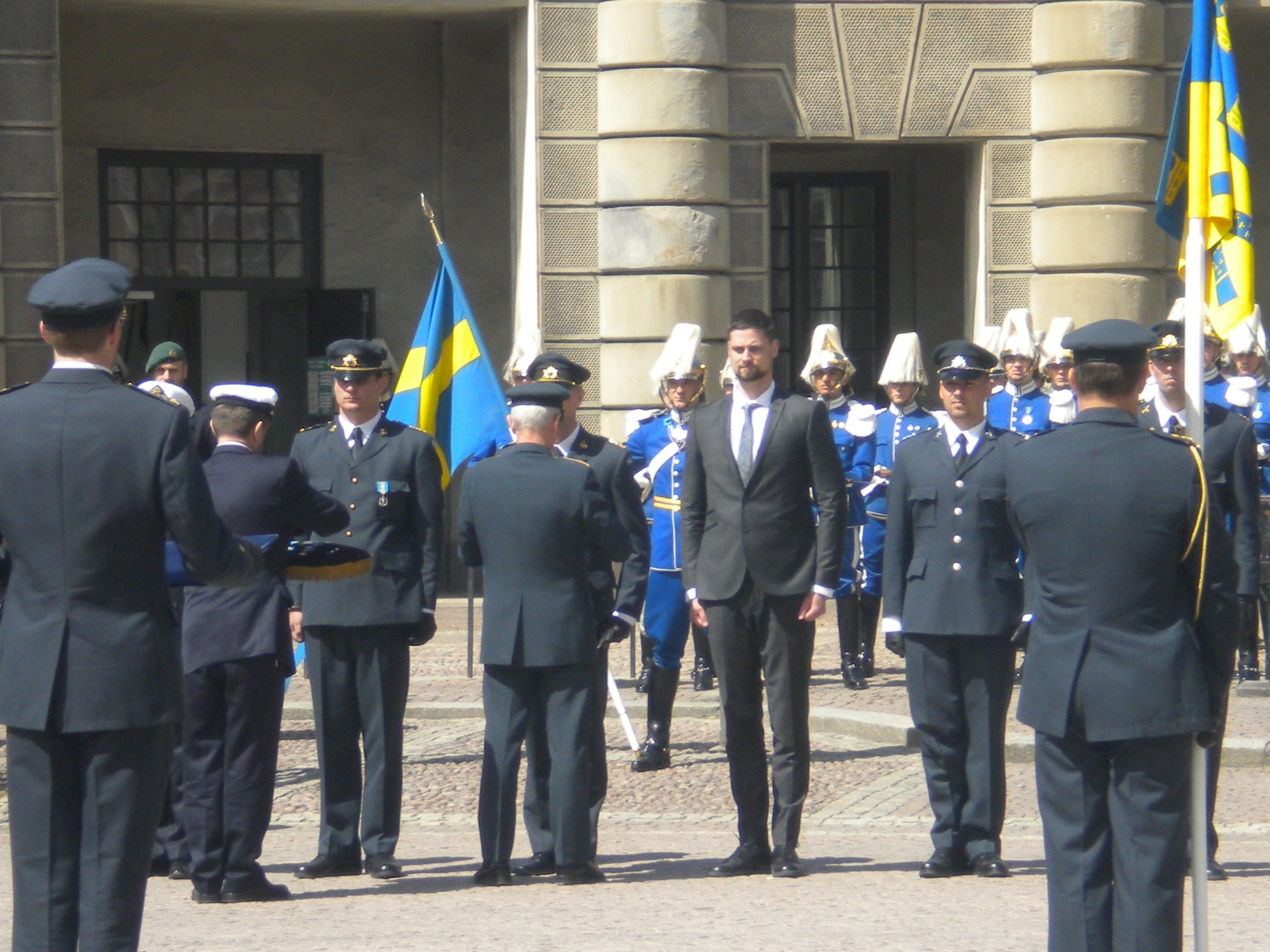
Swedish UN soldiers awarded medals on National Day, 2012

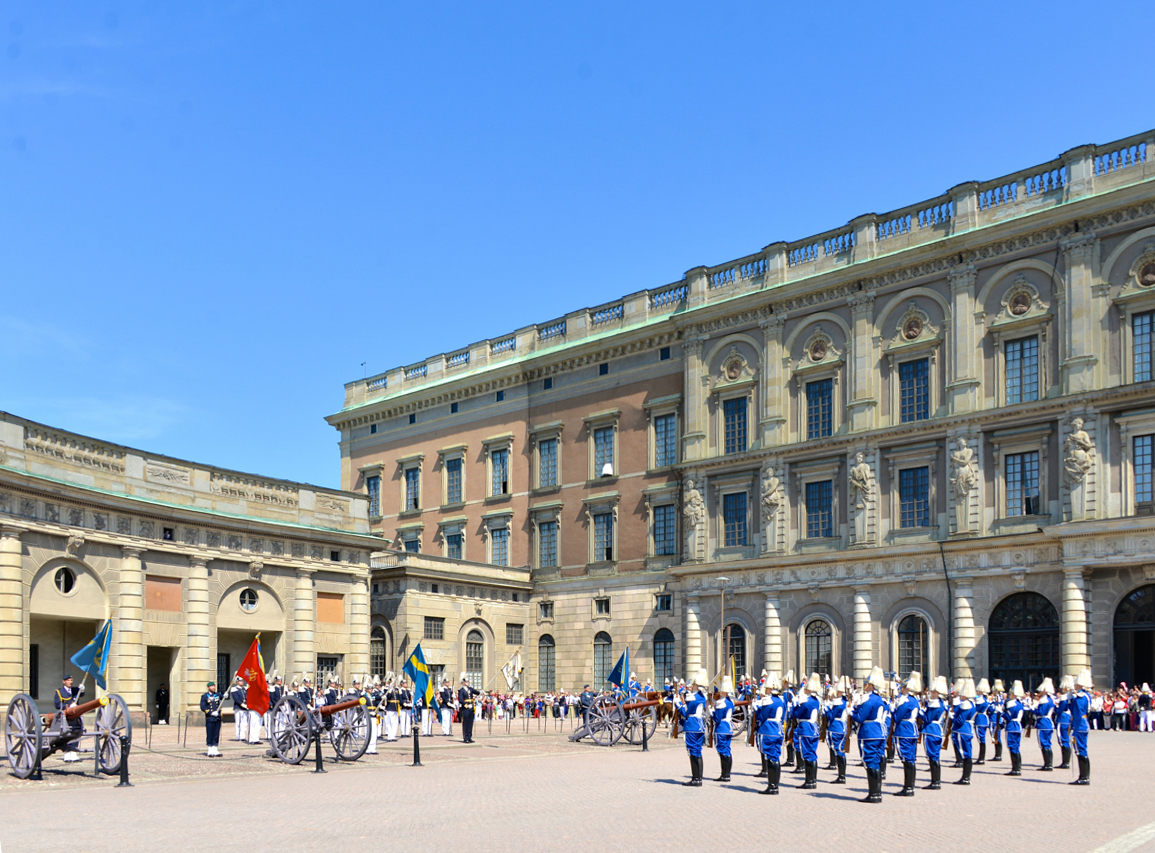
National Day Celebration at Stockholm Palace outer court, 2013

== See also ==
- "Du gamla, du fria" – national anthem of Sweden
- Flag flying days in Sweden – calendar days designated as official flag flying days in the country
- Mother Svea – patriotic emblem of the Swedish nation
- Three Crowns – national emblem of Sweden
