= 1867 in Sweden =

- Decades: 1840s; 1850s; 1860s; 1870s; 1880s
- See also: Other events of 1867; Timeline of Swedish history

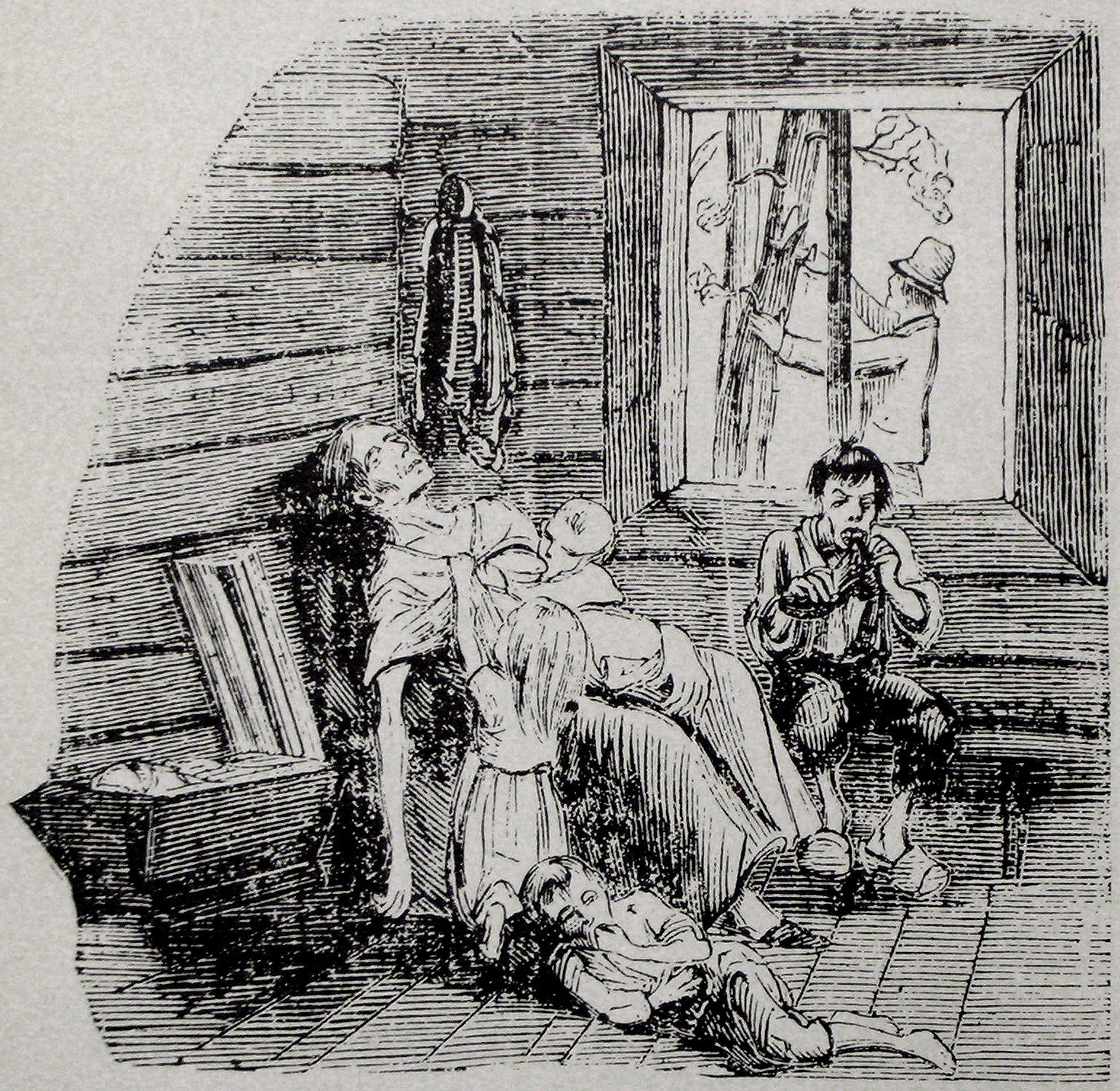
Illustration of starvation in northern Sweden, Famine of 1866–1868

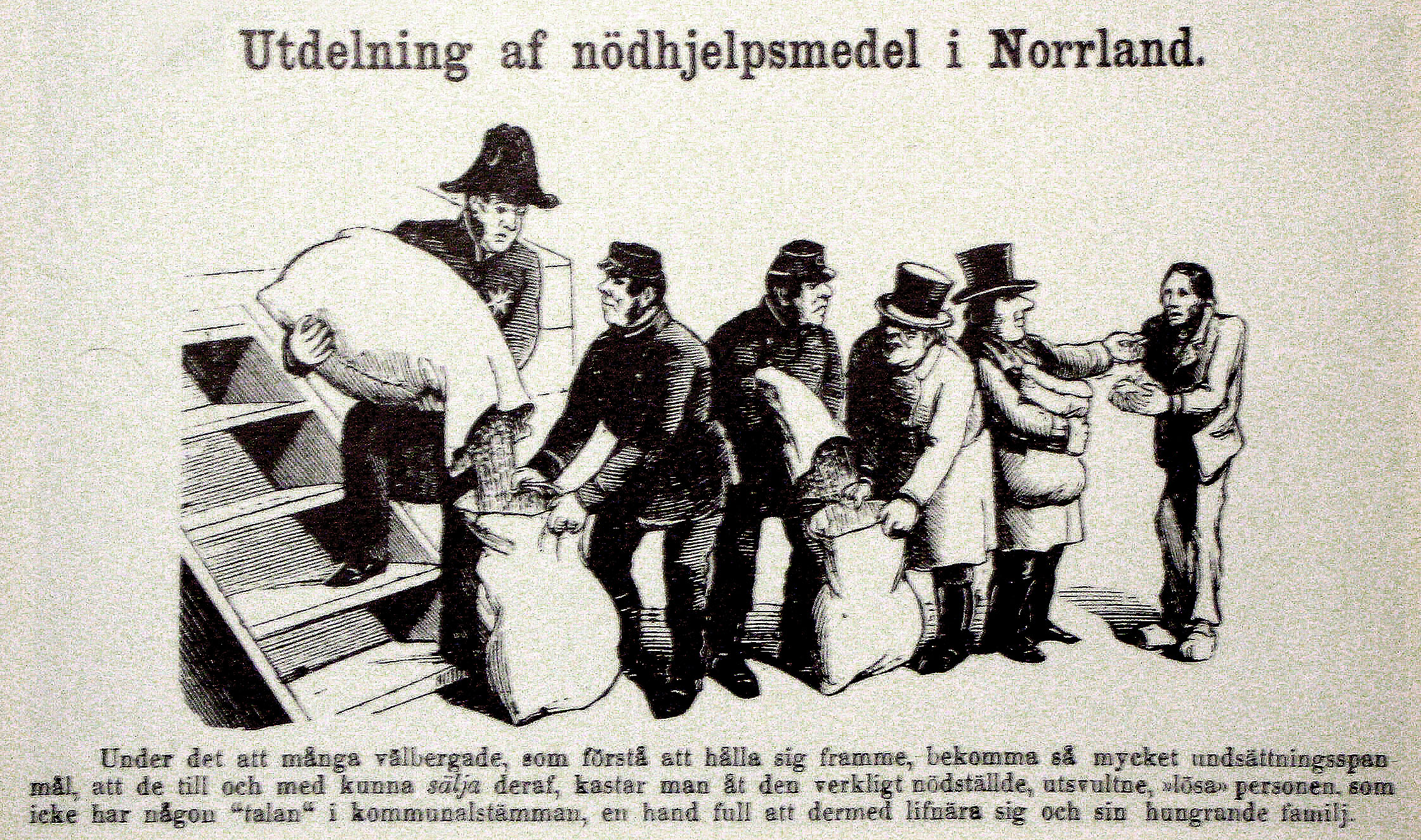
Caricature from the paper Fäderneslandet 14 December 1867, criticizing the unjust distribution of the relief help committees: the relief help are given first to county governor, and are thereafter given first to the wealthy officials and rich farmers and last, when only an handful is left, to the poor people truly in need.

Events from the year 1867 in Sweden

== Incumbents ==
- Monarch – Charles XV

== Events ==
- 1 August - Inauguration of the new Uppsala University Hospital.
- The Lantmanna Party is created.
- Emmy Rappe becomes head nurse in the newly established Surgical Clinic at the Uppsala Academic Hospital, where she opened the first professional training courses for nurses in Sweden.
- The great Swedish famine of 1867-1869 spreads from Finland to Sweden, where it lasts until 1868. This is the last famine to take place in Sweden.
- The scandal of the great bankruptcy of the heiress Louise von Fersen (1816–1879) attracts attention.
- The great Swedish emigration to the United States begun, in part caused by the great famine.
- Helsingborgs Dagblad is founded.
- Augusta Lundin open her fashion studio in Stockholm.

== Births ==
- 27 February – Wilhelm Peterson-Berger, composer (died 1942)
- 26 September – Anna Paues, philologist (died 1945)
- 30 September – Gulli Petrini, physicist, women's right activist and politician (died 1941)
- 13 December – Jenny Brandt, ballerina (died 1933)
- Ebba De la Gardie, reporter (died 1928)

== Deaths ==
- 4 January – Marianne Ehrenström, artist (born 1773)
- 3 October
  - Hedda Hjortsberg, ballerina (born 1777)
  - Thora Thersner, artist (born 1818)
- Anna Göransdotter, textile artist (born 1797)
- Lovisa Mathilda Nettelbladt, writer (born 1814)
