= 1857 in Sweden =

- Decades: 1830s; 1840s; 1850s; 1860s; 1870s
- See also: Other events of 1857; Timeline of Swedish history

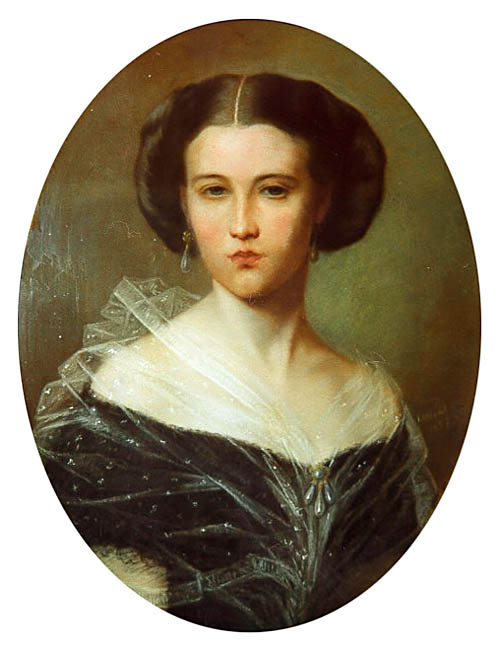
Cardon Ida

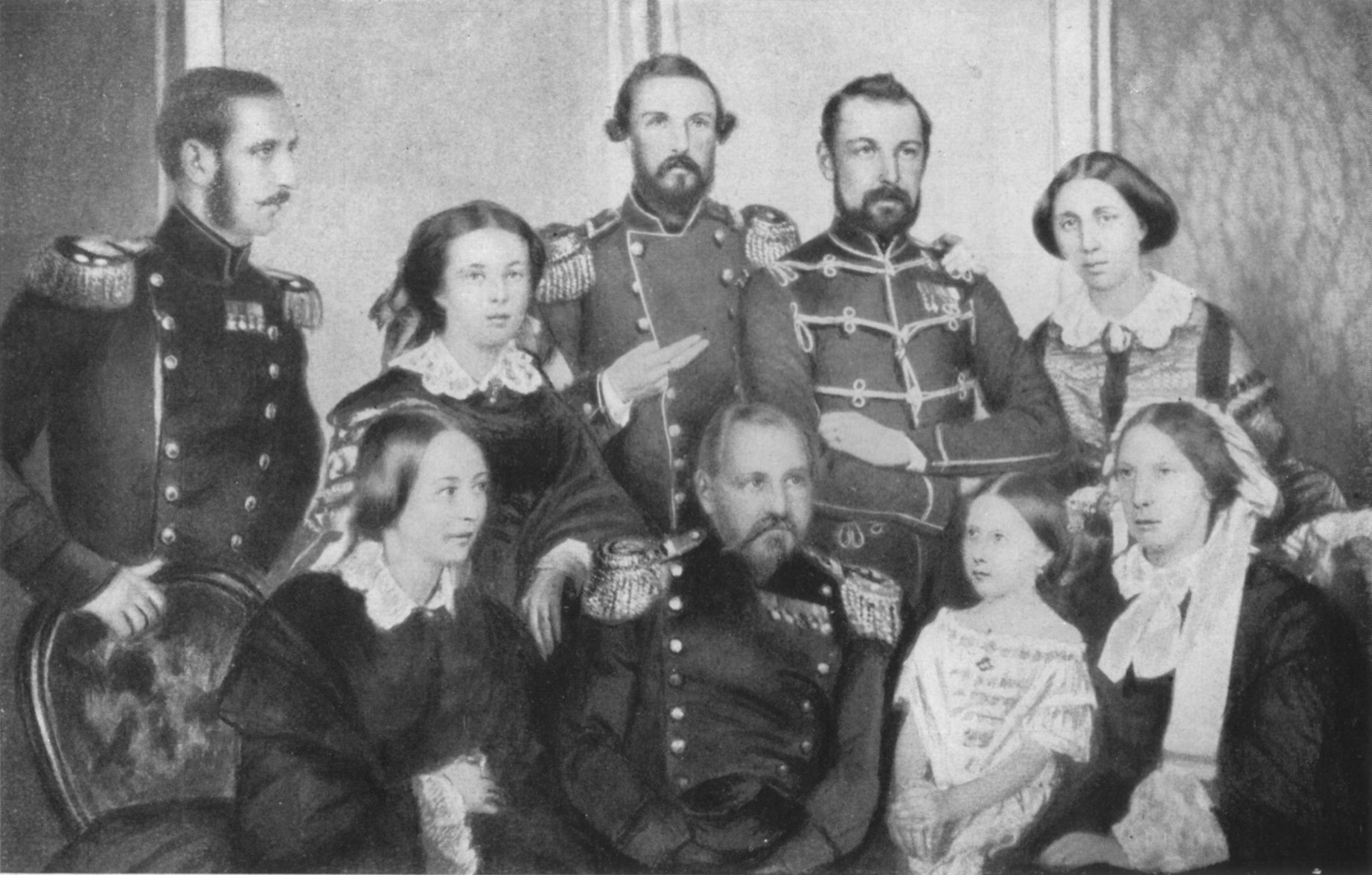
Royal house of Sweden 1857

Events from the year 1857 in Sweden

== Incumbents ==
- Monarch – Oscar I

== Events ==
- 6 June – Wedding between Prince Oscar and Sophie of Nassau.
- 12 June – Elfrida Andrée becomes the first female organist in Sweden.
- 6 October - Establishment of Swedish consulate in Bombay, India (now Mumbai).
- A regulation of Gamla stan is proposed by A. E. Schuldheis and discussed in the parliament. Gets rejected two years later.
- An interim Swedish-Norwegian government is formed in Stockholm due to the King's deteriorating health.
- The artist Johan Fredrik Höckert's painting Det inre af en lappkåta received a special honourable mention at the Paris Salon. The artwork was acquired by the Swedish Government to display at the National Museum of Fine Arts in Stockholm.
- Several protests for higher pay in Sweden's iron and steel factories.
- Devastating fire in the Mosebacke area in Stockholm leads to significant damage to property.

== Births ==
- 13 March – Hilda Sachs, journalist and women's rights activist (died 1935)
- 21 April – Elisabet Anrep-Nordin, pedagogue (died 1947)
- 27 October – Ernst Trygger, professor and politician (died 1943)
- Amanda Horney, politician (Social Democrat), trade unionist and women's right activist (died 1953)

== Deaths ==
- 9 January – Carl Wilhelm Nordgren, painter (born 1804)
- 2 April – Jeanette Granberg, playwright (born 1825)
- – Halta-Kajsa, tradition bearer (born 1792)
- – Anna Ehrenström, poet ( born 1786)
