= 1930 in Sweden =

- Decades: 1910s; 1920s; 1930s; 1940s; 1950s
- See also: Other events of 1930; Timeline of Swedish history

Events from the year 1930 in Sweden

== Incumbents ==
- Monarch – Gustaf V
- Prime Minister – Arvid Lindman, Carl Gustaf Ekman

== Events ==
- 25 November – The Swedish Handball Federation is founded of the Swedish Game Association.

== Births ==
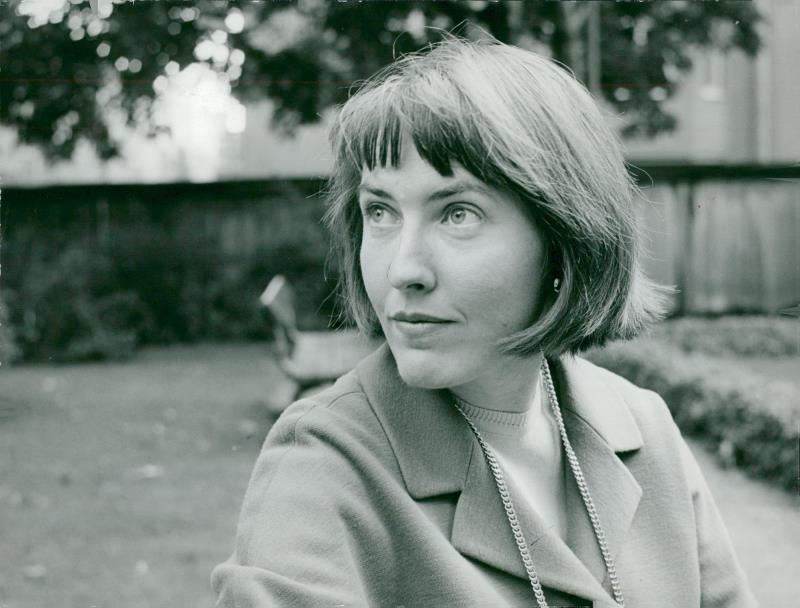
Margareta Ekström.

- 11 January – Björn von der Esch, politician (died 2010).
- 23 April – Margareta Ekström, writer.
- 17 July – Sigvard Ericsson, speed-skater.
- 15 October – Ingemar Mundebo, politician (died 2018)
- 18 November – Sonja Edström, cross country skier.

== Deaths ==
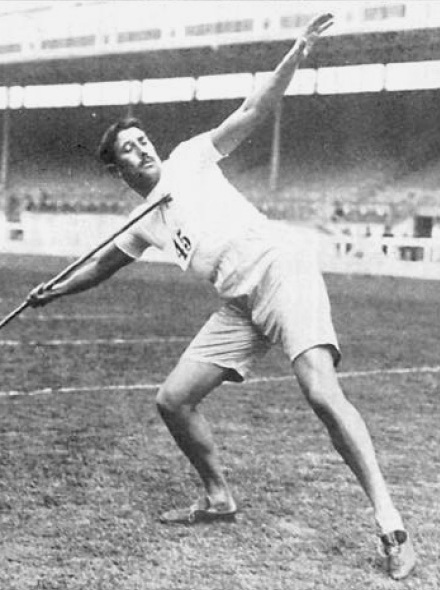
Eric Lemming was Olympic champion in javelin throw.

- 14 May – Erik Algot Fredriksson, tug-of-war competitor, Olympic champion (born 1885) .
- 5 June – Eric Lemming, athlete (born 1880) .
- 15 June – Anna Whitlock, reform pedagogue, journalist, suffragette and feminist (born 1852)
- 12 July - Lotten Edholm, composer and a pioneer within the Swedish Red Cross (born 1839)
- 25 July - Wilhelmina von Hallwyl, art collector (born 1844)
- Undated -
  - Joël Blomqvist, hymnwriter (born 1840)
  - Helene Taube, courtier (born 1860)
