= 1929 in Sweden =

- Decades: 1900s; 1910s; 1920s; 1930s; 1940s
- See also: Other events of 1929; Timeline of Swedish history

Events from the year 1929 in Sweden

== Incumbents ==
- Monarch – Gustaf V
- Prime Minister – Arvid Lindman

== Events ==
- The newspaper Arbetar-Tidningen established

== Births ==
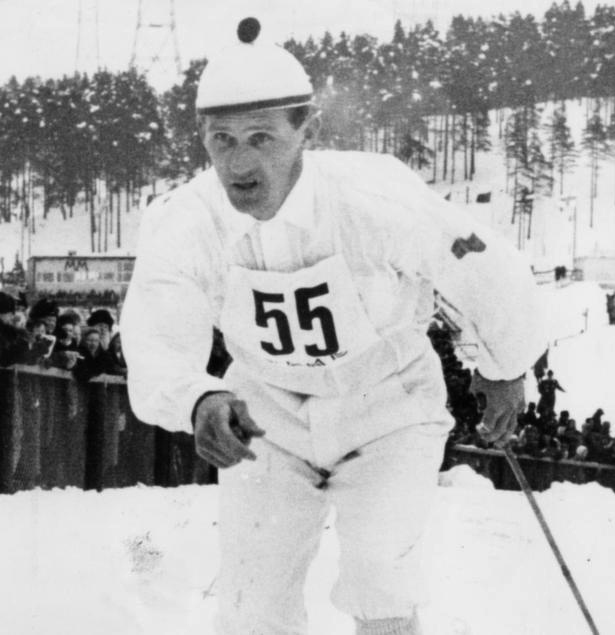
Sixten Jernberg, World champion and Olympic champion in cross country skiing.

- 24 January – Anders Kvissberg, sport shooter.
- 28 January – Vanja Blomberg, gymnast.
- 6 February – Sixten Jernberg, cross country skier (died 2012).
- 10 April – Max von Sydow, actor
- 14 May – Åke Ortmark, radio journalist, author and television presenter (died 2018)
- 29 June – Bertil Norman, orienteering competitor
- 21 July – Birger Asplund, hammer thrower
- 12 August – Carl Axel Petri, politician and judge (died 2017)
- 4 September – Bror Stefenson, Swedish Navy admiral (died 2018)
- 6 October – Karin Lindberg, gymnast.

== Deaths ==
- 11 January – Elfrida Andrée, first female organist (born 1841)
- 21 June – Birger Sjöberg, novelist, poet and songwriter (born 1885)
- Augusta Braunerhjelm, playwright (born 1839)
- Ottilia Littmarck, actress (born 1834)
- 6 September - Anna Pettersson, lawyer (born 1861)
