= 1852 in Sweden =

- Decades: 1830s; 1840s; 1850s; 1860s; 1870s
- See also: Other events of 1852; Timeline of Swedish history

Events from the year 1852 in Sweden

== Incumbents ==
- Monarch – Oscar I

== Events ==
- 3 April – Henrik Reuterdahl is appointed the Minister of Education and Ecclesiastical Affairs.
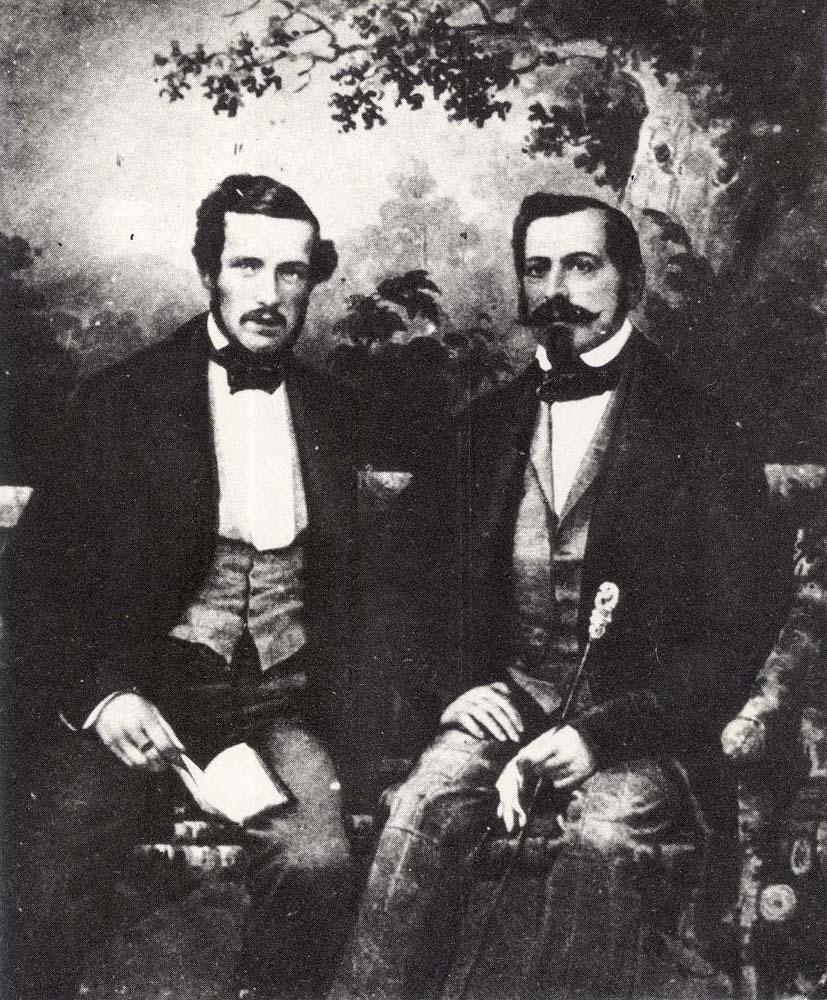
- Prince Gustaf and King Oscar I pictured in 1852. Gustaf would go on to die that same year in Norway.
  8 May – Sweden signs the London Protocol, an international treaty that seeks to resolve Denmark's territorial integrity.
- 4 October – Sweden and Finland 'skip' 10 days in order to align with the spring equinox according to the Gregorian calendar.
- Amalia Assur becomes the first female dentist in Sweden.
- The manufacturer Hästens is established.
- Kungsportsplatsen is inaugurated.
- Sophia Posse takes over the girls' school Hammarstedtska skolan.
- The Factory and Handicrafts Ordinance of 1846 is amended to prohibit night work for labourers under the age of 18.
- Academic jurisdiction, formerly permitting universities to rule as courts over their students and faculty, is abolished.
- Knappfors Lock in the Bergslagen Canal is completed, connecting Karlskoga and Bofors to Sjöändan.

== Births ==
- 25 April – Fritz Eckert, architect (died 1920)
- 23 May – Mathilda Grabow, soprano opera singer (died 1940)
- 13 June – Anna Whitlock, social reformer and women's rights activist (died 1930)
- 24 November – Helena Munktell, composer (died 1919)
- 14 December – Prince Carl Oscar, Duke of Södermanland, prince (died 1854)

== Deaths ==
- Aurora Vilhelmina Koskull (1830)
  19 February – Aurora Wilhelmina Koskull, politically active salonnière (born 1778)
- 3 April – Marie-Louise af Forsell, diarist (born 1812)
- 25 May – Charlotta Berger, writer (born 1784)
- 18 June – Prince Gustaf, Duke of Uppland, composer (born 1827)
- 20 July – Gustav Åbergsson, actor (born 1775)

=== Undated ===
- Ulrika Åberg, ballerina (born 1771)
- Laura Bergnéhr, actress (born 1831)
- Mor Kerstin i Stämmemand-Kinna, Swedish industrialist (born 1774)

== Publications ==
- Louise Brunius publishes three novels under the pseudonym L-E: Skalden och sångerskan ('The Poet and the Singer'), En mystification ('A Mystification'), and I hemmet och ute i verlden ('At Home and in the World').
