= 1775 in Sweden =

- Years in Sweden: 1772 1773 1774 1775 1776 1777 1778
- Centuries: 17th century · 18th century · 19th century
- Decades: 1740s 1750s 1760s 1770s 1780s 1790s 1800s
- Years: 1772 1773 1774 1775 1776 1777 1778

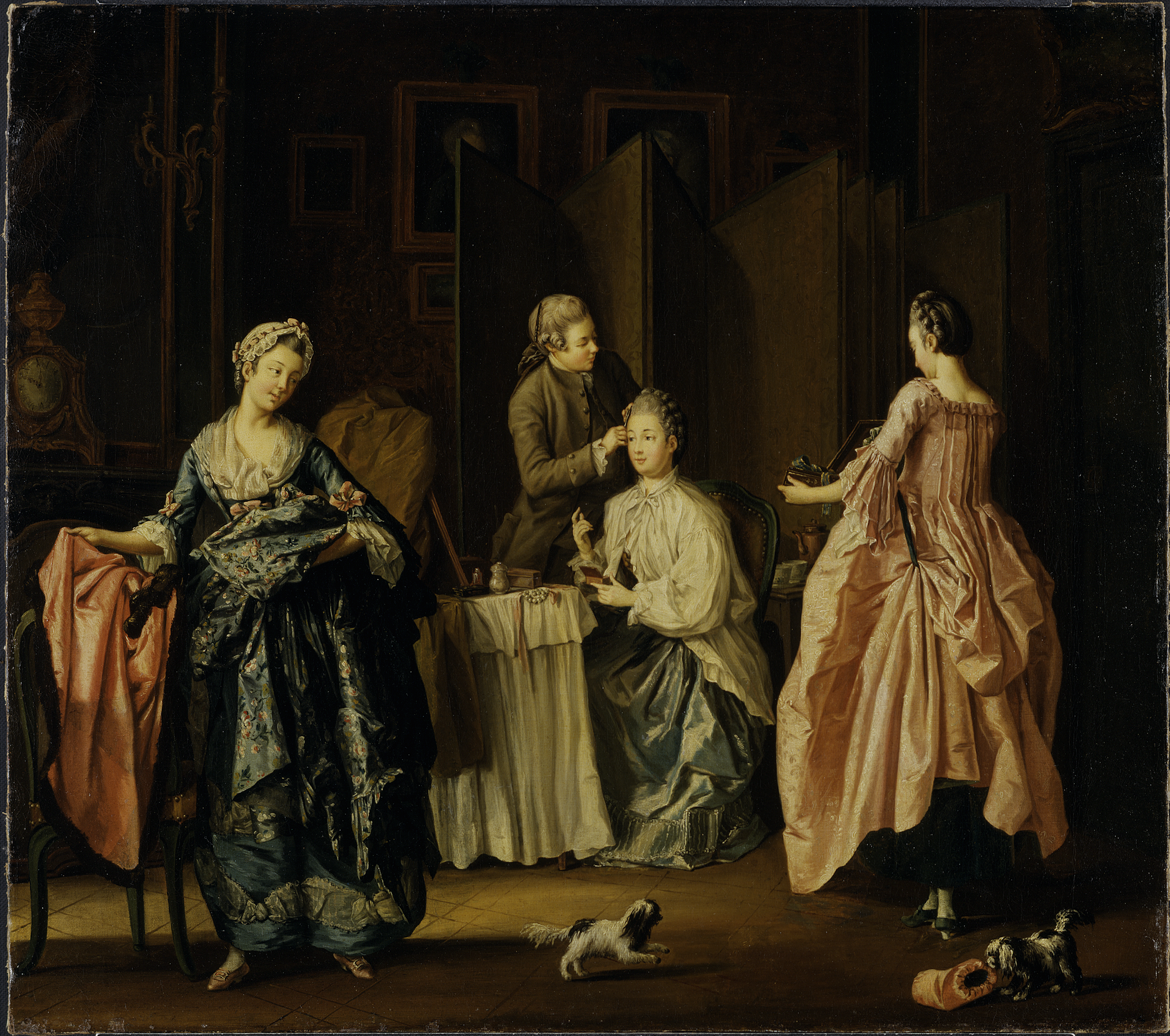
Pehr Hilleström-Morgontoiletten

Events from the year 1775 in Sweden

== Incumbents ==
- Monarch – Gustav III

== Events ==
- The first maternity hospital, Allmänna BB, is opened in the capital.
- Manganese is isolated by Johan Gottlieb Gahn.
- The manufacture of brännvin are taken over by the state, but the project does not meet with success as the Swedish public continue to manufacture it at home.
- Marstrand is made the only free port in Sweden.
- Afhandling om Bitter-, Selzer-, Spa- och Pyrmonter-Vatten samt deras tillredande genom konst by Torbern Bergman.
- By royal letter, all women in need of support are allowed to sell used items freely, such as used clothes, used furniture and other items which they had not made themselves and which were not recently manufactures and thereby would not disturb the privilege of the guild.
- Barbara Pauli establish her fashion shop in Stockholm, which becomes a center of fashion in the capital.

== Births ==
- Gustav Åbergsson, actor (died 1852)
- Ebba Modée, courtier (died 1840)

== Deaths ==
- 16 May - Ulla von Liewen, courtier and royal mistress (born 1747)
- Rosa Scarlatti, opera singer (born 1727)
