= 2019 in Sweden =

- Decades: 1990s; 2000s; 2010s; 2020s
- See also: Other events of 2019; Timeline of Swedish history

Events of 2019 in Sweden

== Incumbents ==
- Monarch – Carl XVI Gustaf
- Prime minister – Stefan Löfven

== Events ==
- 11–13 January – During the 2018–19 Swedish government formation after the 2018 general election, the Centre Party, Liberals, Green Party, and Social Democrats enter the January Agreement (Januariavtalet), in which the Social Democrats and the Greens are allowed to form a government with influence from the Centre and Liberals.
- 18 January – Incumbent Stefan Löfven returns to his role as prime minister after leading a caretaker government after the hung parliament of the 2018 elections. He is voted back in by the Riksdag after receiving votes from MPs of his own party and the Greens, while the centre, Liberals, and Left Party abstain, with one Centre MP voting against. The Moderate Party, Christian Democrats and Sweden Democrats all vote against. The Löfven II Cabinet is formed.
- 8 February – Bonnier Group and Amedia acquire media group Mittmedia.
- 21 March – Ebba Busch announced that her Christian Democrats party was ready to start negotiations with the Sweden Democrats in the Riksdag, making her the first party leader to express a willingness to cooperate with the SD.
- 4 May – Per Bolund is elected spokesperson of the Green Party, serving along Isabella Lövin who had served as co-spokesperson since 2016. Bolund replaced Gustav Fridolin
- 26 May – European Parliament elections are held.
- 7 June – A bomb exploded in Linköping, damaging several apartment buildings and injuring 25 people.
- 28 June – Nyamko Sabuni is elected leader of the Liberals, replacing Jan Björklund.
- 14 July – Eight parachutists and a pilot are killed when a GA8 Airvan crashes 5 kilometers southeast from Umeå on the island Storsandskär at the Ume River. The cause of the crash is found to be structural failure of a wing.
- 8 August – The newspaper Metro ceases publication after financial difficulties.
- 28 August – 16 year-old Swedish student Greta Thunberg arrives in New York Harbor after sailing across the Atlantic. Thunberg later testifies in front of the United States Congress on 18 September along with other climate activists. She later gives a speech at a UN summit on zero emissions.
- 10 September – Ann Linde takes office as foreign minister after Margot Wallström announced her resignation on 6 September.
- 15 November – anti immigration Sweden Democrats party top Swedish poll for first time.
- December 5 – Moderate Party leader Ulf Kristersson holds a held a meeting with Jimmie Åkesson, leader of the Sweden Democrats, and said that he would cooperate with them in parliament. The anti-immigration party had previously been subject to a cordon sanitaire by all other parties.
- December – the municipality of Skurup banned Islamic veils in educational institutions. Earlier the year, the municipality of Staffanstorp approved a similar ban.

== Sports ==
- 4–17 February: The FIS Alpine World Ski Championships are held in Åre.
- 7–17 March: The Biathlon World Championships are held in Östersund.
- 11–14 July: The 2019 European Athletics U23 Championships are held in Gävle.
- 18–21 July: The 2019 European Athletics U20 Championships are held in Borås.

== Deaths ==
- 18 February – Anna Borgeryd, entrepreneur, author and blogger (b. 1969)
- 5 April – Nina Lagergren, businesswoman and half-sister of Raoul Wallenberg (b. 1921)
- 14 April – Bibi Andersson, actress (b. 1935)
- 7 May – Bernt Frilén, orienteering competitor, world champion 1974 (b. 1945)
- 14 May – Sven Lindqvist, author (b. 1932).
- 4 June – Lennart Johansson, sports official, Honorary President of UEFA (b. 1929)
- 29 June – Gunilla Pontén, fashion designer (b. 1929)
- 14 July – Carl Bertil Agnestig, music teacher and composer (b. 1924)
- 19 July – Inger Berggren, singer (b. 1934)
- 30 August – Hans Rausing, businessman and philanthropist (b. 1926)
- 25 September – Arne Weise, journalist and television personality (b. 1930)
- 8 October – Roland Janson, actor (b. 1939)
- 12 October – Sara Danius, literary critic, philosopher and scholar (b. 1962)
- 17 October – Göran Malmqvist, linguist, literary historian, sinologist and translator (b. 1924)
- 21 October – Bengt Feldreich, radio and television journalist (b. 1925)
- 2 November – Sigvard Ericsson, speed skater (b. 1930)
- 9 December – Marie Fredriksson, songwriter, pianist, painter and lead vocalist of Roxette (b. 1958)

== See also ==
- 2019 European Parliament election
