= 1854 in Sweden =

- Decades: 1830s; 1840s; 1850s; 1860s; 1870s
- See also: Other events of 1854; Timeline of Swedish history

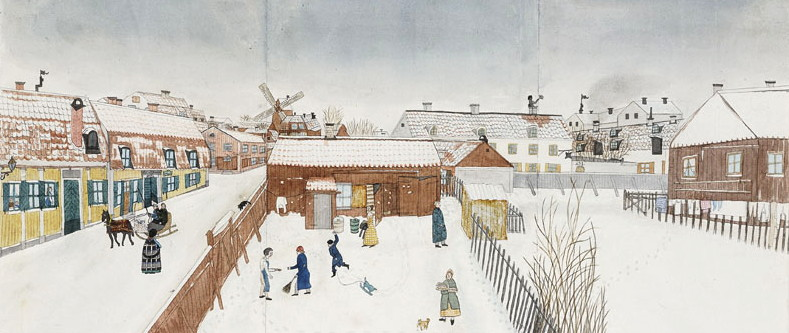
Sjöberg Högbergsgatan in winter 1850

Events from the year 1854 in Sweden

== Incumbents ==
- Monarch – Oscar I

== Events ==
- The Telegraph connection is established between Stockholm and Gothenburg.
- The first Train station.
- The free church of Anna Johansdotter Norbäck is separated from the state church.
- Founding of the Fruntimmersällskapet för fångars förbättring.
- November - Muteupproret.

== Births ==
- 12 January - Hugo Birger, painter (died 1887)
- 3 September – Anna Sandström, reform educator (died 1931)
- 8 November – Johannes Rydberg, physicist (died 1919)
- 14 November - Dina Edling, opera singer (died 1935)
- 27 November - Gerhard Louis De Geer, Prime Minister of Sweden from 1920 to 1921 (died 1935)

== Deaths ==
- 13 March - Prince Carl Oscar, Duke of Södermanland, prince (born 1852)
- 20 March - Anna Leonore König, singer (born 1771)
- 27 May - Stor-Stina, Sami (born 1819)
- Lisa Erlandsdotter, artist (born 1774)
- Vilhelm Pettersson, ballet dancer (born 1814)
