= Joel Blomqvist =

Joel Blomqvist may refer to:

- Joël Blomqvist (hymnwriter) (1840–1930), Swedish hymnwriter
- Joel Blomqvist (ice hockey) (born 2002), Finnish ice hockey player
