= 1928 in Sweden =

- Decades: 1900s; 1910s; 1920s; 1930s; 1940s
- See also: Other events of 1928; Timeline of Swedish history

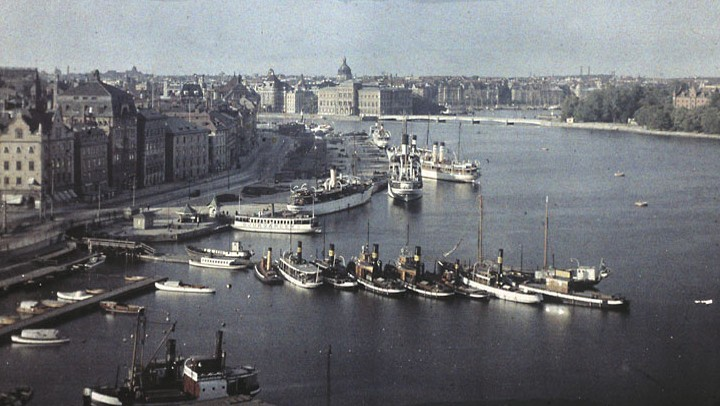
Stockholms' panorama in 1928

Events from the year 1928 in Sweden

== Incumbents ==
- Monarch – Gustaf V
- Prime Minister – Carl Gustaf Ekman, Arvid Lindman

== Events ==
- Judisk Tidskrift
- First official telephone line between Stockholm and New York is opened
- Swedish general election
- Johanneshovs IP was founded

== Literature ==
- Anna Svärd, novel by Selma Lagerlöf

== Sport ==
- 24–29 January – The World Table Tennis Championships were held in Stockholm

== Births ==
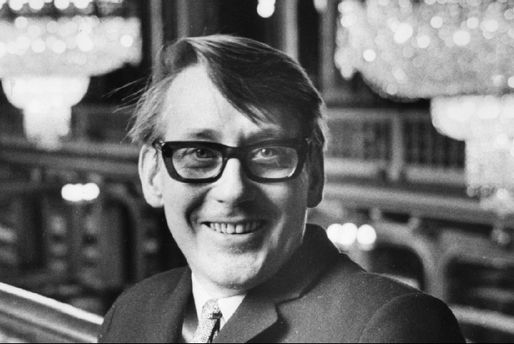
Stig Claesson.

- 24 March – Ivar Aronsson, Swedish rower (died 2017)
- 2 June – Stig Claesson, writer (died 2008)
- 29 June – Hans Cavalli-Björkman, lawyer
- 15 July – Stig Andersson-Tvilling, footballer and ice hockey player (died 1989).
- 15 July – Hans Andersson-Tvilling, footballer and ice hockey player.
- 18 July – Stig Grybe, actor, comedian, writer and film director (died 2017)
- 12 December – Ernst-Hugo Järegård, Swedish actor (d. 1998)
- 21 December – Stig Sjölin, boxer (died 1995).

== Deaths ==
- 6 February - Amanda Christensen, seamstress and business person (born 1863)
- 21 June – Carl Axel Magnus Lindman, botanist (born 1856)
- 20 August – Lisa Steier, ballerina and ballet master (born 1888)
- 13 September – Olena Falkman, concert vocalist (born 1849)
- 27 November – Gunhild Rosén, ballerina and ballet master (born 1855)
- 16 December – Ebba De la Gardie, reporter (born 1867)
