= 1935 in Sweden =

- Decades: 1910s; 1920s; 1930s; 1940s; 1950s
- See also: Other events of 1935; Timeline of Swedish history

Events from the year 1935 in Sweden

== Incumbents ==
- Monarch – Gustaf V
- Prime Minister – Per Albin Hansson

== Births ==
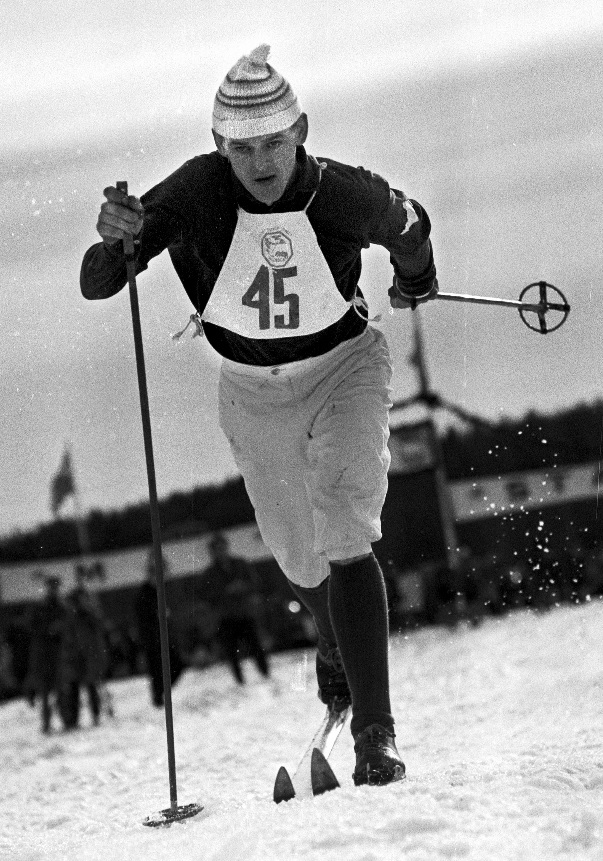
Assar Rönnlund in 1961.

- 19 August – Sun Axelsson, novelist (died 2011)
- 3 September – Assar Rönnlund, cross-country skier (died 2011).
- 22 September – Eilert Määttä, ice hockey player (died 2011).

=== Exact date unknown ===
- Erik Beckman, poet, novelist and playwright (died 1995).
- Per Agne Erkelius, novelist, playwright and teacher (died 2010).

== Deaths ==
- 9 January - Dina Edling, opera singer (born 1854)
- 27 January – Anna Boberg, artist (born 1864)
- 2 February – Calla Curman, literary personality (born 1850)
- 26 February – Hilda Sachs, journalist (born 1857)
- 19 October - Maria Cederschiöld, journalist and suffragette (born 1856)
- 21 December — Kurt Tucholsky, German journalist, satirist and writer (born 1890)
- 30 December – Gertrud Månsson, politician (born 1866)
