= 1932 in Sweden =

- Decades: 1910s; 1920s; 1930s; 1940s; 1950s
- See also: Other events of 1932; Timeline of Swedish history

Events from the year 1932 in Sweden.

== Incumbents ==
- Monarch - Gustaf V
- Prime Minister - Carl Gustaf Ekman, Felix Hamrin, and Per Albin Hansson

== Events ==
- 7 March - Von Sydow murders
- The Social Democrats formed a coalition with the Agrarian Party. Unemployment was reduced by efforts that bolstered the agricultural sector.

== Births ==
- 28 March – Sven Lindqvist, author
- 14 February – Harriet Andersson, actress
- 13 September – Bengt Hallberg, jazz pianist, composer, and arranger
- 22 September – Ingemar Johansson, boxer

== Deaths ==
- 8 February - Maria Stenkula, educational reformer (born 1842)
- September 28 - Augusta Jansson, entrepreneur (born 1859)
