= Anders Åberg =

Anders Åberg may refer to:

- Anders Åberg (artist) (1945–2018), Swedish sculptor, painter and cartoonist
- Anders Åberg (actor) (1948–2020), Swedish actor
