= 1933 in Sweden =

- Decades: 1910s; 1920s; 1930s; 1940s; 1950s
- See also: Other events of 1933; Timeline of Swedish history

Events from the year 1933 in Sweden

== Incumbents ==
- Monarch – Gustaf V
- Prime Minister – Per Albin Hansson

== Events ==
- 1933 - Social Democratic Party's Agreement with the Agrarian Party - The Social Democrats evolved from a purely class party to a broader party for ordinary people by the agreement with the Agrarian Party in 1933

== Popular culture ==
=== Sports ===
- 11–12 February – The ladies and pairs 1933 World Figure Skating Championships took place in Stockholm

== Births ==
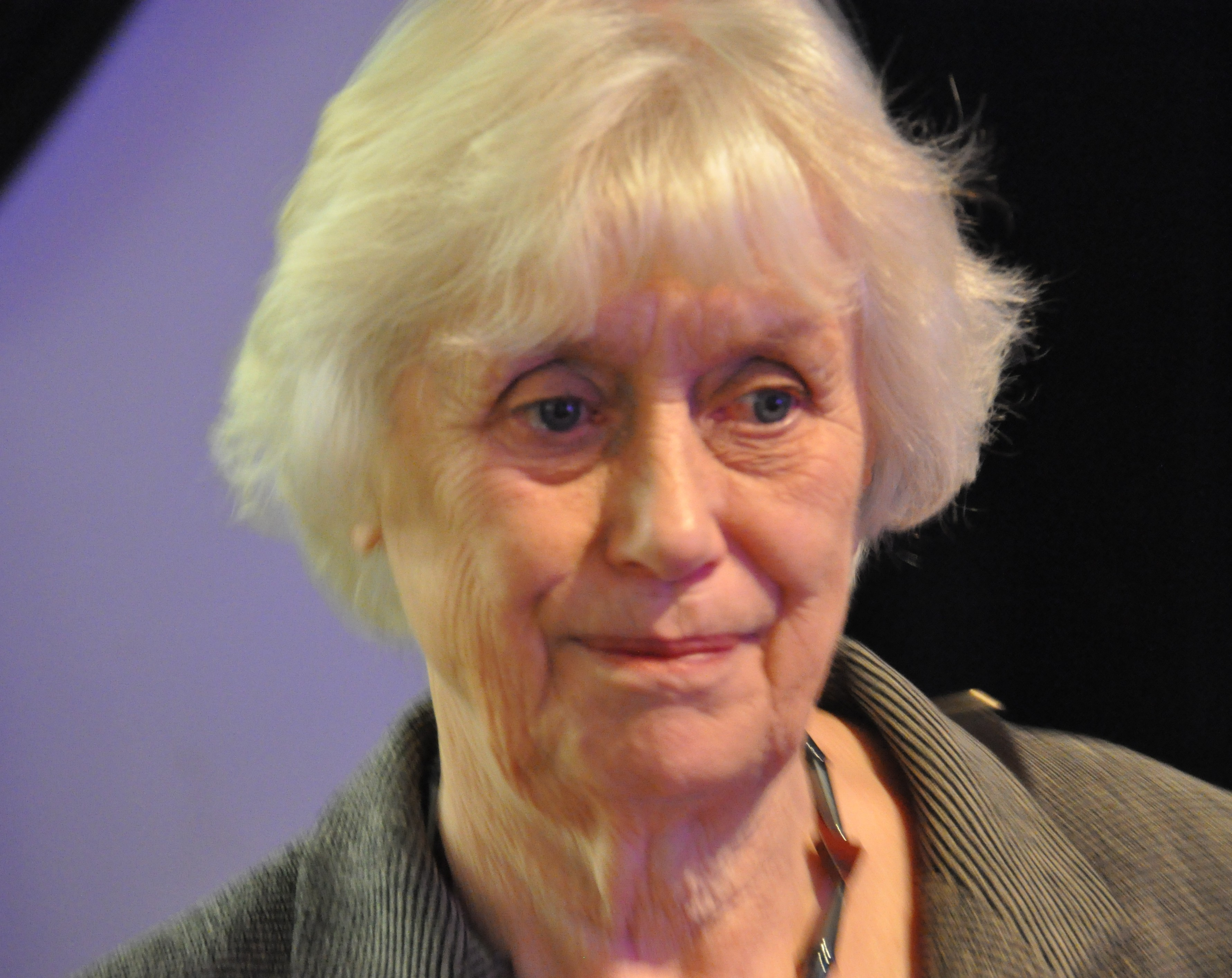
Kerstin Ekman 2011

- 14 February – Jan Mårtenson, diplomat and crime novelist
- 11 March –Sivar Nordström, orienteering competitor, co-founder of O-Ringen (died 2013).
- 19 May – Carl Billquist, actor (died 1993).
- 12 June – Ivar Nilsson, speed skater.
- 13 June – Börje Carlsson, sailor.
- 13 June – Sven-Olov Sjödelius, sprint canoer.
- 24 June – Lars Wohlin, politician
- 11 July – Per Myrberg, singer and actor (died 2023)
- 12 August – Anita Gradin, politician
- 27 August – Kerstin Ekman, novelist.
- 6 September – Axel Leijonhufvud, economist (died 2022)

== Deaths ==
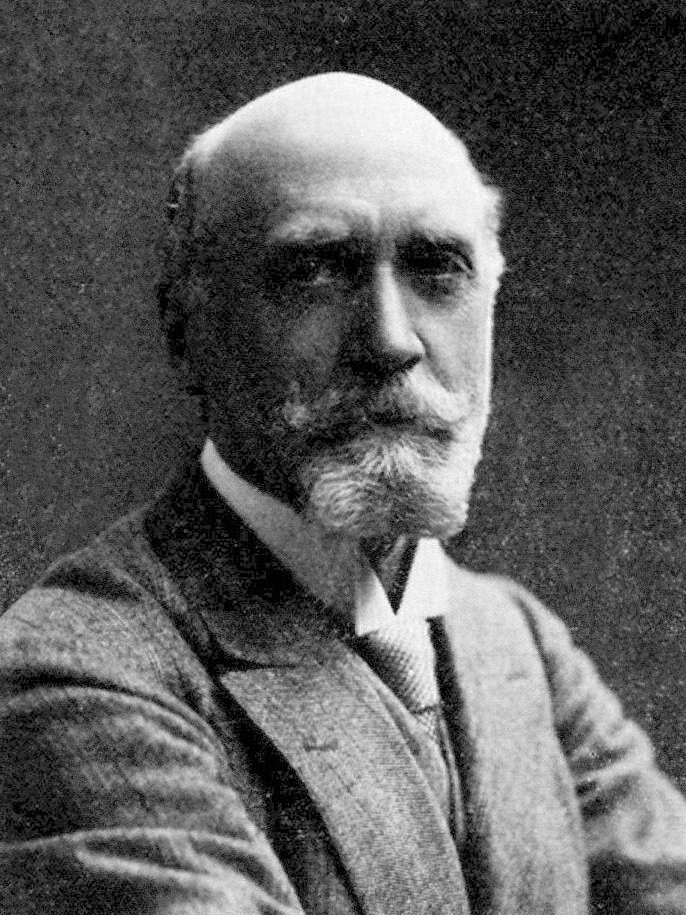
Axel Jungstedt.

- 7 April - Jenny Brandt, ballerina (born 1867).
- 26 July – Emil Magnusson, discus thrower (born 1887).

=== Exact date missing ===
- Axel Hamberg, mineralogist, geographer, Arctic explorer (born 1863).
- Axel Jungstedt, painter (born 1859).
- - Alma Åkermark, feminist and editor (born 1853)
