= 1927 in Sweden =

- Decades: 1900s; 1910s; 1920s; 1930s; 1940s
- See also: Other events of 1927; Timeline of Swedish history

Events from the year 1927 in Sweden

== Incumbents ==
- Monarch – Gustaf V
- Prime Minister – Carl Gustaf Ekman

== Events ==
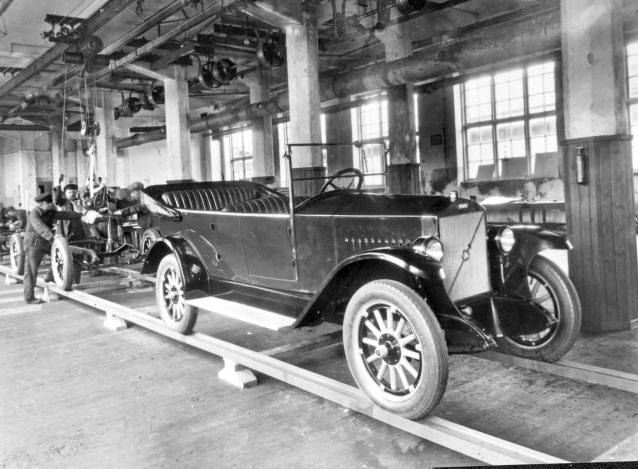
The first Volvo car was manufactured in 1927.

- The Volvo car manufacturing company was founded in Gothenburg, as a subsidiary to the Swedish ball bearing factory AB.
- Forex Bank established
- The Norra Kvill National Park established.

== Arts and culture ==
- The comic strip Kronblom was created by Elov Persson

== Births ==
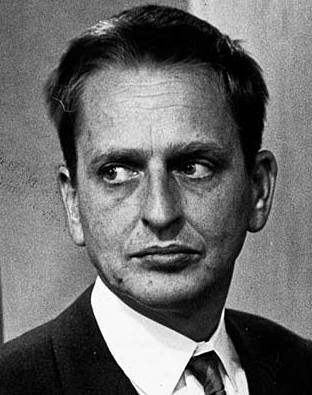
Olof Palme, prime minister 1969-76 and 1982-86.

- 30 January – Olof Palme, politician (died 1986)
- 30 April – Lars Hall, modern pentathlete, Olympic champion 1952 and 1956 (died 1991).
- 7 May
  - Åke Hansson, footballer
  - Elisabeth Söderström, soprano (died 2009).
- 25 June – Kjell Tånnander, Swedish decathlete
- 22 November – Gullan Bornemark, musician

== Deaths ==
- 7 July – Gösta Mittag-Leffler, mathematician (born 1846)
- 19 August – Johan Edman, tug-of-war competitor (born 1875).
- 2 October – Svante Arrhenius, scientist (born 1859)
- 24 December – Karl Oskar Medin, paediatrician (born 1847)
