= 1934 in Sweden =

- Decades: 1910s; 1920s; 1930s; 1940s; 1950s
- See also: Other events of 1934; Timeline of Swedish history

Events from the year 1934 in Sweden

== Incumbents ==
- Monarch – Gustaf V
- Prime Minister – Per Albin Hansson

== Events ==
- Dissolution of Välgörande fruntimmerssällskapet.
- The Swedish Social Democratic Party Wins the General Election

== Popular culture ==
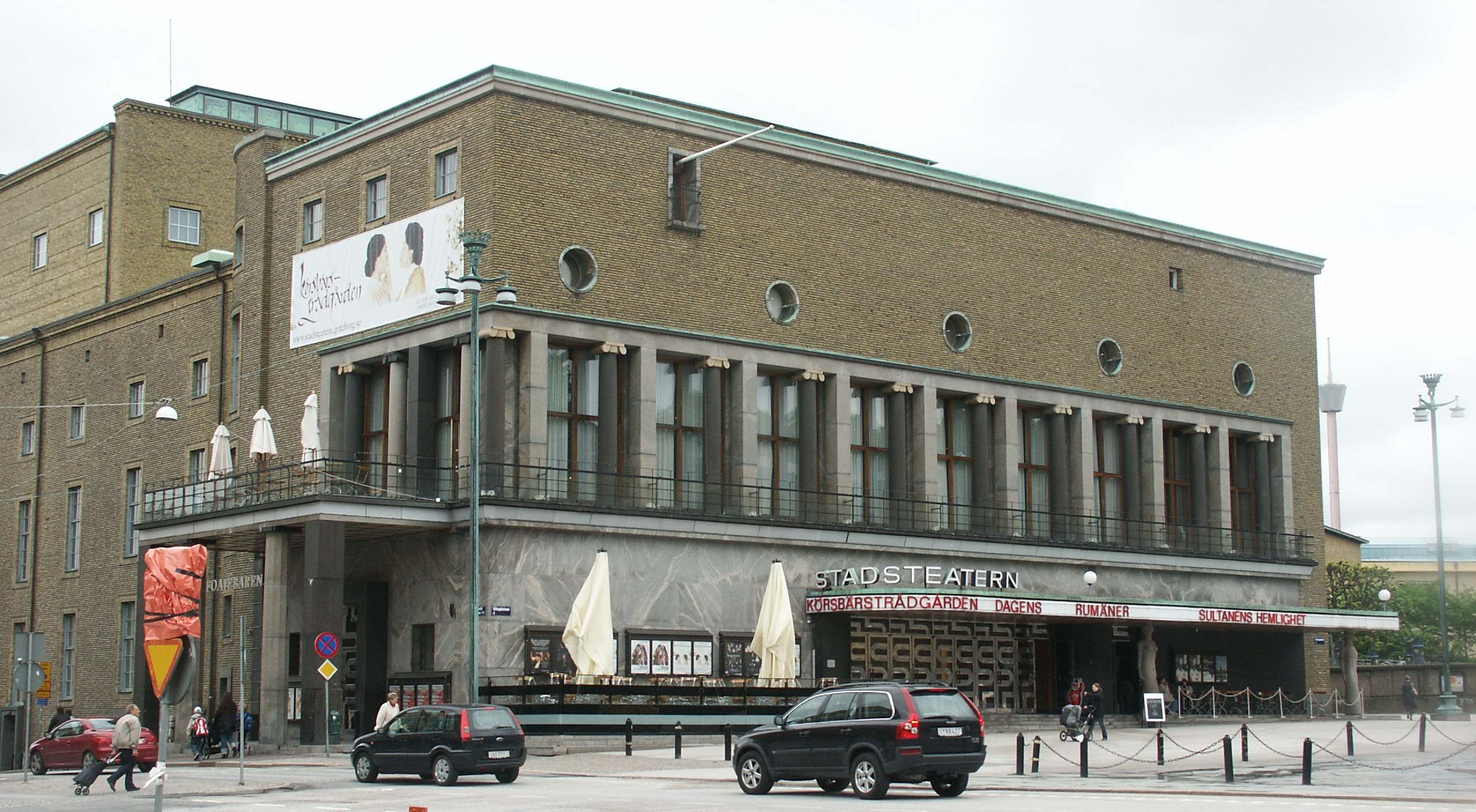
The Gothenburg City Theatre opened in 1934.

=== Theatre ===
- Gothenburg City Theatre opened

=== Sports ===
- 16–18 February – The men's World Figure Skating Championships took place in Stockholm
- 20–25 February – FIS Nordic World Ski Championships 1934 in Sollefteå
- 3–4 August – The 1934 World Archery Championships were held in Båstad

== Births ==
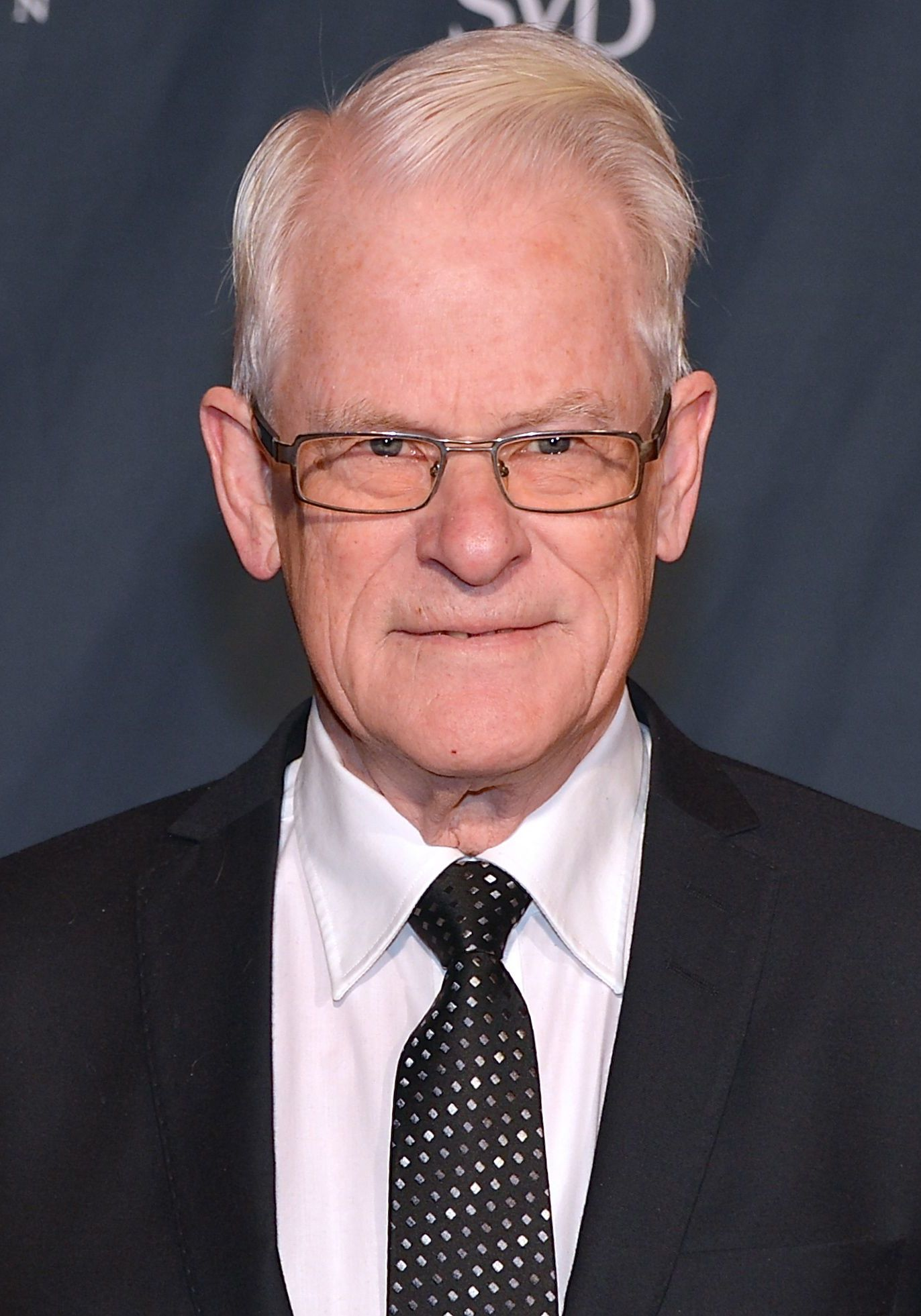
Ingvar Carlsson, 29th Prime Minister of Sweden.

- 22 March – May Britt, actress
- 17 May – Little Gerhard, singer and rock musician (died 2026)
- 21 May – Bengt I. Samuelsson, biochemist, recipient of the Nobel Prize in Physiology or Medicine
- 25 May – Sven Erlander, mathematician (died 2021)
- 28 May – Torsten Engberg, military officer (died 2018)
- 16 June – Evy Berggren, gymnast
- 22 June – Ragnar Svensson, Greco-Roman wrestler from Sweden
- 5 July – Erik Uddebom, athlete
- 18 October
  - Berit Lindholm, soprano (died 2023)
  - Inger Stevens, actress (died 1970)
- 31 October – Princess Margaretha, Mrs. Ambler
- 9 November – Ingvar Carlsson, politician
- 21 November – Carl-Henning Wijkmark, writer
- 22 November – Östen Warnerbring, singer and composer (died 2006)
- 24 November – Sven-Bertil Taube, actor and singer (died 2022)
- 9 December – Ingvar Hirdwall, actor (died 2023)

== Deaths ==
- 17 September – Erik Lindqvist, sailor (born 1886)
- 5 November – Carl Charlier, astronomer (born 1862)
