= 2016 in Sweden =

- Decades: 1990s; 2000s; 2010s; 2020s
- See also: Other events of 2016; Timeline of Swedish history

Events in the year 2016 in Sweden.

== Incumbents ==
- Monarch – Carl XVI Gustaf
- Prime minister – Stefan Löfven

== Events ==
- 2016 Sweden riots

== Television ==
- 2016 in Swedish television

== Sport ==
- Sweden at the 2016 Summer Olympics
- Sweden at the 2016 Summer Paralympics
- August 20 to 27 – the 2016 World Orienteering Championships were held in Strömstad and Tanum.

== Music ==
- Sweden in the Eurovision Song Contest 2016

=== Crime ===
- 2016 Sweden terrorism plot
- Killing of Alexandra Mezher
- 2016 social unrest in Sweden

== Births ==
- March 2 – Prince Oscar, Duke of Skåne

== Deaths ==
- 11 January – Gunnel Vallquist (b. 1918).
- 17 January
  - Carina Jaarnek (b. 1962).
  - Kjell Alinge (b. 1943).
- 25 January – Alexandra Mezher
- 30 January – Calle Wisborg (b. 1969).
- 5 February – Bodil Malmsten (b. 1944).
- 29 February – Josefin Nilsson (b. 1969).
- 30 June – Martin Lundström, Olympic cross country skier (b. 1918).
- 23 July – Thorbjörn Fälldin (b. 1926).
- 17 September – Sigge Parling, footballer (b. 1930).
