= 1774 in Sweden =

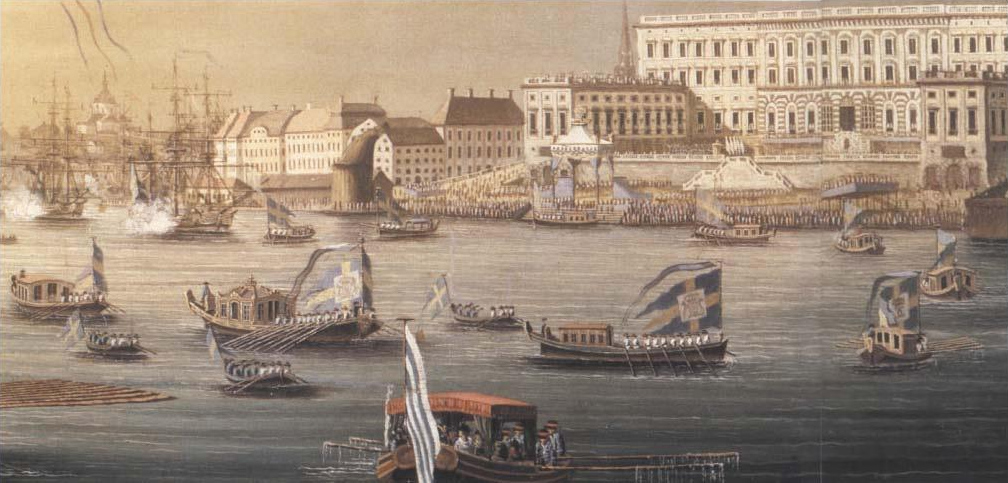
Wedding between Prince Charles and Hedvig Elisabeth Charlotte of Holstein-Gottorp. by Hilleström

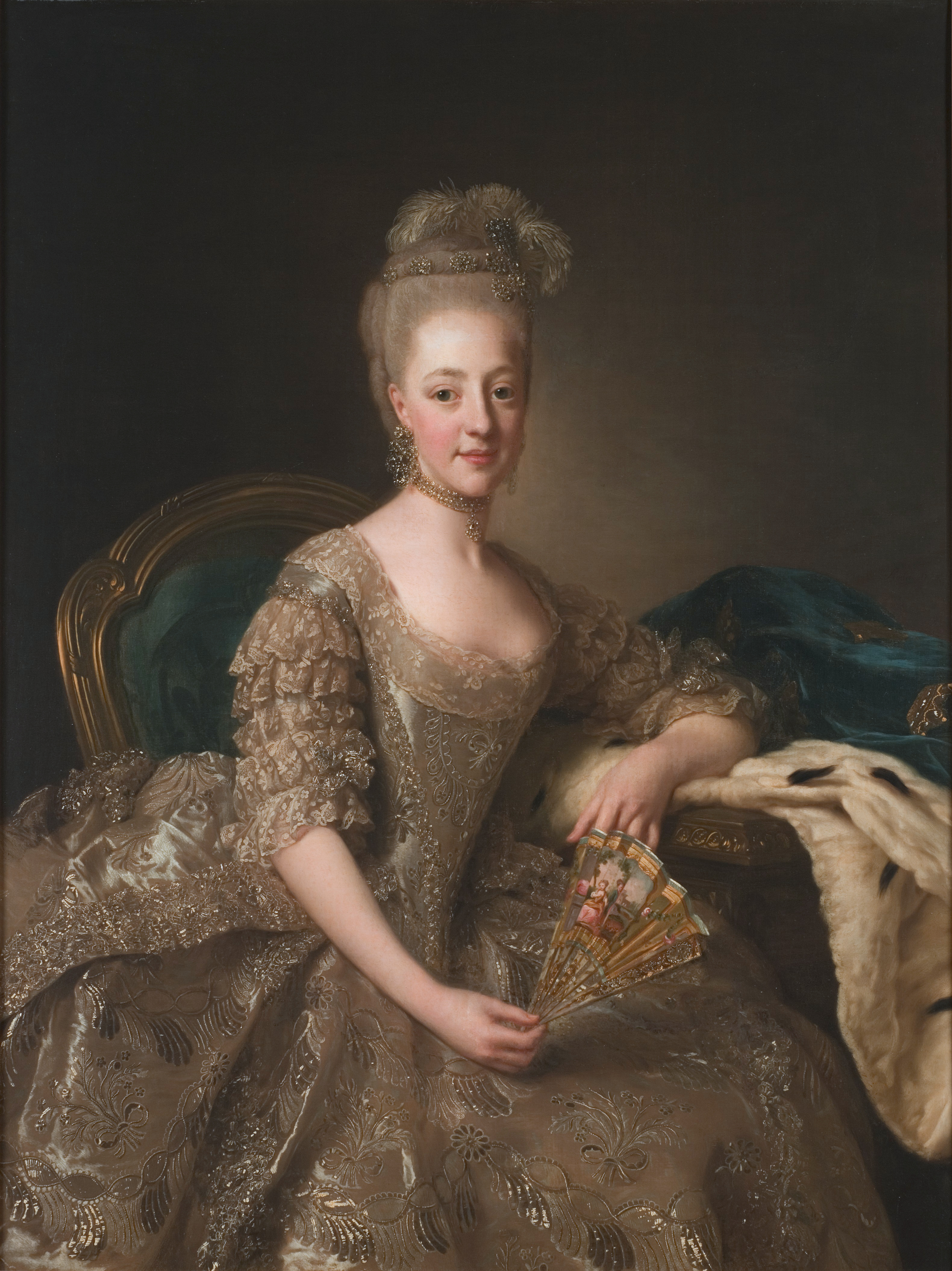
Hedvig Elisabeth Charlotte of Holstein-Gottorp, shortly after her wedding. Portrait by Alexander Roslin, 1774.

Events from the year 1774 in Sweden

== Incumbents ==
- Monarch – Gustav III

== Events ==
- 28 April – The Freedom of the press is restricted.
- 7 June - Wedding between Prince Charles and Hedvig Elisabeth Charlotte of Holstein-Gottorp.
- - Aaron Isaac emigrates to Stockholm from Germany: he is the first Jew who is granted permission to immigrate to Sweden.
- Maria Christina Bruhn presents her invention, a package for gunpowder to the Royal Swedish Academy of Sciences.

== Births ==
- 11 February - Hans Järta, administrator and revolutionary (died 1847)
- 17 November - Lisa Erlandsdotter, tapestry maker (died 1854)
- Mor Kerstin i Stämmemand-Kinna, Swedish industrialist (died 1852)

== Deaths ==
- 31 March - Johan Peter Falk, botanist and an apostle of Carl Linnaeus (born 1733)
- 24 September - Margaretha Donner, business woman (born 1726)
- 4 October - Märta Ljungberg, innkeeper (born 1656)
