= 2018 in Sweden =

- Decades: 1990s; 2000s; 2010s; 2020s
- See also: Other events of 2018; Timeline of Swedish history

Events in the year 2018 in Sweden.

== Incumbents ==
- Monarch – Carl XVI Gustaf
- Prime minister – Stefan Löfven

== Events ==
- 5 March – Alternative for Sweden is formed from a split from Sweden Democrats. Two Sweden Democrat members of the Riksdag, Olle Felten and Jeff Ahl, defected to the party later that month.
- May–August – 2018 Sweden wildfires
- 14 August – More Than 100 Cars Burned in Mass Arson Attack in Sweden.
- 20 August – 15 years old Swedish schoolgirl Greta Thunberg starts to stay out of school in an attempt to give attention to the climate change issue.
- 9 September –2018 Swedish general election is held.

== Sports ==
- 21 to 28 April – The 2018 World Mixed Doubles Curling Championship ar held in Östersund.

== Deaths ==
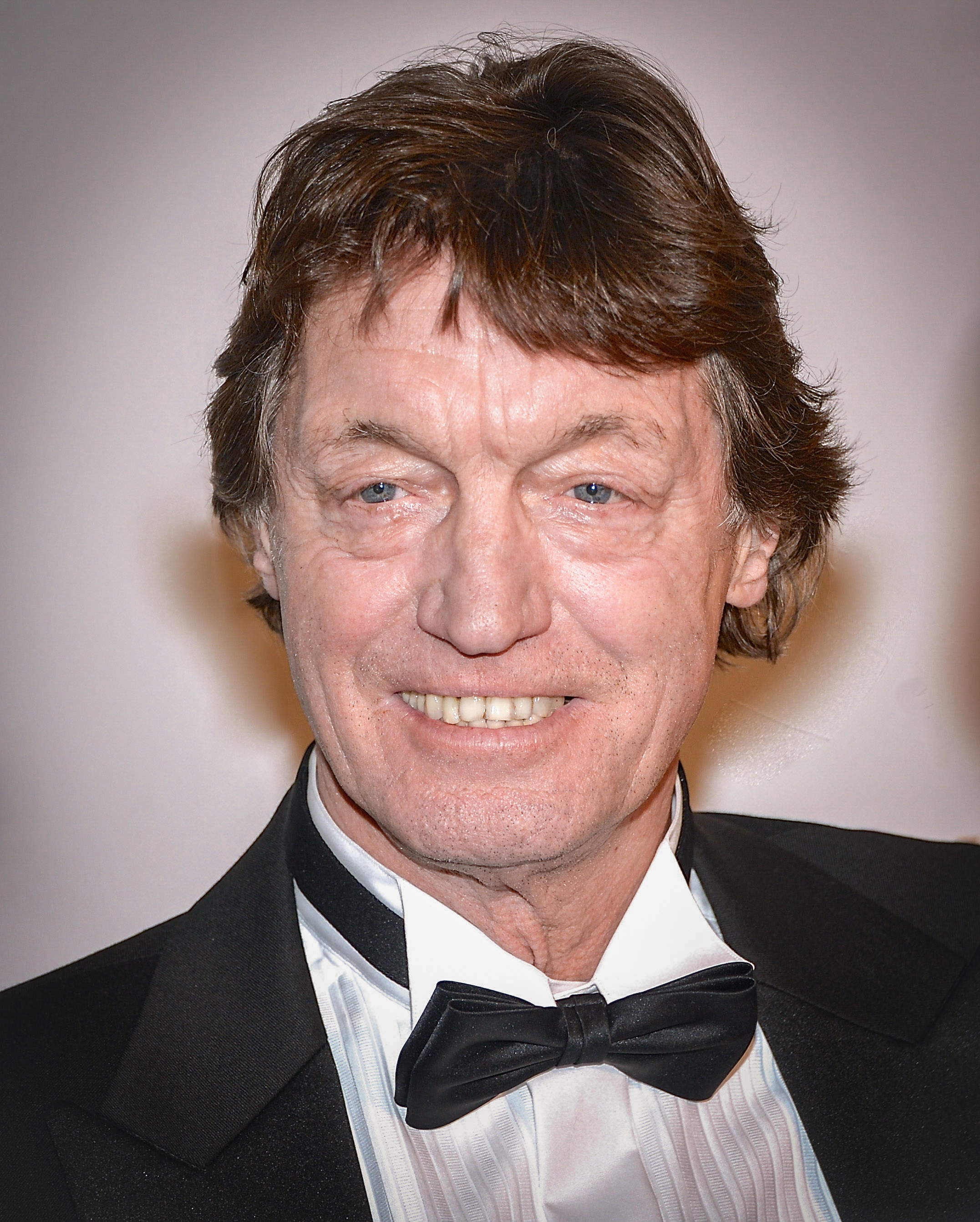
Johannes Brost

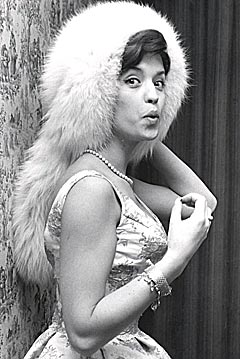
Lill-Babs

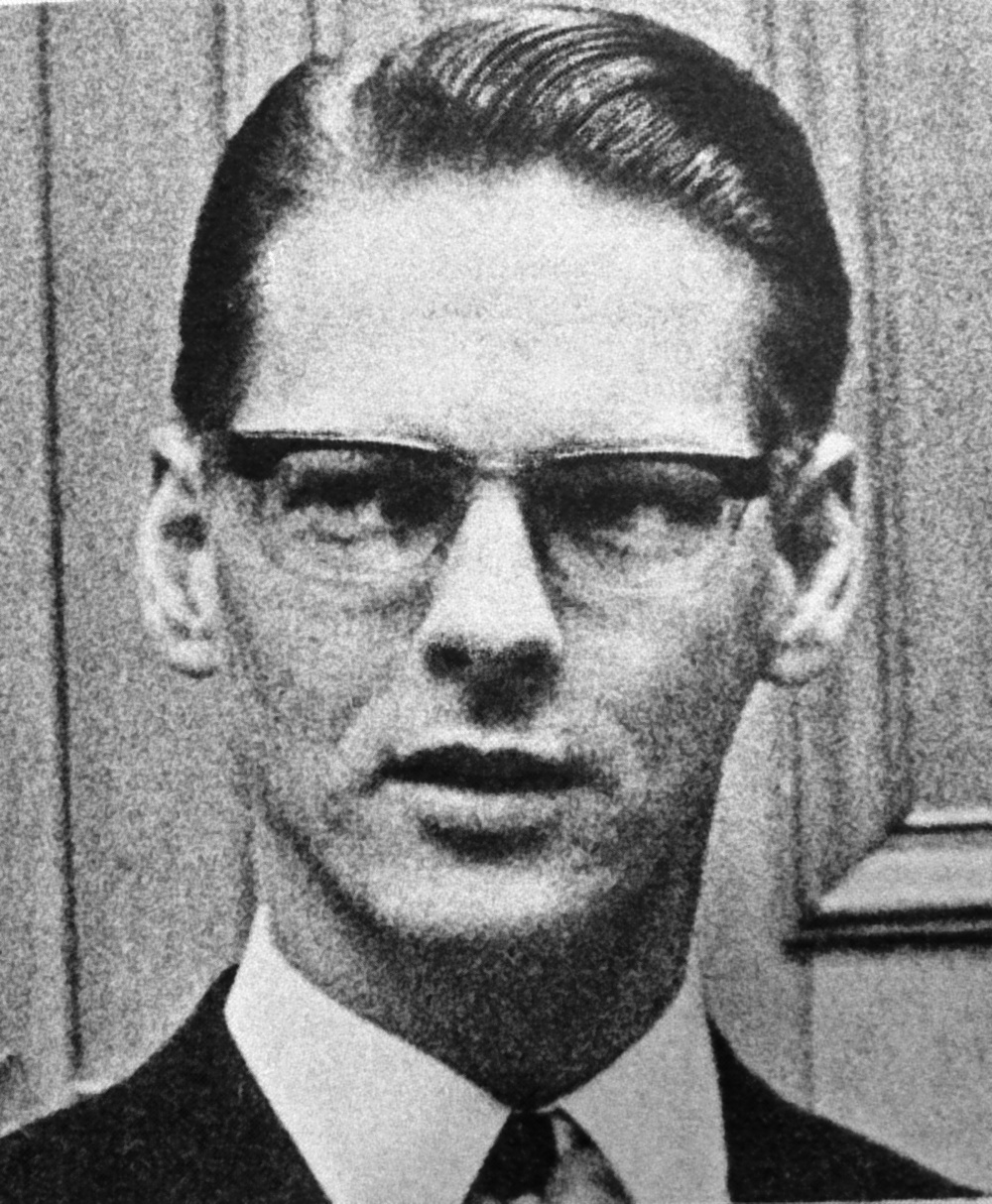
Ola Ullsten

- 4 January – Johannes Brost, actor (b. 1946).
- 23 January – Anders Åberg, painter, cartoonist and sculptor (b. 1945)
- 27 January – Ingvar Kamprad, businessman, founder of IKEA (b. 1926)
- 1 February – Robert Larsson, ice hockey player (b. 1967)
- 3 March – Kenneth Gärdestad, songwriter (b. 1948)
- 5 March – Kjerstin Dellert, opera singer (b. 1925)
- 20 March – Ann-Charlotte Alverfors, writer (b. 1949)
- 21 March – Ulrica Hydman Vallien, artist (b. 1938)
- 25 March – Jerry Williams, singer and actor (b. 1942)
- 29 March – Sven-Olov Sjödelius, canoeist, Olympic champion in 1960 and 1964 (b. 1933)
- 3 April – Lill-Babs, singer and actress (b. 1938)
- 20 April – Avicii, musician, DJ, remixer and record producer (b. 1989)
- 28 May – Ola Ullsten, politician, former Prime Minister (b. 1931)
- 6 June – Åke Wärnström, boxer (b. 1925).
- 8 June – Per Ahlmark, politician (b. 1939).
- 29 June – Arvid Carlsson, neuropharmacologist and Nobel Prize laureate (b. 1923)
- 2 August – Eric Torell, man with Down syndrome who was shot by police (b. 1997)
- 11 October – Labinot Harbuzi, footballer (b. 1986)
- 18 October – Lisbeth Palme, child psychologist, former chairwoman of UNICEF (b. 1931)
