= 2014 in Sweden =

- Decades: 1990s; 2000s; 2010s; 2020s
- See also: Other events of 2014; Timeline of Swedish history

Events from the year 2014 in Sweden.

== Incumbents ==
- Monarch – Carl XVI Gustaf
- Prime Minister – Fredrik Reinfeldt, Stefan Löfven

== Events ==
=== March ===
- 8–9 March – Knife attacks in the Möllevången neighbourhood of Malmö, in which neo-Nazis connected to the Party of the Swedes injure four people who had taken part in a demonstration celebrating International Women's Day that had just ended. Initial media reports of "a clash between leftwing and rightwing extremists" were widely condemned as misleading
- 16 March – Thousands demonstrate against fascism in Malmö, in response to the International Women's Day knife attacks the previous weekend.

=== July ===
- 31 July-11 August – 2014 Västmanland Wildfire.

=== September ===
- 14 September – The 2014 Swedish general election

=== December ===
- 2 December –
- 3 December – Prime Minister of Sweden Stefan Lofven calls a snap general election after the Riksdag rejected the proposed Government budget in favour of a budget promoted by the centre-right opposition.
- 9 December – The Pirate Bay website goes offline after Swedish police seize its servers.

== Deaths ==
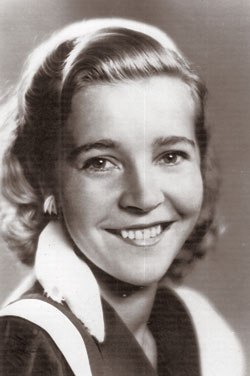
Alice Babs in 1940.

- 6 January – Lena Smedsaas, journalist (b. 1951).
- 11 February – Alice Babs, singer and actress (b. 1924).
- 6 March – Barbro Kollberg, film actress (b. 1917).
- 29 March – Birgitta Valberg, actress (b. 1916).
- 7 July – Bertil Haase, modern pentathlete (b. 1923).
- 25 August – Lars Mortimer, comic artist (b. 1946).
- 29 August
  - Brasse Brännström, actor and screenwriter (b. 1945).
  - Björn Waldegård, rally driver (b. 1943).
- 12 September – Bengt Saltin, professor of human physiology (b. 1935).
- 29 October – Klas Ingesson, footballer (b. 1968).
- 21 December – Åke Johansson, footballer (b. 1928).

== See also ==
- 2014 in Swedish television
