= 2015 in Sweden =

- Decades: 1990s; 2000s; 2010s; 2020s
- See also: Other events of 2015; Timeline of Swedish history

The following lists events that happened in 2015 in Sweden.

== Incumbents ==
- Monarch – Carl XVI Gustaf
- Prime Minister – Stefan Löfven

== Events ==
- 15 June: Lisa Holm's body discovery
- 10 August: Västerås IKEA stabbing attack
- 18 March: 2015 Gothenburg pub shooting
- 23 May: Måns Zelmerlöw's song Heroes wins the Eurovision Song Contest in Vienna, Austria.
- 22 October: Trollhättan school stabbing
- 12 November: Shopping mall Mall of Scandinavia is inaugurated in Solna.
- The Sweden Democrats announced that they would break ties with its youth league Sweden Democratic Youth for its Radical Ultranationalism.

== Deaths ==
- 11 January – Anita Ekberg, actress (b. 1931).
- 26 March – Tomas Tranströmer, Nobel poet and translator (b. 1931).
- 30 April – Lennart Bodström, politician (b. 1928).
- 4 June – Bengt Berndtsson, footballer (b. 1933).
- 5 October – Henning Mankell, author (b. 1948).
- 21 November – Linda Haglund, 59, short-distance runner (b. 1956).
- 19 December – Karin Söder, politician (b. 1928).
- 22 December – Peter Lundblad, 65, singer (b. 1950).

== See also ==
- 2015 in Swedish television
