= 2019 Linköping explosion =

Disaster in Linköping, Sweden

Coordinates: 58°24′31″N 15°37′55″E

The 2019 Linköping explosion was a bombing of a residential area in Linköping, Sweden, on 7 June 2019. The police believe that the explosion was part of a rivalry between criminal gangs. Unlike most criminal incidents involving bombs or explosive material in Sweden, the attack damaged more than 150 homes and caused substantial damage to an entire apartment block. The New York Post stated that 25 people were injured, and Expressen reported that seven were taken to hospital. Investigators expressed surprise that nobody was killed in the explosion.

Damages were estimated at 80 million SEK.
