= Augusta Jansson =

Swedish entrepreneur (1859–1932)

Augusta Jansson (1859–1932), was a Swedish entrepreneur.

She was the daughter of the farmer Jan Magnus Andreasson and Maja Chatarina Ersdotter. In 1880, she moved to Stockholm, where she was employed in a candy factory. In 1882, she opened her own candy shop with her sister Signe André. The sisters became very successful. Their candy was sold all over the capital by female street vendors. It eventually expanded into hundreds of different kinds of confectionery. They became famous in the contemporary Swedish candy industry, and their confectionaries were sold to the Swedish Royal Court. Jansson died in 1932, but the business was managed by her sister Signe André until the 1960s.
