= Anna Ehrenström =

Swedish poet

Anna Ehrenström, née Gråberg (13 May 1786 – 1857), was a Swedish poet.

She was the daughter of the Lawspeaker Christian Gråberg of Gotland and Catharina Magdalena Tofftén, and the sister of the diplomat Jacob Gråberg, ennobled Italian count and member of the Swedish Royal Academy of Science and Literature. In 1812, she married the major Nils Ludvig Ehrenström. She was divorced in 1832 after adultery on her part, and was forced to leave her former spouse all her property in the divorce settlement to be free of the marriage.

After the divorce, she lived in Stockholm, where she supported herself and her daughter by selling books. She was a known profile in Stockholm literary life in the 1830s-and 1850s, and has been referred to as the first female poet of Gotland. She dictated some folk songs for Gunnar Olof Hyltén-Cavallius.

She died after a risky operation.

== Works ==
- Skaldeförsök (1838)
- Skaldeförsök (1823)
- Hundarnes klagosång (1852)

== Sources ==
- Anna Ehrenström i Wilhelmina Stålberg, Anteckningar om svenska qvinnor (1864)
- Emma Eriksson & Christina Henriksson: Spegel, spegel på väggen där" (2005)
