= 1773 in Sweden =

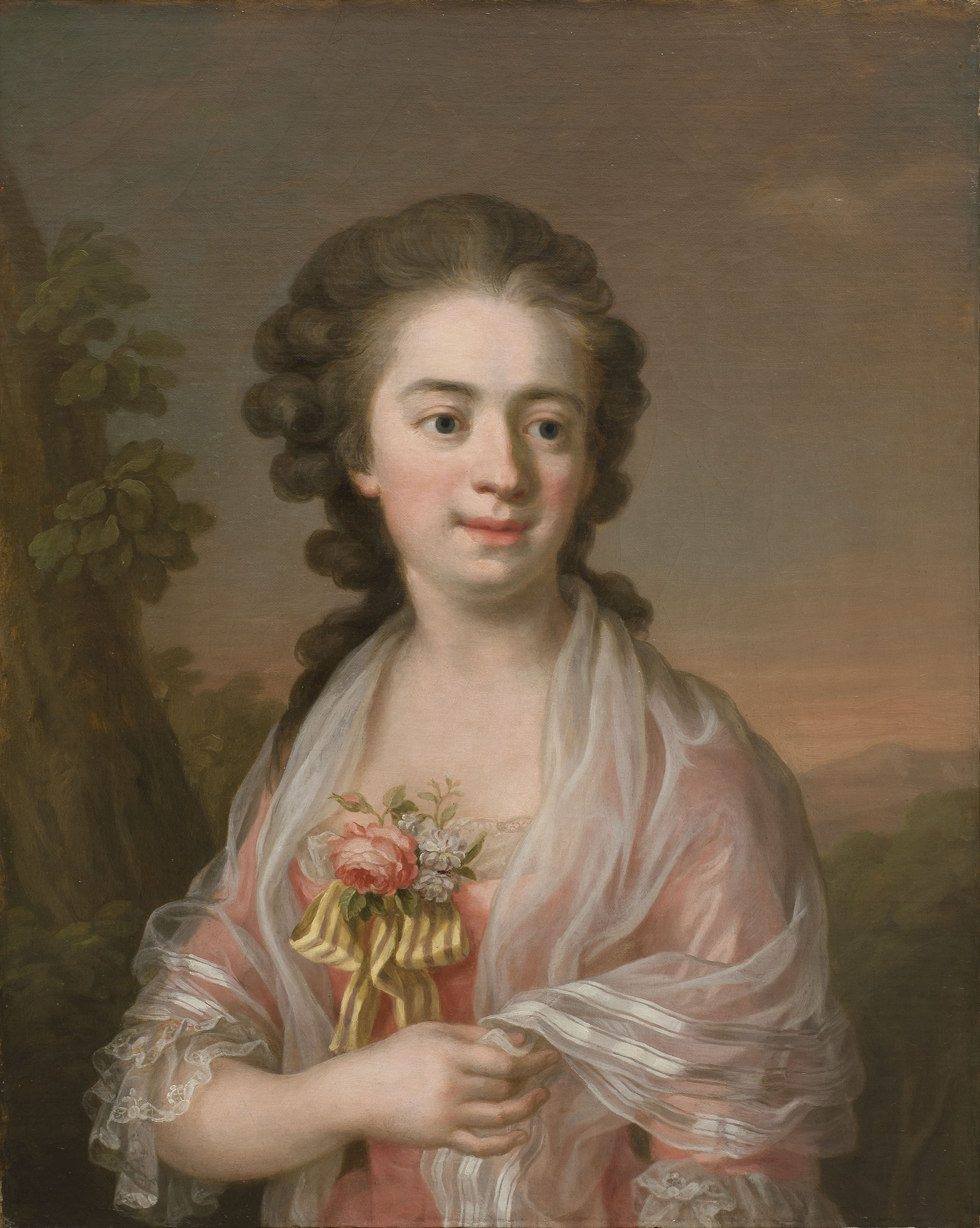
Ulrica pasch

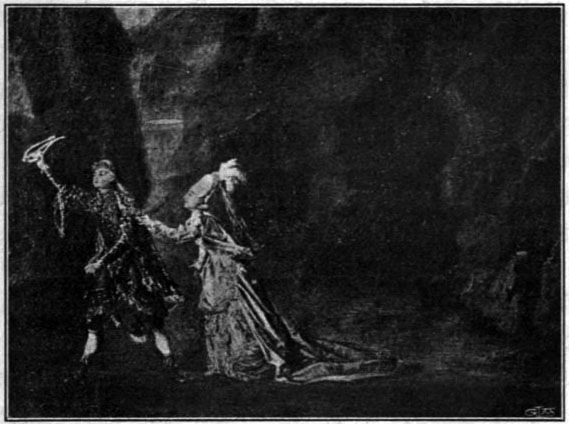
Elisabeth Olin and Carl Stenborg in Orpheus at Bollhuset.

Events from the year 1773 in Sweden

== Incumbents ==
- Monarch – Gustav III

== Events ==
- January 18 – The first opera performance in the Swedish language, Thetis et Pelée, performed by Carl Stenborg and Elisabeth Olin in Bollhuset, marks the establishment of the Royal Swedish Opera.
- August – Inauguration of the pleasure gardens Vauxhall (Gotheburg).
- The Royal Swedish Ballet is founded.
- The title Hovsångare is created by King Gustav III of Sweden, with the first recipients being Elisabeth Olin and Carl Stenborg.
- The Royal Swedish Academy of Arts is formally organized. Fifteen artists are accepted as members the same year, among them being Lorens Pasch the Younger and Ulrika Pasch.
- A theater designed by Carl Fredrik Adelcrantz is constructed for the royal court at Gripsholm Castle.
- The population death rate doubles and the child mortality rate rose to 49% in of newborns under the age of five, due to famine and dysentery caused by crop failures in the previous years.
- Mobilization of the army in the province of Finland because of a feared attack from the Empire of Russia.
- De nymodiga fruntimren by Catharina Ahlgren.

== Births ==
- 9 December - Marianne Ehrenström, culture personality and multiple artist, member of the Royal Swedish Academy of Music (died 1867)
- - Inga Åberg, opera singer and stage actress (died 1837)

== Deaths ==
- - Beata Sabina Straas, actress (born unknown date)
