= 2017 in Sweden =

- Decades: 1990s; 2000s; 2010s; 2020s
- See also: Other events of 2017; Timeline of Swedish history

Events in the year 2017 in Sweden.

== Incumbents ==
- Monarch – Carl XVI Gustaf
- Prime minister – Stefan Löfven

== Events ==
- 20 February – Rinkeby riots
- 7 April – 2017 Stockholm truck attack
- 1 July – The new Name Act of 2017 takes legal effect, replacing the Name Act of 1982
- 31 August – 2017 Medborgarplatsen stabbing
- 11-29 September – Aurora 17

== Sports ==
- 22 October –
  - Tennis: Juan Martín del Potro defeats Grigor Dimitrov 6–4, 6–2 in the final of the 2017 Stockholm Open singles.
  - Tennis: Oliver Marach and doubles partner Mate Pavić defeat Aisam-ul-Haq Qureshi and Jean-Julien Rojer in the 2017 Stockholm Open doubles.

== Popular culture ==
=== Sports ===
- 24 January – 5 February – The 2017 Bandy World Championship was held in Sweden. The Swedish team won gold medals, while Russia placed second and Finland placed third.

== Deaths ==
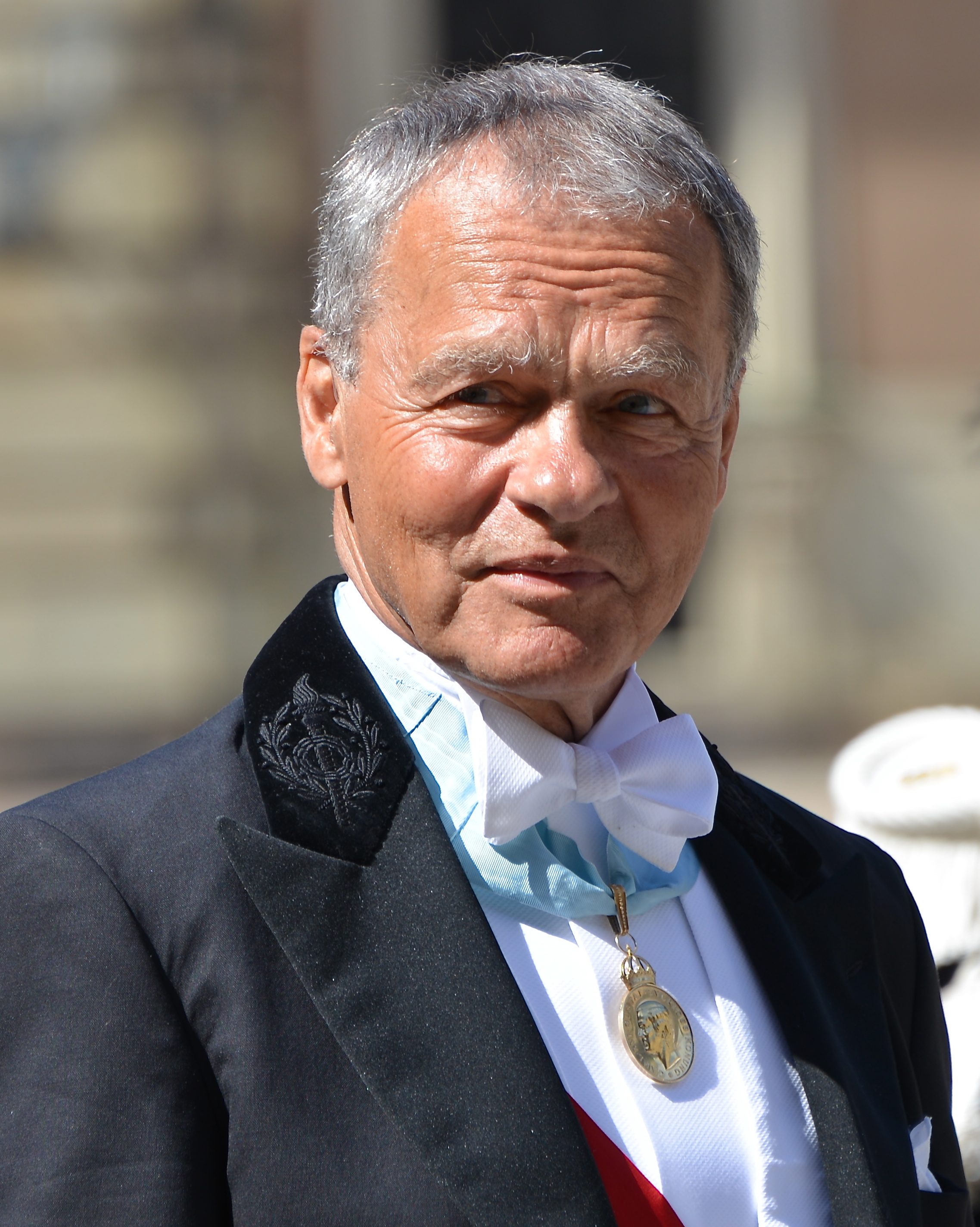
Ulf Dinkelspiel

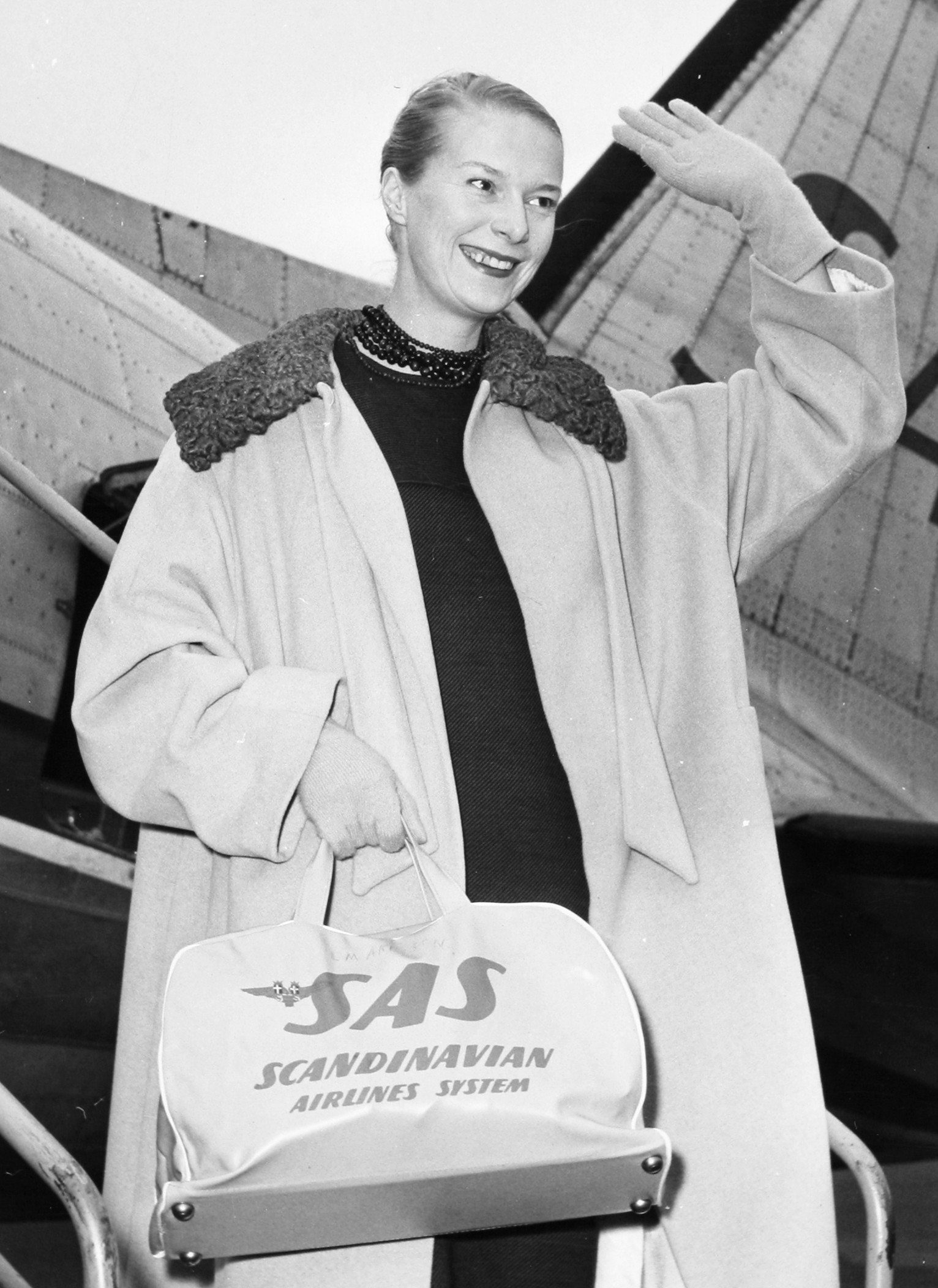
Katja of Sweden in 1957

- 8 January – Nicolai Gedda, operatic tenor (b. 1925).
- 9 January – Ulf Dinkelspiel, politician (b. 1939).
- 23 January – Katja of Sweden, fashion designer (b. 1920).
- 25 January – Siewert Öholm, journalist, television presenter (b. 1939).
- 7 February – Hans Rosling, medical doctor, academic, statistician, and public speaker (b. 1948).
- 16 February – Bengt Gustavsson, footballer and manager (b. 1928).
- 1 June – Rosa Taikon, silversmith (b. 1926).
- 13 June – Ulf Stark, author (b. 1944).
- 15 June – Stina Haage, gymnast (b. 1924).
- 27 June – Michael Nyqvist, actor (b. 1960).
- 10 September – Hans Alfredson, actor (b. 1931).
- 17 November – Rikard Wolff, actor and singer (b. 1958).

== See also ==
- 2017 in the European Union
- 2017 in Europe
