= Sun Axelsson =

Swedish poet, novelist, translator and journalist (1935–2011)

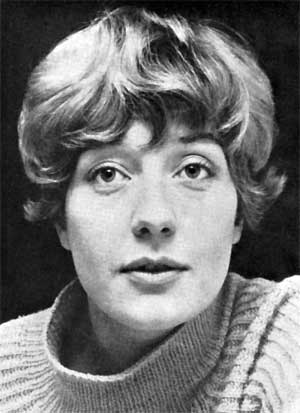
Sun Axelsson, approximately 1960.

Sun Axelsson (19 August 1935 in Gothenburg, Sweden – 14 January 2011 in Stockholm) was a Swedish poet, novelist, translator and journalist.

== Life ==
Axelsson was the youngest daughter of the master gardener Karl Edvin Axelsson and Mignon Axelsson. She went to school in her home town of Gothenburg and then she continued at the University of Stockholm where she took a graduate degree in teaching and journalism.

As reporter she worked for the literary review magazines BLM and Ord and Bild, and also in daily newspapers: Expressen, Aftonbladet and Stockholms-Tidningen.

In 1959, Axelsson debuted with her first collection of poetry: Goalless (Mållös), and then she travelled extensively, with lengthy stays in Latin America, France and Greece.

She spent the whole of 1960 in Chile, and developed a relationship with the Chilean poet Nicanor Parra. While living in Santiago she also formed a close friendship with Nobel Prize–winning poet Pablo Neruda. The events of her time in Chile and her personal experience of them are portrayed in The cradle of fire (Eldens vagga).

Later, she wrote Stones in the mouth (Stenar i munnen), published under the male pseudonym Jan Olov Hedlund, describing the terror and repression of Greece under the military junta. and Honey wolves (Honungsvargar).

Axelsson translated into Swedish a remarkable number of authors, among them: Pablo Neruda, Federico García Lorca, Jorge Luis Borges, Harold Pinter, Yiannis Ritsos, Octavio Paz, Sergio Badilla Castillo and Juan Cameron.

The author's trilogy which began with A dreamed life (Drömmen om ett liv, 1978), and finished with The night season (Nattens arstid, 1989) was bestowed with numerous awards, from places such as the Swedish Academy as well as from several international cultural institutions.

== Work ==
- Jag har en själ i Paris (My soul in Paris. 1990) novel
- Vindarnas barn (The boy of the winds. 1991) novel
- Ljusets hotell (Clarity Hotel. 1991), poetry collection
- Den första kärleken (The first love. 1991) short stories
- Tystnad och eko (Silence and echo. 1994) novel
- Svalornas tid (Time of swallows. 1996) short stories
- Sand. (1997) poetry collection
- Eget liv (Own life 2000) novel
- Drömmen om ett liv (A dreamed Life) novel
- Honungsvargar (Honey wolves) novel
- Nattens årstid (The night season) novel
- Evighetens stränder (Eternity ends. 2001), novel
