= Anna Borgeryd =

Swedish entrepreneur, author, and blogger (1969–2019)

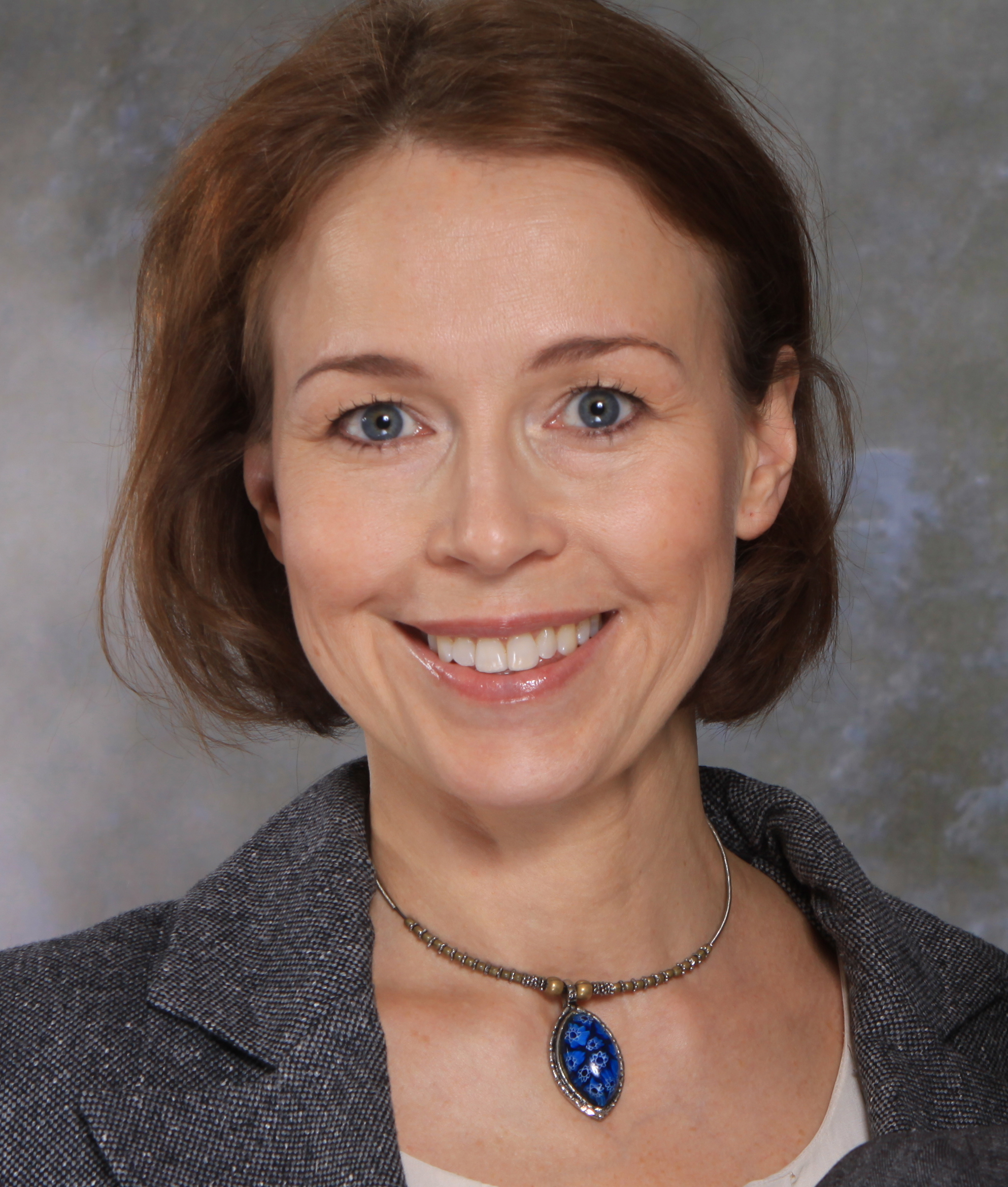
- Born: Anna Margareta Jonsson Borgeryd; 2 May 1969
- Died: 18 February 2019 (aged 49)
- Title: Chief Strategy Officer

Anna Borgeryd (2 May 1969 – 18 February 2019) was a Swedish entrepreneur, author and blogger. She was Chief Strategy Officer of Polarbrödsgruppen.

== Biography ==
Anna Borgeryd studied Political Science and Peace and Conflict Studies at Umeå University. Her Ph.D. dissertation, Managing Intercollective Conflict: Prevailing Structures and Global Challenges focused on conflict management in both theory and practice. In her role as Chief Strategy Officer at Polarbrödsgruppen she was part of the fifth generation to lead her family’s company. She also served as advisor to the Government of Sweden’s Commission on the Future.

Borgeryd made her debut as a writer of fiction in 2013 with the novel Thin Walls. The novel is based on her film manuscript, which was awarded Film in Västerbotten's manuscript award in 2000. In 2004, the manuscript was the basis for the short film Family Soul, for which Borgeryd also wrote the music. Family Soul was named best manuscript and best film at the 2004 Västerbottens Film Festival VAFF. Anna wrote the blog Wood and Blue and owned and operated her own production company, Globalans AB.

In 2012, Borgeryd, together with her sister Karin Jonsson Bodin, was nominated for the Beautiful Business Award. The magazine S has featured the sisters in their list of Power Sibling and in 2013 they were named Norrland's foremost entrepreneurs in the Entrepreneur of the Year contest. In 2018 the sisters were awarded another prize from EY Entrepreneur of the Year, the honourable Family Business Award.

Borgeryd was a member of the jury that awards the annual Utstickarpriset.

Anna Borgeryd's TEDx lecture The Dawn of a New Economy is sometimes called The Dashboard of the World TED-talk. She was one of the nominees for Hottest in Almedalen 2013. She contributed to the anthology Swearing in Church: Twenty-four voices of eternal growth on a finite planet, with the chapter: "We need sustainable living, not pseudo growth". Her article "Investment Guide for Sustainable Entrepreneurship" has been published in a Greenpeace anthology. In spring 2014, she was ranked 15 on the list of Sweden's most powerful environmentalists. Also in 2014, Borgeryd received the Great Renewal Prize in recognition of Polarbrödsgruppens investment in wind power and its commitment to being an example of a company that is both profitable and an agent for societal transformation to sustainability. In 2015 she made Greenpeace’s list of Women in the know about the environment and climate and received Umeå municipality's environmental award on behalf of the family’s company.

== Death ==
Borgeryd died on 18 February 2019, at the age of 49.
