= Elisabet Anrep-Nordin =

Principal of the school for the blind and deaf

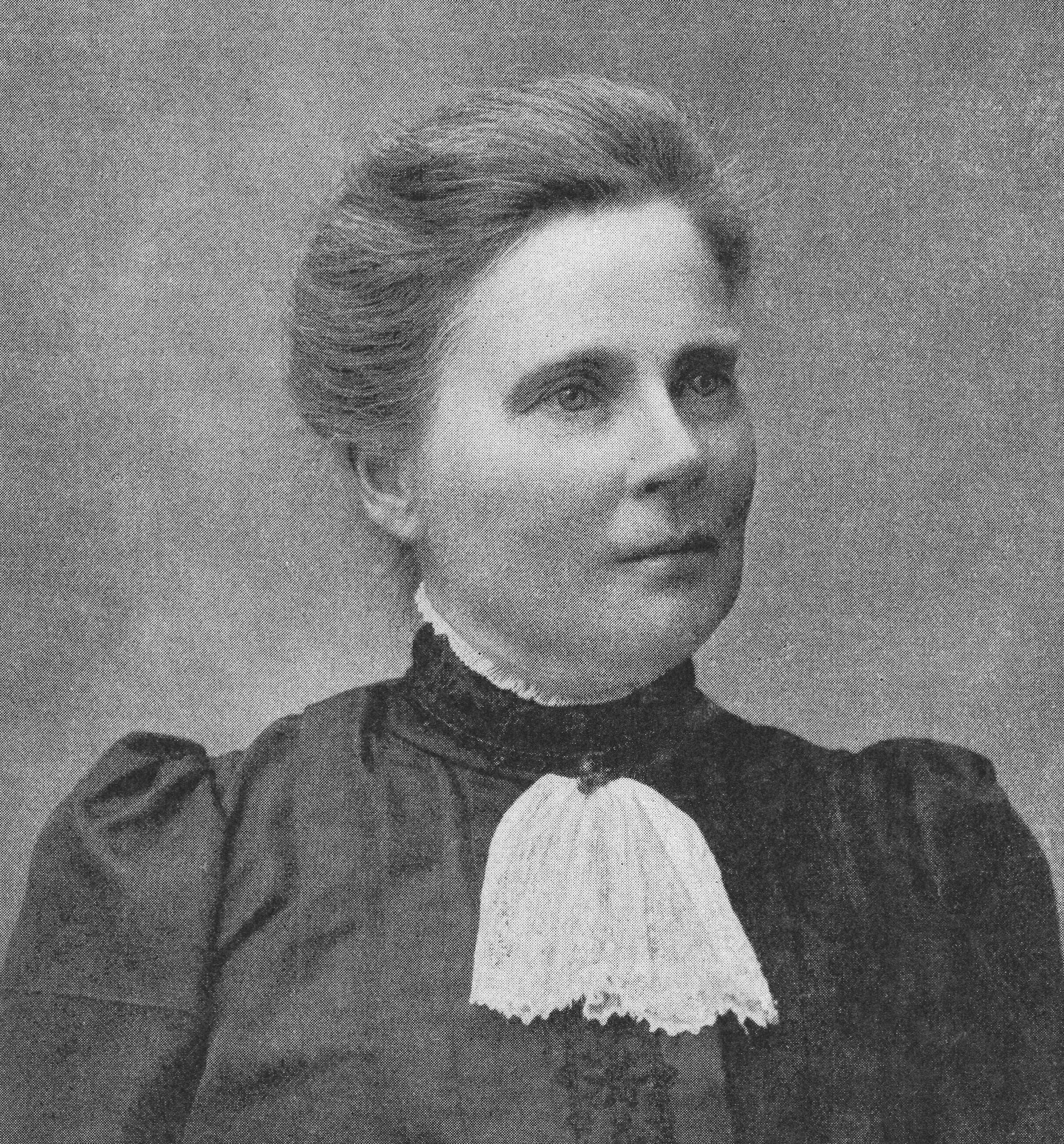
- Anrep-Nordin on the cover of a Swedish magazine, Hvar 8 Dag, in 1909.
- Born: 21 April 1857; Skultuna
- Died: 10 August 1947; Lerum Älvborgs län Västergötland
- Occupation(s): Educator, city councillor

Elisabet Anrep-Nordin (21 April 1857 – 10 August 1947), was a Swedish educator and principal of a school for blind and deaf students from 1886 to 1921. She was also elected to the city council of Vänersborg in 1910.

== Early life ==
Elisabet Anrep was born in 1857 in Skultuna, the oldest daughter of the eight children of nobleman Frans Gustav Anrep and Julia Ulrika Elisabet Mörner af Morlanda. Her uncle was genealogist Johan Gabriel Anrep. She was the first woman in Sweden trained as a pedagogue for deaf students, graduating in 1877.

== Career ==
Anrep-Nordin initially worked as a swim teacher at Manillaskolan, a school for the deaf, which led to her interest in becoming an educator for the blind and deaf. She is regarded as a pioneer in her field and was the founder of Skolhemmet för blinda dövstumma ('School Home for the Blind Deafmute'), renamed the Drottning Sofias stiftelse ('Queen Sophia Foundation') in Skara, and its principal in from 1886 1921. She visited Perkins School for the Blind in Boston in 1886, to study the methods used to educate Laura Bridgman and other deafblind students there. She attended and spoke at an international conference on deaf education at the 1904 Louisiana Purchase Exposition in St. Louis, and met with Helen Keller and First Lady Edith Roosevelt. She lectured on her work, and helped to found the Association for the Care of Adult Blind People in Sweden.

Anrep-Nordin belonged to the first cohort of women city councillors. She was elected to the Vänersborg City Council in the election of 1910, the first year women were eligible.

== Personal life ==
Elisabet Anrep married the deaf educator Pehr Fredrik Stanislaus Nordin in 1879, in Stockholm. He died in 1920. They had four children, including her eldest son, Gösta, who was a medical student when he died in New York in 1904, and Birger Anrep-Nordin (1888–1946), a musician and composer. Anrep-Nordin died in 1947, aged 90 years, in Västergötland.
