= Thora Thersner =

Swedish artist (1818–1867)

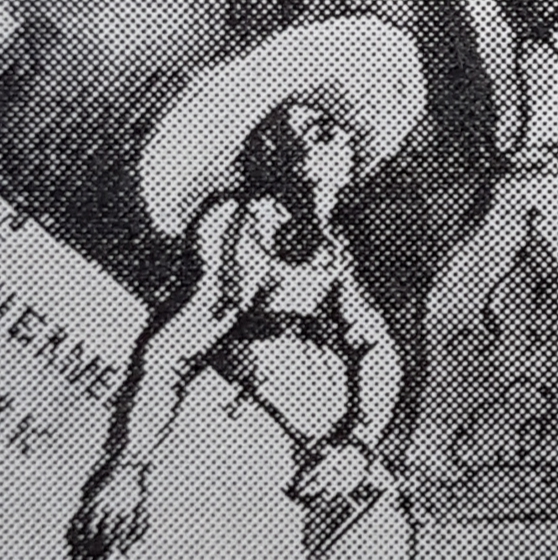
- Thora Thersner by Fritz von Dardel
- Born: Thora Johanna Ulrika Thersner; 24 December 1818; Stockholm, Sweden
- Died: 3 October 1867 (aged 48); Stockholm, Sweden
- Notable work: Fordna och närvarande Sverige

Thora Johanna Ulrika Thersner (24 December 1818 – 3 October 1867) was a Swedish graphic artist and illustrator who was known for contributing half of the illustrations of the Fordna och närvarande Sverige topographical volumes, which her father began.

== Early life ==
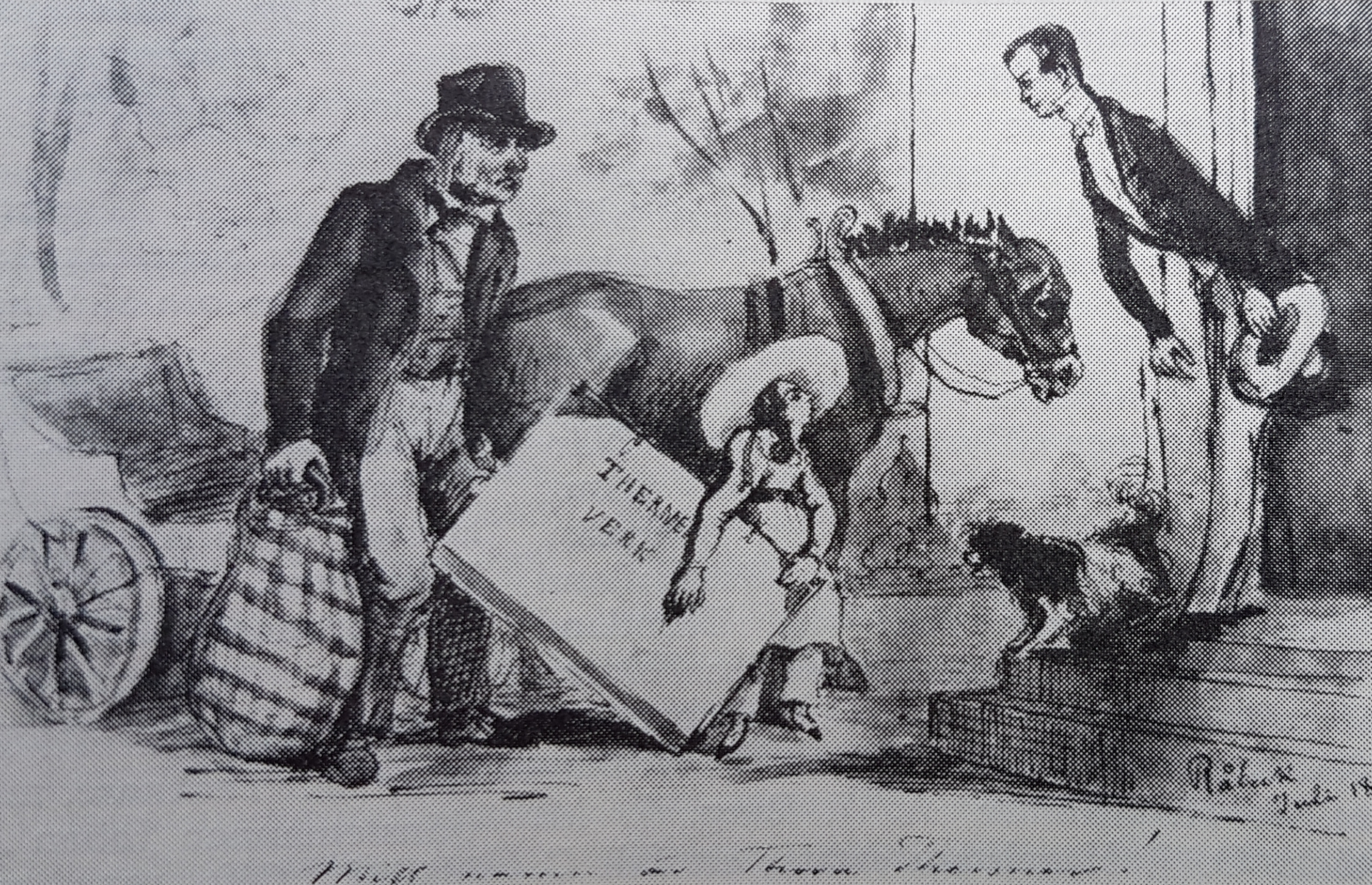
Thora Thersner illustrated by Fritz von Dardel

Thora Johanna Ulrika Thersner was born in Stockholm on 24 December 1818 (Note: According to the Svenskt kvinnobiografiskt lexikon, however the same article also states that she was born on 24 September 1818) to Anna Gustafva Wechmann and the Finnish artist Lieutenant-Colonel Ulrik Thersner. She had two sisters: Anna Hilda Antigon and Edmea Mildehjert Arurora.

She received private art lessons as a young child after she showed an aptitude for art, and mainly focused on drawing figures.

== Career ==
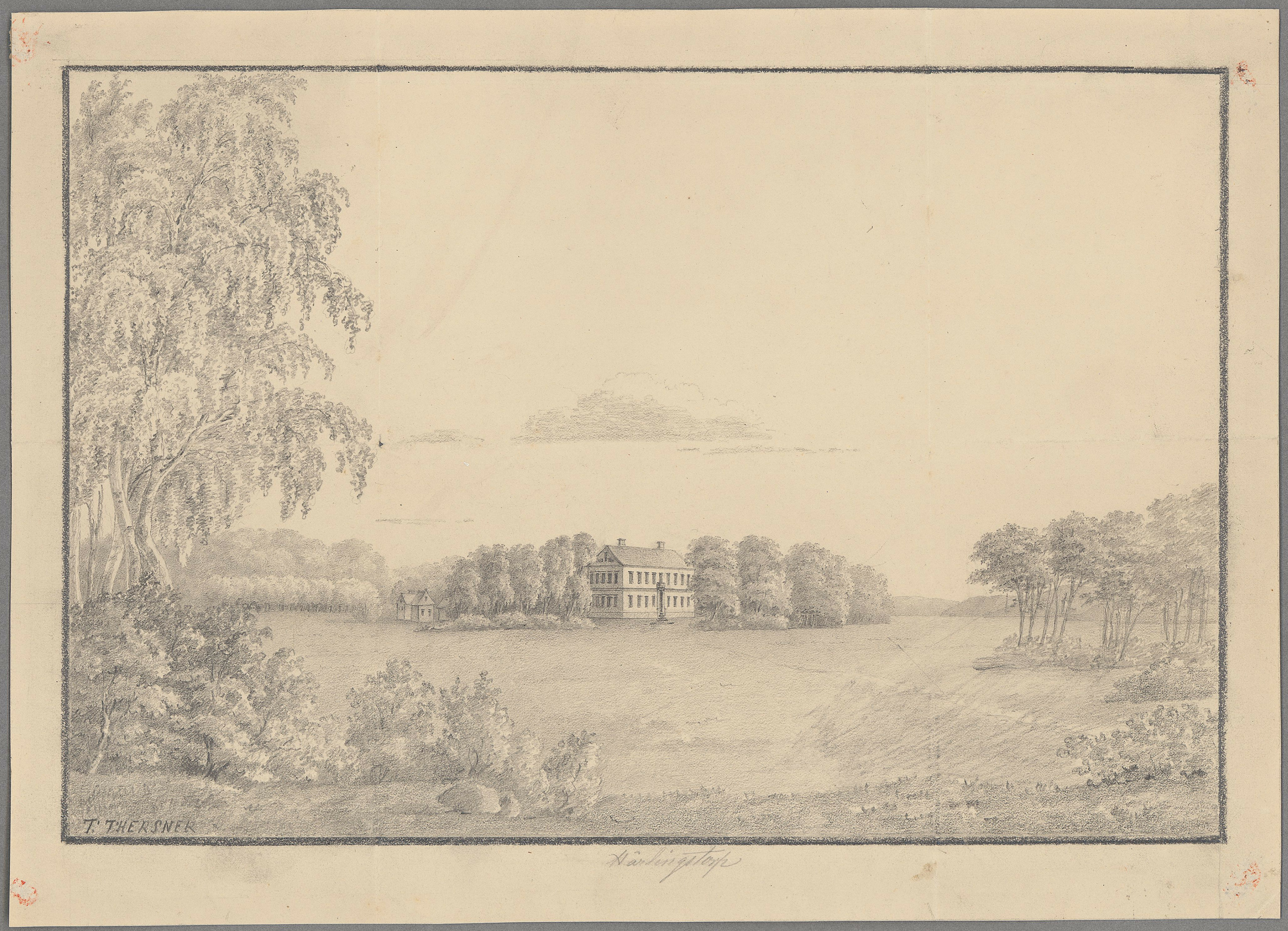
View of Härlingstorp and its surroundings drawn by Thora Thersner

Thersner's father died when she was ten years old. At the time of his death, he was working on a comprehensive volume of topographical illustrations of Swedish landscapes as well as old and modern Swedish buildings. He had only completed the volumes on Östergötland and Scania provinces. His work on Uppland and Södermanland had been begun before his death but was completed by others. After his death, Major (later Superintendent) Anckarsvärd assumed responsibility for the late Thersner's work on behalf of his estate.

In 1843, the Major suggested that Thora should continue her father's work, despite her lack of experience drawing landscapes. She found her first attempt at landscape drawing on paper more successful than anticipated, so she decided to undertake work on the volumes herself, under Anckarsvärd supervision. Apart from Södermanland and Uppland, which were worked on by others, she drew the remaining provinces. However in 1845, she became solely responsible for its completion, and after her mother's death, the volumes were her only source of income. Thersner travelled throughout Sweden to create illustrations based on her surroundings for the volumes and continued working on them for the remainder of her life. She received a small government grant to work on the volumes. She was also included in the Konstakademien exhibition in 1836, with a number of her illustrations.

== Death and legacy ==
Thersner never married and spent her entire life living and working in Stockholm. She died there on 3 October 1867, aged 48. After her death, work ceased on Fordna och närvarande Sverige, with Thersner having completed 9 volumes with 364 illustrations. In connection with the notice of her death in the newspaper Stockholms Dagblad, it was established that her work to spread knowledge about Sweden had earned her the right to be remembered. Currently she is represented at the Värmland Museum among others.
