= Marie-Louise af Forsell =

Marie-Louise af Forsell or Marie-Louise Forsell (5 September 1823 – 3 April 1852), was a Swedish noblewoman diarist. She wrote a diary from the age of sixteen to her death in childbirth at the age of twenty-nine. Her diary was published in four parts by Syster Heijkenskjöld between 1914 and 1917. They became a big success when they were published, and are considered a valuable historical depiction of the everyday conventional life of a Swedish noblewoman in the mid-19th century.

== Life ==
She was born to the nobleman colonel Carl af Forsell and Clementina Magdalena Geijer. In 1847, she married lieutenant Berndt Otto Nycander (1811–1869), with whom she had four children.

Marie-Louise af Forsell lived a conventional life representative of a woman of the gentry. She was educated in a girls' school, and spent her childhood in her parents' home in Stockholm and in the country estate of her maternal grandfather, Yxe manor in Bergslagen. The first part of her published journal describes her life as a young girl, participating with her family in a social life filled with receptions in the manors of the gentry.

The second part describes her life as an unmarried woman on the marriage market in the high society life of the Stockholm upper class, her wedding and her first years as a married woman. In 1847, she married lieutenant Berndt Otto Nycander (1811–1869), after having first been in love with the actor Johan Jolin. Her marriage was considered suitable, but the differences between the factually dry and scientific Berndt Otto and the romantic and literary interested Marie-Louise appears to have resulted in her focusing most of her affection on her son rather than her husband, and she expressed frustration over having to attend household duties which took her away from her literary interests.

The third part describes her life as a married gentry woman, spending the summer in the family country estate with her female relatives, devoting her days to needlework, piano playing, conversation, walks in the garden and reading of novels; and participating in the balls, suppers, receptions and visits of the gentry.

The fourth and last part of her diary describes her life as a married woman of high society, devoting her time in the city to visit the church, the theatre and participating in charity, as well as visiting health resorts such as Porla and Marstrand. During her five years of marriage, she gave birth to four children, all the time in great fear of delivery and fearing to die in childbirth. During her last pregnancy, she described her upcoming delivery with the words: "with a terrifying shudder, I now await death". Two weeks after this note, she did indeed die during the birth of her fourth and last child, who was born dead.

== Works ==
- En resa i familjevagn år 1842. ['A Journey in the family carriage in 1842'] Stockholm: Bonnier. 1914. Libris länk
- Sällskapslif och hemlif i Stockholm på 1840-talet : ur Marie-Louise Forsells dagboksanteckningar. ['Society life and Every day life in Stockholm in the 1840s: from the journals of Marie-Louise Forsell'] Stockholm. 1915. Libris länk
- Herrgårdslif i Bergslagen för sjuttio år sedan. ['Life in the manors of Bergslagen seventy years ago'] Stockholm: Bonnier. 1916. Libris länk
- I Stockholm och på sommarnöje 1849-1852 : Marie-Louise Forsells sista dagboksanteckningar. ['In Stockholm and on the country estate in 1849-1852: the last journals of Marie-Louise Forsell'] Stockholm. 1917.
