= Ann-Charlotte Alverfors =

Swedish writer

Ann-Charlotte Alverfors (23 January 1947 – 20 March 2018) was a Swedish writer. She was best known for her autobiographical trilogy, which became the basis for a six-episode miniseries, titled Sparvöga (lit. Sparrow-eye), in 1989.

The daughter of Tor Alverfors and Margaret Andersson, she was born in Eksjö and was educated at a folk high school. In 1972, she published a collection of poetry Paternosterhissar; she published a second collection, Jönköping 6 in 1975. Alverfos authored a trilogy of autobiographical novels: Sparvöga (1975), Hjärteblodet (1976) and Snabelros (1977); the novels formed the basis for a television series. She lived in Uppsala.

Alverfos was married to professor Arnulf Merker, who died in 2010.

== Selected works ==
- Aldrig, novel (1993), received the Swedish Trade Union Confederation cultural prize and the Martin Koch Prize
- Barn av samma ögonblick, novel (2000)
- Vem ska trösta Gösta?, illustrated novel (2007)
