= 1931 in Sweden =

- Decades: 1910s; 1920s; 1930s; 1940s; 1950s
- See also: Other events of 1931; Timeline of Swedish history

Events from the year 1931 in Sweden

== Incumbents ==
- Monarch – Gustaf V
- Prime Minister – Carl Gustaf Ekman

== Events ==
- 14 May – The Ådalen shootings: During a general strike in Ådalen, military troops fired gunshots into a crowd of demonstrants. Five persons were killed in the massacre, and five were injured.

== Births ==
- 24 January – Lars Hörmander, mathematician (died 2012)
- 31 March – Göran Printz-Påhlson, writer (died 2006)
- 15 April – Tomas Tranströmer, poet (died 2015)
- 23 June – Ola Ullsten, politician (died 2018)
- 16 July – Kjell Hansson, Olympic rower (died 2019)
- 23 July – Jan Troell, filmmaker
- 28 August – Sven Tumba, ice hockey player (died 2011).
- 16 December – Lasse Björn, ice hockey player (died 2024)

== Deaths ==
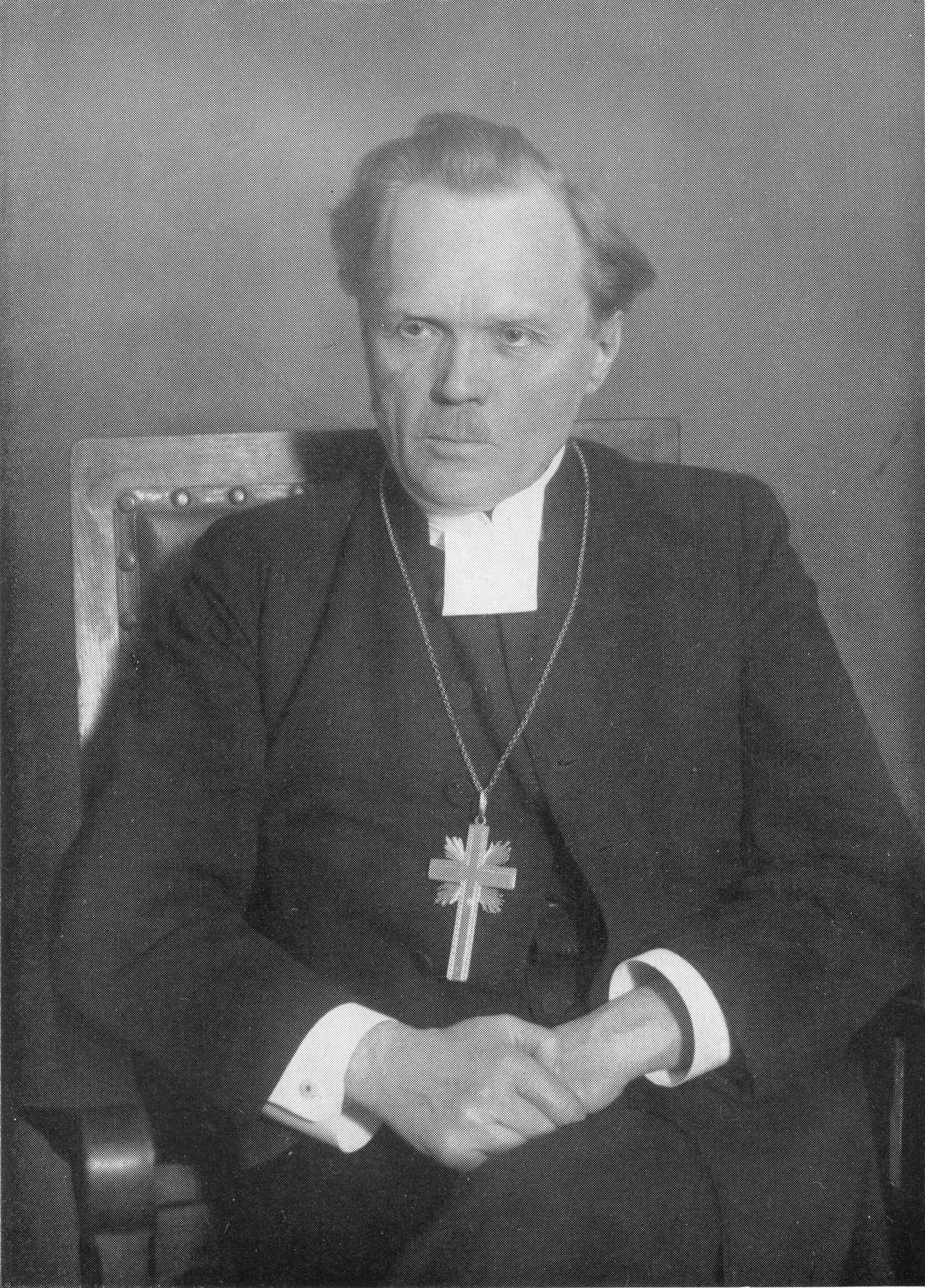
Nathan Söderblom, Archbishop of Uppsala, recipient of the Nobel Peace Prize 1930

- 8 April – Erik Axel Karlfeldt, poet (born 1864)
- 26 May – Anna Sandström, feminist
- 16 June – Lucie Lagerbielke, writer and painter (born 1865).
- 12 July – Nathan Söderblom, clergyman, archbishop (born 1866)
- 13 October – Ernst Didring, writer (born 1868)
