= Jenny Brandt =

Swedish ballet dancer

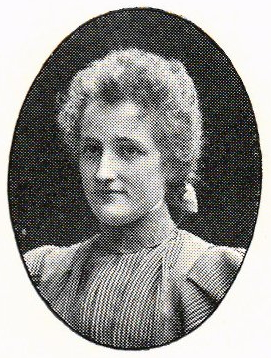
- Born: Jenny Augusta Elisabeth Brandt; 13 December 1867; Stockholm, Sweden
- Died: 17 April 1933 (aged 65)
- Occupations: dancer, ballerina
- Years active: 1888-1902

Jenny Augusta Elisabeth Brandt (13 December 1867, Stockholm- 17 April 1933), was a Swedish ballerina.

She was a student at the Royal Swedish Ballet, became a student premier dancer in 1888, and was a premier dancer (ballerina) in 1889–1902. Her noted roles include a youth in Undina, "Franz" in Coppelia and the abbess in Robert. She also performed in Brudköpet (The Bartered Bride), Gioconda, Hungary, Pas des manteaux (No Coats), Slavisk bröllops lek (Slavic Wedding Party), and William Tell. Upon her marriage, she retired from the stage.

In 1902, Brandt married the mining engineer Karl Hjalmar Nordquist (5 August 1872–3 April 1944). They had a son, Nils Gustav Nordqvist (1904–1999), who was a printer and manager of a printing house.
