= Anders Åberg (artist) =

Swedish sculptor, painter, and cartoonist (1945–2018)

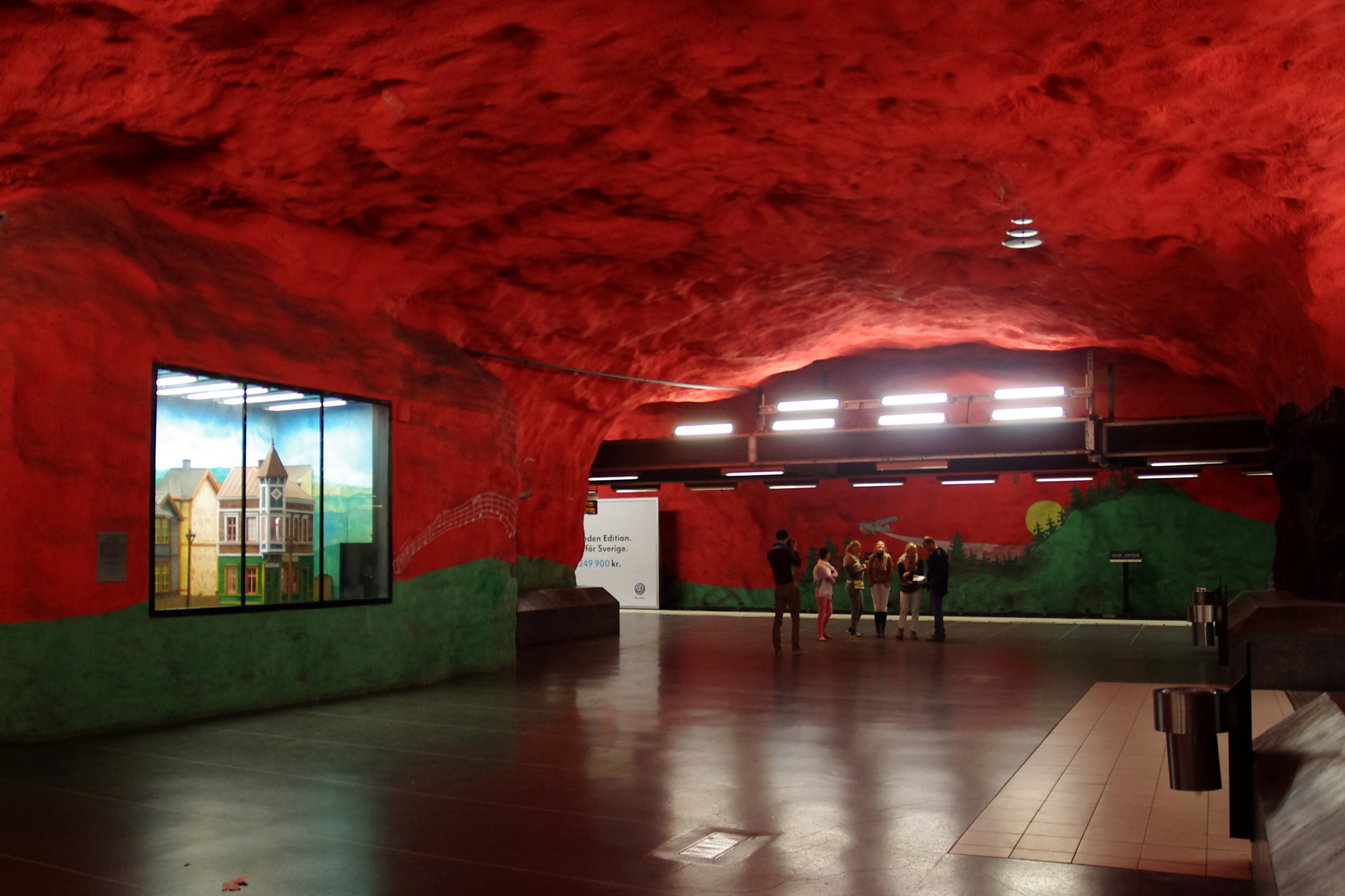
Anders Åberg and Karl-Olov Björk were assigned to artistically decorate the Stockholm Metro station Solna centrum (1975)

Per Anders Åberg (16 April 1945 – 23 January 2018) was a Swedish sculptor, painter and cartoonist. Åberg was best known for his wooden models of all sorts of buildings. In the early 1970s, he was assigned to decorate the Stockholm Metro station Solna centrum. In 1980, Åberg founded the Mannaminne museum, an outdoor art museum in Nordingrå, Sweden.
