= Ebba De la Gardie =

Swedish journalist

- Born: 27 June 1867; Sweden
- Died: 16 December 1928 (aged 61)
- Occupation: Journalist
- Known for: One of the first society reporters in Sweden

Ebba De la Gardie (27 June 1867 – 16 December 1928) was a Swedish journalist. She has been called the first society reporter in Sweden. As a journalist, she was known under her signature Comtesse G..

She was the daughter of count Axel Otto De la Gardie and Fredrika Christina Falkenberg af Bålby. She wrote articles about fashion and high society for a number of papers such as Stockholms Dagblad, Svenska Dagbladet, Stockholms-Tidningen and the culture magazines Saisonen and Arte et Martei from about 1900 onward. She made regular trips to Paris, and was known for her sharp tongue in regard to the excesses of fashion.

She was mentioned by Hjalmar Söderberg in The Serious Game.
