= Mor Kerstin i Stämmemand-Kinna =

Kerstin Andersdotter (1774–1852), known as Mor Kerstin i Stämmemand-Kinna (Mother Kerstin of Stämmemand-Kinna), was a Swedish textile industrialist.

She was an important figure within the Swedish textile industry, managing a major cotton industry through the putting-out system in around the countryside of Kinna in Västergötland. In 1840, 80 percent of all cotton textiles sold from Sweden was sold from the Kinna area. She played an important part in the beginning of the industrialization of Sweden, which largedly originated from the putting-out system textile industry, when it started to manufacture cotton textile in precisely her area in this time period. Her son Sven Erikson was to become one of the major industrialists in Sweden.

== Life ==
She was born in the rural area of Kinna as the daughter of the wealthy farmer Anders Jonsson and Elin Larsdotter, and married in 1800 to the wealthy farmer Erik Andersson (1772–1813). Her husband was the owner of the farm Stämmemand in Kinna, hence her own soubriquet. She had five children: two sons (one surviving to adulthood) and three daughters.

=== Business ===
Both her father and her spouse were active as entrepreneurial farmers within the textile putting-out system, and her mother managed her own money lending business. She was to follow all of their examples.

In 1813, when she became a widow and thereby of legal majority (which made her business activity visible in official documentation), she took over the textile putting-out system manufacture business of both her father and her late spouse. She also started banking by money lending.

This was at a point in time when the putting-out system had its breakthrough from small scale business to large scale industrial enterprises, when the farmers managing textile putting-out system businesses started to manufacture cotton as their preferred textile, resulting in rapid expansion of their business and the expansion of the putting-out system to major industries. She was one example of those who developed her manufacture to a major business industry. The Kinna area became the center of the Swedish cotton industry in the time period when she was active, and she is noted to have been the perhaps first putting-out system-manager who started to produce cotton rather than linen. She became one of the major manufacturers with thousands of home weavers in her employ. She continued her business activity until her death, for almost forty years.

She was the mother of the cotton industrialist Sven Erikson (1801–1866), although she established her own enterprise previous to that of her son. Her business would be inherited by a daughter and son-in-law of hers.

In 1842, she was awarded with a golden chain from King Charles XIV John of Sweden as a recognition for her industrial enterprise within the Swedish cotton industry as well as for encouraging the public diligence within the household with her diligence and personal example.

== Legacy ==
After her death, her farm became a local memorial. A square, as well as a road in Kinna, have been named after her.
