= Dina Edling =

Swedish opera singer (1854–1935)

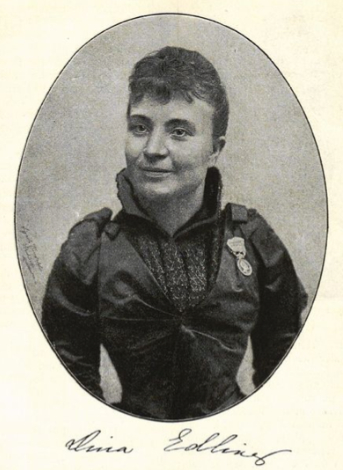
Dina Edling

Dina (Bernhardina) Edling, née Niehoff (14 November 1854 – 9 January 1935) was a Swedish opera singer (mezzo-soprano), singing teacher, and member of the Royal Swedish Academy of Music.

She debuted at the Royal Swedish Opera in Stockholm in 1876, and was employed there in 1877–1892. She was elected to the Royal Swedish Academy of Music in 1885.

She was given Litteris et Artibus in 1890.
