= Joël Blomqvist (hymnwriter) =

Swedish hymnwriter (1840–1930)

Joël Blomqvist (1840 - 1930) was a Swedish hymnwriter.
