= 1986 in Sweden =

- Decades: 1960s; 1970s; 1980s; 1990s; 2000s
- See also: Other events of 1986; Timeline of Swedish history

Events from the year 1986 in Sweden

== Incumbents ==
- Monarch – Carl XVI Gustaf
- Prime Minister – Olof Palme, Ingvar Carlsson

== Events ==
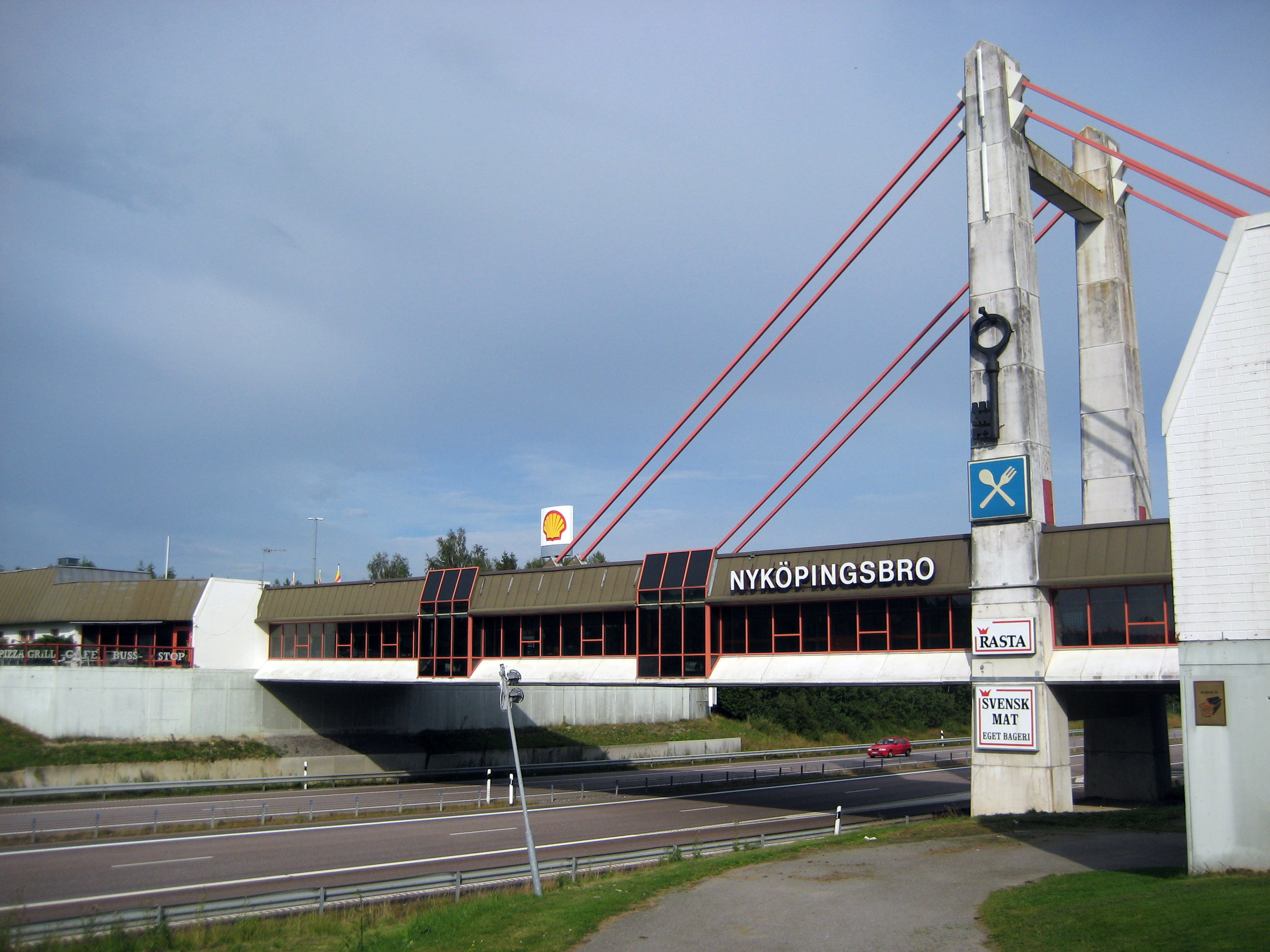
Nyköpingsbro was inaugurated in October.

- 3 January – Kungsörnen's mill (Saltsjöqvarn) in Stockholm burns down for a whole day.
- 28 February – Assassination of Olof Palme.
- October - Covered bridge restaurant Nyköpingsbro, southwest of Nyköping, is inaugurated.

== Births ==
- 15 February - Adam Lundgren, actor
- 9 February - Björn Gustafsson, comedian and actor
- 23 February - Ola Svensson, singer.
- 8 April - Carl Klingborg, bandy player.
- 9 June - Kevin Borg, Maltese-born singer.
- 13 June - Måns Zelmerlöw, singer.
- 3 July – Ola Toivonen, footballer
- 6 August – Nanna Blondell, Swedish-Ghanaian actress
- 10 August – Tibor Joza, footballer.
- 17 August – Marcus Berg, footballer
- 1 October – Filip Björk, professional ice hockey player
- 17 October – Mohombi, Congolese-Swedish singer
- 9 November – Linnea Henriksson, singer and songwriter
- 13 December – Mikael Lustig, footballer.

== Deaths ==
- 28 February – Olof Palme, Prime Minister (born 1927)
- 24 May – Gunnar Björnstrand, actor (born 1909)
- 20 November – Arne Beurling, mathematician
