= 1979 in Sweden =

- Decades: 1950s; 1960s; 1970s; 1980s; 1990s
- See also: Other events of 1979; Timeline of Swedish history

Events from the year 1979 in Sweden

== Incumbents ==
- Monarch – Carl XVI Gustaf
- Prime Minister – Ola Ullsten, Thorbjörn Fälldin

== Events ==
- 23 February – The comedy film Repmånad, directed by Lasse Åberg, was released in Sweden.
- 23 April – the ABBA album Voulez-Vous released.
- 1 July – Sveriges Television is separated from Sveriges Radio.
- 16 September – The 1979 Swedish general election is held.
- 12 October – Ola Ullsten resigns as Prime Minister of Sweden, and is replaced with Thorbjörn Fälldin.
- Date unknown – 1979 Star World Championships (sailing regatta) are held in Marstrand.

=== Music ===
- Date unknown – Sun Cats Swedish rock & roll band is founded.

== Births ==
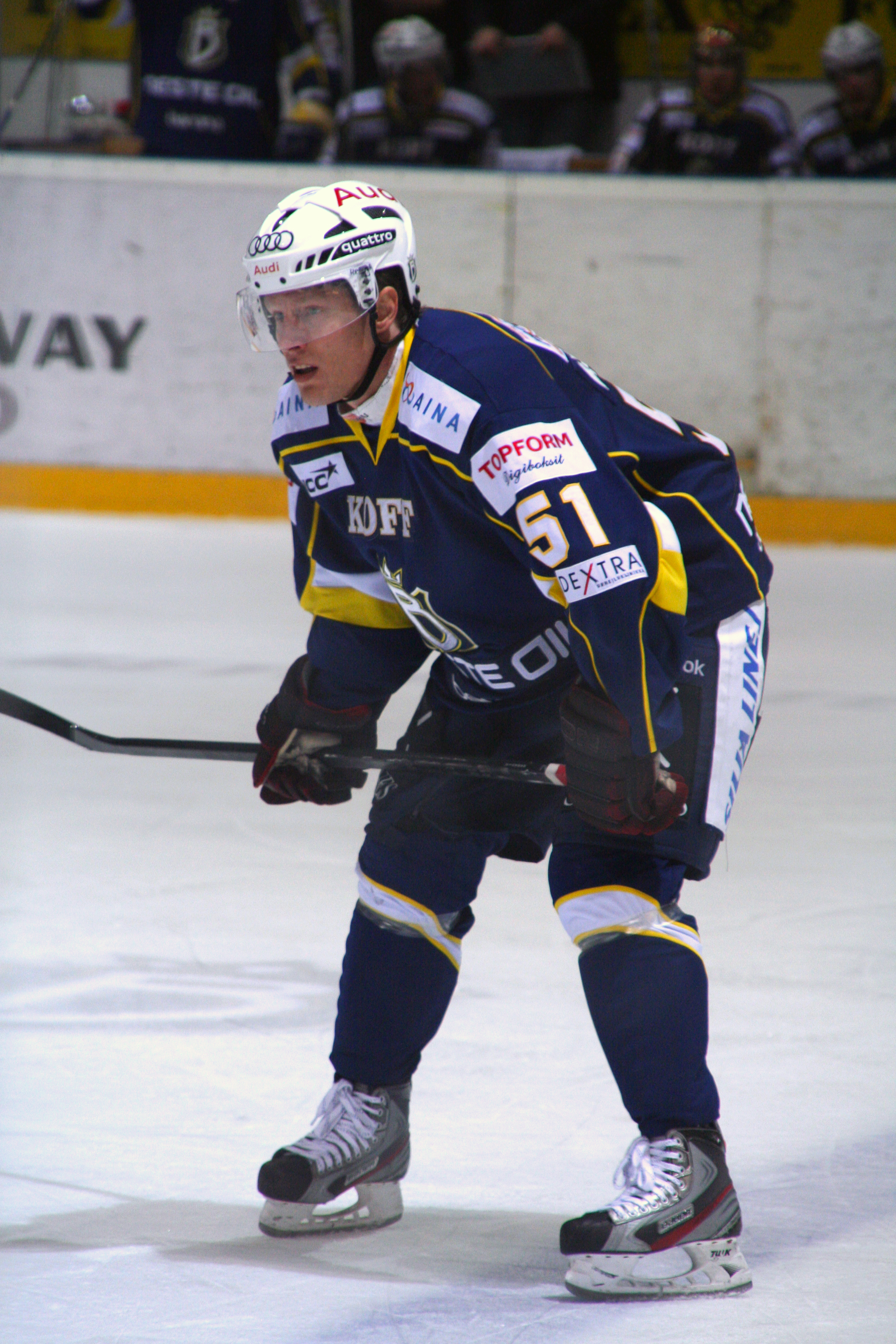
Mika Hannula.

- 8 January – Hanna Ljungberg, international footballer
- 9 January – Markus Larsson, alpine skier
- 10 January – Henrik Tallinder, ice hockey player
- 18 January – Andreas Tegström, footballer
- 29 January – Andreas Thorstensson, entrepreneur
- 23 February – Sascha Zacharias, actress
- 2 March – Kristina Ohlsson, author
- 5 March – Martin Axenrot, death metal drummer
- 21 March – Fredrik Berglund, footballer
- 2 April – Mika Hannula, ice hockey player.
- 8 April – Erika Holst, ice hockey player
- 21 April – Tobias Linderoth, Footballer
- 13 May – Prince Carl Philip, Duke of Värmland
- 17 May – Jimmie Åkesson, politician
- 18 May – Jens Bergensten, video game programmer
- 24 May – Dalibor Doder, handballer.
- 1 June – Markus Persson, video game programmer
- 12 June – Robyn, singer
- 29 June – Erik Lindeberg, sprint canoeist
- 19 September – Mikael Tellqvist, former ice hockey player
- 22 September – MyAnna Buring, actress
- 2 October – Maja Ivarsson, singer-songwriter.
- 2 November – Maria Rooth, ice hockey player
- 25 November – Joel Kinnaman, actor
- 2 December – Joachim Persson, bandy player
- 8 December – Christian Wilhelmsson, footballer
- 21 December – Tuva Novotny, actress
- 23 December – Johan Franzén, ice hockey player
- 28 December – Noomi Rapace, actress

== Deaths ==
- 4 August – Ivar Johansson, wrestler (born 1903).
- 31 October – Edvin Adolphson, film actor and director (born 1893).
- 17 November – Anders Ek, actor (born 1916)
