= 1976 in Sweden =

- Decades: 1950s; 1960s; 1970s; 1980s; 1990s
- See also: Other events of 1976; Timeline of Swedish history

Events from the year 1976 in Sweden

== Incumbents ==
- Monarch – Carl XVI Gustaf
- Prime Minister – Olof Palme, Thorbjörn Fälldin

== Events ==
- 19 June – King Carl XVI Gustaf marries Silvia Sommerlath.
- 19 September – The 1976 Swedish general election is held.
- 14 October – Following a defeat for the Social Democratic Party of Sweden in the Swedish parliamentary election, Olof Palme resigns as Prime Minister of Sweden and is replaced with Thorbjörn Fälldin.
- 27 November –The Church of Sweden Öxnehaga Church in Öxnehaga near Huskvarna, Sweden is inaugurated.

== Popular culture ==
=== Sports ===
- 23–28 February – The Winter Paralympics are held in Örnsköldsvik.
- 2–7 March – The 1976 World Figure Skating Championships are held in Gothenburg.

=== Music ===
- 11 October – The ABBA album Arrival released.
- Livets teater by Magnus Uggla released.

== Births ==
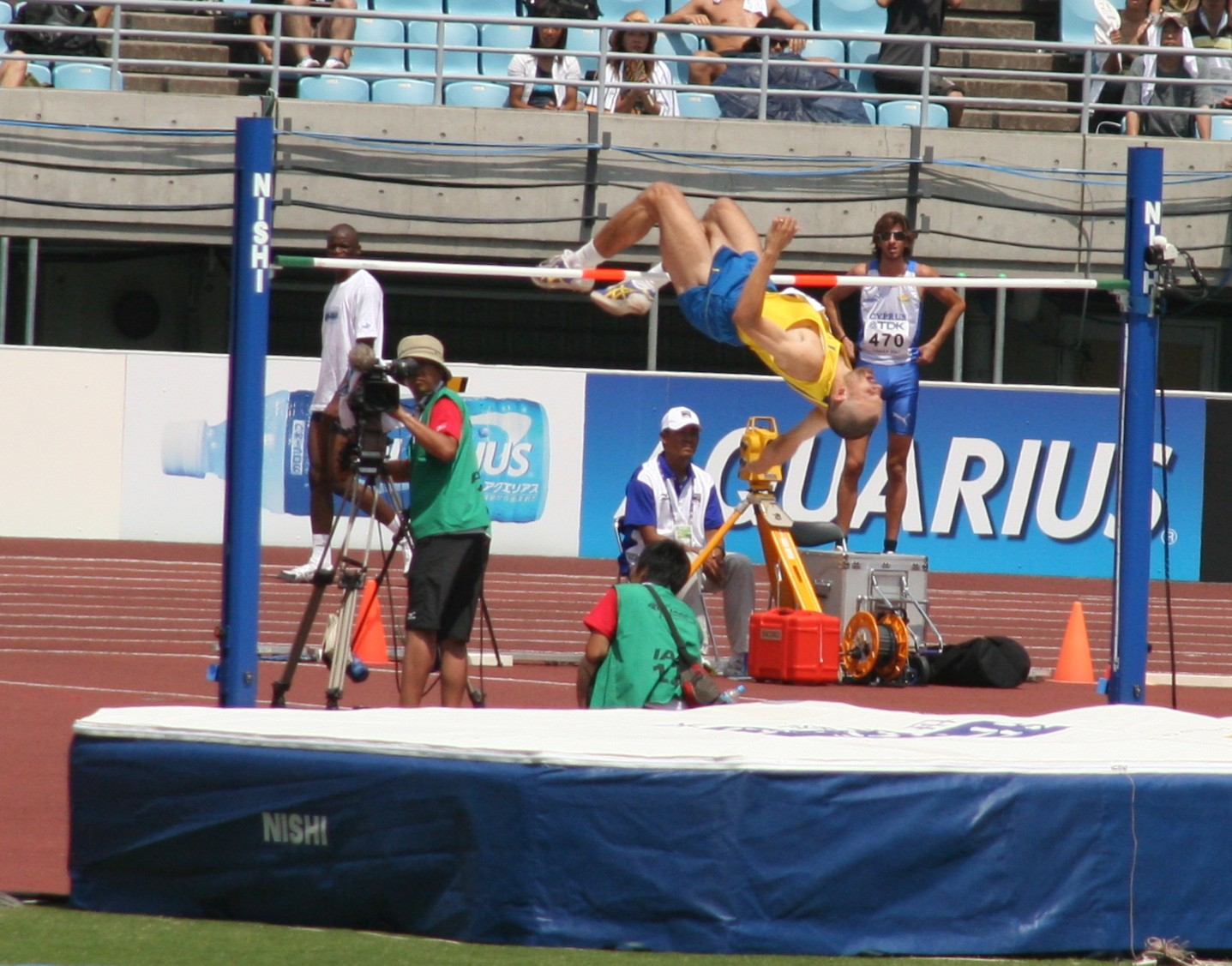
Stefan Holm became Olympic champion in 2004.

- 16 march – Kim Johnsson, Swedish hockey player
- 5 April – Henrik Stenson, golfer
- 16 April – Robert Dahlqvist, Swedish singer-songwriter and guitarist (died 2016)
- 25 May – Stefan Holm, Swedish high jumper.
- 10 June – Patrik Kittel, horse rider.
- 19 July – Eric Prydz, DJ and music producer
- 23 July – Emil Högberg, politician
- 25 August – Alexander Skarsgård, actor
- 12 October – Kajsa Bergqvist, high jumper
- 14 December – Petter Hansson, footballer

=== Date unknown ===
- Henrik Åberg, Swedish singer.
- Gunnar Domeij, former floorball player.

== Deaths ==
- 2 May – Karin Juel, singer, actor and writer (born 1900).
- 24 May – Hugo Wieslander, Olympic athlete (born 1889).
- 28 July – Karin Kock-Lindberg, politician (born 1891).
- 21 December – Karin Ekelund, Swedish actress (born 1913).
