= Social-Demokraten (Chicago newspaper) =

Norwegian and Danish newspaper in Chicago

Social-Demokraten, issue of May 25, 1917, featuring prominent front-page coverage of the anti-war "Manfesto of the Scandinavian Socialist Federation to the Scandinavian Workers in America."

This is about the American newspaper. For the Swedish newspaper see Social-Demokraten. For the Norwegian newspaper see Dagsavisen.

Social-Demokraten (The Social Democrat) was a Norwegian and Danish weekly socialist newspaper published in the United States from 1911 to 1921. The paper was a privately owned entity closely associated with the Scandinavian Socialist Federation of the Socialist Party of America.

In 1921 the name of the publication was changed to The New Age and a transition was made to publication in English. The paper followed the left wing of the Scandinavian Federation into the new Workers Party of America and was relaunched as Voice of Labor, the principal Chicago-based organ of the American Communist movement.

== Publication history ==
=== Establishment ===
The first newspaper published by the Scandinavian Socialist Federation was Svenska Socialisten (The Swedish Socialist), a weekly broadsheet published in the Swedish language and launched in November 1905. This proved satisfactory to the Federation's Swedish-speaking members but the Dano-Norwegian-speaking members of the Federation felt themselves unserved and in need of a press organ of their own.

The decision to launch a combined Dano-Norwegian socialist newspaper in the United States had been made by a pair of the Scandinavian Federation's best organized and most active branches, the Norwegian-American "Skandinavisk Socialist Forening for Chicago og Omegn" (Scandinavian Socialist Association of Chicago and Vicinity) and the Danish-American "Socialistforeningen Karl Marx" (Karl Marx Socialist Organization), both of which were based in Chicago. An initial attempt was made to purchase an already-existing publication called Revyen (The Review). When this effort failed it was decided to launch a wholly new publication, to be called Socialdemokraten (The Social Democrat).

Socialdemokraten was launched in Chicago on October 5, 1911 by the Skandinavisk Socialist Forbund i Amerika (Scandinavian Socialist Federation in America), a language federation of the Socialist Party of America.

The first editor of the paper was Ferdinand "Frans" Hurop, a veteran of the Danish labor movement who on the other side of the Atlantic had previously served as the founder and first president of the Danish Blacksmiths' and Machinists' Union. The publication subsequently served as the official organ of the Scandinavian Federation.

=== Circulation and finances ===
The paper was launched with insufficient financial backing and little prospect for expanding its readership and cash flow. Finances remained tight throughout Social-Demokraten's existence and the paper experienced a fairly rapid turnover of its editors due to a recurring inability of the publishers to pay even the low wages agreed upon. Consequently, the paper was forced to rely upon the direct financial contributions of its readers to survive and a steady stream of fundraising campaigns were conducted in an effort to maintain this support.

The paid circulation of Social-Demokraten was approximately 2,000 at the time of its launch. The press run of the paper seems to have peaked in 1920, when a circulation of 5,000 copies per issue was claimed.

In the spring of 1915 the Scandinavian Federation attempted to economize in the production of its two money-losing publications through the establishment of a new in-house printing firm called the Scandinavian Workers' Publishing Society. Capital was raised for the new venture by the selling of stock at $5 per share. Although nominally independent, actual editorial control remained firmly in the hands of the Scandinavian Federation following the 1915 restructuring.

=== Content ===
The final iteration of Social-Demokraten as an organ of the Scandinavian Federation was as an English-language tabloid called The New Age.

Social-Demokraten included ongoing news coverage and editorial comment about events transpiring in Denmark, Norway, Sweden, and the United States. The publication varied in size from 4 to 8 pages per issue, moving from a broadsheet to a tabloid format during its final phase. The publication also published feature stories, republished works of socialist theory, and printed short stories and short novels in serial form.

=== Political line ===
During the years of American participation in World War I Social-Demokraten followed the pacifist line of the Socialist Party — an attitude which put it into conflict with the Woodrow Wilson administration and its Postmaster General, Albert S. Burleson. This led to the post office seizure of at least two issues in March 1918.

The Norwegian and Danish branches of the Scandinavian Socialist Federation tended to be more radical than the Swedish-language branches of that organization and with the split of the Socialist Party in 1919 into Socialist and Communist wings, the paper followed its editor, N. Juel Christensen into the ranks of the nascent communist movement.

=== Name changes and termination ===
Following the September 1919 Socialist Party split the Scandinavian Federation briefly stood as an independent organization, aloof from the Socialist Party as well as its new rivals, the Communist Labor Party of America and the Communist Party of America. With its subscriber rolls disrupted by the factional war and the red scare which followed, a decision was made to begin running English-language content with a new, more accessible name. On March 18, 1921 Social-Demokraten was rechristened The New World as part of this change. This title instantly drew the ire of a Catholic newspaper by the same name, however, and effective with the very next issue the moniker was switched again, this time to The New Age.

The New Age continued through July 1, 1921, the 503th issue of the publication, at which time the paper's name was changed again, this time to Voice of Labor.

A broken run of Social-Demokraten and its successor publications is available on microfilm from the Illinois State Historical Society.

== Editors ==
- Frans Hurop (October 1911-August 1913; November 1914-November 1916)
- Fossum August (August 1913-August 1914)
- H.A. Fenstad (August to November 1914)
- W.T. Thomsen (November 1916-July 1917)
- Konrad Knudsen (July 1917-December 1918)
- N. Juel Christensen (December 1918-???)
- Arne Swabeck (as "Max Everhart") (1920-1921?)

== See also ==
- Non-English press of the Socialist Party of America
- Non-English press of the Communist Party USA
