= 1975 in Sweden =

- Decades: 1950s; 1960s; 1970s; 1980s; 1990s
- See also: Other events of 1975; Timeline of Swedish history

Events from the year 1975 in Sweden

== Incumbents ==
- Monarch – Carl XVI Gustaf
- Prime Minister – Olof Palme

== Events ==
- 24 April – West German Embassy siege in Stockholm.
- 14 May – The Parliament of Sweden in Stockholm passes an act, encouraging immigrants to keep the language and culture of their native countries.

== Births ==
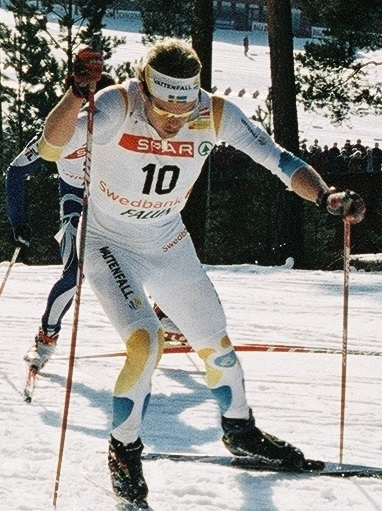
Thobias Fredriksson.

- 20 February – Niclas Wallin, ice hockey player
- 4 April – Thobias Fredriksson, cross country skier.
- 10 April – Rickard Söderberg, tenor, singer and debater
- 15 May – Peter Iwers, rock bassist
- 11 June – Ulrika Bergman, curler.
- 27 August – Björn Gelotte, rock musician
- 9 july – Jessica Folcker, singer
- 9 October – Anders Göthberg, guitarist (died 2008)
- 17 October – Stina Oscarson, theatre director and author (died 2025)
- Unknown date – Peter Söderström, politician

== Deaths ==
- 17 January – Curt Hartzell, gymnast (born 1891).
- 8 September – Erik Adlerz, diver (born 1892), won two Olympic gold medals in 1912.

== See also ==
- 1975 in Swedish television
