= 1978 in Sweden =

- Decades: 1950s; 1960s; 1970s; 1980s; 1990s
- See also: Other events of 1978; Timeline of Swedish history

Events from the year 1978 in Sweden

== Incumbents ==
- Monarch – Carl XVI Gustaf
- Prime Minister – Thorbjörn Fälldin, Ola Ullsten

== Events ==
- 18 October – Thorbjörn Fälldin resigns as Prime Minister of Sweden, and is replaced with Ola Ullsten.

== Births ==
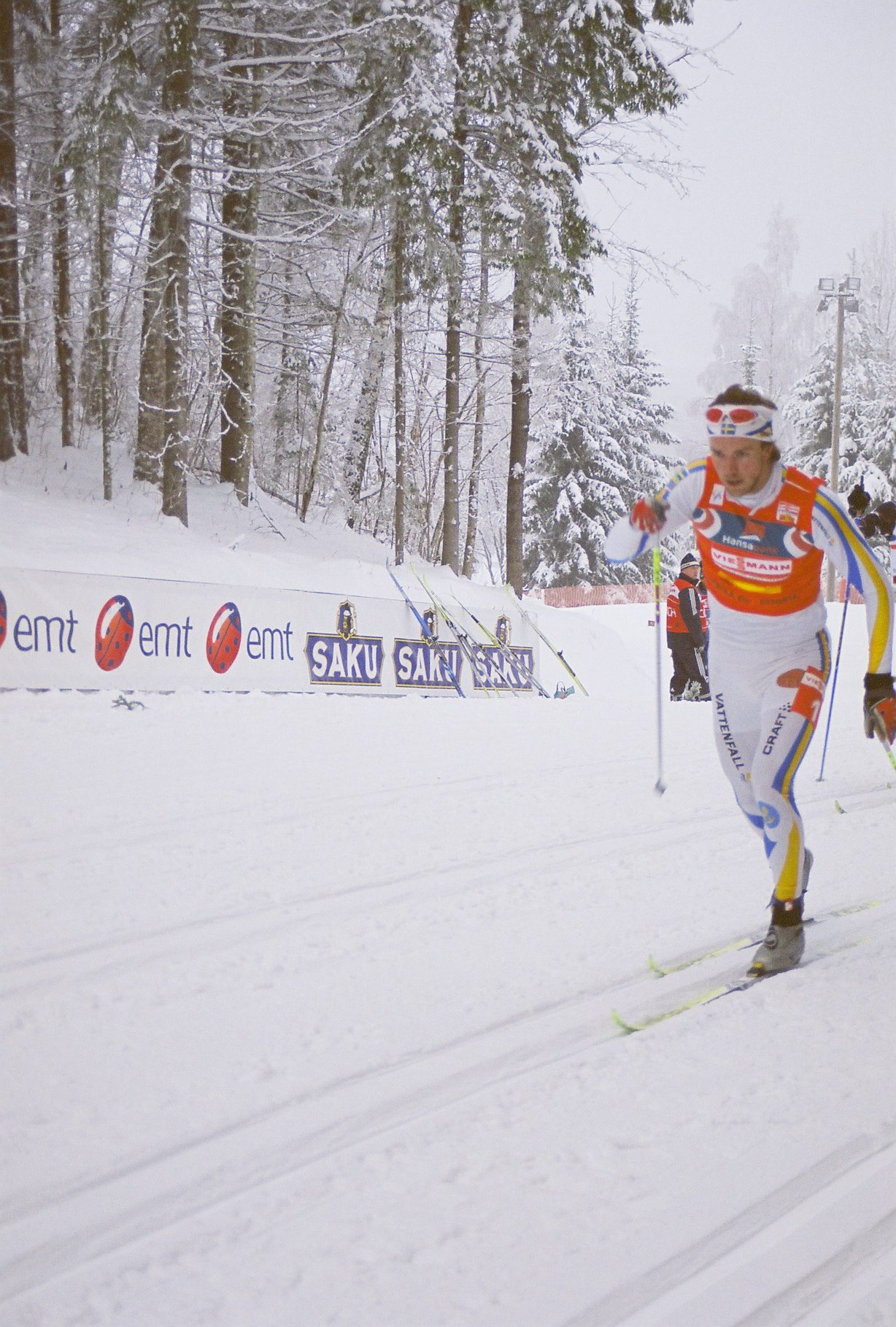
Björn Lind.

- 30 January – Daniel Lindström, singer and winner of Idol 2004 (Sweden)
- 10 February – Isabella Eklöf, screenwriter and film director
- 22 March – Björn Lind, cross country skier.
- 9 May – Jimmy Jansson, politician
- 12 May – Malin Akerman, actress
- 29 May – Pelle Almqvist, singer-songwriter of The Hives
- 7 June – Mini Andén, model
- 1 August – Björn Ferry, biathlete.
- 20 August – Anneli Heed, stand-up comedian, impersonator, and voice actress/dubber

== Deaths ==
- 4 February – Olle Åkerlund, sailor (born 1911).
- 17 February – Erik Charpentier, gymnast (born 1897).
- 3 April – Karl Asplund, poet, short story writer and art historian (born 1890).
- 5 August – Victor Hasselblad, inventor and photographer. (born 1906)
