= Domeij =

Domeij is a surname of Swedish origin. Notable people with the surname include:

- Anna Domeij (born 1987), Swedish curler
- Åsa Domeij (born 1962), Swedish politician
- Gunnar Domeij, Swedish goalkeeper
- Kristoffer Domeij, American soldier
- Sofia Domeij, Swedish biathlete
