= 1984 in Sweden =

- Decades: 1960s; 1970s; 1980s; 1990s; 2000s
- See also: Other events of 1984; Timeline of Swedish history

Events from the year 1984 in Sweden

== Incumbents ==
- Monarch – Carl XVI Gustaf
- Prime Minister – Olof Palme

== Events ==
- 5 May – Herreys won the XXIX Eurovision Song Contest, held in Luxembourg, with the song Diggi-Loo Diggi-Ley, being the second Swedish victory.
- 9 July – Yvonne Riding is elected Miss Universe in Miami, USA, being the third and last Swedish victory.
- Midyear – Murder of Catrine da Costa
- 12 October – The Man from Majorca released
- 29 October – Åke and His World released
- 14 December – Ronia, the Robber's Daughter released

== Births ==
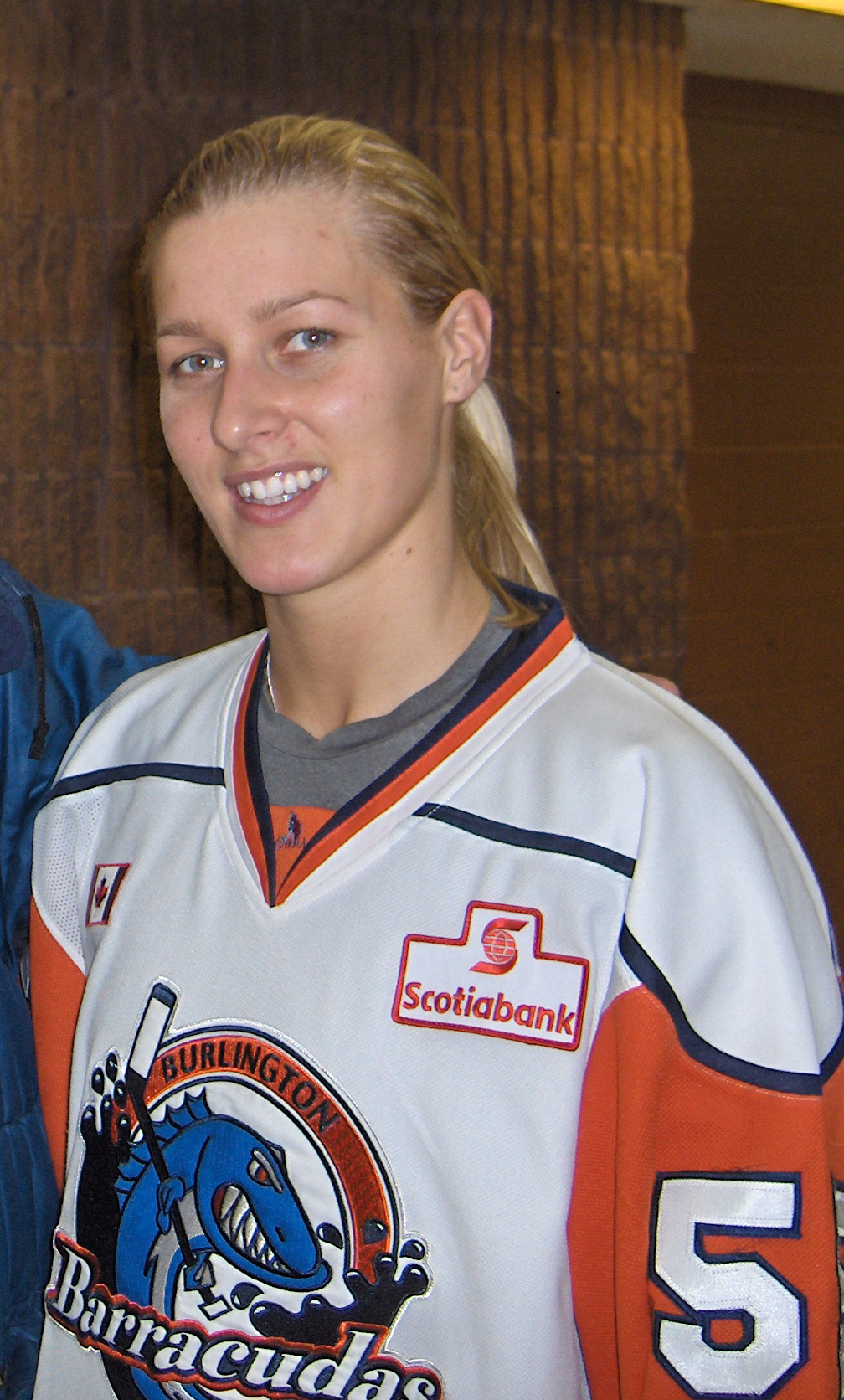
Danijela Rundqvist

- 12 February – Alexandra Dahlström, actress
- 14 February – Eva Berglund, swimmer
- 14 March – Evelina Samuelsson, ice hockey player
- 1 May – Alexander Farnerud, professional footballer
- 8 May – Andreas Mokdasi, athlete
- 30 May – Johan Eklund, football player
- 3 July – Sofia Bleckur, cross-country skier
- 14 August – Robin Söderling, tennis player
- 16 August – Patrik Flodin, rally driver
- 27 August – Hans Olsson, alpine skier.
- 26 September – Danijela Rundqvist, ice hockey player
- 25 October – Sara Lumholdt, singer
- 27 November – Sanna Nielsen, singer and television presenter
- 6 December – Princess Sofia, Duchess of Värmland, princess
- 22 December – Basshunter, singer, record producer and DJ
- Unknown date
  - Elias Aguirre, politician
  - My Rosell, politician

== Deaths ==
- 26 April – Axel Larsson, wrestler (born 1901).
- 9 June – Eric Persson, footballer (born 1898)
- 23 September – Clarence Blum, sculptor (born 1897)
- 28 October – Knut Nordahl, footballer (born 1920)

== See also ==
- 1984 in Swedish television
