= 1985 in Sweden =

- Decades: 1960s; 1970s; 1980s; 1990s; 2000s
- See also: Other events of 1985; Timeline of Swedish history

Events from the year 1985 in Sweden

== Incumbents ==
- Monarch – Carl XVI Gustaf
- Prime Minister – Olof Palme

== Events ==
- 28 March to 7 April – The 1985 World Table Tennis Championships were held in Gothenburg
- 23 August to 1 September – The 1985 World Weightlifting Championships were held in Södertälje
- 15 September – Swedish general election. Olof Palme remains Prime Minister of Sweden following a victory for the Social Democrats.

== Births ==
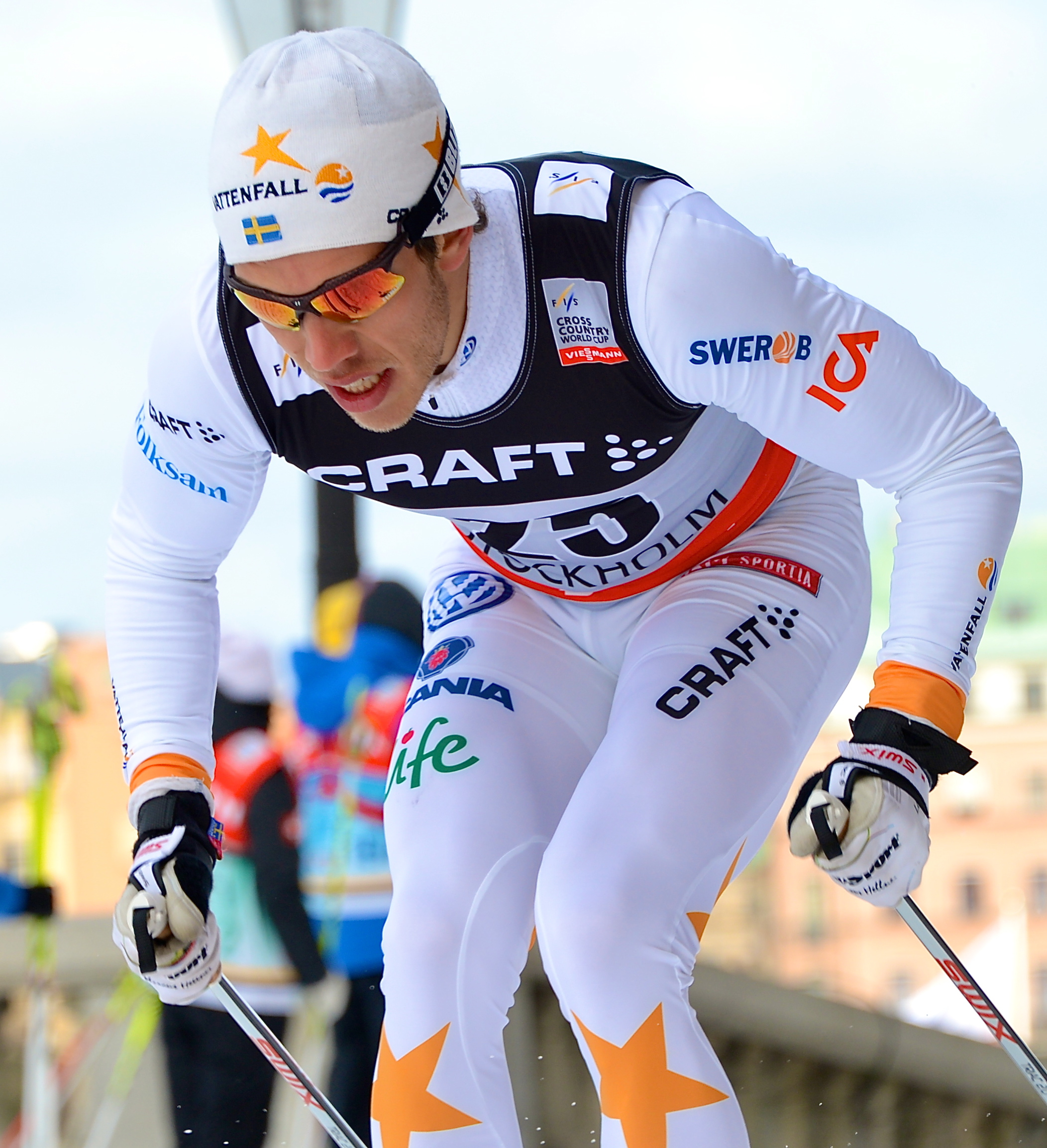
Marcus Hellner

- 14 March – Jessica Samuelsson, heptathlete
- 27 March – Caroline Winberg, model
- 18 May – Johan Eurén, wrestler
- 30 May – Erik Rost, ski orienteer
- 6 June – Sebastian Larsson, footballer
- 10 June – Kristina Lundberg, ice hockey player
- 26 June – Bobo Sollander, footballer
- 27 June – Patrik Fahlgren, handball player
- 27 June – Stina Viktorsson, curler
- 6 July – Niklas Edin, curler
- 28 August – Helena Jansson, orienteer
- 6 September – Elias Granath, ice hockey player
- 17 September – Jimmy Jansson, singer and songwriter
- 11 October – Gabriella Fagundez, swimmer
- 24 October – Oscar Wendt, footballer
- 25 November – Marcus Hellner, cross-country skier
- Unknown date – Nila Vikhe Patil, politician

== Deaths ==
- 3 May – Ruth Forsling, activist and politician (born 1923).
- 3 July – Erik Ågren, boxer (born 1916).
- 27 August – John Albrechtson, sailor, world champion and Olympic champion (born 1936).
- 3 October – Yngve Stoor, singer and composer (born 1912)

== See also ==
- 1985 in Swedish television
