= 1980 in Sweden =

- Decades: 1960s; 1970s; 1980s; 1990s; 2000s
- See also: Other events of 1980; Timeline of Swedish history

Events from the year 1980 in Sweden

== Incumbents ==
- Monarch – Carl XVI Gustaf
- Prime Minister – Thorbjörn Fälldin

== Events ==
- 23 March – Nuclear power referendum
- The Right Livelihood Award established

== Popular culture ==
=== Literature ===
- Vredens barn, novel by Sara Lidman

=== Sport ===
- The 1980 European Figure Skating Championships were held in Gothenburg
- The FIS Nordic World Ski Championships took place in Falun

== Births ==
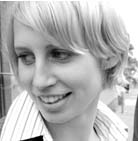
Tove Fraurud

- 5 January – Elin Nordegren, model
- 25 January – Christian Olsson, athlete
- 22 February – Jimmie Ericsson, ice hockey player
- 10 March – Claire Hedenskog, swimmer.
- 19 March – Johan Olsson, cross country skier
- 3 April – Johan Brunström, tennis player
- 4 April – Björn Wirdheim, professional racing driver
- 4 June – Pontus Farnerud, former professional footballer
- 13 June – Linda Wessberg, golf player
- 30 June – Emil Almén, actor
- 30 June – Rade Prica, footballer
- 19 August – Tove Fraurud, politician
- 20 September – Gustav Larsson, cyclist
- 26 September – Daniel and Henrik Sedin, ice hockey players
- 9 October – Henrik Zetterberg, ice hockey player
- 2 November – Kennedy Bakircioglu, footballer
- 12 November – gustaf Skarsgård, actor
- 14 November – Johanna Thydell, writer
- 22 November – Emma Ejwertz, singer and songwriter
- 2 December – Charlotte Rohlin, former footballer
- 21 December – Stefan Liv, ice hockey player
- Unknown date – Jonas Cronert, politician

== Deaths ==
- 17 February – Einar Karlsson, wrestler (born 1908)
- 17 April – Alf Sjöberg, film director (born 1903)
- 20 June – Allan Pettersson, composer and violist (born 1911)
- 26 October – Per-Olof Östrand, swimmer (born 1930)
- 17 November – Hans Wetterström, sprint canoer.
