= Heed =

Heed or HEED may refer to:

== People ==
- Anneli Heed (born 1978), Swedish stand-up comedian impersonator and voice actress
- John Clifford Heed (1862–1908), American composer and musician
- Jonas Heed (born 1967), Swedish professional ice hockey player
- Kash Heed (born 1955), Canadian politician
- Peter Heed, American lawyer and former New Hampshire Attorney General
- Tim Heed (born 1991), Swedish professional ice hockey player

== Arts, entertainment, and media ==
- Heed Software, a workplace communication tool designed to streamline internal messaging, approvals, and digital signage for businesses.
- Heed (band), Swedish heavy metal band active 2004–2008 with Daniel Heiman and Fredrik Olsson
- Miss Heed, a character in Villainous (TV series)

== Military ==
- USS Heed (AM-100), an Auk-class minesweeper
- Helicopter emergency egress device (HEED), an item of survival equipment in the military for crew trapped in a ditched aircraft

== Places ==
- Heed Rock, a rock in the Wilhelm Archipelago, Antarctica
