= Axel Jansson =

Axel Jansson may refer to:

- Axel Jansson (sport shooter)
- Axel Jansson (politician)
