= Andreas Lennkvist Manriquez =

Swedish politician (born 1994)

Member of the Riksdag
- Incumbent
- Assumed office 8 January 2024
- Preceded by: Ali Esbati
- Constituency: Stockholm Municipality

Personal details
- Born: 3 June 1994 (age 32) Österåker, Sweden
- Party: Left Party
- Education: Stockholm University

Andreas Victor Lennkvist Manriquez (born 3 June 1994) is a Swedish politician and Member of the Riksdag. A member of the Left Party, he has represented Stockholm Municipality since January 2024.

Lennkvist Manriquez was born on 3 June 1994 in Österåker. He studied political science and sustainable development at Stockholm University. He has been a board member of the Left Party's branch in Österåker since 2013 and has served as its chair and vice-chair. He was elected to the municipal council in Österåker in 2018. He was a substitute member of the Riksdag for Nooshi Dadgostar between August 2019 and February 2020. He was appointed to the Riksdag in January 2024 following the resignation of Ali Esbati. He is the Left Party's spokesperson on civil affairs and LGBTQI issues.

Electoral history of Andreas Lennkvist Manriquez
Election	Constituency	Party	List no.	Votes	%	Result
2014 local	Österåker Municipality	Left Party	4			
2018 general	Stockholm Municipality	Left Party	9	94	0.12%	Not elected
2018 local	Österåker Municipality	Left Party	2	76	5.46%	Elected - personal mandate
2022 general	Stockholm Municipality	Left Party	8	89	0.13%	Not elected
2022 local	Österåker Municipality	Left Party	5	45	3.28%	Not elected
2026 general	Stockholm Municipality	Left Party	3	375	0.44%	Elected - party mandate
