= Marxist–Leninist Struggle League =

Marxist-Leninist Struggle League for the Communist Party of Sweden (M-L)
- Founded: 1970
- Dissolved: 1981
- Ideology: Marxism–Leninism-Mao Zedong Thought

Marxist-Leninistiska Kampförbundet (Swedish: [markˈsɪ̂sːtlɛnɪˌnɪstɪska ˈkâmpfœrˌbɵndɛt]; MLK; English: Marxist-Leninist Struggle League), full name Marxist-leninistiska kampförbundet för Sveriges kommunistiska parti (marxist-leninisterna) (English: "Marxist-Leninist Struggle League for the Communist Party of Sweden (marxists-leninists)"), was a communist political organization in Sweden formed in 1970 by Vänsterns Ungdomsförbund (Left Youth League), the youth organization of VPK. Within VUF several ultraleftist tendencies had surged during the 1960s, orientating it toward Maoism. VUF broke with VPK in 1968; in 1970, they formed MLK. MLK was ideologically almost identical with the larger KFML/SKP, with Marxism–Leninism-Mao Zedong Thought as the ideological backbone. MLK supported KFML/SKP in elections.

Notable former members include later Left Party leader Gudrun Schyman.

MLK suffered a major split in 1972 when a group under leadership of Anders Carlberg (had been the chairman of VUF) left MLK and formed Förbundet KOMMUNIST (League COMMUNIST).

MLK published Stormklockan, Kommunistisk Tidskrift för marxistisk-leninistisk teori och praktik and Suomalainen Stormklockan (in Finnish). The two latter ones were published between 1971 and 1978. Between 1980 and 1982, MLK and Kommunistisk Ungdom, the new VPK youth organisation, were involved in a legal dispute over the right to publish newspapers using the name Stormklockan, with MLK winning the dispute in the Court of Appeal for Western Sweden.

MLK maintained four bookstores, named after Set Persson, in Stockholm, Trollhättan, Sundsvall and Kiruna.

In 1981, MLK unified itself with Röd Ungdom, the youth organization of SKP.
