= 1984 in Swedish television =

This is a list of Swedish television related events from 1984.

== Events ==
- 5 May - Sweden wins the 29th Eurovision Song Contest in Luxembourg, Luxembourg. The winning song is "Diggi-Loo Diggi-Ley", performed by Herreys.
- 9 July – Miss Sweden 1984 Yvonne Riding is crowned as Miss Universe in Miami, USA, in the XXXIII edition.

== Television shows ==
- 1–24 December - Julstrul med Staffan & Bengt

== See also ==
- 1984 in Sweden
