= 1981 in Sweden =

- Decades: 1960s; 1970s; 1980s; 1990s; 2000s
- See also: Other events of 1981; Timeline of Swedish history

Events from the year 1981 in Sweden

== Incumbents ==
- Monarch – Carl XVI Gustaf
- Prime Minister – Thorbjörn Fälldin

== Events ==
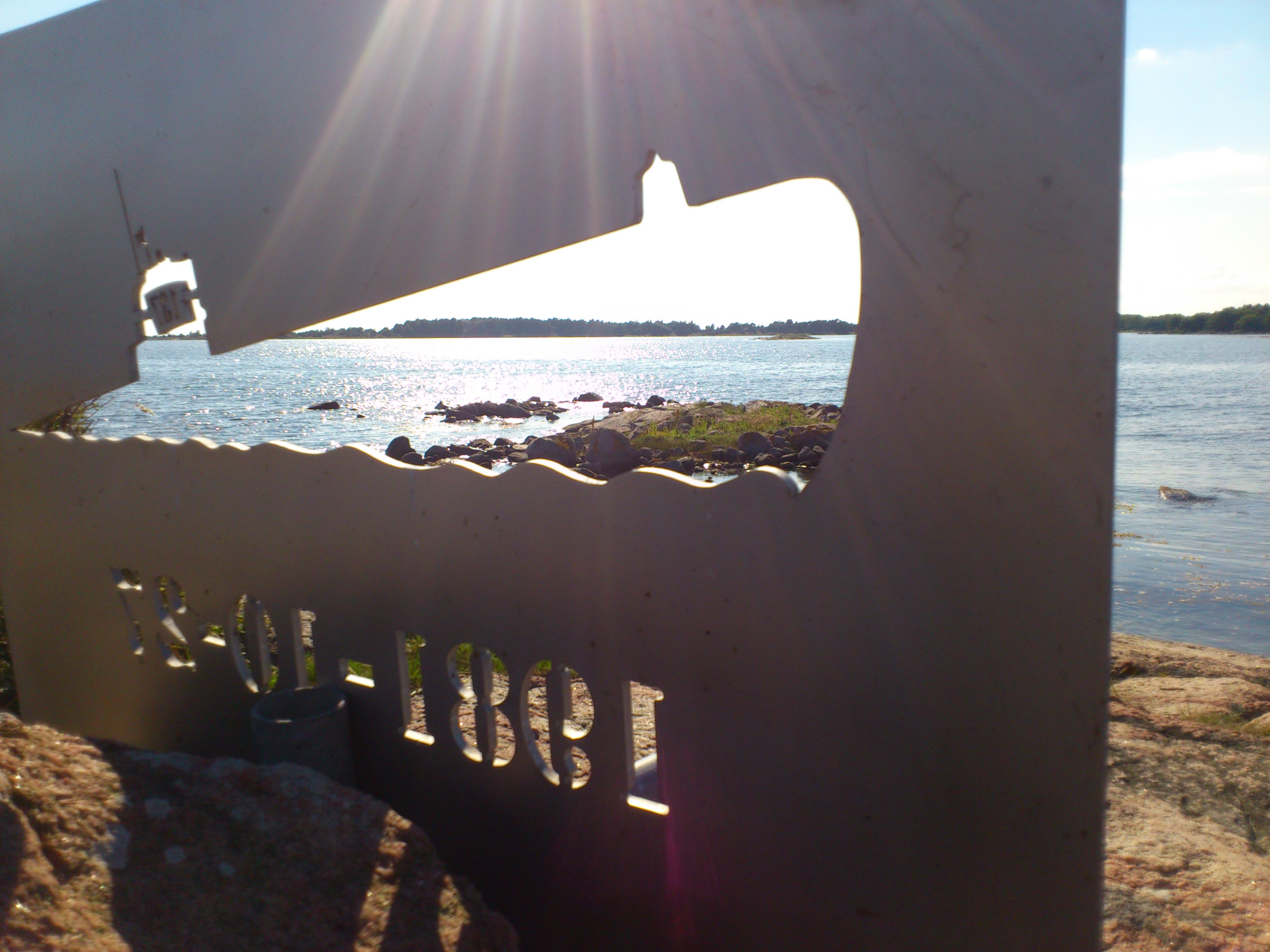
Memory sign at the location of the submarine grounding in October 1981.

- 27 October – The "Whiskey on the rocks" incident, when the Soviet submarine S-363 ran aground on the south coast of Sweden.
- 7 November – The Swedish Floorball Federation is founded in Sala.

== Births ==
- 3 January – Kajsa Bergström, curler
- 12 January – Niklas Kronwall, ice hockey player
- 16 February – Susanna Kallur, hurdler
- 18 March – Lina Andersson, cross country skier
- 25 April – Anja Pärson, skier
- 10 May – Kristian Svensson, handball player and handball coach
- 13 May – Rebecka Liljeberg, former actress
- 14 September – Sarah Dawn Finer, singer, songwriter and actress
- 3 October – Zlatan Ibrahimović, soccer player
- 20 October – Stefan Nystrand, swimmer

== Deaths ==
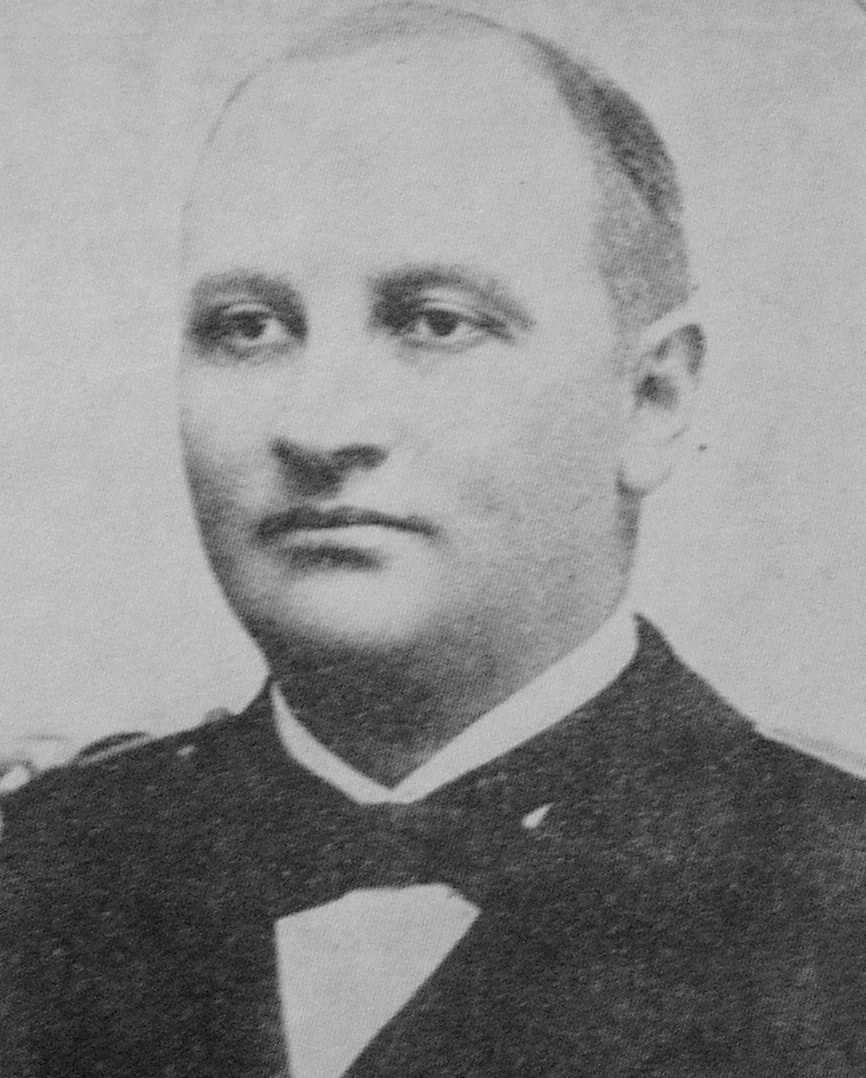
Gustaf Dyrssen

- 13 May – Gustaf Dyrssen, military officer (born 1891)
- 23 June – Zarah Leander, actress and singer (born 1907)
- 5 October – Helge Gustafsson, gymnast (born 1900)
