= Axel Jansson (politician) =

Swedish politician

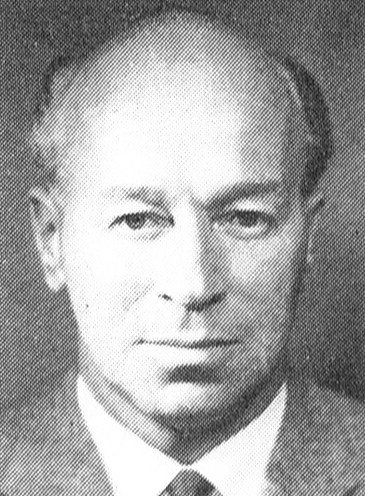
Axel Jansson 1916 SPA (cropped)

Karl Axel Jansson (14 December 1916 – 22 June 1968) was a Swedish politician, belonging to the Communist Party of Sweden.

Jansson, born in Västerås Lundby, was the son of Johan August Jansson and Maria Matilda Andersson. He was the chairman of the Linköping branch of Verdandi 1937–1939. Jansson served as secretary of the Young Communist League of Sweden 1943–1946, and the chairman of the organization 1947–1950. He was the editor of Stormklockan 1944–1950. Jansson was an advocate for replacing the communist youth movement with a broader, democratic youth organization.

He became a Central Committee member of the party in 1946. In 1951 he became a political affairs editor of Norrskensflamman. He later became the chairman of the board of Ny Dag.

Jansson was a member of the Stockholm City Council 1946–1950. Between 1951 and 1957 he was the chairman of the Örebro län District of the Communist Party. He also worked as a regional organizer for the Örebro län District of the Communist Party 1952–1957. He was a member of the landsting of Örebro län 1954–1958.

Between 1961 and 1967 he was the chairman of the Stockholm Communist Labour Commune, and between 1957 and 1967 he was part of the national Executive Committee of the party. He was elected to the Second Chamber of parliament in the 1964 election. He was a prominent figure in the right-wing trend inside the party leadership. He argued in favour of a gradual, parliamentary transition to socialism. Jansson lost his seat in the Executive Committee at the 1967 party congress.

Jansson died on Midsummers' Day at Vantör in 1968, at the age of 51. Carsten Thunborg replaced him in parliament.
