= Tove Fraurud =

Swedish politician (born 1980)

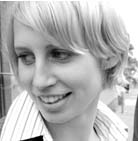

Tove Fraurud (born 19 August 1980) is a Swedish politician with the Left Party (Vänsterpartiet) and was the chairman of Young Left (Ung vänster), its youth wing, from 2004 to 2005.

She grew up in Akalla, a suburb north of Stockholm. She attended Tensta secondary school and joined the Young Left in 1997. She was elected new leader of the Young Left on 10 April 2004, as the successor of Ali Esbati, and was replaced by Ida Gabrielsson on 23 October 2005.
