= Carsten Thunborg =

Swedish politician (1918–2000)

Carsten Walfrid Thunborg (2 June 1918, Tyssedal, Odda Municipality, Norway - 22 December 2000) was a Swedish politician.

Thunborg was the son of Anders Walfrid Thunborg and Karen Bruvik. He worked as a sailor 1933–1936, then as construction worker between 1936 and 1951, and again from 1953 to 1957. Between 1951 and 1953 he worked as a journalist at Norrskensflamman in Luleå. He was an organizer of the Swedish Construction Workers Union. Between 1957 and 1968 he was a member of the board of Section 36 of the union.

Thunborg was a cadre of the Communist Party of Sweden. He served as chairman of Harsprånget Communist Labour Commune 1948 to 1951. He was a board member of the Stockholm Communist Labour Commune 1955–1958, and a member of the national party board 1958–1967 (included in the party Executive Committee 1964–1967). Thunborg became a member of parliament in 1968, following the death of Axel Jansson.

Thunborg later became a member of the Workers Party - Communists (APK), being a politburo member of the party.
