= Young Left (Sweden) =

Socialist and feminist youth organisation

Young Left Ung Vänster
- Chairperson: My Kårlycke
- Secretary General: Elna Igeland
- Founded: 1903; 123 years ago; 1970; 56 years ago
- Headquarters: Kungsgatan 84, Stockholm
- Membership: ▲2,086 (2024)
- Ideology: Communism; Revolutionary socialism; Feminism; Marxism
- Mother party: Left Party (formally independent)
- International affiliation: None; former member of the YCI, WFDY, and ENDYL
- Nordic affiliation: Socialistisk Ungdom i Norden (SUN)
- Website: ungvanster.se

Young Left (Swedish: Ung Vänster, pronounced [ˈɵŋː ˈvɛ̌nːstɛr]) is a socialist, Marxist, and feminist youth organisation. It is the official youth wing of the Swedish Left Party. The organisation calls themselves a "revolutionary youth organisation, with roots in the communist part of the labour movement, anchored in the women's movement, and influenced by the environmental and peace movement".

== Ideology ==
Young Left is a socialist, Marxist, and feminist political youth organisation committed to organising young people to work for social change that evolved out of the labour movement, with influences from environmentalism, the peace movement, and the feminist movement. Young Left works for social justice and a society characterised by equality, secularism, generous welfare provisions for all citizens, generous immigration policies, and respect for the environment. As its mother party, the Left Party, as well as the Social Democratic Party, Young Left is a strong supporter of the Swedish labour unions and the Swedish model, with conditions of work such as wages being regulated in branch-level collective agreements between the unions and the employers, rather than on individual basis. The Young Left has had various names and political alignments over the years, but is continuously characterised by the issues that have been at the centre of its history, such as antifascism, social justice, equality, and justice. During the past years, the main focus of the organisation has been the struggle against growing xenophobia in Sweden (as they mean been witnessed by the electoral success of the Sweden Democrats during the national elections of 2010) and criticism of the right government, and in particular on its privatisations of welfare services and priorities of tax reductions, rather than increased public spending on welfare and investments in infrastructure and renewable energy.

The Young Left, unlike the Left Party, are a revolutionary socialist organisation, which differentiates them from the more reformist Left Party in that they want to implement societal changes by revolution, and not reform.

== Organisation ==
Young Left works together with and supports the Left Party and Vänsterns Studentförbund, but makes, on the basis of its own analyses, independent decisions regarding organisational and political issues.

== History ==
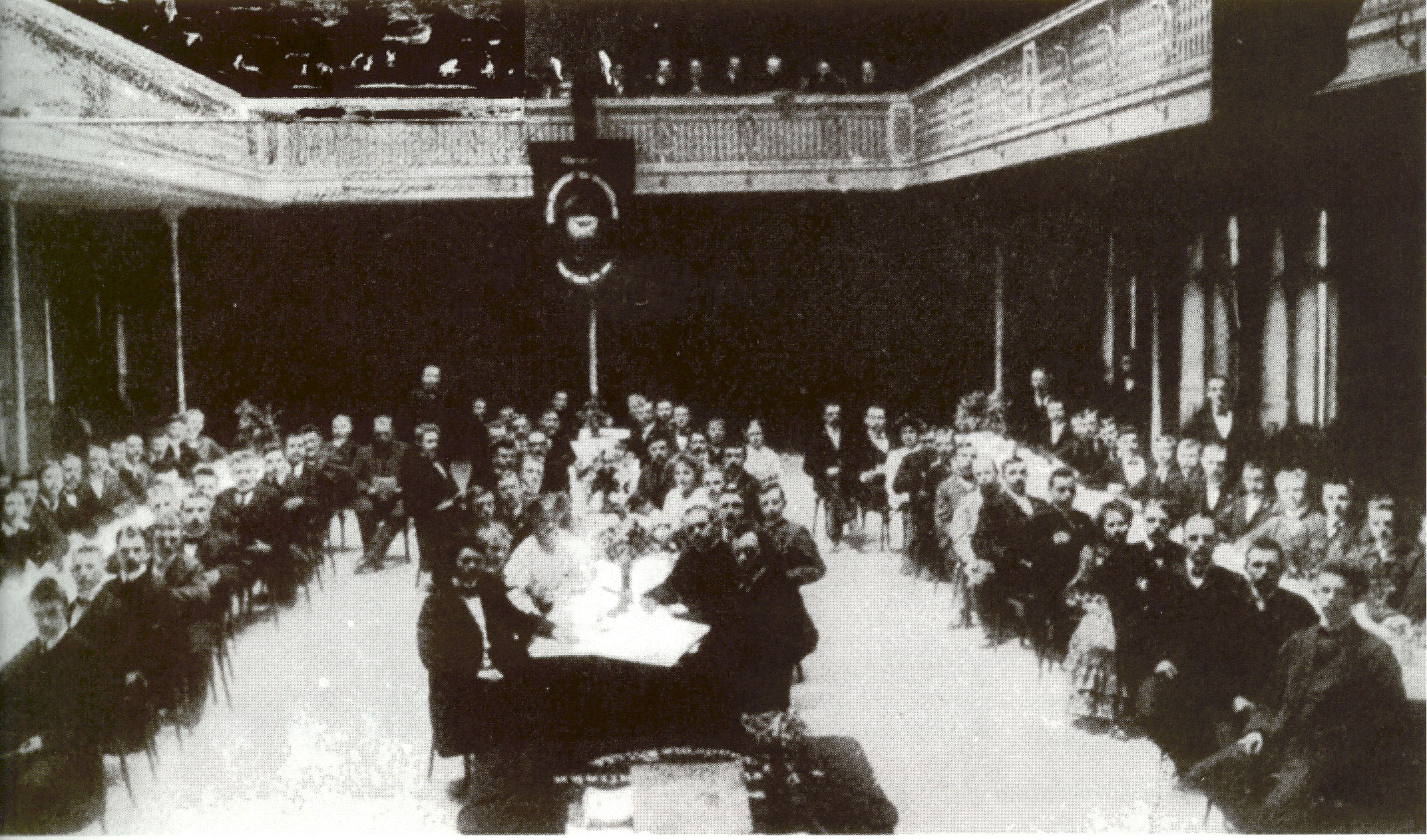
First congress of SDUF, in 1905

The Young Left was founded in 1903 as Socialdemokratiska Ungdomsförbundet (SDUF, Social Democratic Youth League). However, the youth league has clearly attached itself to the left-wing within the Social Democratic Party. At the outbreak of the First World War, the tensions within the party aggravated. In May 1917, the youth league together with the left-wing faction within the party took the initiative to form a new party, Sveriges socialdemokratiska vänsterparti (Social Democratic Left Party of Sweden). SDUF became the youth wing of the new party. SSV joined the Communist International in 1919, and was renamed to Sveriges kommunistiska parti (Communist Party of Sweden). Following that, SDUF was renamed to Sveriges Kommunistiska Ungdomförbund (Young Communist League of Sweden), and became the Swedish section of the Communist Youth International.

In 1952, Democratic Youth was founded on the initiative of the party, in order to be a broader youth movement. Until 1958, SKU and DU existed as parallel organisations. In 1958, the two organisations merged and took the name DU.

In 1967, ultra-left elements took over the organisation, and broke away to form Marxist-leninistiska kampförbundet (Marxist–Leninist Struggle League). Reconstruction work started rapidly. In 1970, the organisation was re-baptised as Kommunistisk Ungdom (Communist Youth). By 1973, there was a national organisation in function, and, by 1975, an ordinary congress was held.

Young Left have published the youth magazine Röd Press since 1982, when Young Left lost the rights of its magazine Stormklockan to the Maoist MLK in a trial.

In Sweden, Young Left was one of the many forces behind the large 15 February 2003 anti-war protest.

Under the later years of the 2010s, different members of the Young Left have been excluded because of strong couplings to the Revolutionary Front and the AFA. The national executive board have been doing both official exclusions and cut-offs in these cases. This is because these groups are not deemed compatible with the democratic socialism and anti-racism fight that the Young Left are driving. The party board of the Left Party has also been strongly advising for hard consequences in these situations.

After having had a stable membership of between 1,500 – 2,800 for a number of years, the membership of the youth organisation had declined to 964 in 2016 according to the Swedish Agency for Youth and Civil Society.

== Chairpersons ==
- 2025–present: My Kårlycke
- 2021–2025: Ava Rudberg
- 2017–2021: Henrik Malmrot
- 2015–2017: Hanna Cederin
- 2011–2015: Stefan Lindborg
- 2005–2011: Ida Gabrielsson
- 2004–2005: Tove Fraurud
- 2001–2004: Ali Esbati
- 1996–2001: Jenny Lindahl Persson
- 1993–1996: Jenny Jederlund
- 1989–1993: Magnus Blomgren
- 1980–1989: Stellan Hermansson
- 1975–1980: Lars Johansson
- 1973–1975: Bengt Karlsson
- 1970–1973: Bengt Karlsson, Urban Herlitz (spokespeople)
- 1967–1970: Anders Carlberg
- 1964–1967: Kjell E Johansson
- 1962–1964: Rolf Hagel
- 1957–1962: Rolf Utberg (DU)
- 1951–1958: Urban Karlsson (SKU)
- 19??–1951: Axel Jansson
- 1935–1939: Filip Forsberg
- 1921–1924: Nils Flyg
- 1909–1921: Zeth Höglund
- 1908–1909: Per Albin Hansson
- 190?–190?: Fabian Månsson

== Name changes ==
- 1903: Socialdemokratiska Ungdomsförbund (SDUF, Social Democratic Youth League)
- 1921: Sveriges Kommunistiska Ungdomsförbund (SKU, Young Communist League of Sweden)
- 1958: Demokratisk Ungdom (DU, Democratic Youth)
- 1967: Vänsterns Ungdomsförbund (VUF, Youth League of the Left)
- 1970: Kommunistisk Ungdom (KU, Communist Youth)
- 1991: Ung Vänster (Young Left)
