= Allan Wallenius =

Swedish-speaking Finnish journalist (1890–1942)

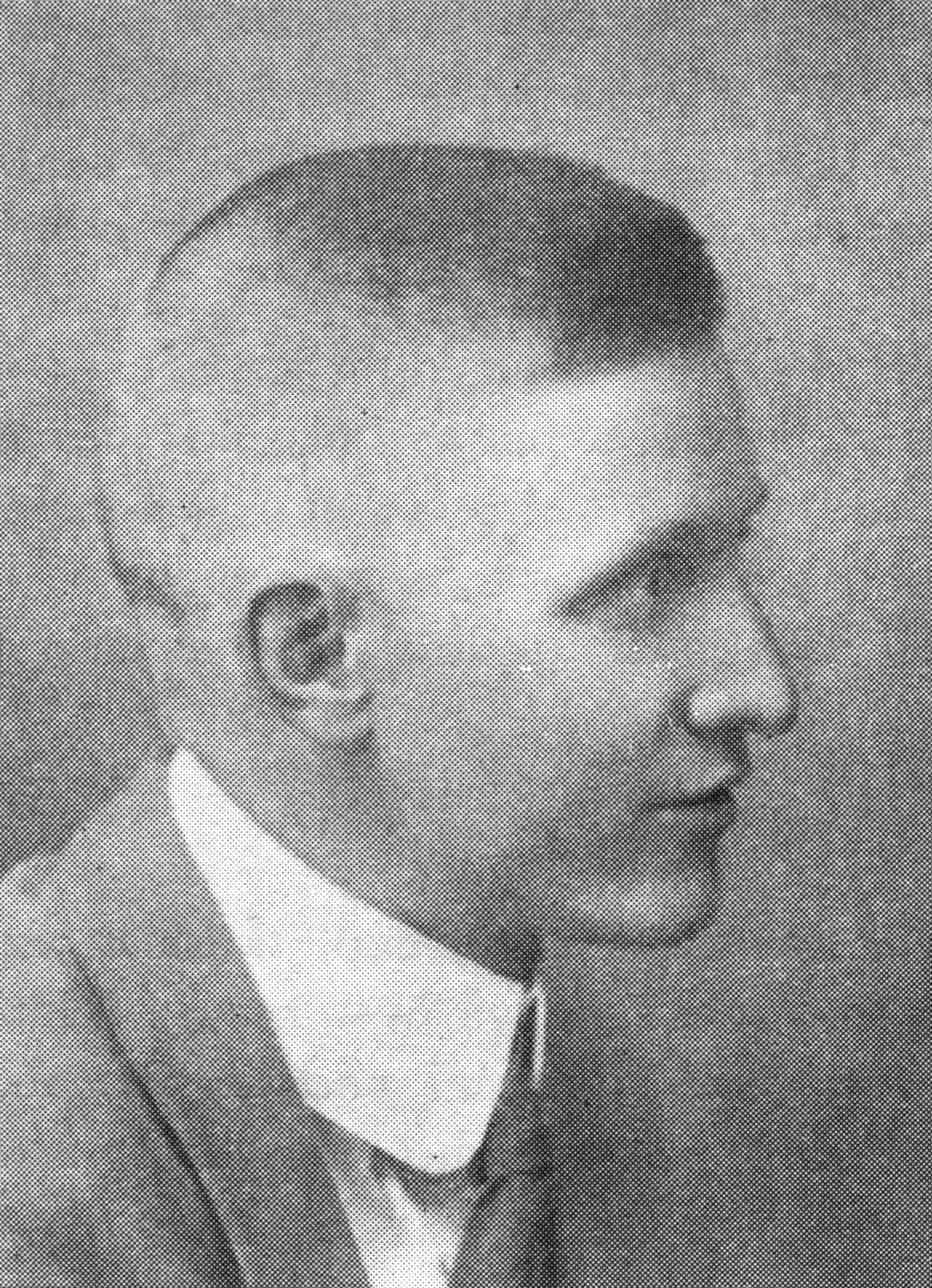
- Born: Allan Kurt Adolf Wallenius; 13 December 1890; Dragsfjärd, Grand Duchy of Finland
- Died: 15 September 1942 (aged 51); Kuybyshev, Soviet Union
- Occupation: Journalist
- Known for: Editor of Ny Tid
- Spouses: Alice Rosenblad (m. 1919; div. 1925); Edith Rudquist
- Children: 1

Allan Wallenius (13 December 1890 – 15 September 1942) was a Swedish-speaking Finnish leftist figure and journalist from Turku. He was active in leftist circles in Finland, Sweden and the United States before settling in the Soviet Union in 1930. Wallenius was the editor of Ny Tid, paper of the American Communist Party between 1925 and 1929. He served as the director of the Communist International Library in Moscow. He was arrested during the Great Purge in 1938 and died in a prison in 1942.

== Early life ==
Wallenius was born in Dragsfjärd on 13 December 1890 into a Finnish Swede middle class family. He was raised in Turku. He had a brother, Paul, who would participate in the civil war in Finland being part of the Whites and died in Tampere in March 1918.

== Career and activities ==
Allan went to the United States in 1915 to receive training on librarianship at New York Public Library. He was working as a librarian in Turku when he joined the Communist Party of Finland in 1918. Next he worked as a commissar of the postal services in Turku. He participated in the civil war in Finland.

Following the end of the war he fled to Switzerland and then to Petrograd. During his stay in Petrograd he contributed to a revolutionary magazine entitled Budkavlen. Due to the arrest warrant he could not return to his hometown, Turku, but he settled in Stockholm on 22 February 1919. He was given a residence permit and became a political refugee. He was not allowed to involve in political activities in Sweden, but he illegally took part in such activities. He published articles concerning his escape and illegal entry to Sweden in the leftist youth magazine Stormklockan based in Stockholm and in the newspaper Folkets Dagblad Politiken. In 1921 he joined the Communist Party of Sweden. He was arrested by the Swedish police on 9 June 1921 and was deported to Russia where he worked for the Comintern. He also acted as the secretary of the Finnish communist leader Otto Wille Kuusinen.

In the summer of 1925 Wallenius was sent by the Communist Party of Sweden to the United States to edit the Communist Party publication Ny Tid. He edited the paper under the name Ellis Peterson until 1929. In 1930, he settled in the Soviet Union. There he headed the Swedish section of the Communist University for National Minorities of the West in Leningrad. When the university was attached to the Lenin School he continued to serve in the post. He was later appointed director of the Communist International Library in Moscow. He was arrested by the NKVD (People's Commissariat for Internal Affairs) on 16 February 1938 and was sentenced to five years in prison. He died in the NKVD prison in Kuybyshev on 15 September 1942. He was pardoned posthumously after the death of Joseph Stalin in 1953.

== Personal life ==
Wallenius married his long-term fiancée Alice Rosenblad in March 1919, and in December of the same year their son, Aiwest, was born. She left Sweden in 1921 and joined Wallenius in Moscow. They sent Aiwest to Wallenius's parents in Finland. They divorced in 1925, and Alice Rosenblad became a Soviet citizen and a member of the Soviet Communist Party. She died in Moscow in 1966.

His second wife was Edith Rudquist, a daughter of Swedish parents migrated to the USA in 1902. She was a Chicago-based lawyer and Communist politician who served as the secretary of the Friends of the Soviet Union. They settled in the Soviet Union following the end of Wallenius's term as the editor of Ny Tid. Edith Rudquist contributed to the activities of the Scandinavian Workers League and died in the Soviet Union in 1943.

== Legacy ==
Annvi Gardberg and Matias Kaihovirta published Wallenius's biography in Swedish language in October 2022.
