= 1977 in Sweden =

- Decades: 1950s; 1960s; 1970s; 1980s; 1990s
- See also: Other events of 1977; Timeline of Swedish history

Events from the year 1977 in Sweden.

== Incumbents ==
- Monarch – Carl XVI Gustaf
- Prime Minister – Thorbjörn Fälldin

== Events ==
- 15 January – Linjeflyg Flight 618 plane crash: Linjeflyg Flight 618 crashes near Kälvesta after ice causes a loss of control, killing all 22 aboard.
- 3-8 May – The 1st IBF World Championships (badminton) are held in Malmö.
- 19 June – The 1977 Swedish Grand Prix (Formula One) is held at Anderstorp.
- 14 October – The 1977 Nobel Memorial Prize in Economic Sciences is awarded jointly to Bertil Ohlin (Sweden) and James E. Meade.
- 17 November – Miss Sweden Mary Ann Catrin Stavin is crowned Miss World in London, UK.
- 12 December – ABBA: The Album released.

== Births ==
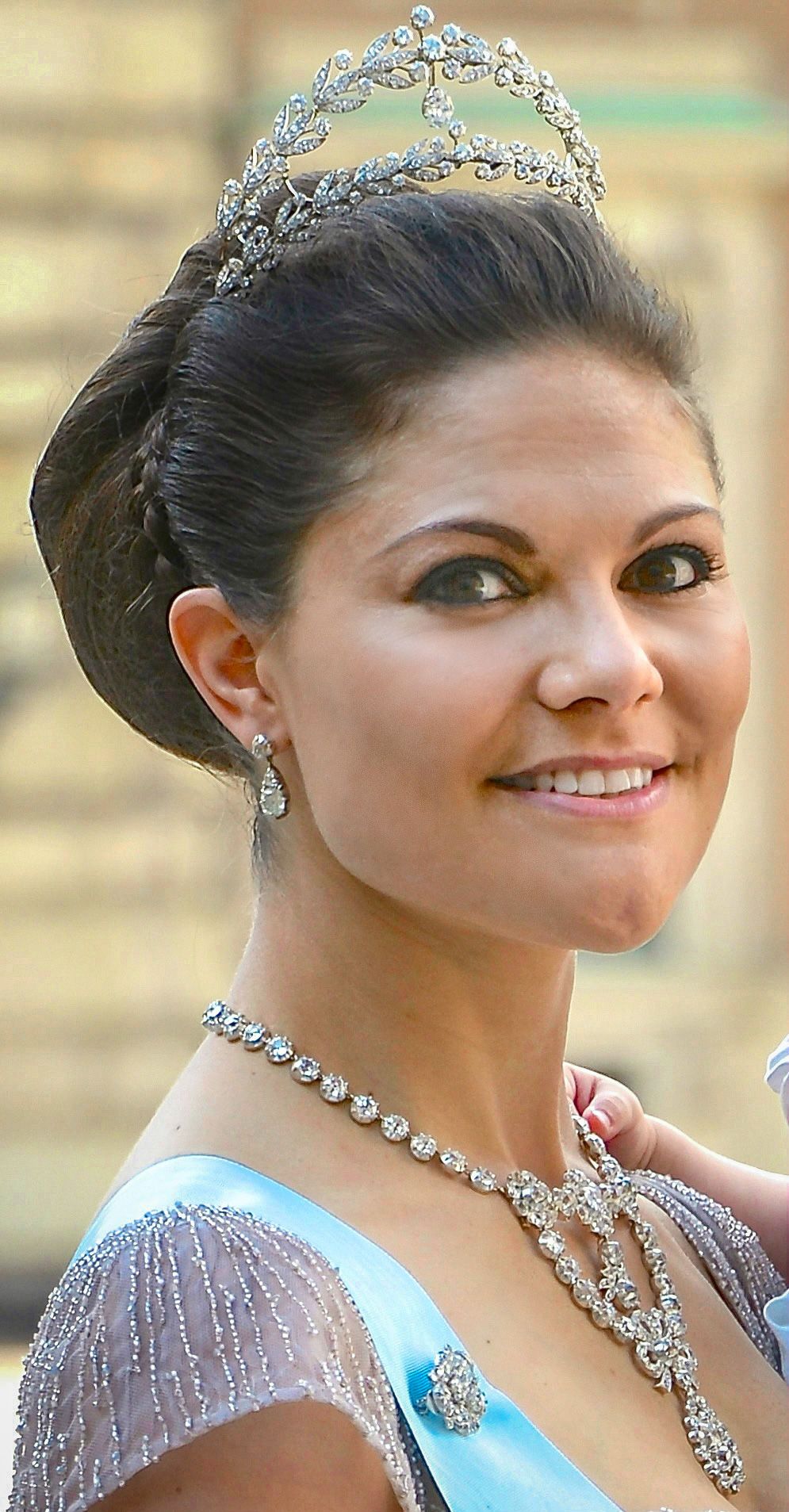
Victoria, Crown Princess of Sweden.

- 26 January – Nicholaus Arson, guitarist and songwriter
- 27 February – Andrine Winther, politician
- 19 March – Robert Lindstedt, tennis player
- 23 March – Daniel Espinosa, filmmaker
- 5 April – Daniel Majstorović, footballer
- 16 April – Freddie Ljungberg, Swedish footballer
- 17 May – Anders Södergren, cross-country skier
- 14 July – Victoria, Crown Princess of Sweden
- 28 July – Malin Danielsson, politician
- 26 August – Therese Alshammar, swimmer
- 28 August – Daniel Andersson, footballer
- 3 September – Olof Mellberg, footballer
- 14 September – Malik Bendjelloul, film and documentary director
- 4 October – Ana Johnsson, singer
- 14 October – Carl Johan Grimmark, guitarist
- 20 November – Daniel Svensson, drummer
- 22 November – Jonas Öberg, open source software activist
- 17 December – Samuel Påhlsson, Swedish ice hockey player
- 18 December – Axwell, DJ, remixer and record producer
- 20 December – Sonja Aldén, singer

=== Full date missing ===
- Erika Lust, film director

== Deaths ==
- 5 March – Albert Andersson, athlete and gymnast (born 1902)
- 10 October – Bengt Bengtsson, gymnast (born 1897)
