= 1983 in Sweden =

- Decades: 1960s; 1970s; 1980s; 1990s; 2000s
- See also: Other events of 1983; Timeline of Swedish history

Events from the year 1983 in Sweden

== Incumbents ==
- Monarch – Carl XVI Gustaf
- Prime Minister – Olof Palme

== Events ==
- 1 January – the Name Act of 1982, replacing the Name Act of 1963, comes into full and legal effect .
- The Tiveden National Park was established

== Popular culture ==
=== Film ===
- 16 September – Beyond Sorrow, Beyond Pain released

== Births ==
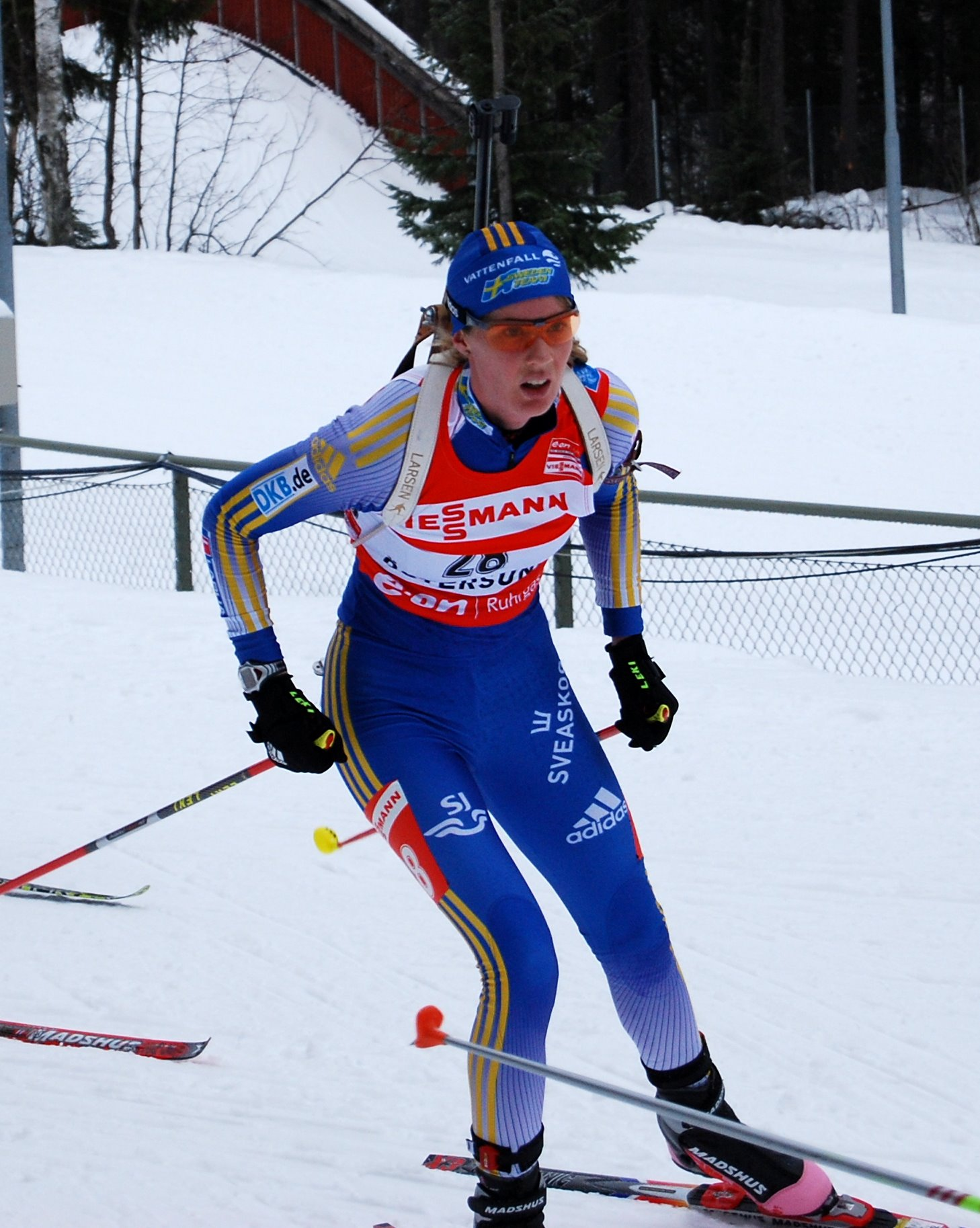
Anna Maria Nilsson

- 27 January – John Lundvik, singer
- 21 February – Emilie O'Konor, ice hockey player
- 28 February – Sara Nordenstam, Swedish-born Norwegian swimmer.
- 9 May – Petter Stymne, swimmer
- 13 May – Anna Maria Nilsson, biathlete
- 7 July – Nanna Jansson, ice hockey player
- 11 July – Marie Serneholt, Swedish singer.
- 6 September – Johanna Wiberg, handball player.
- 9 September – Frej Larsson, musician
- 17 October – Åsa Persson, figure skater
- 16 October – Loreen, singer
- 19 October – Rebecca Ferguson, Swedish actress
- 15 December – Jonas Persson, swimmer.

== Deaths ==
- 22 February – Georg Rydeberg, film actor (born 1907)
- 12 May – Olle Ohlson, water polo player (born 1921).
- 16 June – Aina Wifalk, social scientist and inventor of the modern walker (born 1928).
