= 1982 in Sweden =

- Decades: 1960s; 1970s; 1980s; 1990s; 2000s
- See also: Other events of 1982; Timeline of Swedish history

Events from the year 1982 in Sweden

== Incumbents ==
- Monarch – Carl XVI Gustaf
- Prime Minister – Thorbjörn Fälldin, Olof Palme

== Events ==
- 17 September – The Hotline Riot, when about 1,000 teenagers arranged to meet through heta linjen.
- 19 September – The 1982 Swedish general election is held.
- 8 October – Thorbjörn Fälldin resigns as Prime Minister of Sweden, following a defeat for the Centre Party of Sweden in the Swedish parliamentary election. He is replaced with Olof Palme.

== Births ==
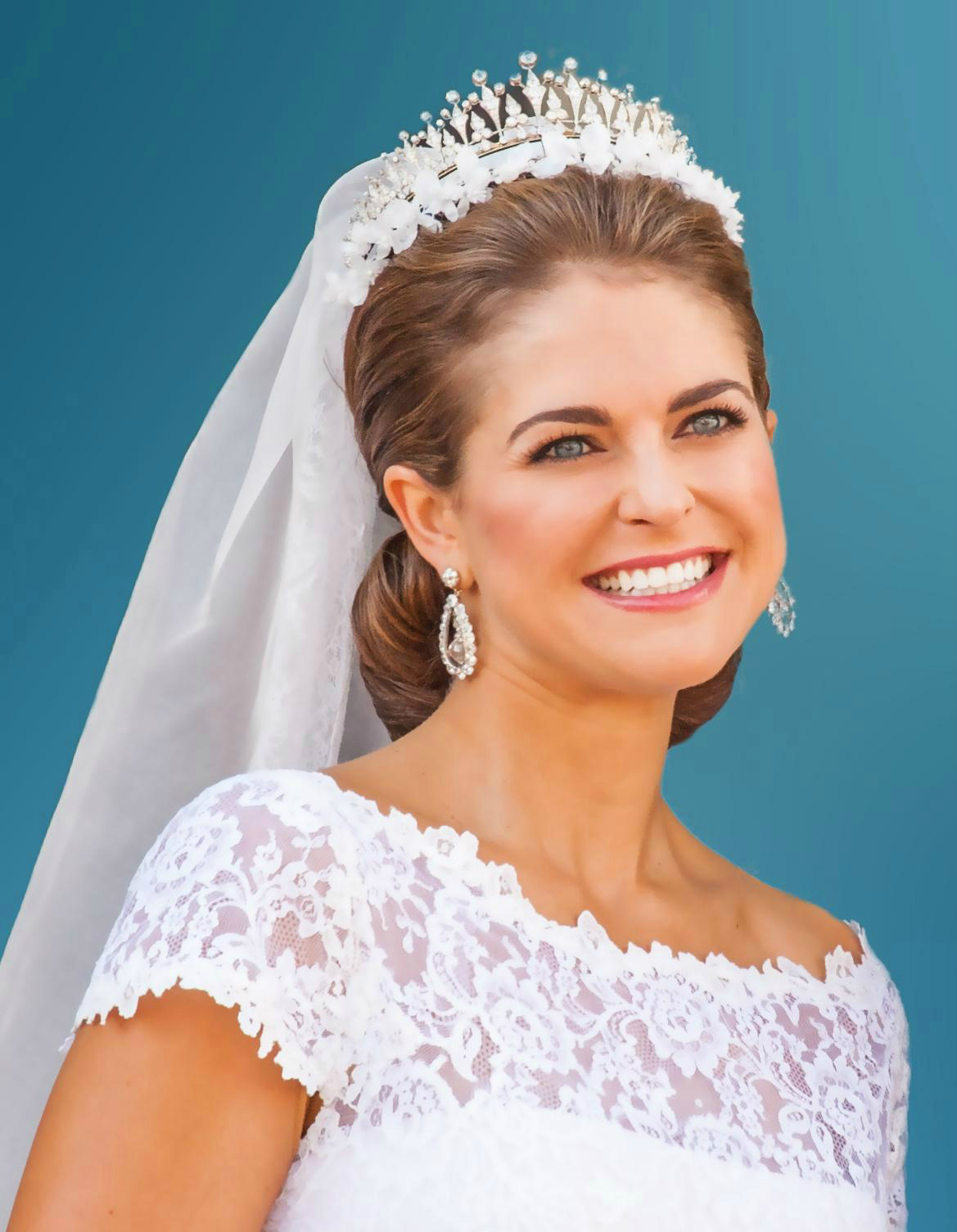
Princess Madeleine

- 3 January – Lasse Nilsson, footballer
- 25 January – Patrik Ingelsten, football coach and former player
- 31 January – Yukimi Nagano, singer-songwriter
- 6 February – Bojan Djordjic, footballer
- 2 March – Henrik Lundqvist, ice hockey player
- 2 March – Joel Lundqvist, ice hockey player
- 8 March – Erik Ersberg, ice hockey player
- 9 March – Tobias Hysén, footballer
- 10 March – Andreas Johansson, footballer
- 15 March – Daniel Rickardsson, cross-country skier
- 21 April – Patrik Sandell, rally driver
- 15 May Stefan Ishizaki, footballer
- 10 June – Princess Madeleine, Duchess of Hälsingland and Gästrikland
- 23 June – Martin Rolinski, Musical artist
- 1 July – Joachim Johansson, tennis player
- 21 July – Miss Li (Linda Karlsson), singer-songwriter
- 23 July – Ace Wilder, singer
- 6 August – Elin Nilsson, politician
- 8 August – Viktor Fasth, ice hockey player
- 10 August – John Alvbåge, footballer
- 17 August – Jon Olsson, freestyle skier
- 21 August – Kim Andersson, handball player
- 24 August – Kim Källström, footballer
- 10 September – Staffan Kronwall, ice hockey player
- 15 September – Sofia Jannok, Musical artist
- 15 September – Per Nilsson, footballer
- 27 September – Markus Rosenberg, footballer
- 2 November – Johan Wissman, sprinter
- Unknown date – Ylva Stadell, politician

== Deaths ==
- 4 January – Konrad Granström, gymnast (born 1900)
- 30 January – Tora Dahl, writer (born 1886)
- 10 March – Erik August Larsson, cross country skier (born 1912)
- 8 June – Solveig Rönn-Christiansson, politician (born 1902)
- 8 July – Gunnar Eriksson, cross country skier (born 1921)
- 15 August – Hugo Theorell, biochemist
- 20 August – Ulla Jacobsson, actress born 1929)
- 29 August – Ingrid Bergman, actress (born 1915)
