= 1985 in Swedish television =

This is a list of Swedish television related events from 1985.

== Events ==
- 4 May - The 30th Eurovision Song Contest is held at the Scandinavium in Gothenburg. Norway wins the contest with the song "La det swinge", performed by Bobbysocks!.

== See also ==
- 1985 in Sweden
