= Fisktorget =

Former public square in Malmö, Sweden

Coordinates: 55.607294°N 12.996986°E

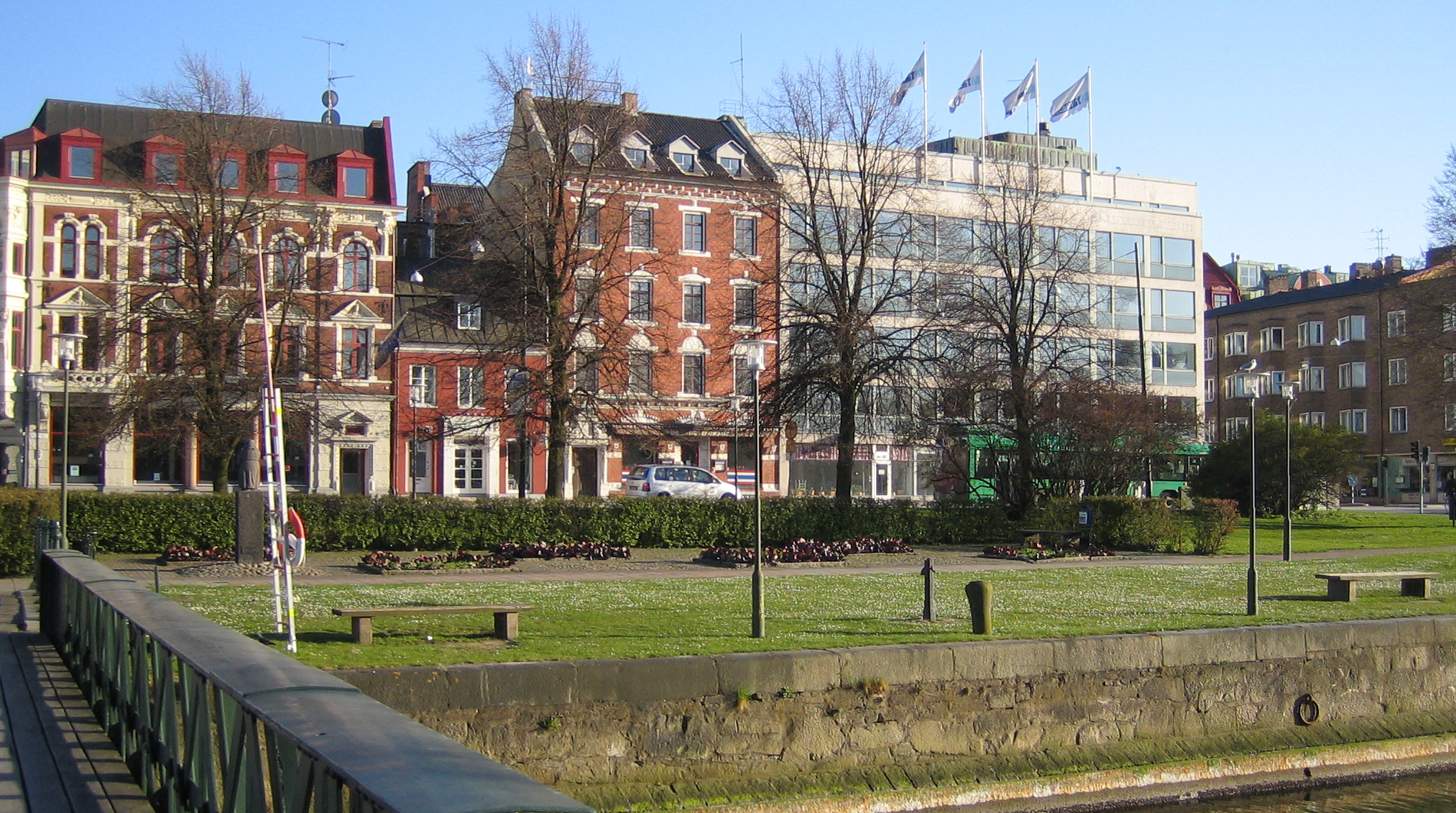
Fisktorget

Fisktorget or Fisktorg (English: Fish market) is a former public square in Malmö, Sweden.

The square was built in 1894 at Bastion Älvsborg immediately west of Hjälmarbron. Fish was sold and transported by railway. In 1969, the square was removed and the name expired, but the statue "Fiskegumma" ("Fish granny") from 1949 by the sculptor Clarence Blum is reminiscent of the fishing trading spot.
