= 1975 in Swedish television =

This is a list of Swedish television related events from 1975.

== Events ==
- 22 March - The 20th Eurovision Song Contest is held at the Stockholm International Fairs. The Netherlands wins the contest with the song "Ding-a-dong", performed by Teach-In.

== Television shows ==
- 1–24 December - Långtradarchaufförens berättelser

=== 1960s ===
- Hylands hörna (1962–1983)

=== 1970s ===
- Hem till byn (1971–2006)

== Births ==
- 20 September - Tobbe Blom, TV host & magician
- 16 November - Jessica Almenäs, TV host & reporter

== See also ==
- 1975 in Sweden
