= Nila Vikhe Patil =

Swedish politician (born 1985)

Member of the Riksdag
- Incumbent
- Assumed office 28 September 2026
- Constituency: Stockholm Municipality

Personal details
- Born: 1985 (age 40–41) Lidköping, Sweden
- Party: Green Party
- Education: Gothenburg School of Business, Economics and Law; Complutense University of Madrid

Nila Margite Elisa Vikhe Patil (Marathi: नीला विखे पाटील; born 1985) is a Swedish politician and Member of the Riksdag. A member of the Green Party, she has represented Stockholm Municipality since September 2026.

== Early life and family ==
Vikhe Patil was born in 1985 in Lidköping. She is the daughter Ashok Vikhe Patil, an educationist from the state of Maharashtra in India, and Eva-Lill Nilsson, a Swedish painter and teacher. She is the great granddaughter of Indian industrialist Vithalrao Vikhe Patil, granddaughter Indian union minister Balasaheb Vikhe Patil and niece of Maharashtra state minister Radhakrishna Vikhe Patil. She spent her early years in Ahmednagar, India where she attended an English medium preschool. When she was seven years old her father sent her back to Sweden for her education.

Vikhe Patil spent most of her childhood in the village of Kungslena in Tidaholm Municipality with her mother. She has a bachelor’s degree and an MBA from the Gothenburg School of Business, Economics and Law. She also has an MBA from Complutense University of Madrid.

== Career ==
Vikhe Patil has worked for PwC since 2020 and has been a certified public accountant since 2025.

Vikhe Patil has held various roles in the Young Greens, Gröna studenter and the Gothenburg and Stockholm branches of the Green Party. She was a member of Stockholm City Council. She served as an adviser in the Prime Minister’s Office during Stefan Lofven's premiership. She was elected to the Riksdag at the 2026 general election.

== Electoral history ==
Electoral history of Nila Vikhe Patil
| Election | Constituency | Party | List no. | Votes | % | Result |
|---|---|---|---|---|---|---|
| 2018 general | Stockholm Municipality | Green Party | 9 | 91 | 0.19% | Not elected |
| 2018 local | Stockholm Municipality - Södermalm–Enskede | Green Party | 11 | | | Elected - party mandate |
| 2026 general | Stockholm Municipality | Green Party | 5 | 85 | 0.12% | Elected - party mandate |
