= Nyköpingsbro =

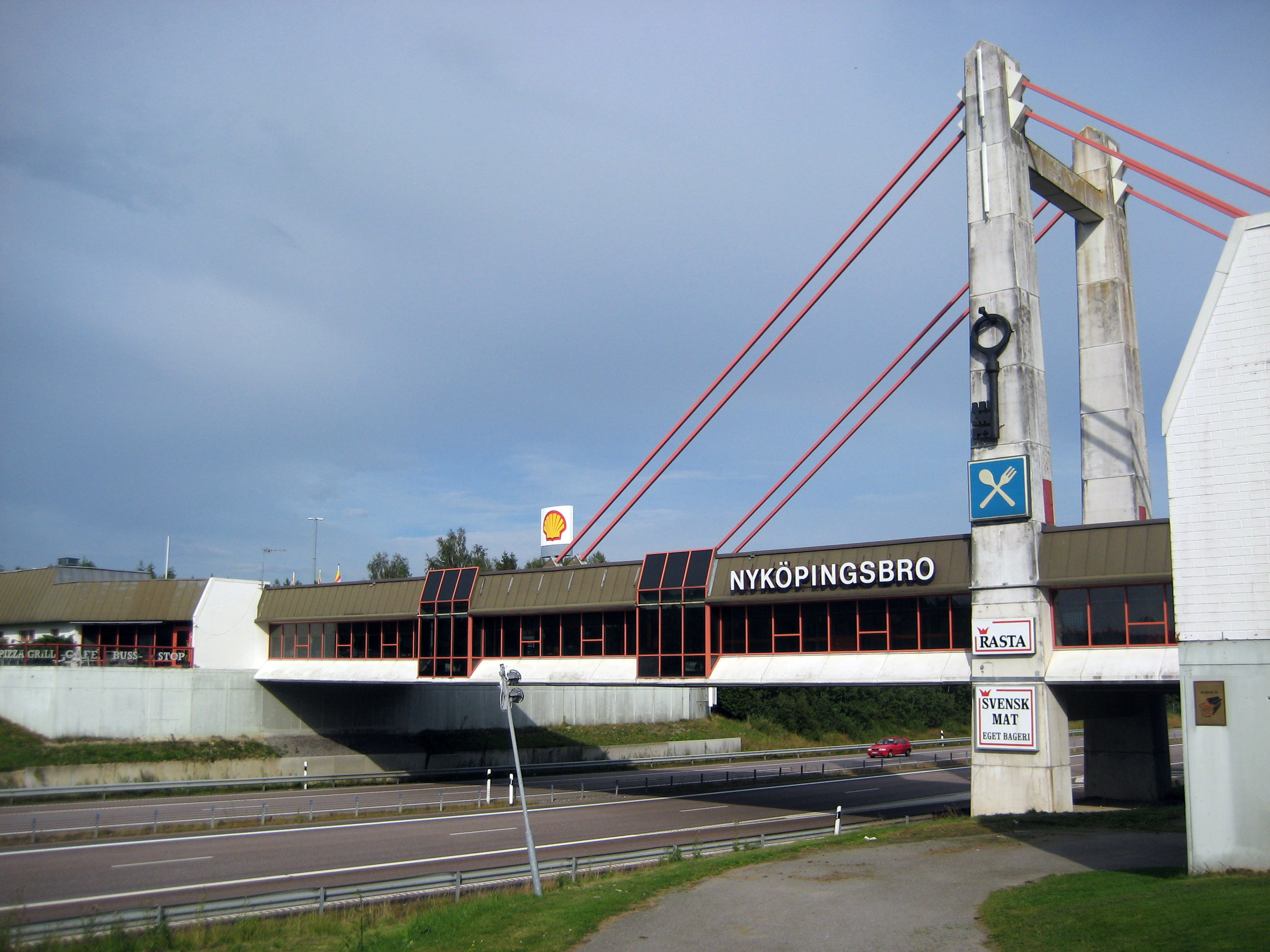
Nyköpingsbro

Nyköpingsbro is a rest area with restaurant, located near the E4 motorway southwest of the town Nyköping in Sweden. Inaugurated in October 1986, the facility is built as a covered bridge restaurant. The bridge's pylon is decorated with a sculpture of a key, in reference to the Nyköping Banquet.
