= Carl Klingborg =

Swedish bandy player

Carl Klingborg (born April 8, 1986) is a Swedish bandy player who plays as a forward. Carl began his career at Vetlanda BK.

His list of clubs is as follows-

Vetlanda BK (2003–2004)
Hammarby IF Bandy (2004–2006)
Sköndals IK (2004–2005)
GT-76 (2005–2006)
IK Sirius (2006–2008)
