= Clarence Blum =

British-Swedish sculptor

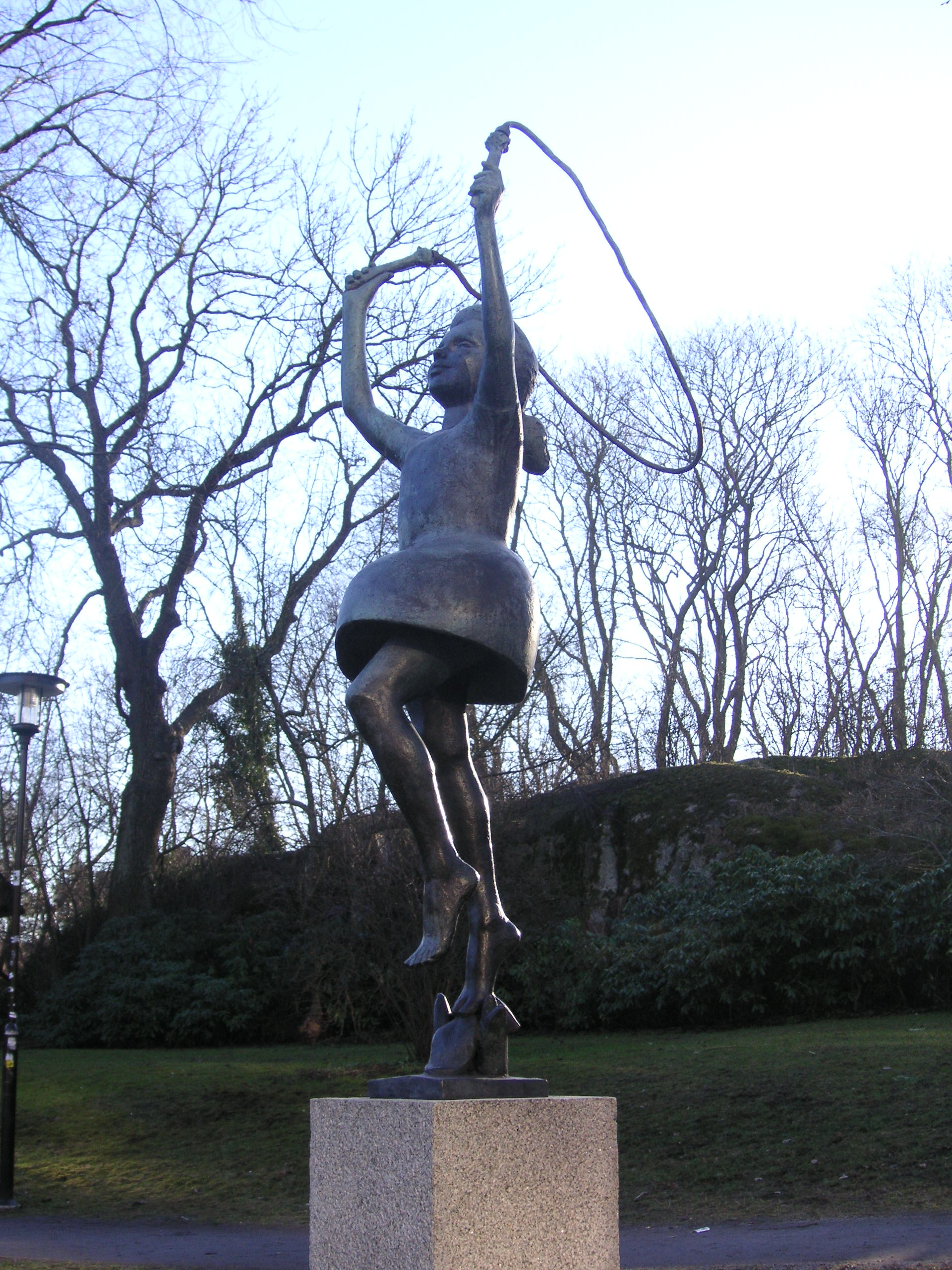
Girl with skipping rope, bronze, Högalidsparken, Stockholm, Sweden

Clarence Berndt Adolf Blum (10 July 1897 in Liverpool, England – 23 September 1984 in Täby, Sweden) was a British-Swedish sculptor.

Clarence Blum studied at the Academy of Fine Arts in Stockholm. His art works include a fountain outside the Eastman Institute in Stockholm (1936), the sculptures Fiskegumma at Fisktorget (1949), Malmö and Girl with a skipping rope (1967) at Högalidsparken in Stockholm.
