= Öxnehaga Church =

Coordinates: 57.7740°N 14.2634°E

- Öxnehagakyrkan
- Öxnehaga Church
- Location: Öxnehaga
- Country: Sweden
- Denomination: Church of Sweden

History
- Consecrated: 27 November 1976

Administration
- Diocese: Växjö
- Parish: Huskvarna

Öxnehaga Church (Swedish: Öxnehagas kyrka) is a church building at Öxnehaga in Huskvarna in Sweden. Belonging to the Huskvarna Parish of the Church of Sweden, it was inaugurated on 27 November 1976, which was the Saturday before the First Advent Sunday that year.
