= Kristina Ohlsson =

Swedish author

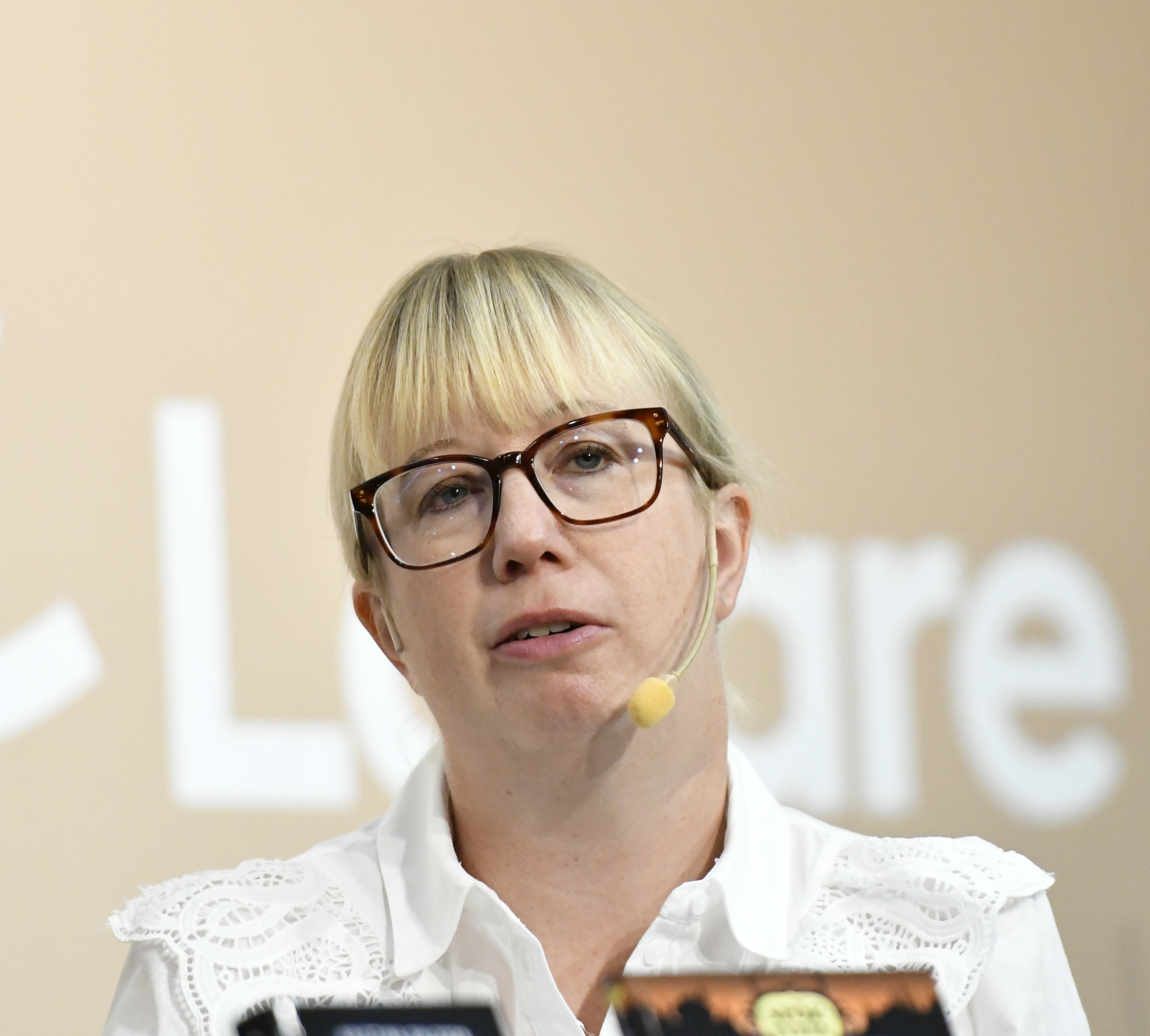
- Born: 2 March 1979 (age 47); Kristianstad, Sweden
- Writing career
- Genre: Crime Fiction

Kristina Maria Ohlsson (born 2 March 1979) is a Swedish political scientist and award-winning writer.

She grew up in Kristianstad and then moved to Gothenburg, where she studied Political Science. Then, she obtained a master’s degree in political science and crisis management from the Swedish Defence University in Stockholm. Ohlsson has worked as a Counter-Terrorism Officer at the Organization for Security and Co-operation in Europe; she has also worked for the Swedish Security Service, for the Swedish Ministry for Foreign Affairs and for the Swedish National Defense College. She lives in Stockholm.

Besides her adult fiction, which includes a series featuring investigative analyst Fredrika Bergman, Ohlsson has also written a popular trilogy of children's suspense novels. In 2010, she was awarded the Stabilo Prize for Best Crime Writer of Southern Sweden. In 2013, she received the Children's Novel Award from Sveriges Radio. In 2017, she was awarded the Crimetime Specsavers Award for children's crime fiction.

Ohlsson's first novel Unwanted was adapted for Swedish TV as Sthlm Rekviem (Stockholm Requiem on Walter Presents in the UK).

== Selected works ==
Fredrika Bergman series

- Askungar, crime novel (2009), translated as Unwanted (2012)
- Tusenskönor, crime novel (2010), translated as Silenced (2012), shortlist for Swedish Crime Writers' Academy Best Crime Novel of the Year
- Änglavakter, crime novel (2011), translated as The Disappeared (2013), shortlist for Swedish Crime Writers' Academy Best Crime Novel
- Paradisoffer, crime novel (2012), translated as Hostage
- Davidsstjärnor, crime novel (2013), translated as The Chosen
- Syndafloder, crime novel (2017), translated as The Flood

Martin Brenner series

- Lotus BLues, crime novel (2014)
- Mios BLues, crime novel (2015)
