= Stina Oscarson =

Swedish writer (1975–2025)

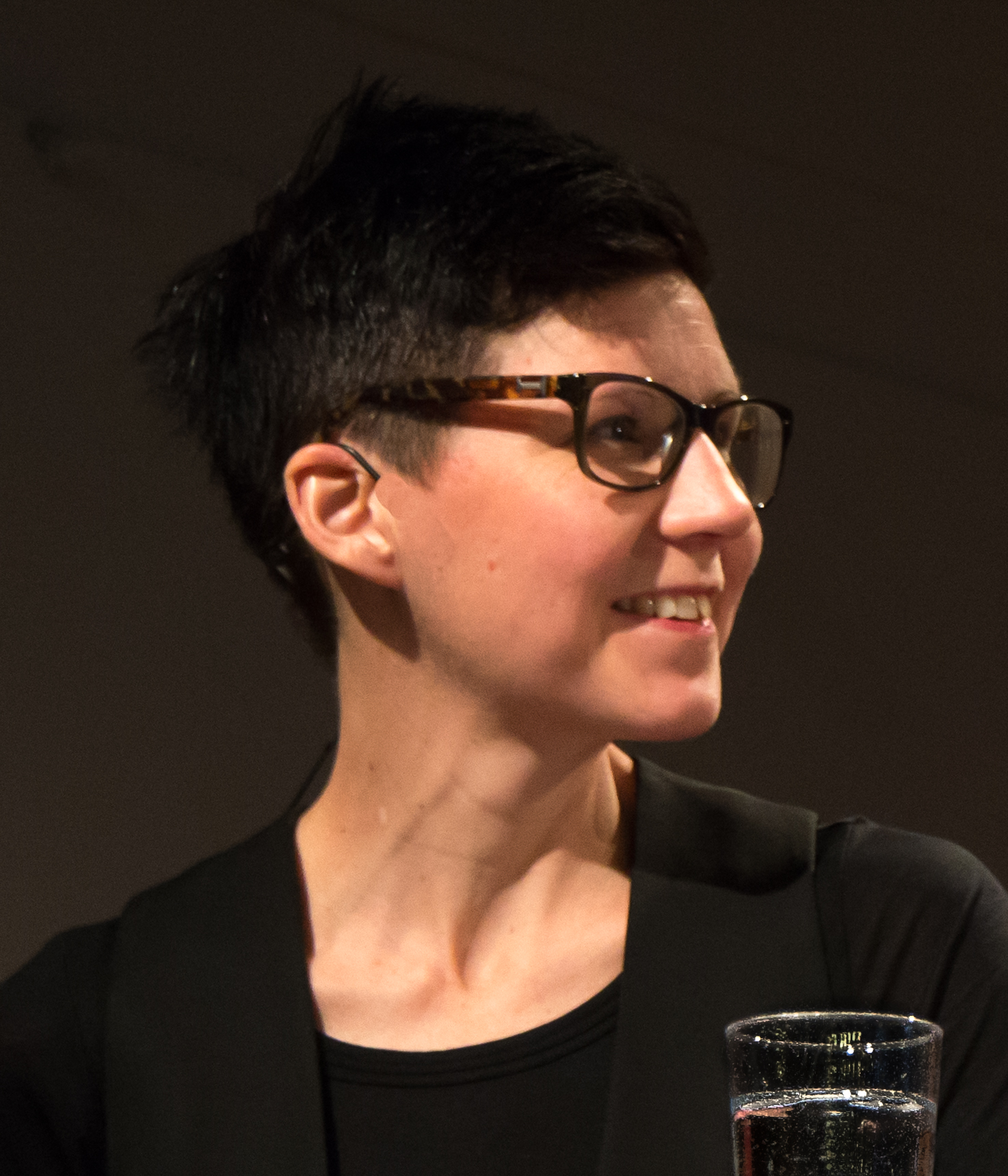
- Oscarson in 2015
- Born: Stina Elisabet Oscarson; 17 October 1975; Skellefteå, Sweden
- Died: 18 April 2025 (aged 49); Stockholm, Sweden
- Occupations: Theater director; author

Stina Elisabet Oscarson (17 October 1975 – 18 April 2025) was a Swedish theater director, author and debater.

== Life and career ==
Stina Elisabet Oscarson was born on 17 October 1975 in the town of Skellefteå.

She grew up in Skellefteå and worked with theater at Stockholm's stadsteater, along with Suzanne Osten and Etienne Glaser. She also worked at Byteatern in Kalmar, Västerbottensteatern, and Den Konglige Teater in Copenhagen.

In 1997, she founded the theater group Teater ML02 which has received attention with productions like Insekternas liv (The life of bugs) and Elvira Madigan.

Between July 2004 and April 2011, she along with Lars Rudolfsson were theater leaders for the Orionteatern in Stockholm. During her time there, she held seminars about civil obedience as well as seminars about her work and the overall work in the theater. She also established an ”open stage” evening where singers and actors performed one Friday each month for a low admittance fee.

From May 2011 to May 2014, she was the CEO of Radioteatern at Sveriges Radio. She left the job in May 2014 after being critical of her working environment and experienced a lack of support from Sveriges Radio with her ambition to work to improve and innovate the radio theater section.

Oscarson was a known social debater, amongst others in the culture debate with visions to do theater as a forum for political and democratic talks. In 2010, she released the book Att vara eller vara en vara – visioner om en annan kulturpolitik (To be or to be a product – Visions of a different politics of culture). Ahead of the 2014 Swedish general election, she wrote the book Handbok för en ny kulturminister (Handbook for a new Minister of Culture) at the request of the social service Katalys.

In 2014, Oscarson worked as a leader of the ABF artist work called Socialistiskt forum, with the goal to re-instate culture more in the workers everyday life. Since 2014, she wrote a chronicle for Dagens Nyheters culture pages. She also had a podcast along with Lars Anders Johansson called "mellan Scylla och Charybdis".

In 2018, Oscarson released Tror du att du kan förändra världen utan att anstränga dig? (Do you think you can change the world without effort?), a book that wants to discover ways to change the world without violence.

In 2019, Oscarson became an honorary doctor at the Gävle University College.

Oscarson died after suffering from anorexia nervosa on 18 April 2025, at the age of 49.
