= Ali Esbati =

Iranian-Swedish politician and economist (born 1976)

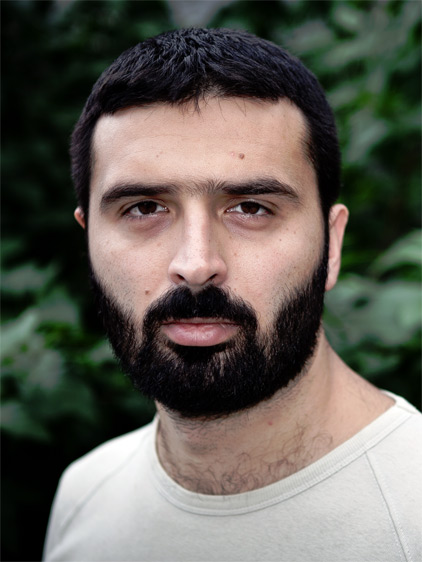
- Esbati in 2011

Member of the Riksdag
- In office 20 September 2014 – 8 January 2024
- Constituency: Stockholm Municipality

Personal details
- Born: 12 June 1977 (age 49) Tehran, Iran
- Party: Left

Ali Esbati (Persian: علی اثباتی; born 12 June 1977) is an Iranian-Swedish politician of the Left Party who was a member of the Riksdag from 2014 to 2024. An economist, he was the chairman of Young Left from 2001 to 2004. He was also the economic spokesperson for the Left Party from 2022 to 2024. He became famous for his blogging; his blog Esbatis kommentarer was at one time one of the most popular Swedish political blogs.

Esbati previously lived in Norway, where he held several jobs within the left-wing political sphere. After resigning from his position as the debate and opinion editor of the newspaper Klassekampen, he worked as managing director at the think tank Manifest. He is also a regular contributor to several Swedish and Norwegian magazines. Esbati has also been published in a number of books.

== Early life and education ==
Esbati was born on 12 June 1977 in Teheran, Iran. He came to Sweden in 1986 with his mother and a younger brother (his father joined them a year later). The family initially lived in a refugee shelter in Bromma, before eventually moving to Tensta. He joined Young Left in 1990. After primary school, he attended high school in Tensta and another one, specialized in mathematics, in Danderyd.

He received a degree in economics from the Stockholm School of Economics. In 1999–2000 he completed his military service at Televapenkompaniet in Uppland, where he was also trained in Russian. He is an atheist.

He was chairman of the Young Left from 2001–2004.

=== Utøya shooting ===
Esbati was invited to host a lecture at the summer camp of the Norwegian Workers' Youth League on Utøya outside Oslo on 22 July 2011. There he became a witness of the shooting of 69 people by the lone gunman Anders Behring Breivik, most of them young members of the League. Esbati told afterwards that he saw how several people were killed, but managed to survive the tragedy by hiding in the surrounding woods and water.

=== Personal ===
Esbati previously lived with journalist and former Red Youth leader Marte Michelet. The couple has a daughter together.

== Political career ==
Esbati has previously served in several internal offices within Young Left and the Left Party.

In 2010 he ran as a candidate for the Riksdag on the list for Stockholm Municipality and was elected as the first deputy. In 2013 he served as a replacement for Josefin Brink.

In 2014 he again appeared on the Stockholm list, and was elected as a regular member. He has since been re-elected in both the 2018 and 2022 elections.

In February 2022 he was chosen as the new economic spokesperson for the Left Party, succeeding Ulla Andersson.

== Bibliography ==
- Rasismer i Europa (2004). Edited by: Étienne Balibar. Published by Agora. Note that this is an anthology and that Esbati contributed one article.
- Agenda : julafton för allt reaktionärt : bloggtexter 2005-2006 (2006). Edited by: Ali Esbati and Jesper Weithz. Published by Karneval förlag. This publication is a collection of articles from Esbati's blog.
- Kuba på riktigt (2007). Edited by: Ali Esbati and Daniel Suhonen. Published by Murbruk förlag. Note that this is an anthology and as such contains articles by several authors.
- Man kan fly en galning men inte gömma sig för ett samhälle: 10 år efter Utøya (2021). Published by Leopard Förlag.
