= Sun Cats =

Swedish rock and roll band

The Sun Cats are a Swedish rock & roll band founded as Chorus in response to the death of Elvis, changing their name to Sun Cats in 1981. Originally they played 1950s cover songs before writing their own music in the 1980s, their most famous song being Jailhouse Rockabilly. Their sound is comparable to contemporary American cowpunk and rockabilly bands The Blasters and the Stray Cats.

== Lineup ==
- Chris Dahlback - Vocals and guitar
- Lauri Valkonen - Slap bass
- Jarno Tiihonen - Guitar
- Thomas Ryden - Drums

== Discography ==
=== 45s ===
- "Tear It Up - Long Black Cadillac" - 1982
- "Lonesome Train - Blue Feelings" - 1983
- "Rockabilly Boogie - Let It Swing" - 1985
- "Last Generation - Resting In the Corner" - 1985
- "That's All Right, Mama - Hound Dog" - 1992

=== LPs ===
- "Jailhouse Rockabilly" - 1987
- "Rockabilly Party" - 1991

=== CDs ===
- "Good Rockin' Tonight" - 1993
- "The Worrying Kind" - 2004
