= Stormklockan =

Weekly political youth magazine in Sweden (1908–1985)

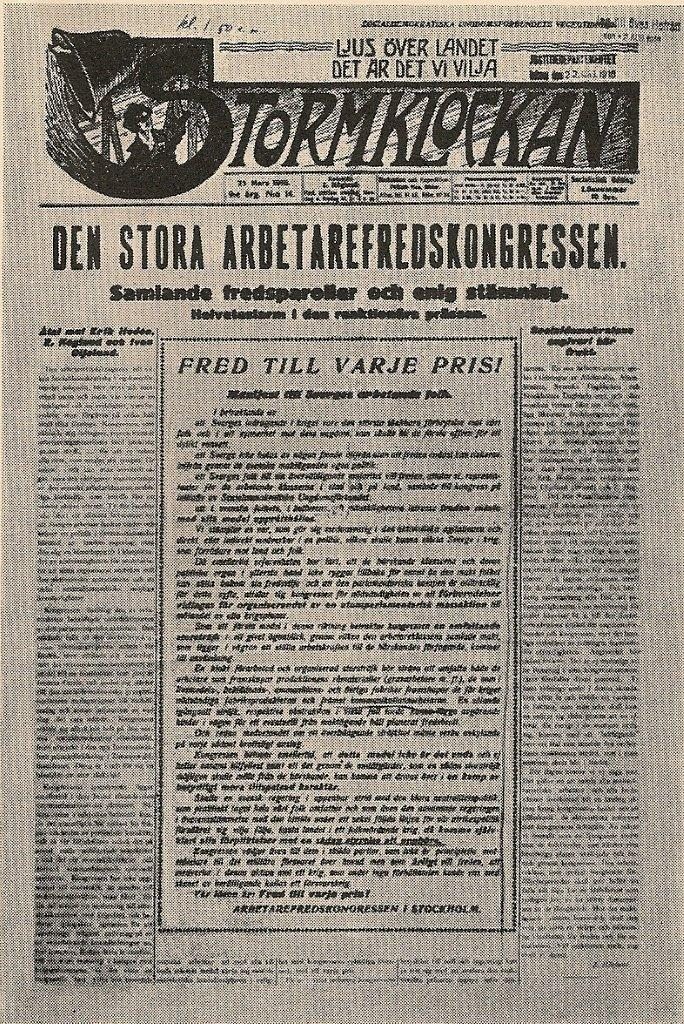
- Cover page of issue 14 dated 1916
- Categories: Political youth magazine
- Frequency: Weekly
- Founded: 1908
- First issue: December 1908
- Final issue: 1985
- Country: Sweden
- Based in: Stockholm
- Language: Swedish
- ISSN: 0039-1980
- OCLC: 225833427

Stormklockan (Swedish: The alarm bell) was a political youth magazine published in Stockholm, Sweden, between 1908 and 1985.

== History and profile ==
Stormklockan was launched in December 1908 in Stockholm. Zeth Höglund was instrumental in the establishment of the magazine which was started as a weekly social democratic publication. Soon after its start the magazine was made the official media outlet of the Social Democratic Youth. Höglund served as its editor-in-chief. One of the contributors in this period was Allan Wallenius, a Swede from Turku.

Over time the magazine left its original ideology and adopted a socialist stance. During its existence it was published by different groups, including Social Democratic Youth, Young Left, Marxist–Leninist Struggle League and Red Youth. In 1917 Stormklockan was seized several times due to its close alliance with the Social Democratic Party. The magazine folded in 1985.
