= Josefin Brink =

Swedish politician (born 1969)

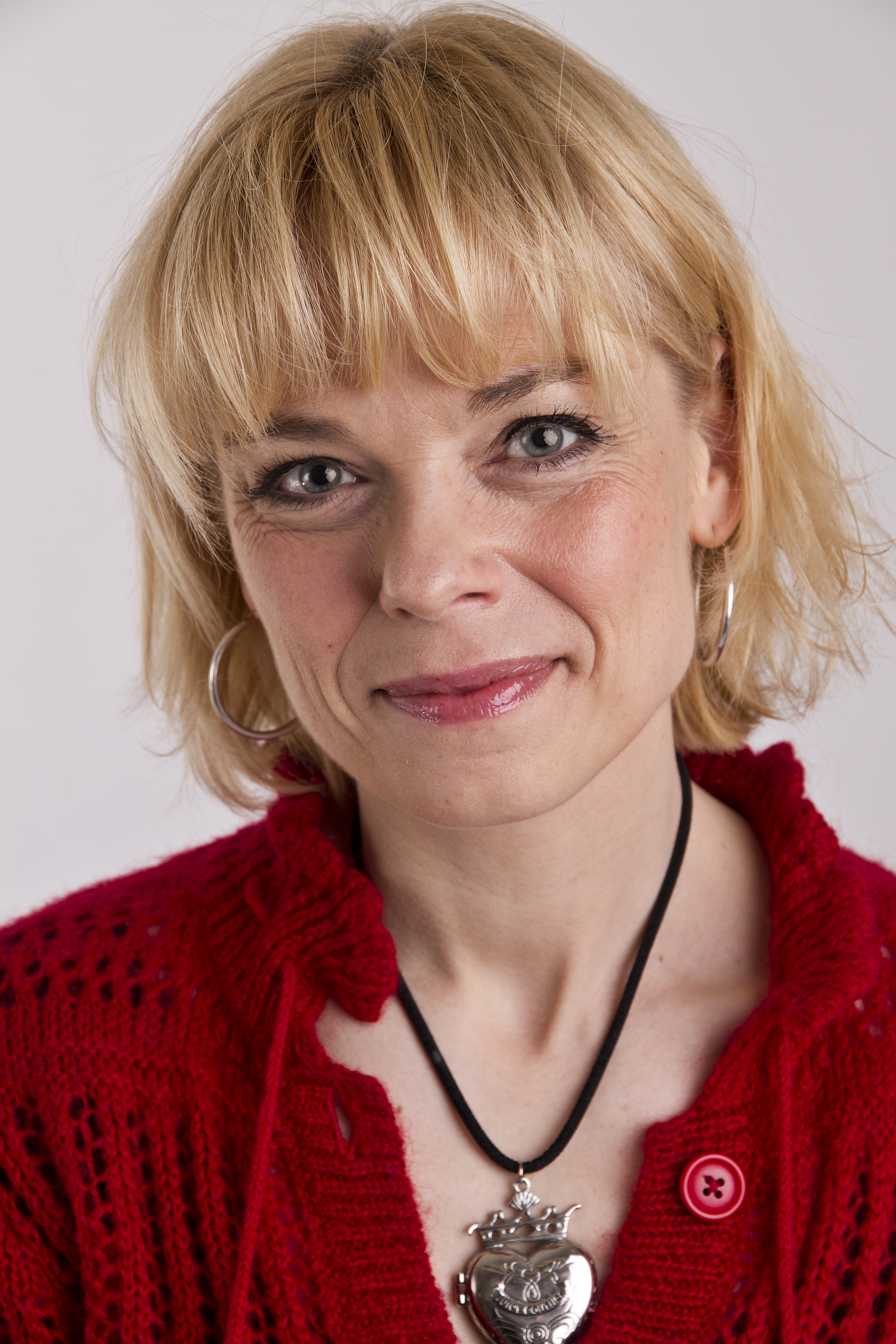
Josefin Brink

Josefin Brink (born 1969) is a Swedish Left Party politician. She has been a member of the Riksdag since 2006. She married Åsa Brunius on 10 July 2011
