= Ny Tid (United States) =

Scandinavian newspaper published in the United States

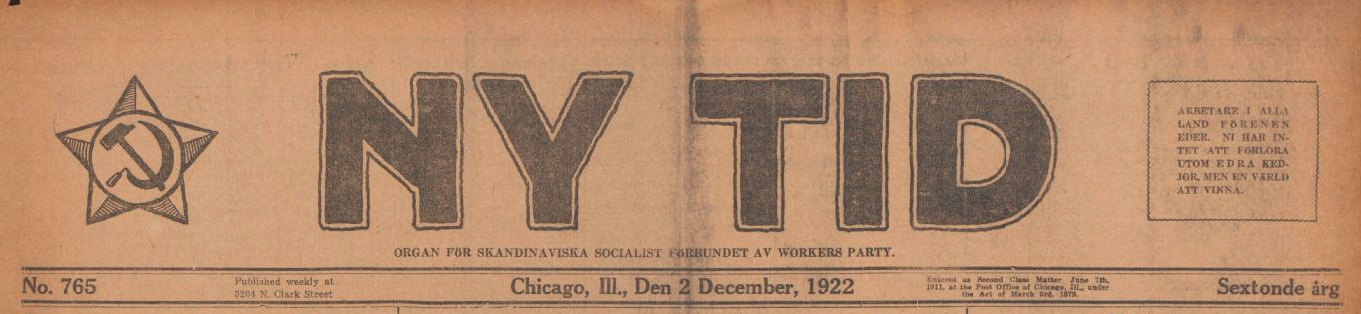
Ny Tid masthead, 1922

Ny Tid ('New Era'), initially known as Svenska Socialisten ('The Swedish Socialist') was a Scandinavian newspaper published in the United States between 1905 and July 1936. Initially issued from Rockford, Illinois, it later shifted to Chicago and New York City. Swedish, Norwegian and Danish languages were used in the newspaper. The circulation of the newspaper varied between 2,000-5,000 copies.

Svenska Socialisten was founded in April 1905 by A.A. Patterson.

In early 1911 the Chicago Scandinavian labor clubs mobilized to move Svenska Socialisten to Chicago, a fundraiser was done and some 800 United States dollars were allocated to facilitate the move. After some bargaining, the Chicago clubs of the Scandinavian Socialist Federation bought the newspaper. On March 29, 1911 a Chicago local edition of Svenska Socialisten, edited by Charles Sand, began to appear. The move of the editorial office to Chicago was fast-tracked after the editor of the newspaper, John Hallden, was elected to the Rockford city council in April 1911 and had to resign from the editorship of Svenska Socialisten. Sand had taken over as editor on May 24, 1911 and the move to Chicago was done on June 7 the same year. The first months in Chicago were tumultuous for the newspaper, as it struggled with economic difficulties. On February 15, 1912 Sand left his position as editor, a position taken over by Oscar Nesvant. Nesvant's tenure was also short-lived. Later the same year Henry Bengston, a young immigrant, took over the editorship. Bengston remained in this post until 1920, when the newspaper moved into a communist direction. The office of Svenska Socialisten was located on 911 Belmont Avenue, Chicago. During the First World War the newspaper suffered difficulties as the United States Post Office often refused to distribute the newspaper.

In 1921 the name of the newspaper was changed to Facklan ('The Torch').

The renaming of the newspaper to Ny Tid came about a month after the merger of the Scandinavian Socialist Federation into the Workers Party of America (the legal front organization for the American communists at the time). The merger into the Workers Party had been preceded with the merger between the former Scandinavian Section of the Socialist Party and the former Scandinavian Federation of the Socialist Labor Party. The erstwhile publication of the expelled Scandinavian Federation of SLP, Folket ('The People'), merged with Ny Tid on March 10, 1922. Ny Tid retained the numbering from Svenska Socialisten/Facklan. The offices of Ny Tid were located on 3204 North Clark Street in Chicago.

In April 1931, publication of the Ny Tid moved from Chicago to New York City. Editors of the paper included Oscar W. Larsen (1922), Charles Fredzen (1922), Daniel Birgers (1922–1925), Allan Wallenius (as "Ellis Peterson") (1925–1929), and Albert Pearson (1929–1936). The paper published a Children's section in English from 1928 to 1932. On April 4, 1931 the newspaper was moved to New York City, in order to expand its influence among workers on the East Coast. On December 8, 1932 Ny Tid began issuing a 4-page Norwegian-Danish, with the main newspaper using Swedish language. The Norwegian-Danish edition became a fully separate newspaper in 1933, but retained the name Ny Tid. On October 25, 1934 a separate edition of Ny Tid for the Mid-West began to appear from Chicago, with Werner Winberg as its editor.

The Norwegian-Danish edition of Ny Tid ceased publication January 2, 1936. Ny Tid closed down July 16, 1936.
