= Filip Björk =

Swedish ice hockey player

- Born: 1 October 1986 (age 40) Sollentuna, Sweden
- Height: 6 ft 0 in (183 cm)
- Weight: 190 lb (86 kg; 13 st 8 lb)
- Position: Defence
- Shot: Right
- Played for: Bakersfield Condors; IF Sundsvall; HK SKP Poprad; Eispiraten Crimmitschau; HK Gomel; Almtuna IS; Arystan Temirtau; Beibarys Atyrau; HC Fassa
- Playing career: 2005–2017

Filip Björk (born 1 October 1986) is a Swedish professional ice hockey defenceman currently an unrestricted free agent who played college hockey in the NCAA for four years then signed with Bakersfield Condors, which at the time, was the NHL team Anaheim Ducks affiliate. Bjork was known for his tough playing style and mobile skating.

He signed a one-year ECHL contract with the Rapid City Rush as a free agent on 26 August 2015. However, he failed to secure a position with the Rush after attending training camp on 13 October 2015. He played professional hockey in America, Europe, Belarus and Kazakhstan before retiring due to a facial injury that occurred during an ice hockey game.

== Career statistics ==
			Regular season					Playoffs
Season	Team	League	GP	G	A	Pts	PIM	GP	G	A	Pts	PIM
2001–02	Nacka HK J18	J18 Div. 1	23	7	5	12	—	—	—	—	—	—
2001–02	Nacka HK J20	J20 Div. 1	1	1	0	1	0	—	—	—	—	—
2002–03	Nacka HK J18	J18 Div. 1	1	0	2	2	0	—	—	—	—	—
2002–03	Nacka HK J20	J20 Div. 1	27	3	10	13	—	—	—	—	—	—
2003–04	Linköping HC J18	J18 Elit	13	0	4	4	—	—	—	—	—	—
2003–04	Linköping HC J18	J18 Allsvenskan	14	0	3	3	8	4	1	1	2	2
2004–05	Hammarby IF J20	J20 SuperElit	28	1	5	6	24	—	—	—	—	—
2004–05	Team Uppsala	Allsvenskan	2	0	0	0	0	—	—	—	—	—
2005–06	Hammarby IF J18	J18 Allsvenskan	1	1	1	2	4	—	—	—	—	—
2005–06	Hammarby IF J20	J20 SuperElit	41	0	12	12	64	4	1	0	1	4
2006–07	New England College	NCAA III	16	0	1	1	8	—	—	—	—	—
2007–08	New England College	NCAA III	16	2	2	4	27	—	—	—	—	—
2008–09	New England College	NCAA III	23	1	9	10	28	—	—	—	—	—
2009–10	New England College	NCAA III	17	0	5	5	10	—	—	—	—	—
2009–10	Bakersfield Condors	ECHL	3	0	0	0	4	—	—	—	—	—
2010–11	IF Sundsvall Hockey	HockeyAllsvenskan	26	0	2	2	16	—	—	—	—	—
2010–11	HK Poprad	Slovak	2	0	0	0	0	—	—	—	—	—
2010–11	Eispiraten Crimmitschau	Germany2	11	0	5	5	10	—	—	—	—	—
2011–12	HK Gomel	Belarus	37	1	5	6	63	7	0	1	1	0
2012–13	Almtuna IS	HockeyAllsvenskan	33	0	4	4	67	—	—	—	—	—
2013–14	Arystan Temirtau	Kazakhstan	23	1	10	11	18	—	—	—	—	—
2013–14	Beibarys Atyrau	Kazakhstan	12	1	2	3	47	6	0	1	1	6
2014–15	HC Fassa	Italy	35	6	16	22	103	—	—	—	—	—
2015–16	Pensacola Ice Flyers	SPHL	3	0	1	1	0	—	—	—	—	—
2015–16	Ducs de Dijon	Ligue Magnus	13	0	7	7	46	—	—	—	—	—
2016–17	HC Fassa	AlpsHL	6	0	2	2	10	—	—	—	—	—
ECHL totals			3	0	0	0	4	—	—	—	—	—
Allsvenskan totals			2	0	0	0	0	—	—	—	—	—
HockeyAllsvenskan totals			59	0	6	6	83	—	—	—	—	—
Slovak totals			2	0	0	0	0	—	—	—	—	—
Belarus totals			37	1	5	6	63	7	0	1	1	0
Kazakhstan totals			35	2	12	14	65	6	0	1	1	6
