= Joachim Persson (bandy) =

Swedish bandy player (born 1979)

Joachim Persson (born 2 December 1979) is a Swedish retired bandy player. Joachim was a youth product of IK Sirius. Joachim made his first team debut for IK Sirius in the 1998/99 season.

Joachim played for two clubs:

- IK Sirius (1998–2004, 2008–2012)
- Västerås SK (2004–2008)
