= Gunnar Domeij =

Swedish former goalkeeper in floorball

Gunnar Domeij (born 1976) is a Swedish former goalkeeper in floorball. He won the World Cup with the national team of Sweden in 2006 and quit in the national team thereafter. He has represented Umeå City IBK, Örnsköldsvik IBK and Jönköpings IK in the Swedish Super League. He retired in 2012. In 2017 he made a comeback and played for Örnsköldsvik IBK throughout the season.
