= Anneli Heed =

Swedish comedian and voice actress

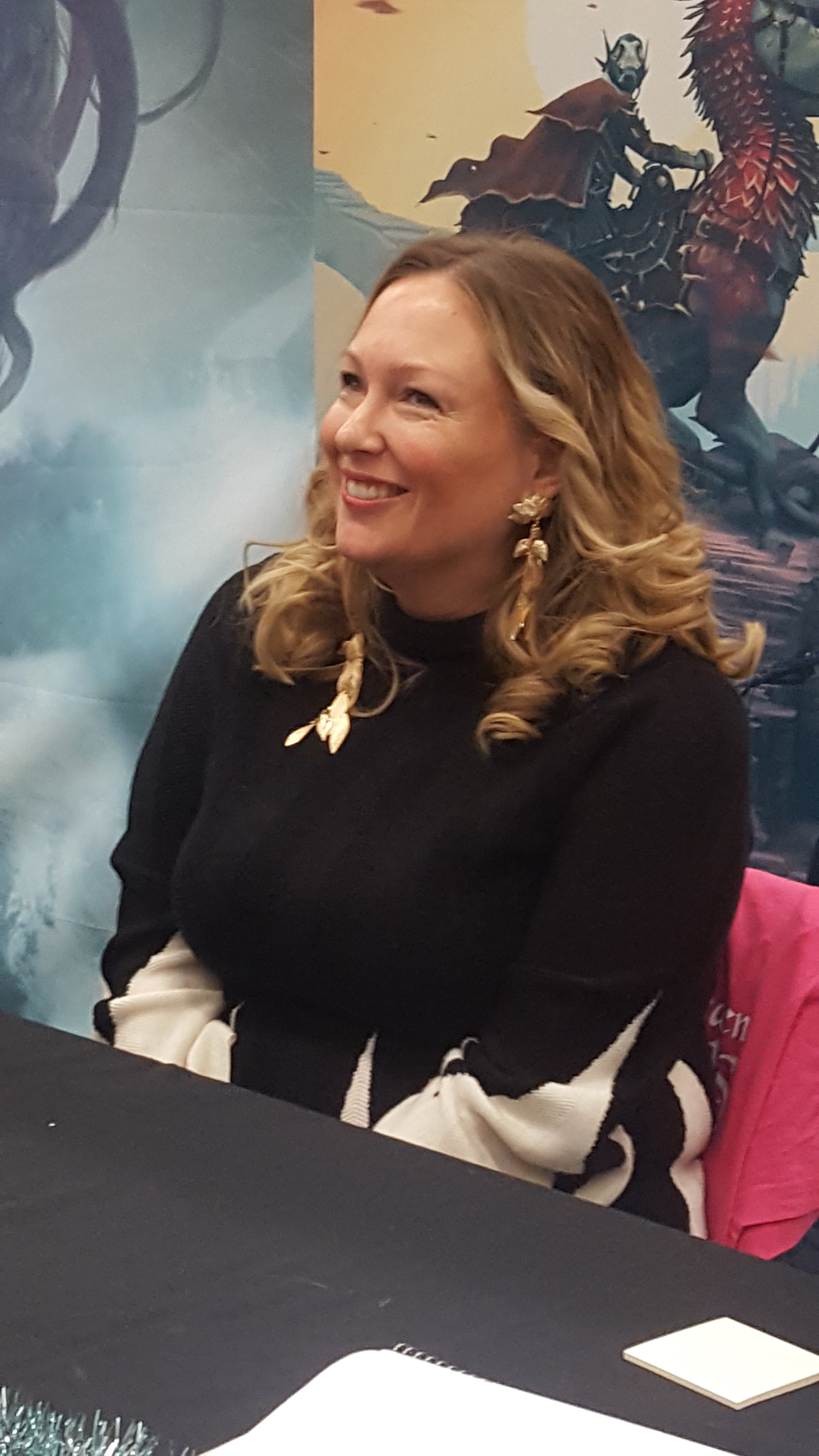
Anneli Heed at Stockholm International Fairs in 2018.

Anneli Heed (née Ahlgren; born August 20, 1978) is a Swedish stand-up comedian, impersonator, and voice actress/dubber currently living in Stockholm.

== Filmography ==
=== Animation ===
- Hotel for Dogs (Swedish dub)
- Tess och Ubbe – Skip
- Monsters vs Aliens (Swedish dub)
- Kid vs Kat (Swedish dub) – Coop
- My Little Pony: Pinkie Pie's Ferriswheel Adventures (Swedish dub) – Scootaloo
- Dinosaur Train (Swedish dub) – Dan
- Fish Hooks (Swedish dub) – Bea
- Meningen med Hugo – The parrot
- Cars 2 (Swedish dub) – Mater's computer
- My Little Pony: Friendship is Magic (Swedish dub) – Spike, Sweetie Belle (episode 18 onwards), Cheerilee, Spitfire (episode 26), Photo Finish, Princess Cadance, Queen Chrysalis, singing voice of Rainbow Dash and several background characters.
- Transformers: Prime (Swedish dub) – Arcee
- Kung Fu Panda 2 (Swedish dub) – Tigress
- Littlest Pet Shop (Swedish dub) – The Biskit Twins, Sugar Sprinkles
- Kitty Is Not a Cat (Swedish dub) – Miley
