= 1990 in Sweden =

- Decades: 1970s; 1980s; 1990s; 2000s; 2010s
- See also: Other events of 1990; Timeline of Swedish history

Events from the year 1990 in Sweden

== Incumbents ==
- Monarch – Carl XVI Gustaf
- Prime Minister – Ingvar Carlsson

== Events ==
=== January ===
- 2 January – Swedish newspapers Kvällsposten and GT merge to form iDag.
- 3 January – ANC leader Oliver Tambo arrives in Sweden for treatment at a clinic in Stockholm following a stroke in August 1989 and the imminent closure of the London clinic he was at previously.
- 7 January – A Swedish delegation heads to Bulgaria to assess whether it is safe for Bulgarian Turkish refugees to be returned. Following the 1989 expulsion of Turks from Bulgaria, 20,000 refugees had arrived in Sweden since August. The government decides to set limits and 1,000 refugees go on hunger strike in protest.
- 10 January – Swedish Minister for Finance Kjell-Olof Feldt delivers his final budget package.
- 12 January – Prime Minister Ingvar Carlsson performs a cabinet reshuffle. Birgitta Dahl is replaced as Minister for Energy by Rune Molin.
- 16 January – The first of five court cases in 1990 for Björn Borg begins, facing an $82 million business lawsuit brought by Lars Skarke former business partner and managing director of Björn Borg Design Group.
- 19 January – August Malmström's oil painting Grindslanten is sold for 13 million kronor.
- 22 January
  - Björn Borg's libel case against Swedish satirical magazine Z begins. He sues the publication for $600,000 for alleging he abused drugs.
  - A court in Uppsala authorises the confiscation of more clothes belonging to Mohamed Abu Talb, suspect in the Lockerbie bombing, for testing against those found in the wreckage.
- 23 January – A Piper PA-31 Navajo crashes on approach to Hudiksvall Airport killing all three people aboard.
- 29 January – After going on a partial strike demanding a 21% pay increase, The Bank Institute Employer's Association (BAO) locked out 62,000 bank workers and closes the banks as part of the ongoing financial crisis.

=== February ===
- 2 February – After South African President F.W. de Klerk announces he is legalising the ANC and other groups, Walter Sisulu in Stockholm with other ANC leaders visiting Oliver Tambo praise the decision but call for further progress including the release of Nelson Mandela.
- 8 February
  - Prime Minister Ingvar Carlsson states that the economy is “falling apart” and that his minority government will resign unless parliament passes a ban on strikes and impose a two-year freeze on wages.
  - Finance Minister Kjell-Olof Feldt outlines the government's plan in parliament which includes a two-year freeze on local taxes, rents and stock dividends.
- 15 February – Failing to gain the needed support of any opposition parties, the government's economic bill is defeated 190–153. Immediately after the defeat Prime Minister Ingvar Carlsson goes to the office of parliamentary speaker Thage G. Peterson to give the government's resignation.
- 16 February
  - Finance Minister Kjell-Olof Feldt resigns from the day-old caretaker government, telling a news conference he did not have the political backing or personal will to scrap his plans and start over, instead choosing to step aside for “younger and better forces” to take his place. Odd Engström is announced as Feldt's replacement.
  - The bank employee's union and bankers’ association announce the end of their three week long labour dispute.
  - Björn Borg and his wife Loredana lose their $40,000 libel lawsuit against Hänt i Vacken after the magazine alleged the latter was unfaithful.
- 19 February – After opposition leader Carl Bildt of the Moderate Party is unable to form a centre-right coalition, Speaker Thage G. Peterson asks Ingvar Carlsson if he can form a government.
- 23 February
  - Speaker Thage G. Peterson informed the Riksdag that he asked Ingvar Carlsson to form another cabinet with a vote to be held on the 26th February.
  - After a year of negotiations, Swedish car maker Volvo and France’s Renault agree to invest in each other’s companies in transactions worth $4.8 billion.
- 26 February – The proposal to appoint Ingvar Carlsson as Prime Minister passed 175–101 with 59 abstentions. The Social Democratic Party with 156 seats won the support of the 21 seat Communist Party whilst the Centre Party and Green Party both abstained. The Moderate Party and People's Party voted against calling for immediate elections instead of in 18 months.
- 27 February
  - The second cabinet of Ingvar Carlsson assumed office. Former chief of the Swedish Market Labour Board Allan Larsson is made Minister for Finance. Odd Engström who acted as Minister for Finance in the caretaker government is appointed as Deputy Prime Minister. Engström was replaced in his original position as assistant to the finance minister by Erik Åasbrink who had been State Secretary of Treasury.
  - Vasaloppet is cancelled for the first time since 1934 due to a lack of snow, 12,000 skiers including 1,647 from 27 countries had already arrived in Sälen to take part.

=== March ===
- 1 March – Expressen reports at least ten ice hockey and bandy players may be involved in a gambling scandal worth millions. Bets placed on Västra Frölunda HC to lose three matches in a row resulted in a 20,000,000 Kronor loss for state-owned Tipstjänst arousing suspicion.
- 5 March – Whilst visiting Sweden on a book tour, Soviet politician Boris Yeltsin announces he may seek the presidency following the 1990 Russian Supreme Soviet election.
- 12 March – Nelson Mandela and his wife Winnie, arrive at Stockholm Arlanda Airport to crowds on his first visit to a European country since his release from prison in February. At Haga Palace, he meets with fellow ANC leader Oliver Tambo for the first time since 1962.
- 13 March – Prime Minister Ingvar Carlsson and Nelson Mandela hold a two hour meeting and Mandela makes his first address to any parliament, the Riksdag.
- 20 March – A treasury official confirms that starting in 1991 children will pay income tax, in an effort to curb parents using their child’s account as a way to avoid tax and as part of the Tax Reform of the Century.
- 22 March – Sweden’s military is put on a higher state of alert after Lithuania declares its independence from the Soviet Union. President of the Soviet Union Mikhail Gorbachev orders Lithuanians to turn in their weapons and a military convoy is dispatched to Vilnius. Gotland prepares for an influx of refugees should the situation escalate.
- 27 March – The Foreign Ministry announces the expulsion of a Soviet trade official for alleged espionage.
- 28 March – After years of deliberating Skansen's board decides it can’t afford the expansion of its elephant facilities to comply with new laws. Nika and Shiva, the elephants of Skansen are to be sold to another Swedish zoo or moved abroad sparking protests and public outcry.
- 29 March – Six police chiefs are charged with wiretapping Kurdish immigrants in their investigation into the 1986 assassination of Prime Minister Olof Palme. Those charged include former National Police Commissioner Holger Romander, former head of the Swedish Security Service Sven-Åke Hjälmroth and Hans Holmer former Stockholm police chief who lead the murder probe.
- March – The Monday Movement, in support of the Baltic states independence from the Soviet Union, begins holding public demonstrations at Norrmalmstorg which continues every Monday for 79 weeks until September 1991 when independence was gained.

=== April ===
- 4 April – Two shipping agents in Gothenburg are the first people charged with violating the 1987 trade embargo against South Africa because of Apartheid.
- 7 April – A fire breaks out on the passenger ferry MS Scandinavian Star, 158 people are killed with the 159th victim dying two weeks later in hospital.
- 9 April – A Swedish delegation scheduled to visit Lithuania later in the month has their visas blocked by Soviet officials with tensions remaining high after Lithuania declared its independence from the Soviet Union in March.
- 10 April
  - A train derailment near Sköldinge, 60 miles southwest of Stockholm, kills 2 and injures 41. An issue with ATC and a signal beacon meant the train was going 80mph instead of the expected 25mph.
  - Memorials for the victims of the fire on MS Scandinavian Star are held in Oslo, Norway and Lysekil, Sweden. In Lysekil where the ferry was towed to and the fire extinguished, work continues on the recovery of the victims as 126 have been brought off the ship.
- 19 April – The government announces it will award at least 100,000 kronor to Christer Pettersson, the man acquitted of the assassination of Prime Minister Olaf Palme, for the 10 months he spent in custody.
- 27 April – As part of its effort to expand its European production, Sweden’s oldest company Stora AB acquires West German company Feldmühle Nobel for 14 billion SEK, one of the largest acquisitions in Europe at the time. Earlier in the month it acquired equal ownership of France’s Chapelle Darblay with Finnish company Kymmene.

=== May ===
- 2 May – Chancellor of Justice Hans Stark awards Christer Pettersson, the man exonerated of the 1986 assassination of Prime Minister Olaf Palme, 300,000 SEK for the 10 months he spent in custody.
- 11 May – Mikael Reuterswärd becomes the first Swede to reach the summit of Mount Everest. Oskar Kihlborg another Swede reached the summit shortly after.
- 12 May – Tomas Robert-Naali sets a new record of 1:01:54 at the Göteborgsvarvet half marathon with fellow Tanzanian Nada Saktay finishing two seconds slower. Midde Hamrin a Swedish native living in the United States won the women’s race for a record equalling fourth time in 1:12:45.
- 14 May
  - Swedish satirical magazine Z is ordered to pay Björn Borg $12,500 for defaming him after they reported he used cocaine.
  - 70 miles southeast of Karlskrona, Soviet tanker Volgoneft 263 and West German freighter Betty collide in the Baltic Sea with the tanker leaking 1,000 tons of crude oil.
- 17 May – Katarina Church in Stockholm is destroyed by a fire leaving only the outer walls and crossbeams remaining. The church had suffered a previous fire in 1723 and was rebuilt and reopened for a second time in 1995.
- 18 May – Air traffic controllers refuse to work overtime leading to the cancellation of 40 domestic flights and delays of up to 3 hours for international flights. They negotiated for higher pay for the extra hours arguing authorities had left them short-staffed when failing to anticipate increased air traffic.
- 21–22 May – 150 diplomats, government officials and international law experts attend a two-day seminar arranged by Sweden’s Institute of Foreign Affairs on the topic of Baltic independence ahead of U.S. President George H. W. Bush and Soviet leader Mikhail Gorbachev's summit.
- 26 May – Left Party - the Communists (Vänsterpartiet Kommunisterna) members vote to drop the word ‘Communist’ from its name becoming the Left Party (Vänsterpartiet).
- 27 May – Mack Lobell wins the Elitloppet for the second time in a world record equalling time.
- 28 May – Börje Salming ends his career in the NHL after 17 years, returning to Sweden to play for AIK.

=== July ===
- 7–8 July – Stefan Edberg of Sweden defeats defending champion Boris Becker of Germany winning the 1990 Wimbledon Championships – Men's Singles

=== Undated ===
- The city of Västerås celebrates its 1,000th anniversary.

== Popular culture ==
=== Film ===
- 5 February – The 25th Guldbagge Awards were presented
- Black Jack
- Blankt vapen (Blank weapon)
- Den hemliga vännen (The secret friend)
- Gjutarna (The Iron Founders)
- God afton, Herr Wallenberg (Good Evening, Mr. Wallenberg)
- Gränslots (Border Guide)
- Hemligheten (The Secret)
- Hjälten (The Hero)
- Honungsvargar (Honey wolves)
- I hired a Contract Killer
- I skog och mark (In the forest and on the ground)
- Jag skall bli Sveriges Rembrandt eller dö! (I will become Sweden's Rembrandt or die!)
- Kurt Olsson – filmen om mitt liv som mej själv (Kurt Olsson – the film about my life as myself)
- Nils Karlsson Pyssling
- Tåg till Himlen (Train to Heaven)
- The Match Factory Girl
- Werther

=== Literature ===
- 16 March – The Royal Library in Stockholm publishes 42,000 letters left by author Selma Lagerlöf, that she requested in her will should not be made public until 50 years after her death.
- Lars Ahlin – De sotarna! De sotarna!
- Jan Arnald – Chiosmassakern
- Gunilla Bergström – Alfons egna saker
- Ernst Brunner – Sorgen per capita
- Sven Delblanc – Ifigenia
- Jonas Gardell – Fru Björks öden och äventyr
- Olle Häger – Svart på vitt
- Gunnar Harding – Mannen och paraplyet and Mitt Vinterland
- Jan Arvid Hellström – Pastorn klipper till
- Anders Jacobsson and Sören Olsson – Berts första betraktelser and Berts vidare betraktelser
- P. C. Jerslid – Humpty-Dumptys fall
- P. C. Jerslid and Lars Ardelius – Slutet: En livsåskådningsbok
- George Johansson – Isplaneten: En berättelse från Yttre Rymden
- Viveca Lärn – Mimmi får en farfar
- Astrid Lindgren – Visst är Lotta en glad unge
- Torgny Lindgren and Eric Åkerlund – Den röda slöjan (under the joint pseudonym Hans Lamborn)
- Ivar Lo-Johansson – Blå Jungfrun and Tisteldalen (both posthumously)
- Bodil Malmsten – Nefertiti i Berlin
- Jan Mårtenson – Akilles häl
- Jan Myrdal – Fem år av frihet
- Peter Nilson – Messias med träbenet
- Bruno K. Öijer – Medan giftet växer
- Peter Pohl – Kan ingen hjälpa Anette?
- Tobjörn Säfve – En gentleman äntrar ringen and Skulle jag sörja, då vore jag tokot
- Håkan Sandell – Skampåle

== Births ==
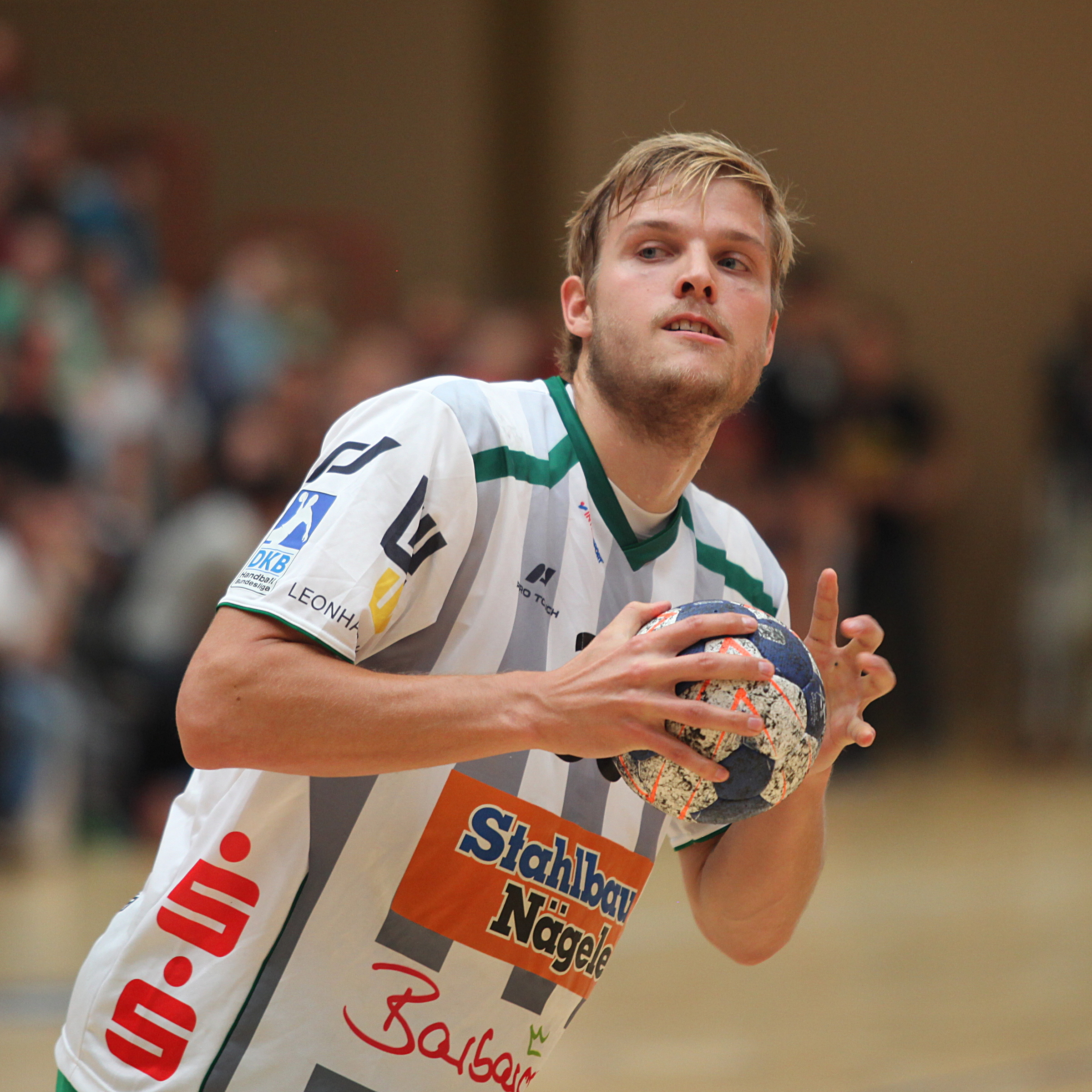
Anton Halén

- 15 January – Emil Herge, footballer
- 22 January – Rasmus Törnblom, politician
- 27 January – Rasmus Jönsson, footballer
- 31 January – Jacob Markström, ice hockey goaltender
- 9 February – Daniel Brodin, ice hockey player
- 21 February – Mattias Tedenby, ice hockey player
- 25 February – Anton Gustafsson, ice hockey player
- 5 March – Freddy Åsblom, actor
- 6 March – Sebastian Stålberg, ice hockey player
- 10 March – Calle Lindh, alpine skier
- 19 March – Anders Nilsson, ice hockey goaltender
- 24 March – Frida von Schewen, singer
- 31 March
  - Markus Olsson, handball player
  - Sandra Roma, tennis player
- 1 April – Samuel Haus, actor
- 13 April – Linus Svenning, singer
- 17 April – Astrit Ajdarević, Swedish-Albanian footballer
- 23 April – Sofia Jakobsson, footballer
- 27 April – Robin Bengtsson, singer and songwriter
- 24 May – Mattias Ekholm, ice hockey player
- 25 May – Simon Gustafsson, speedway rider
- 26 May – Mervan Celik, footballer
- 27 May – Marcus Krüger, ice hockey player
- 31 May – Erik Karlsson, ice hockey player
- 7 June – Magnus Nygren, ice hockey player
- 12 June – Jessica Ohlson, politician
- 3 July – Dennis Rasmussen, ice hockey player
- 18 July – Melker Karlsson, ice hockey player
- 9 August – Bill Skarsgård, actor
- 21 August – Marcus Berggren, comedian
- 24 August – Sofia Dalén, presenter and comedian
- 28 August
  - Ariel Petsonk, child actor
  - Henrik Tömmerenes, ice hockey player
- 2 September – Marcus Ericsson, racing driver
- 15 September – Alexander Fällström, ice hockey player
- 18 September – Alexandra Höglund, footballer
- 25 September – Margaux Dietz, television personality and blogger
- 6 October – Marcus Johansson, ice hockey player
- 13 October – Jakob Silfverberg, ice hockey player
- 19 October – Janet Leon, singer
- 29 October – Eric Saade, singer
- 1 November – Simone Giertz, inventor and YouTuber
- 25 November – Ted Brithén, ice hockey player
- 28 November – Anton Halén, handball player
- 18 December – Victor Hedman, ice hockey player
- 20 December – Alexander Urbom, ice hockey player
- 23 December – Oscar Jansson, footballer
- 25 December – Lisa Larsen, cross country skier and orienteer

=== Undated ===
- Magdalena Olsson, orienteering and ski orienteering competitor.

== Deaths ==
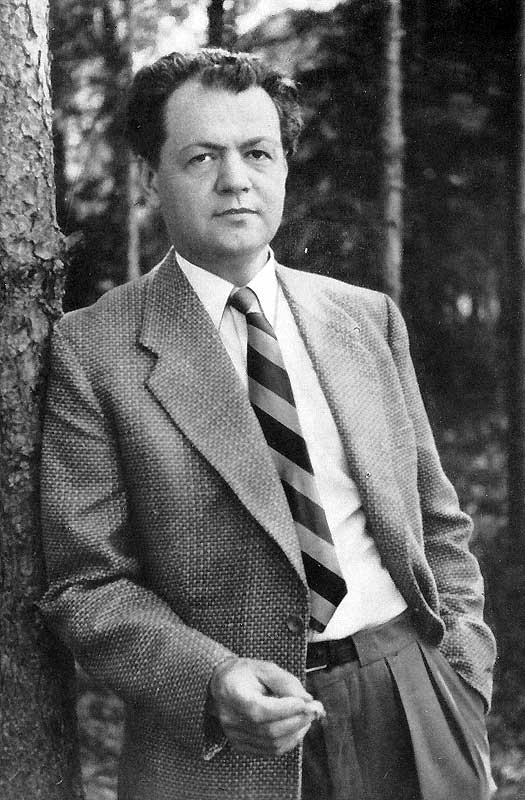
Sven Rosendahl

- 2 January – Nils Kyndel, composer and pianist (born 1905)
- 14 January – Sten-Åke Cederhök, actor and comedian (born 1913)
- 17 January – Eric Stolpe, actor, revue artist and singer (born 1919)
- 25 January – Åke Hedtjärn, civil engineer (born 1907)
- 28 January – Einar Bager, artist and historian (born 1887)
- 30 January – John Lindgren, skier and Olympian (1932) (born 1899)
- 1 February – Lauritz Falk, actor and film director (born 1909)
- 10 February – Knut Hansson, footballer (born 1911)
- 12 February – Tor Bergner, poet, troubadour and composer (1913)
- 15 February – Ulf Johanson, actor (born 1922)
- 18 February
  - Herman Carlsson, ice hockey player and Olympian (1936) (born 1906)
  - Tor Isedal, actor (born 1924)
- 23 February – Margareta Bergman, actress (born 1901)
- 24 February – Aina Erlander, lecturer, wife of Tage Erlander (born 1902)
- 27 February
  - Eric Sörenson, equestrian and Olympian (1948) (born 1913)
  - Arthur Österwall, band leader and composer (born 1910)
- 28 February
  - Erik Anderberg, naval officer (born 1892)
  - Erik Upmark, civil servant and civil engineer (born 1904)
- 8 March
  - Karin Kavli, actress (born 1906)
  - Asmund Arle, sculptor (born 1918)
- 10 March – Olle Ekbladh, actor (born 1906)
- 18 March – Birgitta Lilliehöök, cartoonist, illustrator, journalist and author (born 1899)
- 23 March – Walter Dickson, author (born 1916)
- 25 March – Bertil Linde, ice hockey player and Olympian (1928) (born 1907)
- 26 March – Brūno Kalniņš, Russian-Swedish politician (born 1899)
- 31 March – Knut Ansgar Nelson, Danish-Swedish Roman Catholic prelate (born 1906)
- 7 April – Kristian Gestrin, Finnish judge and politician (born 1929)
- 8 April – Bellan Roos, actress (born 1901)
- 9 April – Yngve Lindgren, footballer (born 1912)
- 11 April – Ivar Lo-Johansson, writer (born 1901)
- 15 April – Greta Garbo, Swedish-American actress (born 1905)
- 17 April – Sigvard Törnqvist, equestrian, actor and composer (born 1912)
- 22 April – Gustaf Wejnarth, Olympic runner (1924) (born 1902)
- 24 April – Erik Eriksson, footballer (born 1914)
- 1 May – Yvonne Floyd, screenwriter (born 1937)
- 8 May – Severt Dennolf, Olympic long-distance runner (1948) (born 1920)
- 12 May – Albert Öberg, Olympic long-distance runner (1912) (born 1888)
- 18 May – Eje Thelin, trombonist (born 1938)
- 21 May – Lily Strömberg-von Essen, Olympic tennis player (1920, 1924) (born 1896)
- 27 May – Gunnar Lindkvist, actor and revue artist (born 1916)
- 28 May – Emma Wiberg, damask weaver (born 1901)
- 30 May – Egil Holmsen, film director, screenwriter, journalist, author and actor (born 1917)
- 31 May – Elsa Hofgren, actress (born 1895)
- 3 June – Aino Taube, actress (born 1912)
- 5 June – Nils Brandt, Finnish-Swedish actor (born 1932)
- 6 June – Banjo-Lasse, guitarist and banjo player (born 1902)
- 10 June – Hanna Olsen, Olympic fencer (1924, 1928) (born 1889)
- 13 June – Kjell Stensson, radio engineer, radio personality and author (born 1917)
- 26 June – Anni Blomqvist, Finnish-Swedish novelist (born 1909)
- 19 July – Ulf Qvarsebo, actor (born 1931)
- 24 July – Harald Moberg, agronomist (born 1906)
- 30 July – Gustaf Jonsson, Olympic cross country skier (1928, 1932) (born 1903)
- 19 August – Thage Nordholm, artist (born 1927)
- 26 August – Sture Ericson, Olympic modern pentathlete (1960) (born 1929)
- 27 August – Tyra Ryman, actress (born 1902)
- 28 August – Eva Stiberg, actress (born 1920)
- 8 September – Sven Rosendahl, journalist and novelist (born 1913)
- 11 September – Julius Jacobsen, Danish-Swedish composer and pianist (born 1915)
- 18 September – Claude Loyola Allgén, composer (born 1920)
- 25 September – Wilfred Burns, composer (born 1917)
- 6 October – Märta Dorff, actress (born 1909)
- 8 October – Eric Wennström, Olympic hurdler (1928) (born 1909)
- 9 October – Lars Thörn, Olympic Sailor (1956, 1964) (born 1904)
- 14 October – Carin Swensson, actress and singer (born 1905)
- 9 November – Dora Söderberg, actress (born 1899)
- 19 November – Lennart Ljung, general (born 1921)
- 20 November – Bengt Odhner, diplomat (born 1918)
- 23 November – Ragnar Thorngren, jockey (born 1915)
- 28 November – Birger Bohlin, palaeontologist (born 1898)
- 5 December – Kai Curry-Lindahl, zoologist (born 1917)
- 21 December – Magda Julin, figure skater, Olympic champion (1920) (born 1894)
- 22 December – Henning Sundesson, Olympic long-distance runner (1936) (born 1909)
- 27 December – Hubert Persson, Olympic wrestler (1952) (born 1918)

=== Undated ===
- Antal Biró, Hungarian-Swedish artist (born 1907)
