= 1991 in Sweden =

- Decades: 1970s; 1980s; 1990s; 2000s; 2010s
- See also: Other events of 1991; Timeline of Swedish history

Events from the year 1991 in Sweden

== Incumbents ==
- Monarch – Carl XVI Gustaf
- Prime Minister – Ingvar Carlsson, succeeded by Carl Bildt

== Events ==
- 15 September – 1991 Swedish general election and 1991 Swedish municipal elections
- The Djurö National Park was established

== Popular culture ==
=== Film ===
- 11 February – The 26th Guldbagge Awards were presented

== Births ==
- 24 January – Andreas Forsström, professional ice hockey player
- 13 February – Pontus Jansson, football player
- 22 February – Tobias Ludvigsson, cyclist
- 30 March – AronChupa, rapper, singer, songwriter, DJ and record producer
- 21 April – Kenza Zouiten, fashion model
- 24 April – Elisa Lindström, singer
- 26 April – Adrian Granat, professional boxer
- 11 May – Marcus Rohdén, football player
- 29 May – Oskar Eriksson, curler, Olympic medalist 2014
- 29 May – Tom Ljungman, actor
- 6 July – Klas Dahlbeck, ice hockey player
- 9 July – Clara Mae, singer
- 7 November – Felix Rosenqvist, racing driver
- 11 December – Anna Bergendahl, singer
- Unknown date – Amanda Lindblad, politician

== Deaths ==
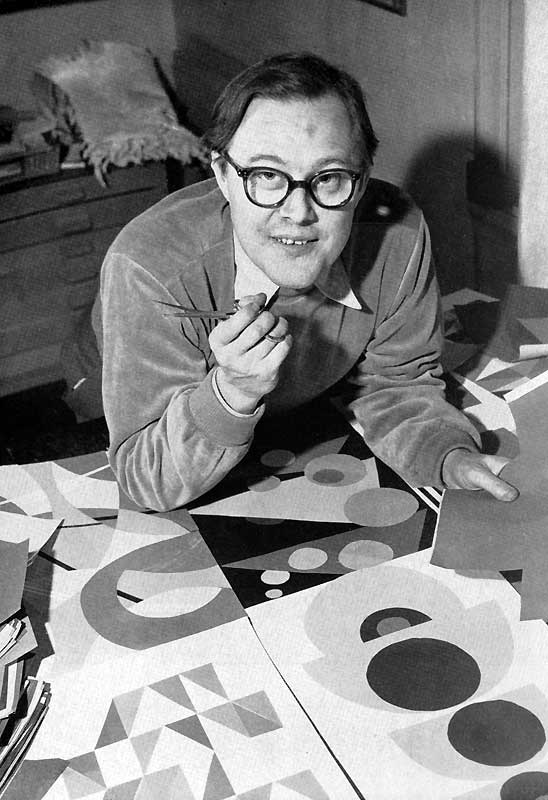
Sandro Key-Åberg

- 26 January – Hans Strååt, film actor (born 1917)
- 27 January – Leif Wikström, sailor, Olympic champion 1956 (born 1918)
- 15 February – Birger Malmsten, actor (born 1920)
- 13 March – Göran Strindberg, cinematographer (born 1917)
- 8 April – Per Yngve Ohlin, known as "Dead", rock musician (born 1969)
- 26 April – Lars Hall, modern pentathlete, Olympic champion 1952 and 1956 (born 1927).
- 17 May – Göthe Grefbo, actor (born 1921)
- 5 June – Carl-Erik Holmberg, football player (born 1906)
- 30 June – Curt Weibull, cyclist (born 1907).
- 5 July – Sandro Key-Åberg, writer (born 1922).
- 30 September – Sven Barthel, journalist (born 1903)
- 9 November – Hans Liljedahl, sport shooter, Olympic medalist 1952 (born 1913).
- 10 November – Gunnar Gren, footballer (born 1920).
- 10 November – Curt Weibull, historian (born 1886)
- 16 November – Gustav Wetterström, football player (born 1911)

=== Full date missing ===
- Olle Hansson, cross country skier (born 1904)
- Torsten Löwgren, painter (born 1903)
- Åke Åkerström, archaeologist (born 1902)

== See also ==
- 1991 in Swedish television
