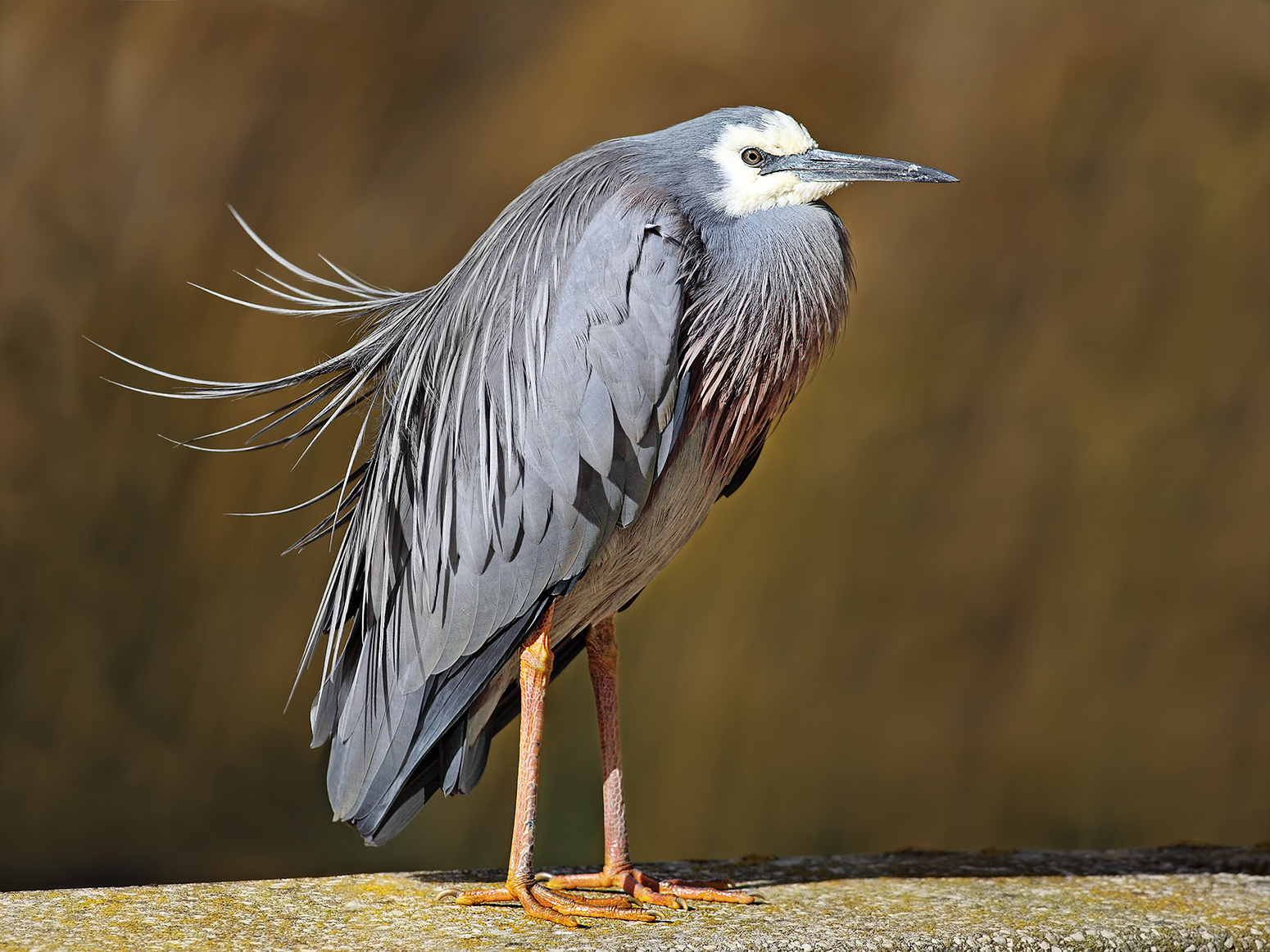
- The white-faced heron in breeding plumage, in a characteristic resting pose.

Conservation status
- Least Concern (IUCN 3.1)

Scientific classification
- Kingdom: Animalia
- Phylum: Chordata
- Class: Aves
- Order: Pelecaniformes
- Family: Ardeidae
- Genus: Egretta
- Species: E. novaehollandiae

Binomial name
- Egretta novaehollandiae (Latham, 1790)

Synonyms
- Ardea novaehollandiae Notophoyx novaehollandiae

= White-faced heron =

Species of bird

The white-faced heron (Egretta novaehollandiae) also known as the white-fronted heron, and incorrectly as the grey heron, or blue crane, is a common bird throughout most of Australasia, including New Guinea, the islands of Torres Strait, Indonesia, New Zealand, and all but the driest areas of Australia.

It is a medium-sized heron, pale, slightly bluish-grey, with yellow legs and white facial markings. It can be found almost anywhere near shallow water, fresh or salt, and although it is prompt to depart the scene on long, slow-beating wings if disturbed, it will boldly raid suburban fish ponds.

== Taxonomy ==
The white-faced heron was formally described in 1790 by the English ornithologist John Latham. He placed it with the herons in the genus Ardea and coined the binomial name Ardea novaehollandiae. Latham based his account on the "white-fronted heron" that had been described and illustrated in 1789 by the first Governor of New South Wales Arthur Phillip in his book The Voyage of Governor Phillip to Botany Bay.

It was historically considered to be closely related to Ardea but for some time it was placed in its own genus—Notophoyx—because of the absence of the plumes typical in that genus. In his review of the family Ardeidae, American ornithologist Walter J. Bock placed the white-faced heron into Ardea, holding it to be related to the white-necked heron, and synonymised Notophoyx. Similarly, Swedish naturalist Kai Curry-Lindahl felt the species was a dwarf member of the genus Ardea. Robert B. Payne and Christopher J. Risley placed the white-faced heron in the genus Egretta due to its skeletal anatomy resembling egrets more than Ardea herons. They noted that Bock had not given reasons why he had placed the species in Ardea, and felt its closest relative was the little blue heron (Egretta caerulea) on account of plumage and skull similarities. Using DNA-DNA hybridization in a 1987 study, Frederick Sheldon confirmed the white-faced heron was a member of the egret clade.

Subspecies E. n. novaehollandiae and E. n. parryi in Australia, E. n. nana from New Caledonia and E. n. austera from Irian Jaya have previously been described, but are now not recognised taxonomically.

Appearance and behaviour are more closely related to those in the genus Egretta.

The Ngarrindjeri people of the Lower Murray region in South Australia knew it as krawli.

== Description ==
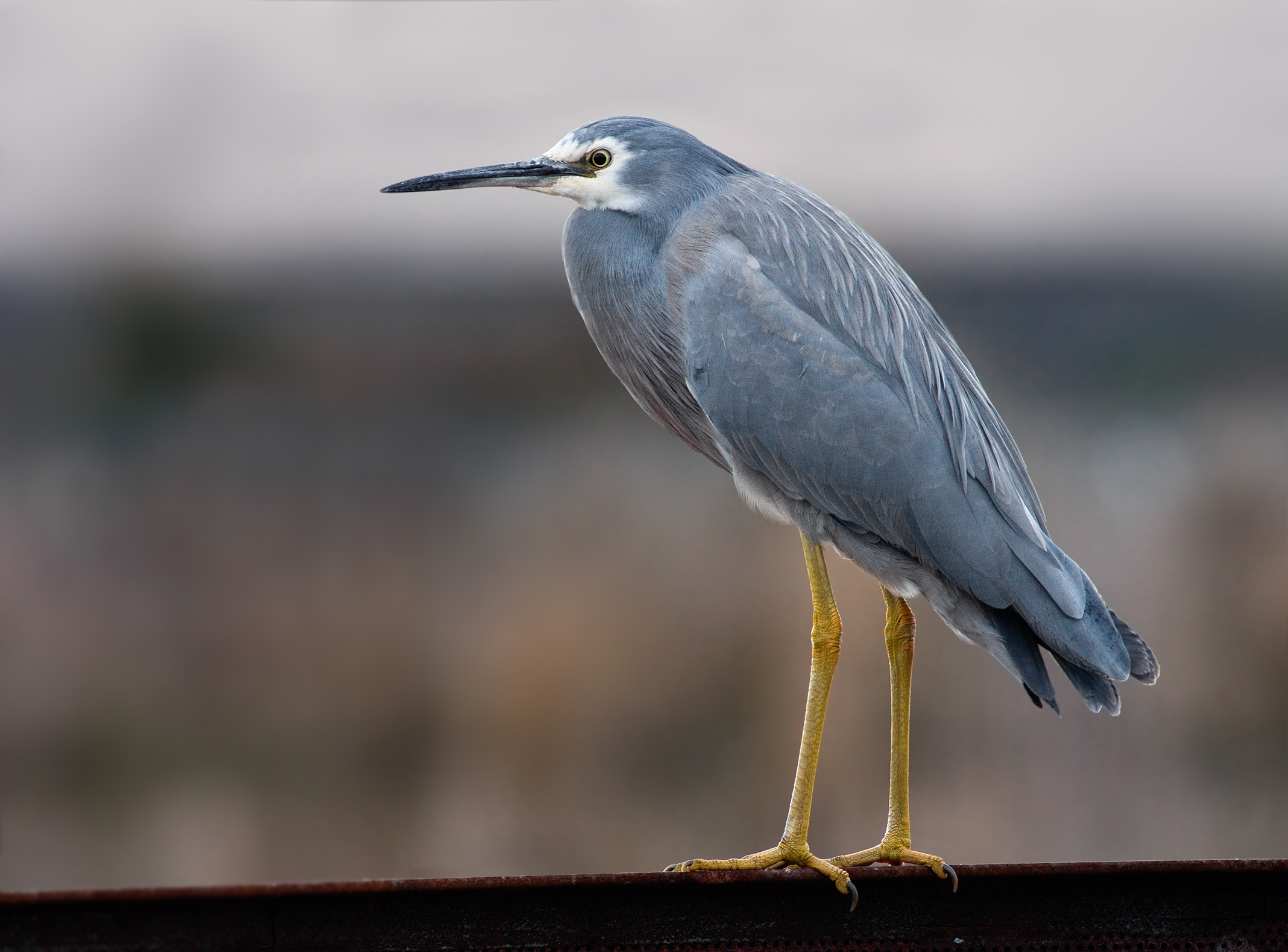
Non-breeding plumage

The adult white-faced heron is medium-sized for the family and mostly pale blue-grey. The forehead, crown, chin and upper throat are white. The crown pattern is variable, with the white occasionally spreading down the neck; the variability makes identification of individuals possible. The iris may be grey, green, dull yellow or cinnamon. The regions between the eye and bill on the side of the head (lores) are black. The beak is black and often pale grey at the base. During the breeding season pinkish-brown or bronze nuptial plumes appear on the foreneck and breast, with blue-grey plumes appearing on the back.

The adult typically weighs 550 g (1.21 lb) and ranges from 60 to 70 cm (24–28 in) in height.

Immature birds are paler grey with only the throat white, and often have a reddish colour on the underparts. Chicks are typically covered with grey down.

== Distribution and habitat ==
The white-faced heron is found throughout most of Australasia, including New Guinea, the islands of Torres Strait, Indonesia, New Caledonia, New Zealand, the islands of the Subantarctic, and all but the driest areas of Australia. The species is now resident on Christmas Island but has not yet been recorded breeding there. It is also commonly found on Lombok, Flores and Sumbawa, and has appeared as a vagrant in China, the Cocos Islands and the Solomon Islands. It is mostly a winter visitor to the Northern Territory. It was self-introduced to New Zealand in the late 1940s. It is the only heron recorded breeding in Tasmania.

The white-faced heron is locally nomadic and found in both fresh and salty wetlands, farm dams, pastures, grasslands, crops, shores, saltmarsh, tidal mudflats, boat-harbours, beaches, golf courses, orchards or in garden fish-ponds. It is protected in Australia under the National Parks and Wildlife Act 1974.

== Behaviour ==
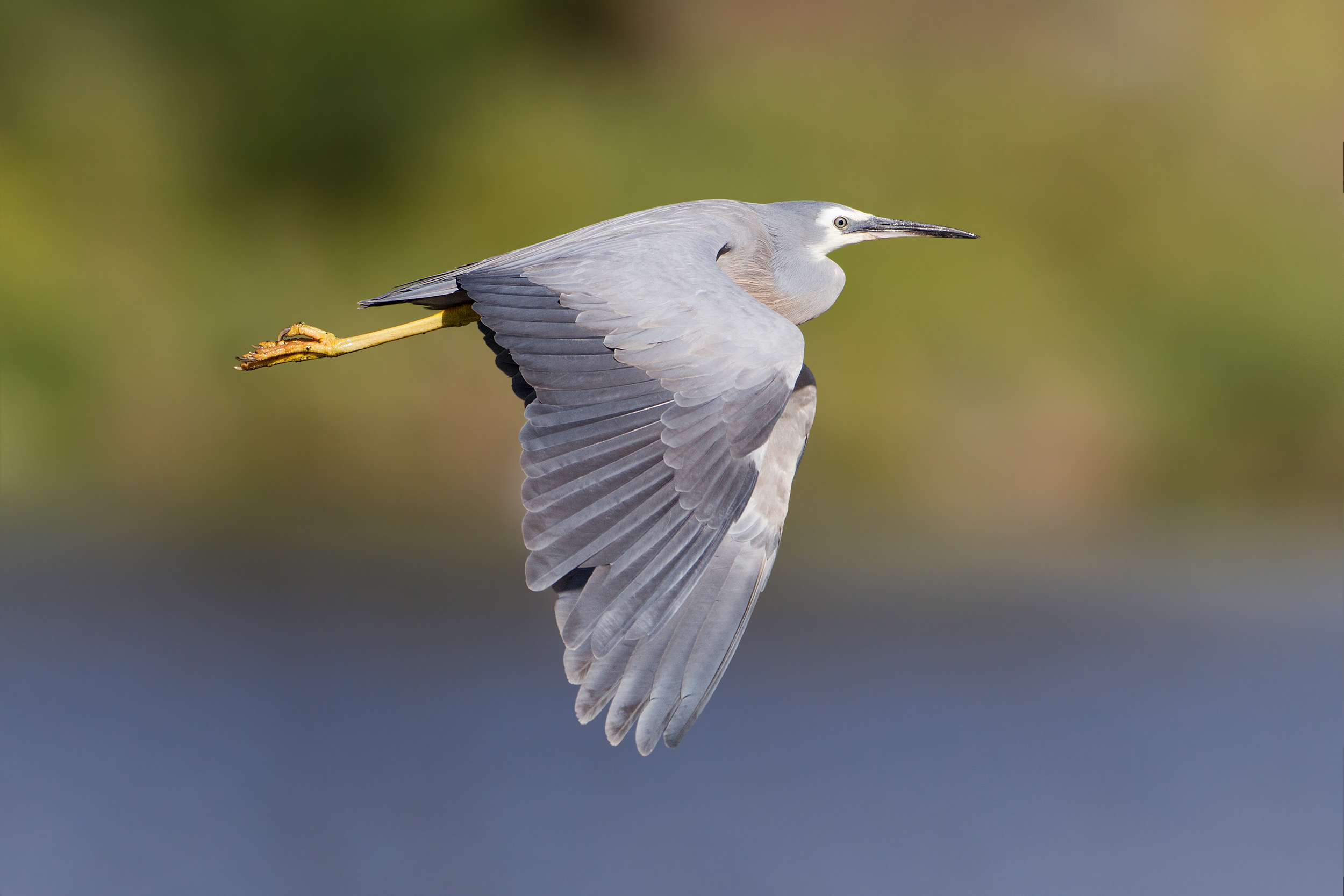
In flight, Tasmania

The white-faced heron typically perches on fence-posts, trees, telephone poles and house roofs. Its flight is slow and bouncing.

=== Call ===
The most common call of the white-faced heron is a gravelly croak or gobble, graak or graaw and is typically given in flight, in interactions or in aggressive encounters. Another call, gow, gow, gow is typically given upon returning to a nest. High pitched wrank, oooooooooh or aaarrrgh calls are given as alarm calls.

=== Breeding ===
Breeding generally takes place in the austral spring, but the birds may breed at other times in response to rainfall. Breeding generally takes place in southern Australia, and birds disperse for long distances at other times of year. Both sexes share the task of building the nest, incubating the eggs and caring for the young. The nest is an untidy shallow bowl, made of sticks and usually placed on a leafy branch 5–12 m high, at altitudes from sea level to over 1000 m. When breeding the birds have long feathers (nuptial plumes) on the neck, head and back. A typical clutch has three to five pale blue eggs. with an average size of 48.5×35 mm. Normally only one brood is raised per year. Incubation lasts approximately 25 days. The parents guard the chicks for 3–4 weeks and fledging takes place 40 days after hatching. Typical nestling predators include kookaburras, Australian magpies, hawks and owls.

=== Feeding ===
White-faced herons eat most small aquatic creatures and their varied diet is fish, frogs, small reptiles and insects. It uses a variety of techniques to find food including standing still and waiting for prey movement (often employing a peculiarly rhythmic neck movement whether in water or on land), walking slowly in shallow water, wing flicking, foot raking or even chasing prey with open wings. White-faced herons generally feed solitarily or independently in small groups. White-faced herons are generally territorial during breeding season but may feed in groups during non-breeding season, particularly after rain or flooding.

== Gallery ==
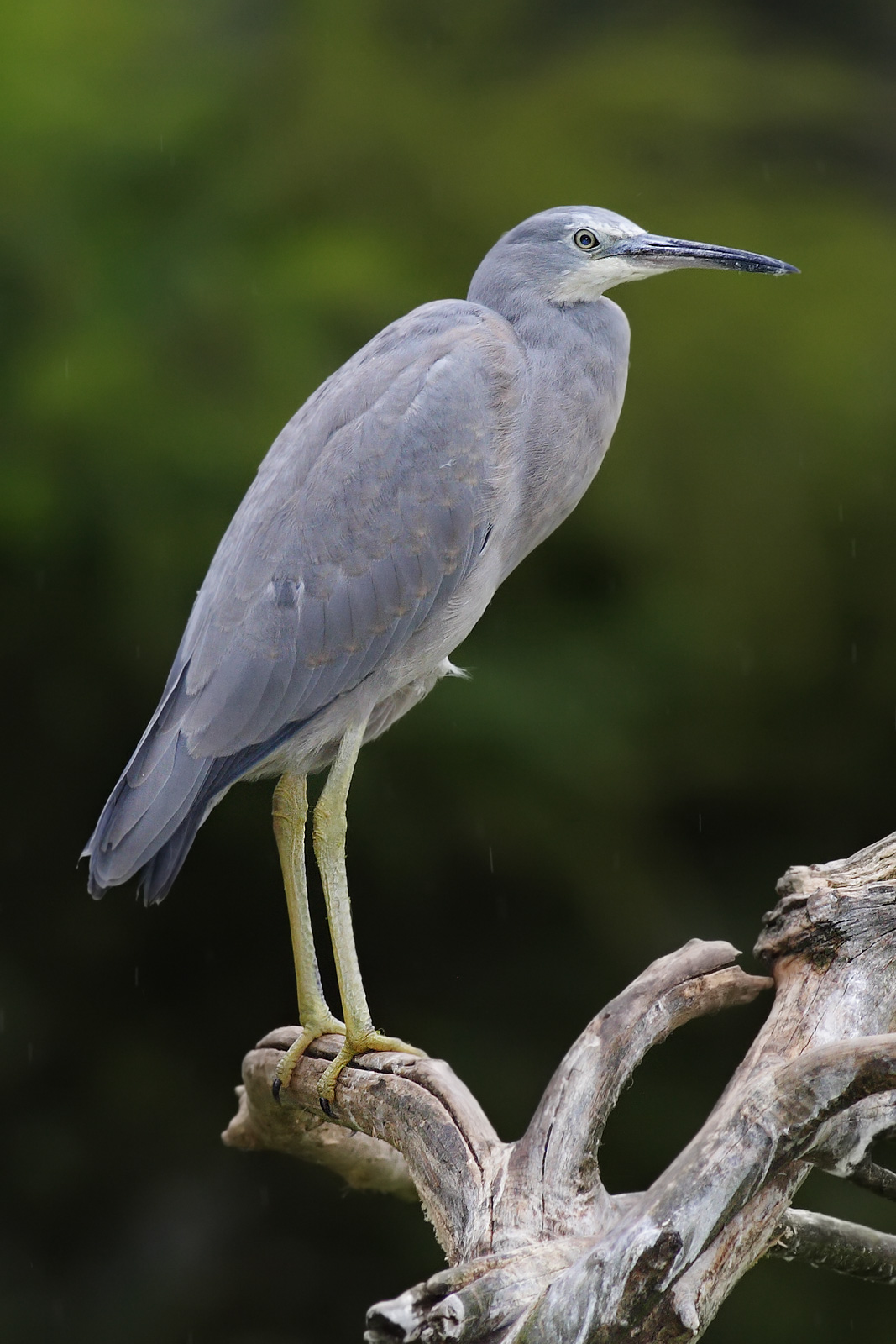
Juvenile plumage

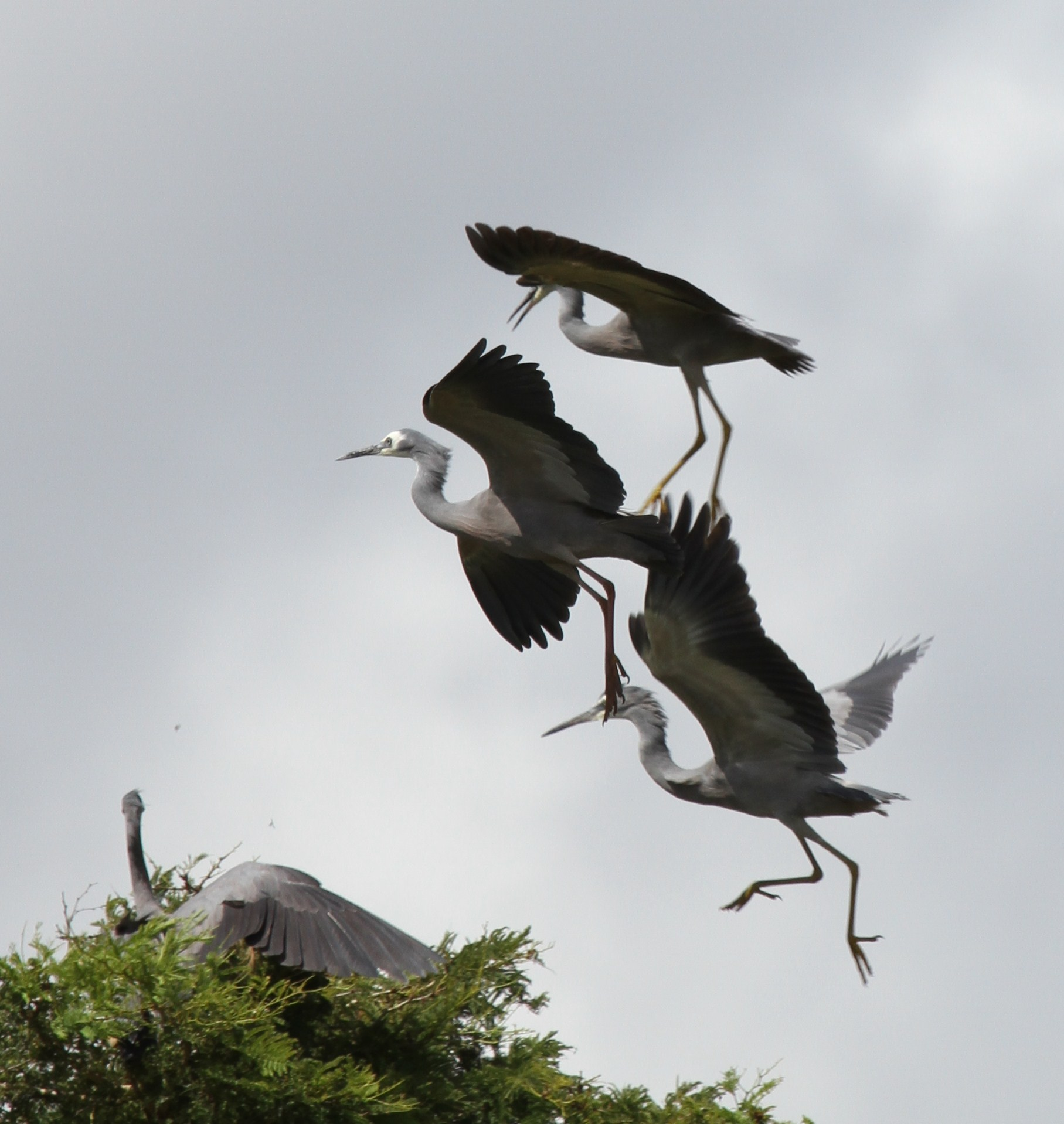
Three white-faced herons squabble as they approach a perch (East Timor)

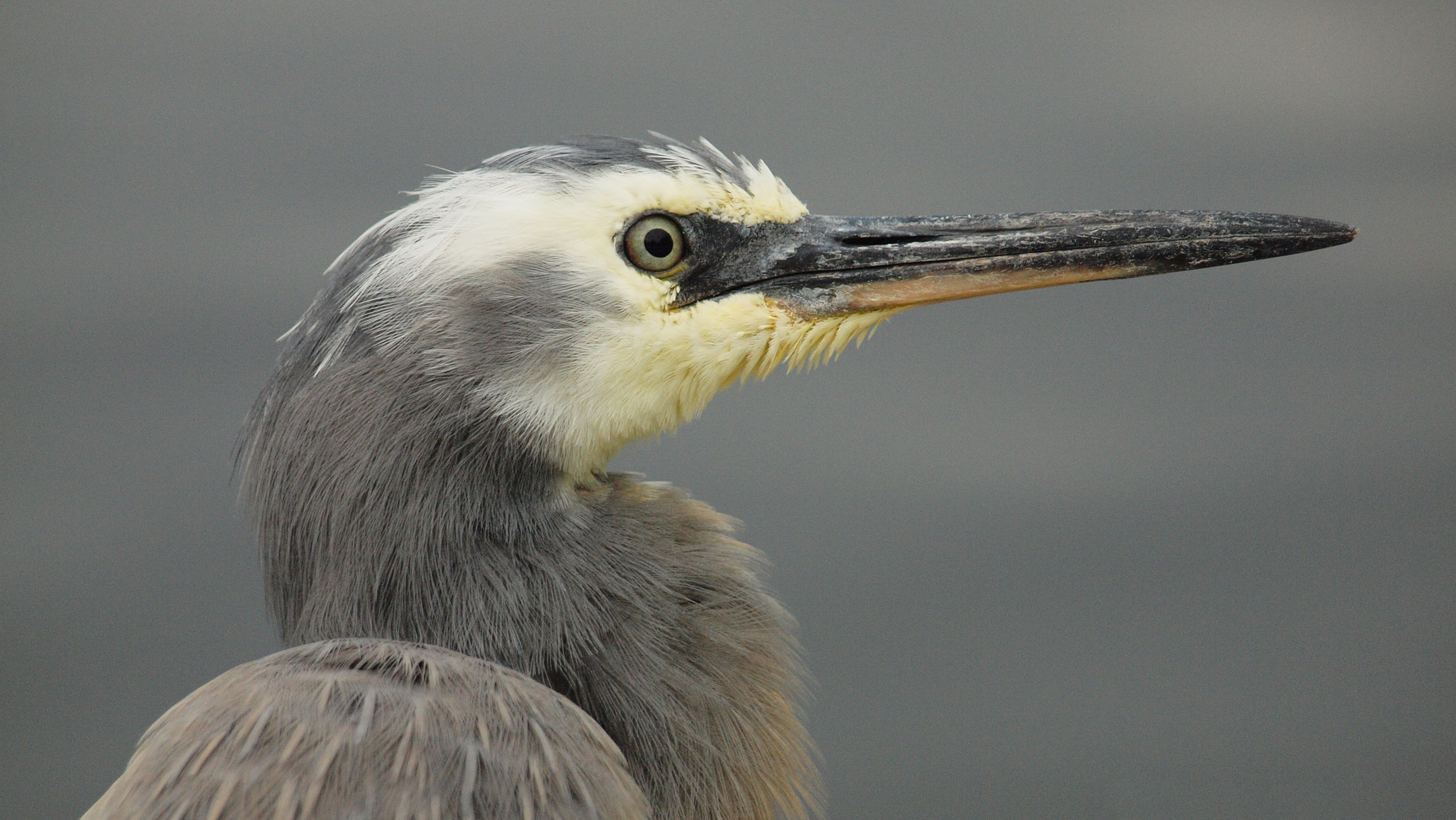
At Royal Botanic Gardens, Sydney, Australia
