= 1989 in Sweden =

- Decades: 1960s; 1970s; 1980s; 1990s; 2000s
- See also: Other events of 1989; Timeline of Swedish history

Events from the year 1989 in Sweden.

== Incumbents ==
- Monarch – Carl XVI Gustaf
- Prime Minister – Ingvar Carlsson

== Events ==
- 1 October – Establishment of the Swedish Security Service
- 22 March, 2 May and 20 December – the Porn Murders occurred in Stockholm

== Popular culture ==
=== Film ===
- 6 March – The 24th Guldbagge Awards were presented.
- 15 September – The Women on the Roof released

=== Sport ===
- 17 to 20 August – The 1989 World Orienteering Championships were held in Skövde.
- 23 September to 1 October – The 1989 Men's European Volleyball Championship was hosted in Örebro and Stockholm.

== Births ==
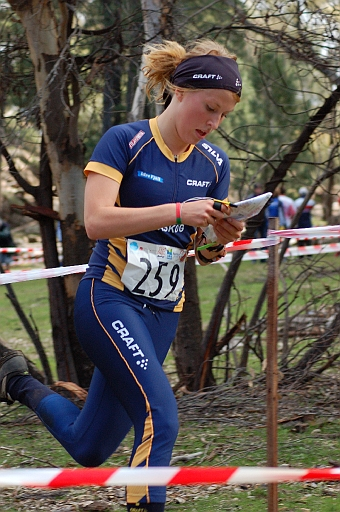
Jenny Lönnkvist

- 22 February – Anna Sundstrand, singer and model
- 28 March – Jenny Lönnkvist, orienteering competitor
- 10 April – Jenny Alm, handball player
- 27 April – Jerker Lysell, orienteering competitor, world champion in sprint (2016)
- 5 May – Agnes Knochenhauer, curler
- 23 May – Jeffery Taylor, basketball player
- 12 June – Emma Eliasson, ice hockey player, Olympic silver medalist
- 29 June – Jens Westin, ice hockey player
- 11 July – Tobias Sana, football player
- 21 July – Christoffer Sundgren, curler
- 8 September – Avicii, DJ, remixer, record producer, musician and songwriter
- 24 October – Felix Arvid Ulf Kjellberg, a.k.a. PewDiePie, YouTube personality
- 4 November – Frida Svedin Thunström, ice hockey player

== Deaths ==
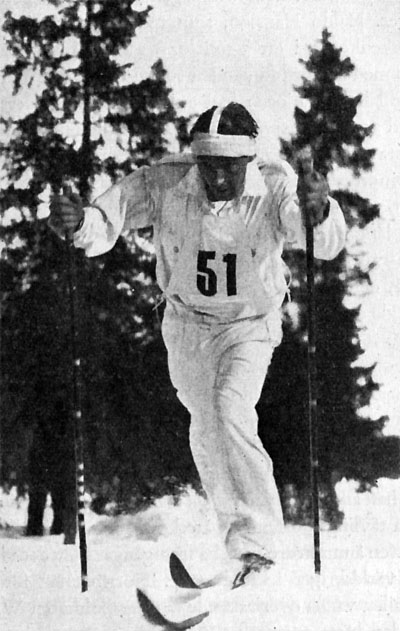
Arthur Häggblad

- 1 February – Erik Persson, footballer (born 1909)
- 27 February – Göran Larsson, swimmer (born 1932)
- 16 June – Arthur Häggblad, cross-country skier (born 1908)
- 20 September – Stig Andersson-Tvilling, ice hockey player (born 1928)
- 29 October – Anders Rydberg, football player (born 1903)
- 23 December – Lennart Strandberg, athlete (born 1915)
- 31 December – Clarence Hammar, sailor (born 1899)
