= 1993 in Sweden =

- Decades: 1970s; 1980s; 1990s; 2000s; 2010s
- See also: Other events of 1993; Timeline of Swedish history

Events from the year 1993 in Sweden

== Incumbents ==
- Monarch – Carl XVI Gustaf
- Prime Minister – Carl Bildt

== Events ==
=== January ===
- 1 January – The Sami Parliament of Sweden established.

=== Undated ===
- Svea Fireworks company is founded.

== Popular culture ==
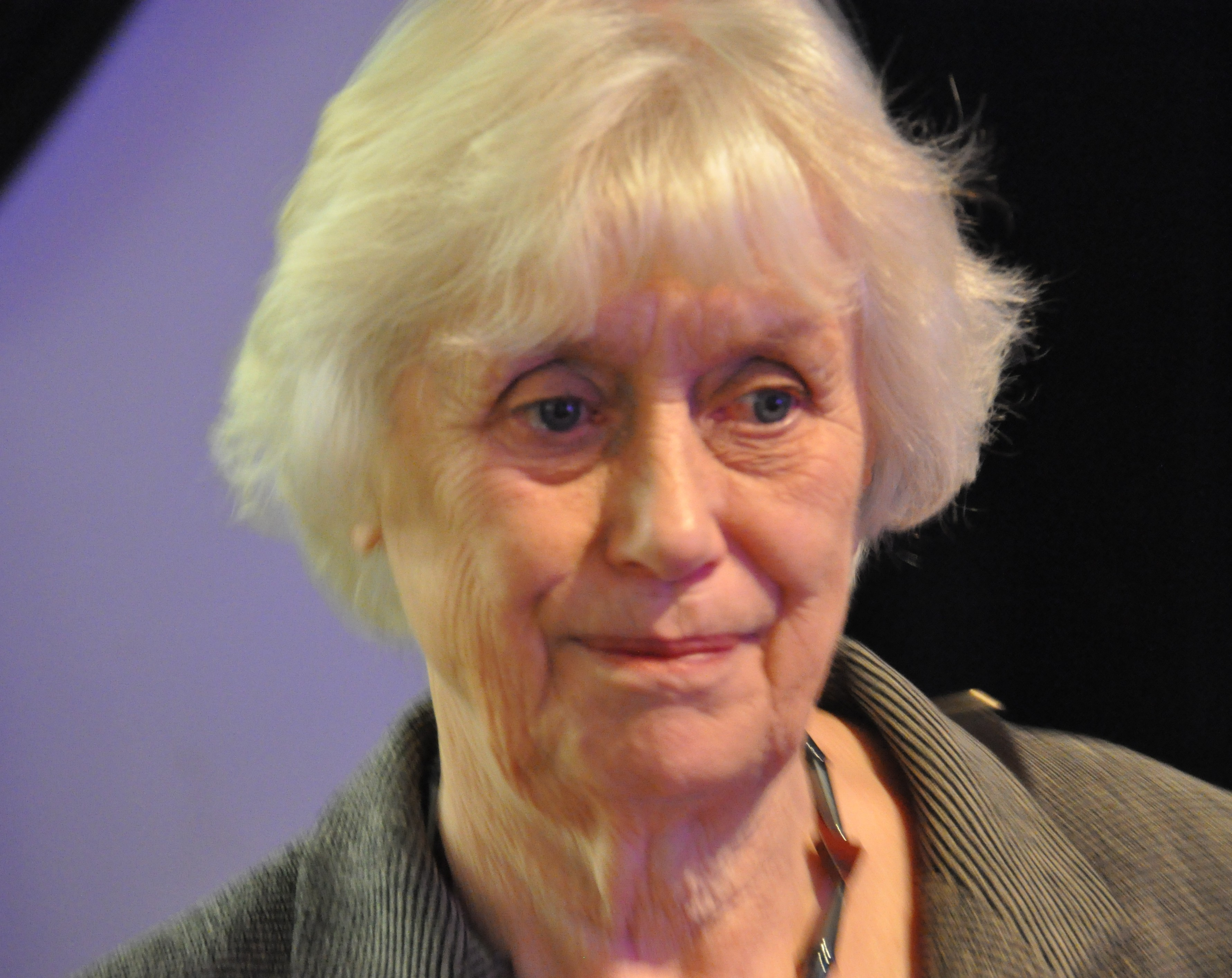
Kerstin Ekman, winner of the August Prize in 1993.

=== Literature ===
- Händelser vid vatten, novel by Kerstin Ekman, winner of the August Prize.

=== Sports ===
- The 1993 Allsvenskan was won by IFK Göteborg

== Births ==
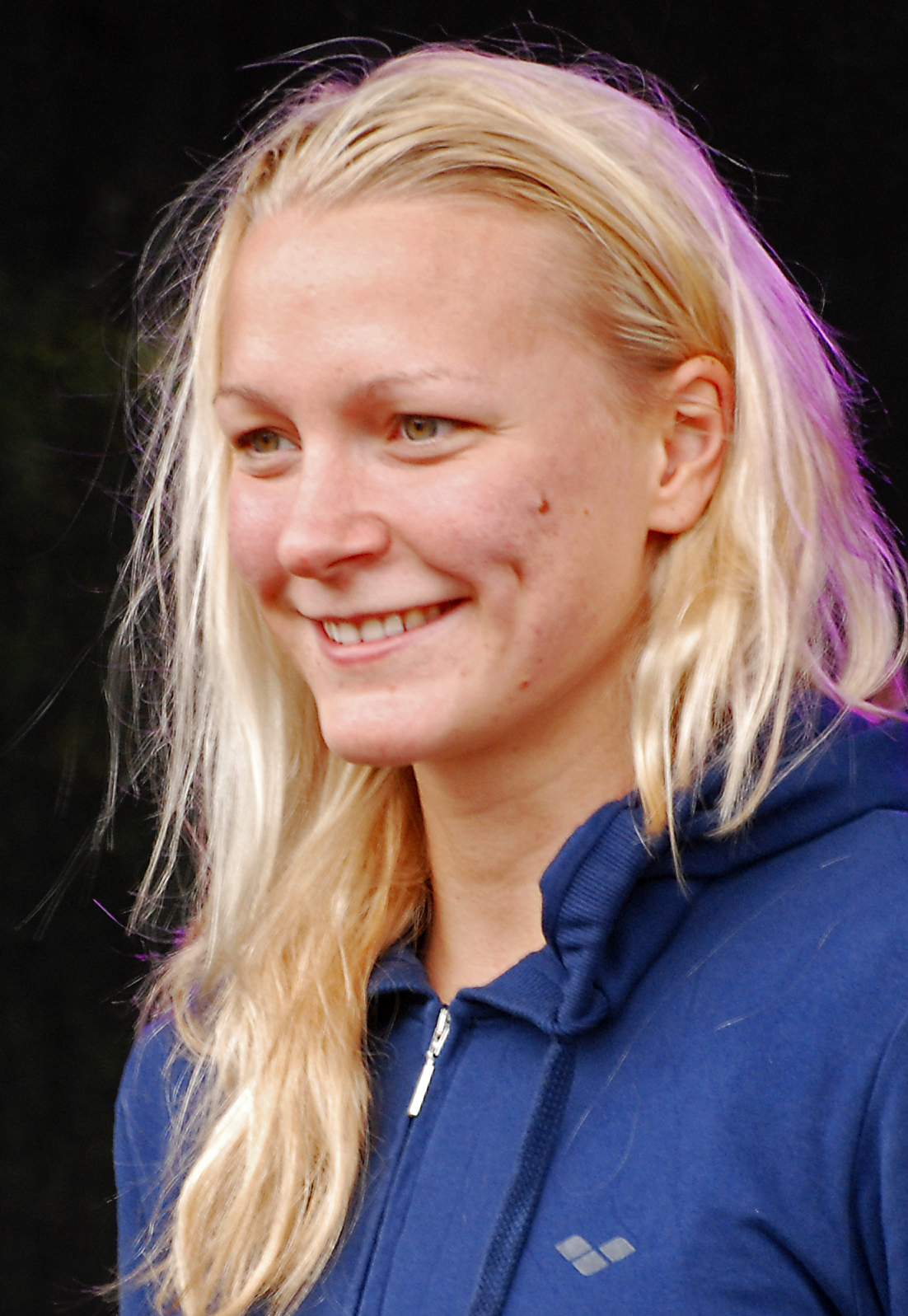
Sarah Sjöström

- 2 January – Jonna Andersson, footballer
- 8 January – William Karlsson, ice hockey player
- 12 January – Branimir Hrgota, footballer
- 17 January – Amanda Ilestedt, footballer
- 7 February – Davor Blažević, footballer
- 26 February – Léon, singer and songwriter
- 1 March – Victor Rask, ice hockey player
- 11 March – Simon Hedlund, footballer
- 28 March – Adam Lindgren, gamer
- 30 March – Louise Mörk, politician
- 31 March – Mikael Ishak, footballer
- 10 April – Sam Larsson, footballer
- 16 April – Hanna Glas, footballer
- 18 April – Mika Zibanejad, ice hockey player
- 22 April – Filip Helander, footballer
- 11 May – Elin Rubensson, footballer
- 19 May – Emil Bergström, footballer
- 3 June – Nils Grandelius, chess grandmaster
- 6 June – Frida Gustavsson, model
- 16 June – Simon Kroon, footballer
- 24 June – Stina Nilsson, cross-country skier
- 26 June – Mahmoud Eid, Footballer
- 8 July – Angelica Bengtsson, pole vaulter
- 12 July – Jonas Brodin, ice hockey player
- 24 July – Andreas Linde, footballer
- 31 July – Linus Ullmark, ice hockey player
- 7 August – Anton Ewald, singer and dancer
- 17 August – Sarah Sjöström swimmer
- 8 September – Magdalena Eriksson, footballer
- 23 September – Pontus Åberg ice hockey player
- 30 September – Ken Sema, footballer
- 9 October – Robin Quaison, footballer
- 12 October – Alexander Jeremejeff, footballer
- 31 October – Michelle Coleman, swimmer
- 22 November – Mattias Rönngren, alpine ski racer.
- 24 November – Fridolina Rolfö, footballer
- 5 December – Marcus Eriksson, basketball player

== Deaths ==
- 1 February – Sven Thofelt, modern pentathlete, Olympic champion 1928 (born 1904).

== See also ==
- 1993 in Swedish television
