= Järvdalen Nature Reserve =

Nature reserve in Jämtland, Sweden

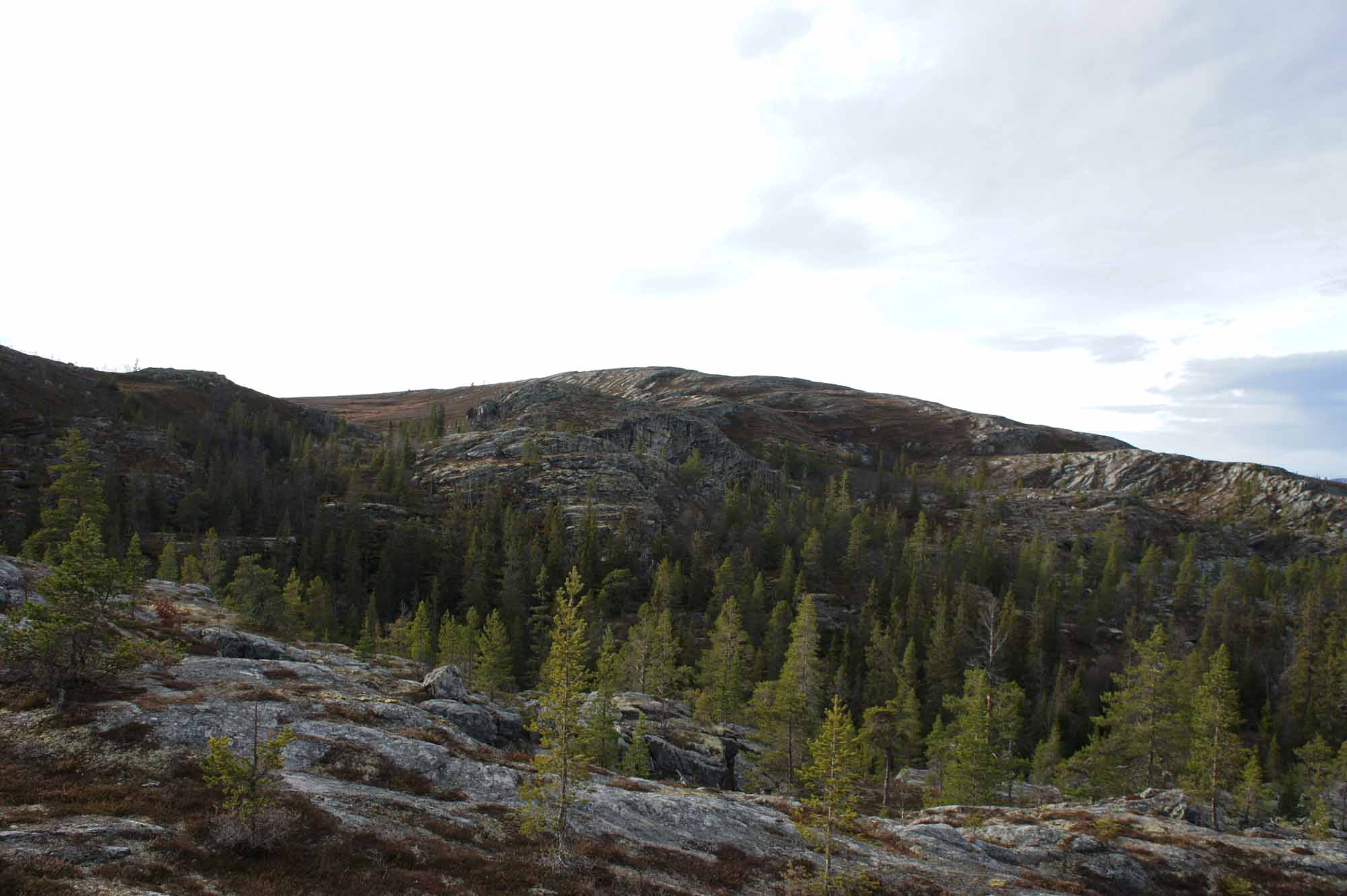

- Location within Jämtland Location within Sweden
- Location: Sweden
- Nearest city: Östersund
- Coordinates: 63°09′25″N 13°36′43″E
- Area: 20 km^{2} (4,900 acres)
- Established: 2005

Järvdalen Nature Reserve (Swedish: Järvdalens naturreservat) is a nature reserve in Jämtland County in Sweden. It is part of the EU-wide Natura 2000-network.

The nature reserve protects an area of old-growth forest, wetlands, lakes and areas of exposed bedrock. Within the nature reserve there are several different kinds of ancient forest, dominated by Scots pine, spruce and birch, respectively. To the west, the nature reserve borders on Vålådalen Nature Reserve.
