= Forsström =

Forsström is a surname. Notable people with the surname include:

- Andreas Forsström (born 1991), Swedish ice hockey player
- Eino Forsström (1889–1961), Finnish gymnast
- Jani Forsström (born 1986), Finnish ice hockey player
- Johan Erik Forsström (1775–1824), Swedish naturalist
- Jonny Forsström (1944–2017), Swedish artist
- Simon Forsström (born 1989), Swedish golfer
- Tua Forsström (born 1947), Finnish writer
