= 1987 in Sweden =

- Decades: 1960s; 1970s; 1980s; 1990s; 2000s
- See also: Other events of 1987; Timeline of Swedish history

Events from the year 1987 in Sweden

== Incumbents ==
- Monarch – Carl XVI Gustaf
- Prime Minister – Ingvar Carlsson

== Events ==
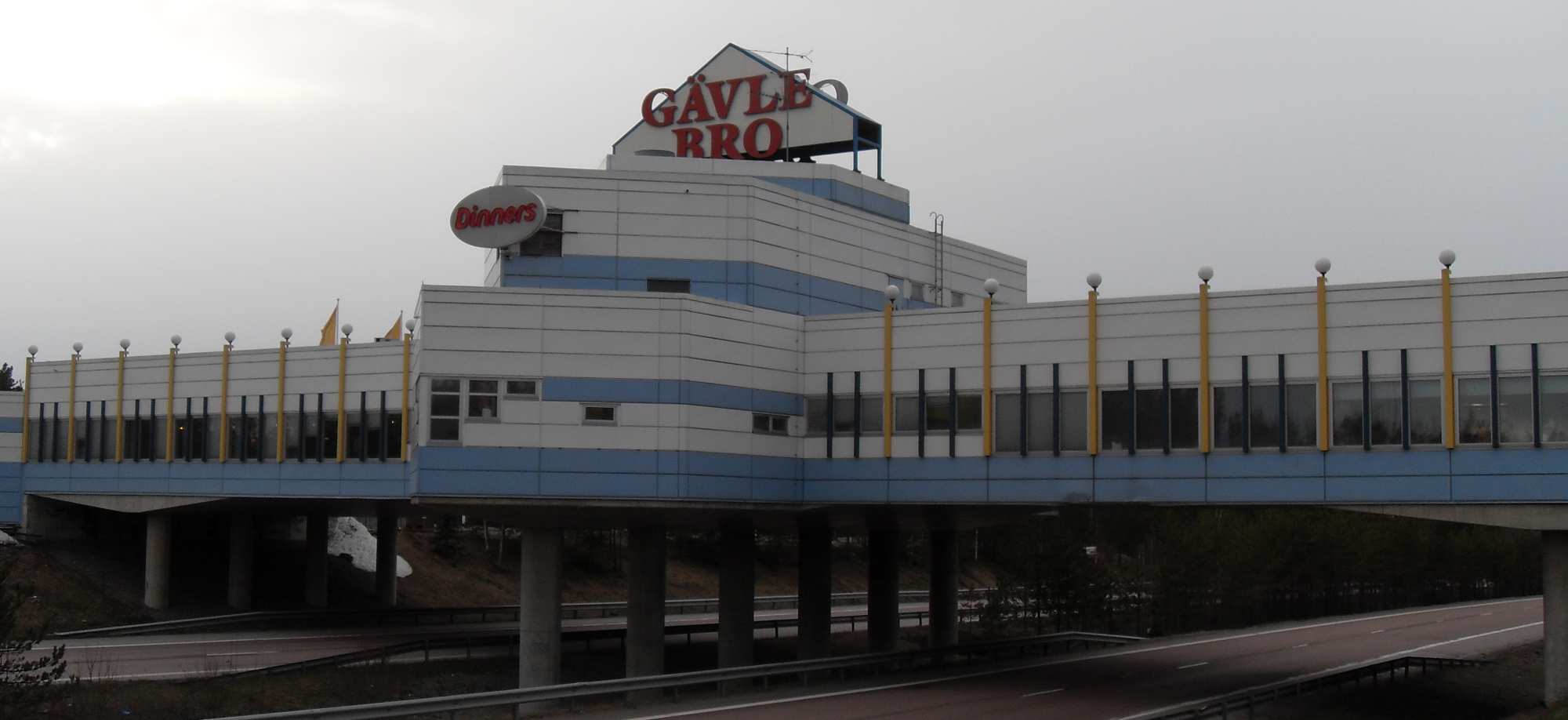
Gävlebro was inaugurated on 15 December.

- 23 January – The film Stockholmsnatt is released.
- 2 February – The 22nd Guldbagge Awards is presented.
- 2 April – Shopping mall A6 center is inaugurated near Jönköping.
- 27 July to 2 August – The tennis tournament 1987 Swedish Open.
- 16 November – In the Lerum train crash, nine people were killed and more than 100 were injured.
- 15 December – Covered bridge restaurant Gävlebro is inaugurated near Gävle.
- 25 December – The film Pelle the Conqueror is released.
- 31 December – TV 3 Sweden is launched.

== Births ==
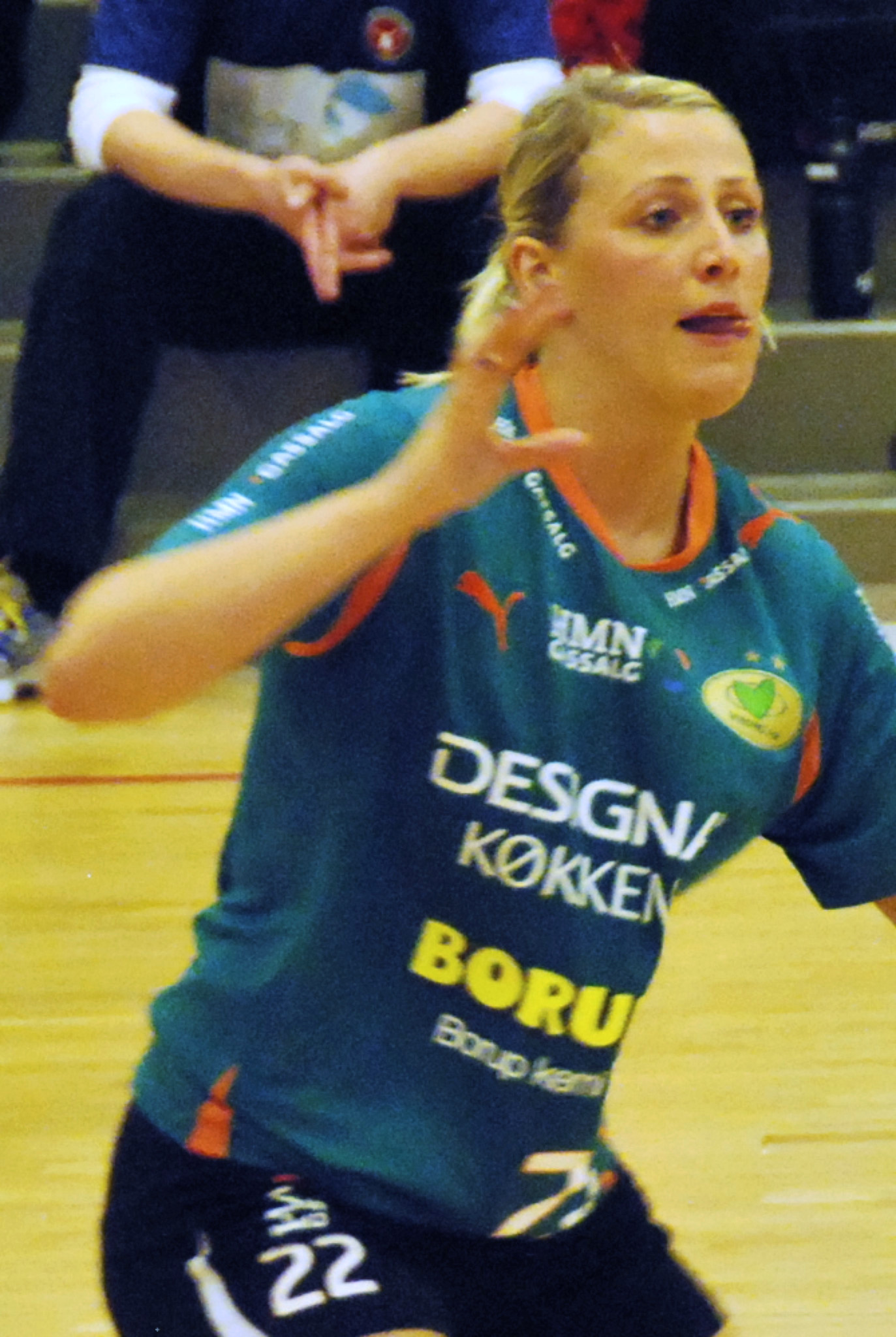
Johanna Ahlm

- 1 January – Patric Hörnqvist, ice hockey player
- 29 January – Christian Carlsson, politician
- 2 February – Christoffer Vikström, swimmer.
- 3 February – Christine Bjerendal, archer.
- 26 February – Johan Sjöstrand, handball player
- 10 March – Ebba Jungmark, high jumper.
- 14 April – Ida Odén, handball player
- 12 May – Björn Gund, ski mountaineer and cross-country skier
- 2 June – Darin Zanyar, singer-songwriter
- 7 July – Veronica Wagner, gymnast
- 27 July – Astrid Gabrielsson, sailor
- 8 August – Petter Menning, sprint canoer
- 2 October – Johanna Ahlm, handball player.
- 29 October – Tove Lo, singer-songwriter
- 14 November – Nour El-Refai, Lebanese born-Swedish actress and comedian
- 17 November – Jacob Wester, freestyle skier
- 12 December – Sibel Redžep, Macedonian-born singer
- Unknown date – Marcus Andersson, politician

== Deaths ==
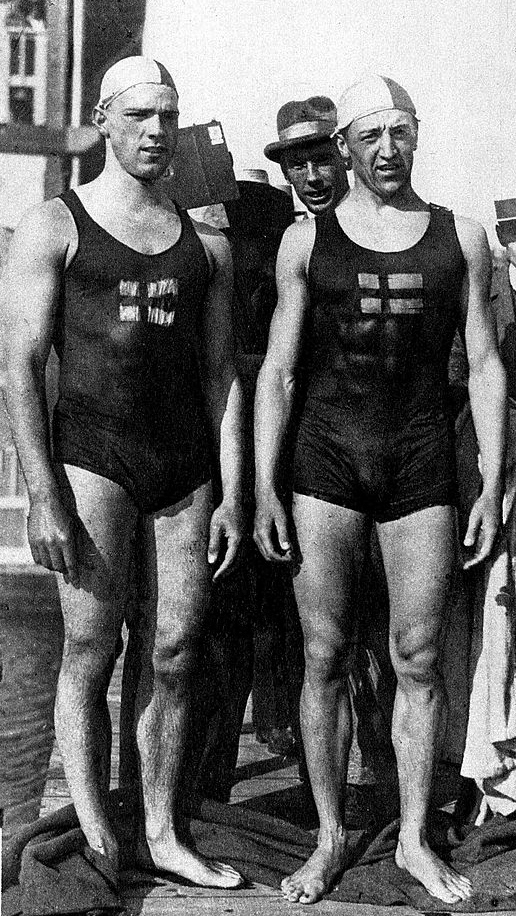
Håkan Malmrot (right), twice Olympic Champion in 1920

- 10 January – Håkan Malmrot, swimmer (born 1900).
- 27 January – Ove Rainer, politician and jurist (born 1925)
- 16 June - John Mikaelsson, Olympic racewalker (born 1913)
- 10 August – Kerstin Gellerman, politician (born 1926)
- 20 October – Lars-Erik Sjöberg, ice-hockey player (born 1944)
- 7 November – Arne Borg, swimmer (born 1901).
- 12 November – Cornelis Vreeswijk, Dutch-Swedish singer-songwriter, actor, and poet (born 1937)
- 21 November – Axel Ståhle, horse rider (born 1891)
