= 1988 in Sweden =

- Decades: 1960s; 1970s; 1980s; 1990s; 2000s
- See also: Other events of 1988; Timeline of Swedish history

Events from the year 1988 in Sweden

== Incumbents ==
- Monarch – Carl XVI Gustaf
- Prime Minister – Ingvar Carlsson

== Events ==
- 1 April – Vålådalen Nature Reserve established
- 18 September – Swedish general election. Ingvar Carlsson remains Prime Minister of Sweden

== Popular culture ==
=== Film ===
- 1 February – The 23rd Guldbagge Awards were presented
- 19 August – Katinka released
- 4 November – Back to Ararat released

=== Sport ===
- 12–14 August – The 1988 Swedish motorcycle Grand Prix

== Births ==
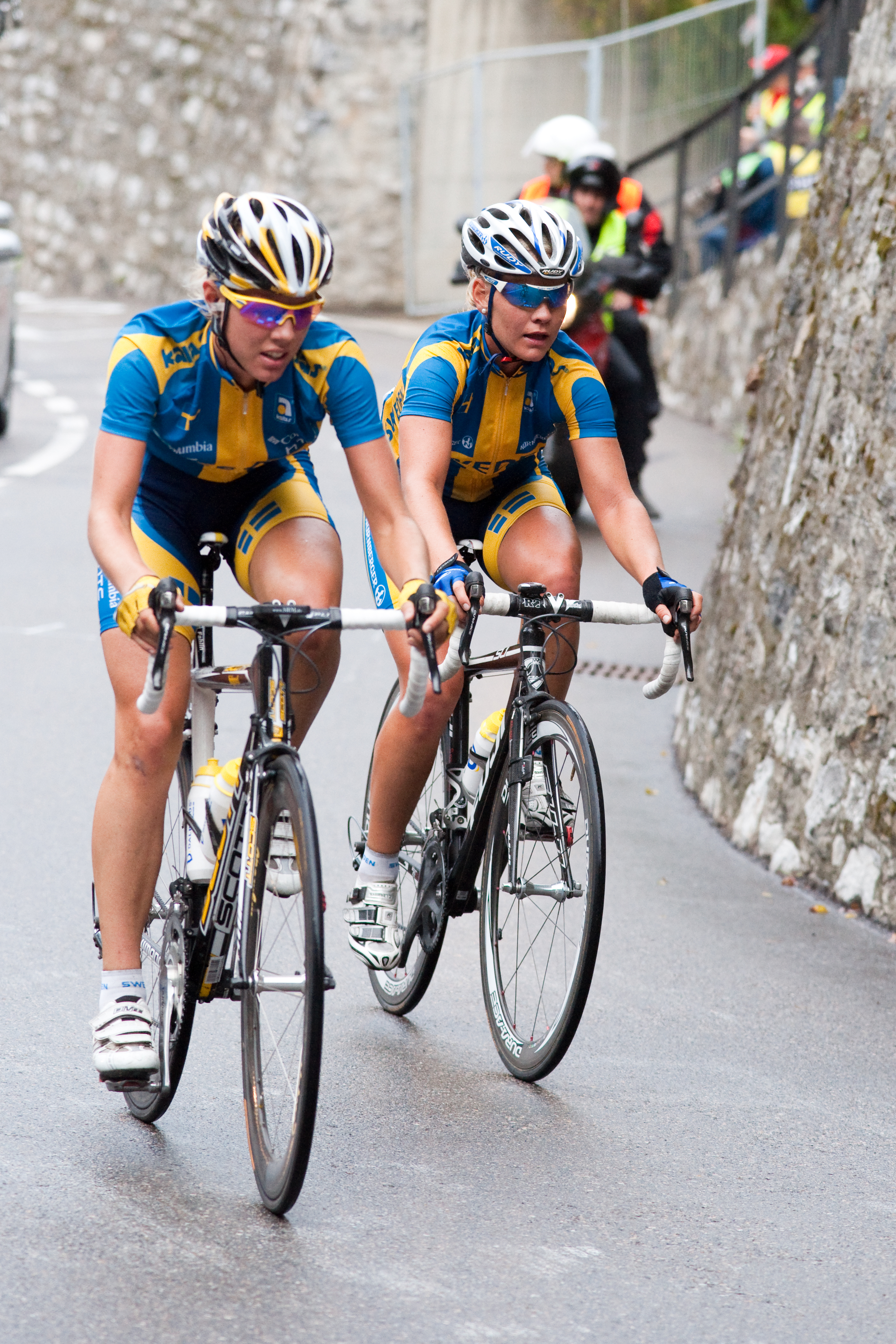
Emilia Fahlin (left)

- 6 March – Agnes Carlsson, singer
- 5 April – Sissela Nordling Blanco, politician
- 7 June – Tobias Arwidson, biathlete
- 15 June – Jennie Johansson, swimmer
- 19 June – Eleonore Lundkvist, politician
- 3 July – Sofia Engström, ice hockey player
- 26 August – Erik Hassle, singer-songwriter
- 22 September – Max Salminen, sailor.
- 24 September – Joline Höstman, swimmer
- 3 October – Alicia Vikander, actress
- 11 October – Camilla Hansson, fashion model
- 17 October – Emma Samuelsson, fencer.
- 24 October – Emilia Fahlin, cyclist
- 7 November – Elsa Hosk, fashion model

== Deaths ==
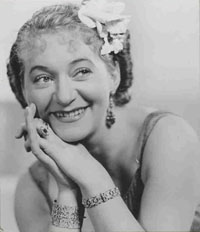
Hjördis Petterson

- 7 March – Olof Stahre, horse rider, Olympic champion (born 1909).
- 15 March – Thord Flodqvist, ice hockey player (born 1926).
- 29 March – Thage Brauer, high jumper (born 1894)
- 5 April – Alf Kjellin, film actor and director (born 1920)
- 23 April – Axel Grönberg, wrestler (born 1918)
- 24 May – Gustav Åkerman, Swedish army officer (born 1901)
- 27 May – Hjördis Petterson, actress (born 1908)
- 15 July – Tore Keller, football player (born 1905)
