= 1992 in Swedish television =

This is a list of Swedish television related events from 1992.

== Events ==
- 9 May - The 37th Eurovision Song Contest is held at the Malmö Isstadion in Malmö. Ireland wins the contest with the song "Why Me?", performed by Linda Martin.

== Debuts ==
=== Domestic ===
- 2 December - K-T.V. (1992-1997) (Filmnet)

== Television shows ==
- 29 November-24 December - Klasses julkalender

== Networks and services ==
=== Launches ===
Network	Type	Launch date	Notes	Source
ZTV	Cable television	1 May		

== See also ==
- 1992 in Sweden
