= 1991 in Swedish television =

This is a list of Swedish television related events from 1991.

== Events ==
- 4 May - Sweden wins the 36th Eurovision Song Contest in Rome, Italy. The winning song is "Fångad av en stormvind", performed by Carola.

== Television shows ==
- 1–24 December - Sunes jul

== See also ==
- 1991 in Sweden
