= 1992 in Sweden =

- Decades: 1970s; 1980s; 1990s; 2000s; 2010s
- See also: Other events of 1992; Timeline of Swedish history

Events from the year 1992 in Sweden.

== Incumbents ==
- Monarch – Carl XVI Gustaf
- Prime Minister – Carl Bildt

== Events ==
- The French School in Gothenburg was founded in Gothenburg.

== Popular culture ==
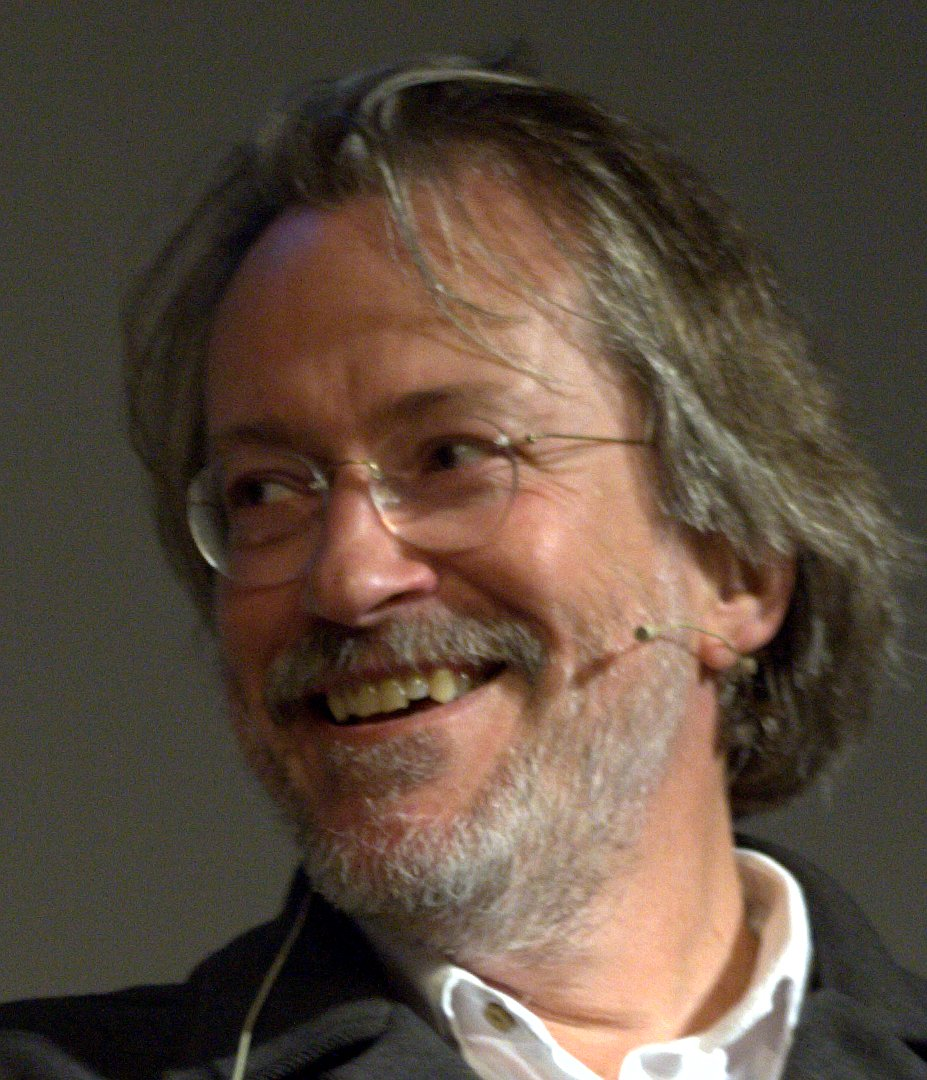
Niklas Rådström, winner of the August Prize

=== Literature ===
- Medan tiden tänker på annat, novel by Niklas Rådström, winner of the August Prize.

=== Film ===
- 26 September – Lotta på Bråkmakargatan was released in Sweden. The film was based on books by Astrid Lindgren, and was directed by Johanna Hald.

=== Sports ===
- In 1992, Sweden hosted the UEFA European Football Championship, where Denmark clinched the title, marking a significant achievement in their football history. Additionally, Sweden participated in the Summer Olympics in Barcelona, sending a team of 187 athletes across 22 sports.

== Births ==
- 2 January – Viktor Claesson, footballer
- 8 January – Patrik Carlgren, football goalkeeper
- 19 January – Nicklas Bärkroth, footballer
- 23 January – Serge-Junior Martinsson Ngouali, Swedish-Gabonese footballer
- 30 January – Alexander Milošević, footballer
- 30 January – Jessica Wik, footballer
- 31 January – Victor Crone, singer and guitarist
- 16 February – Mattias Johansson, footballer
- 16 February – Julia Roddar, footballer
- 25 February – Joakim Nordström, ice hockey player
- 9 March – Cornelia Jakobs, singer
- 14 March – Erik Gustafsson, ice hockey player
- 24 March – Peppe Femling, biathlete
- 14 April – Oliver Bohm, ice hockey player
- 15 April – Amy Deasismont, singer
- 15 April – John Guidetti, footballer
- 29 April – Sebastian Holmén, footballer
- 18 May – John Persson, ice hockey player
- 21 May – Timmy Hansen, racing driver
- 7 June – Abdul Khalili, footballer
- 24 June – Isaac Kiese Thelin, footballer
- 28 June – Oscar Hiljemark, footballer
- 3 July – Molly Sandén, singer.
- 6 July – Beata Kollmats, footballer
- 14 July – Oscar Lewicki, footballer
- 27 August – Daniel Ståhl, discus thrower
- 31 August – Kim Magnusson, cyclist
- 12 November – Adam Larsson, ice hockey player
- 14 November – Alexander Michel Melki, football player
- 23 November – Gabriel Landeskog, ice hockey player
- Unknown date – Marcus Fridlund, politician

== Deaths ==
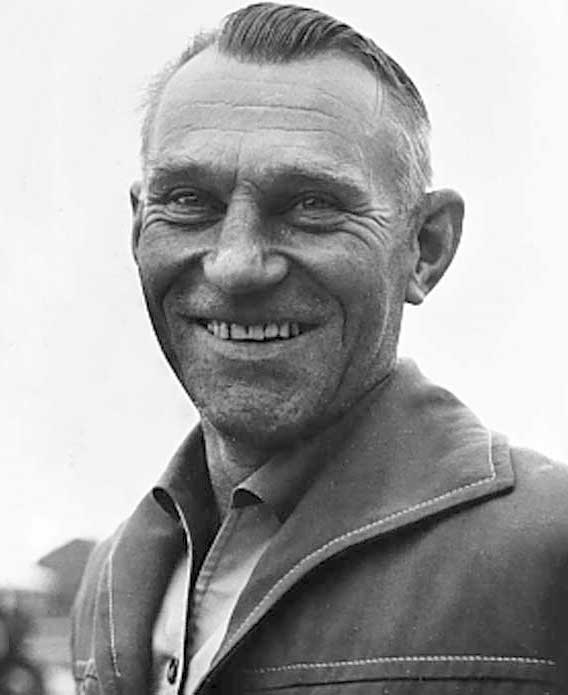
Hjalmar Karlsson

- 16 January – Carl-Gustaf Lindstedt, actor
- 28 January – Arvid Andersson-Holtman, gymnast (born 1896).
- 3 February – Knut Fridell, wrestler (born 1908).
- 4 February – Lisa Fonssagrives, model (born 1911)
- 2 April – Hjalmar Karlsson, sailor (born 1906).
- 30 July – Bo Lindman, modern pentathlete (born 1899).
- 9 October – Per Olof Sundman, writer and politician (born 1922)
- 9 November – Sven Selånger, skier (born 1907)
- 15 December – Sven Delblanc, writer (born 1931)

== See also ==
- 1992 in Swedish television
