= 1993 in Swedish television =

This is a list of Swedish television related events from 1993.

== Events ==
- 14 January - British children's animated series Postman Pat begins its very first airing in Sweden on TV4.

== Debuts ==
=== Domestic ===
- 16 November - Morsarvet (1993) (STV)
- 1 December - Tomtemaskinen (1993) (SVT1)

=== International ===
- 14 January - (United Kingdom) Postman Pat (1981, 1991–1992, 1995, 1997, 2004-2008) (TV4)
- 3 September - (United States) Darkwing Duck (1991-1992) (STV)
- (Netherlands) The Bluffers (1986) (TV4)

== Networks and services ==
=== Launches ===
Network	Type	Launch date	Notes	Source
K-T.V.	Cable television	Unknown		
Cartoon Network	Cable television	17 September		
Turner Classic Movies	Cable television	17 September		

=== Conversions and rebrandings ===
Old network name	New network name	Type	Conversion Date	Notes	Source
Discovery Travel & Living	TLC	2 December	Cable television		

=== Closures ===
Network	Type	End date	Notes	Sources
ZTV	Cable television	1 August		

== Deaths ==
Date	Name	Age	Cinematic Credibility
15 March	Lennart Hyland	73	Swedish TV host & journalist

== See also ==
- 1993 in Sweden
