= Gävlebro =

Coordinates: 60.6489°N 17.1189°E

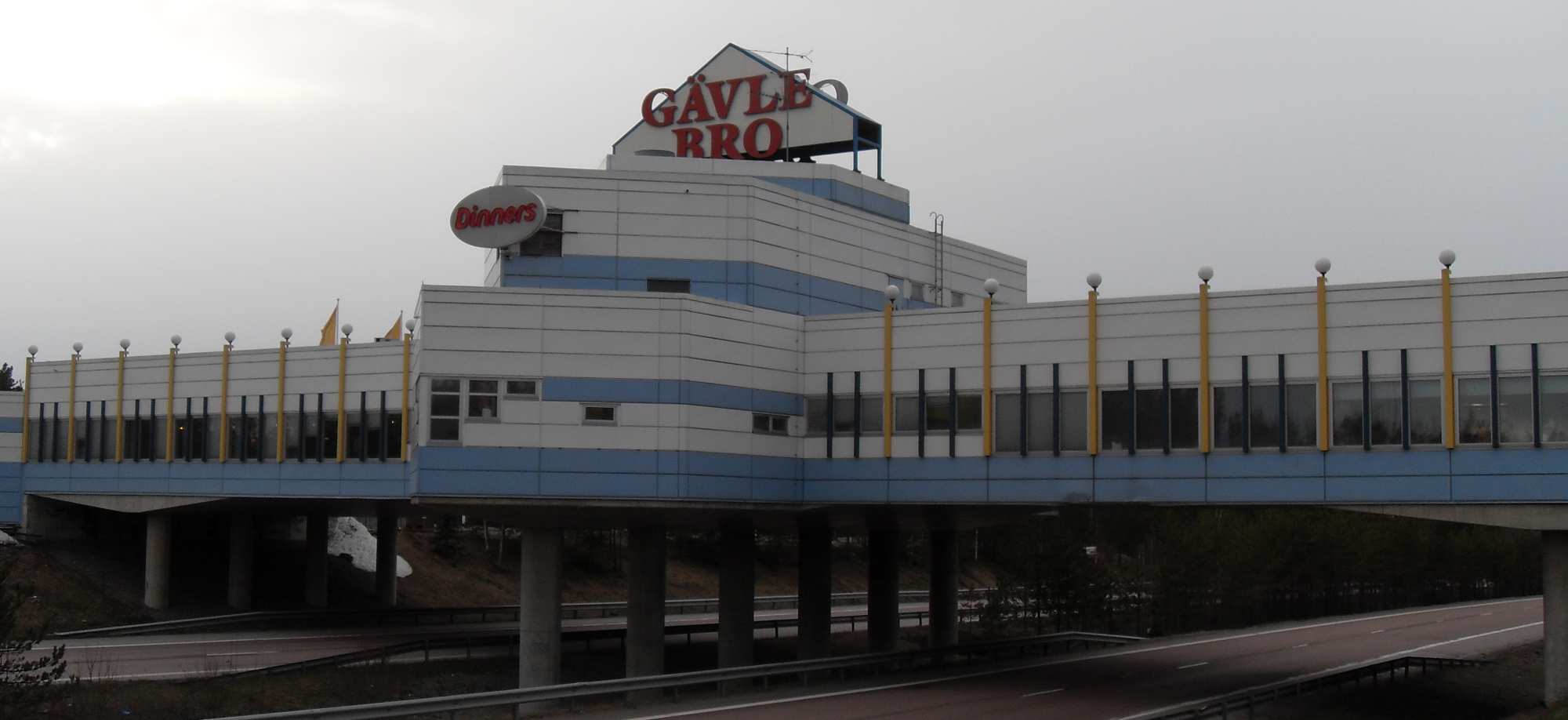
Gävlebro in April 2010

Gävlebro is a rest area with a restaurant, located near the E4 motorway outside Gävle in Sweden. Inaugurated on 15 December 1987, the facility is built as a covered bridge restaurant. The structure is notable for being the only visible landmark the city of Gävle has on the E4 motorway, one of the most heavily congested roads, connecting Norrland with southern Sweden.
