= Porn Murders =

1989 murders in Stockholm, Sweden

- Location of the three murders
- Location: 1st murder: 59°23′28″N 17°53′59″E; 2nd murder: 59°21′01″N 18°03′28″E; 3rd murder: 59°19′07″N 18°02′53″E; Stockholm, Sweden
- Date: 22 March 1989– 2 December 1989
- Target: Porn shop clerks
- Attack type: Stabbing
- Weapon: Knife
- Deaths: 3
- Victims: 3
- Motive: Unclear motive, possible anti-porn sentiment

The Porn Murders (Swedish: Porrmorden) refers to three unsolved murders in Stockholm in 1989 where the connection was that all three worked at porn video stores. The victims—Rajandran "Chris" Chinakaruppan, Francisc Kiraly, and Mats Engström—were attacked in or near the adult stores where they worked. The murders occurred between March and December and were characterized by the absence of robbery or clear motives. Chinakaruppan was found stabbed outside his home after closing a sex shop, Kiraly was killed inside the XXX Rated store while customers were present, and Engström was stabbed while closing Lunda Video late at night. Despite thorough investigations, no suspect was identified, and the case remains unsolved.

The killings raised concerns within the adult industry, prompting police to issue safety recommendations. Authorities considered that the perpetrator may have held strong negative views toward pornography, possibly influenced by religious motives, as the murders coincided with major holidays. The discovery of illegal material at one of the victim's workplaces added complexity to the case. Over time, the "Porn Murders" have remained one of Stockholm's most notable unsolved criminal cases, drawing ongoing media attention and public interest.

== 22 March: first murder ==
=== Murder ===
On 22 March 1989, 35-year-old Rajandran "Chris" Chinakaruppan (born 16 May 1953, in Malaysia) was murdered at Faringeplan in Tensta, a district in the Spånga-Tensta borough in western Stockholm. Chinakaruppan had moved to Sweden from Malaysia in 1975 and married a Swedish woman. He worked at the register (Note: One source says he worked at the cash register and another that he was the owner of the store.) in the Soho sex shop on Birger Jarlsgatan in central Stockholm.

Around midnight on Tuesday, 21 March, he closed the shop, got into his red Golf GTI, and drove home to Faringeplan. Sometime between 12:20 and 12:35 a.m., while adjusting the engine of his car in the parking lot outside his home, he was stabbed. Two people in nearby apartments spotted his lifeless body and alerted the police.

=== Investigation ===
When officers arrived, they found the car still idling with the driver's door open. The hood was unlatched but not fully raised. He was not carrying the shop's cash, and his wallet was still at the scene. A screwdriver was found nearby, suggesting he had been working on the car when he was attacked. After being stabbed, he had apparently crawled or dragged himself around 50 meters before succumbing to his injuries. He had no prior criminal record and was unknown to police.

One of Chinakaruppan's neighbors – a Pakistani man around the same age – had recently drawn attention after publicly expressing support for Salman Rushdie. A month earlier, he had announced in the press that he planned to translate the controversial The Satanic Verses into Urdu, the language of his former homeland. He had since received death threats by phone. Police conducted door-to-door inquiries in the area, but these yielded no useful leads.

A search of Chinakaruppan's workplace in central Stockholm turned up no clear motive for the murder. However, police did find a box containing child pornography dating from the 1960s and 1970s. The store's management claimed it was not intended for sale. The person ultimately responsible for the business was a 50-year-old man living in West Germany. Together with the shop's CEO and board chair – a 37-year-old Swedish woman – he was already facing charges for distributing videos depicting sexual sadism. Now, both also became suspects in connection with the child pornography found at the shop. During the preliminary investigation, the woman, who worked as a nursing assistant in the Stockholm area, stated that she was only CEO and board chair "on paper" for the limited company that owned the store. In reality, the business was run by the West German man and his wife.

During an earlier raid on the store in April 1987, police had discovered 20 extreme violence videos. At that time, it was Chinakaruppan who had been working behind the counter and showed police around the premises. In early May 1989, a trial began against the West German man and the woman for distributing video recordings containing prolonged, sexually explicit violence. According to the Swedish National Board of Film Classification (Statens biografbyrå), which initiated the charges, the videos featured highly realistic scenes in which women were tortured using, among other things, nails and needles.

== 2 May: second murder ==
=== Murder ===
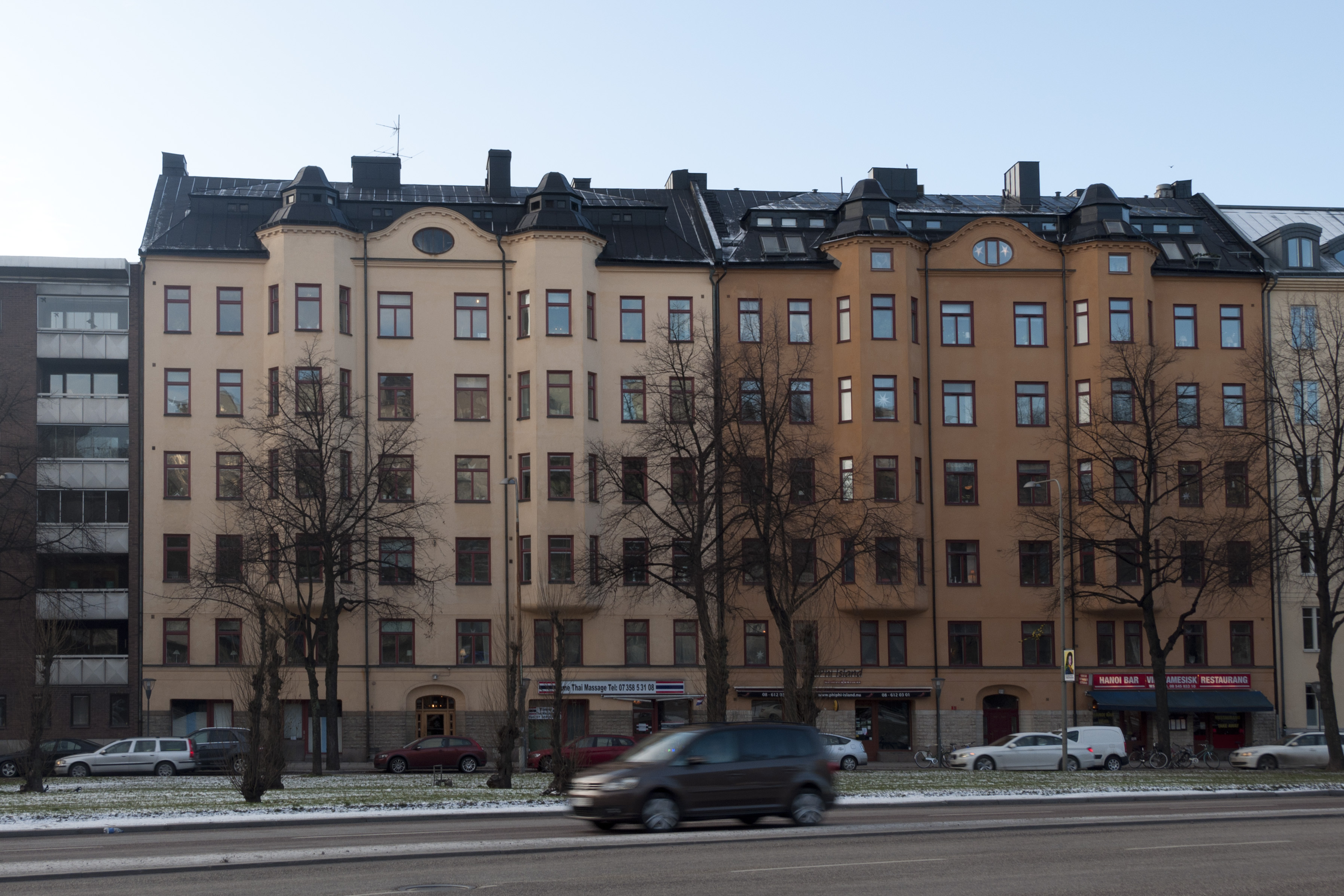
Birger Jarlsgatan 121 where the murder was committed

On 2 May 1989, 47-year-old Francisc Kiraly (born 1 April 1942, in Romania) was murdered inside the adult store XXX Rated on Birger Jarlsgatan 121, located in the Sibirien neighborhood of the Vasastan district in central Stockholm.

Kiraly, a school janitor by profession, was working extra shifts at the porn shop when he was attacked around 2:00 a.m. on the night of 2 May. At the time, there were two or three customers in the store. Two of them were sitting in private booths watching pornographic films. They heard the shop assistant (Kiraly) cry out for help but were too afraid to leave. It wasn't until 15 minutes later that the first man stepped out of his booth; the second came out an hour later—only when police were outside knocking on the door. By then, a taxi driver—who had been called over by staff from a nearby fast food kiosk—had entered the shop, found Kiraly lying in a pool of blood on the floor, and called the police. Kiraly had sustained multiple stab wounds to the chest.

=== Investigation ===
Police explored several possible motives, including revenge by a fanatical opponent of pornography, or financial reasons. However, they did not believe it was a straightforward robbery-murder. Instead, they suspected Kiraly may have been killed by mistake, with the perpetrator possibly targeting the wrong person. Kiraly had only worked at the shop three times before. The owner of the store had emptied the cash register just a few hours earlier. Behind the porn shop, there was also a business involved in the production of adult films. In addition to running the store, the owner operated a studio in Stockholm where so-called "amateur" films were recorded, as well as a larger venue in Hammarbyhamnen that screened all types of pornographic videos around the clock. Shortly before the murder, a men's magazine had published an exposé about the film production side of the business. The article named the companies and individuals involved—using first names only—and described their operations, though no photos were published.

== 20 December: third murder ==
=== Murder ===
On 20 December 1989, 28-year-old Mats Engström (born 13 May 1961) was murdered at Lunda Video, an adult store located at Lundagatan 31 in the Södermalm district of central Stockholm. Engström was killed while closing up the shop for the night. An anonymous man called the police and reported that the clerk at the porn store had been murdered. Toward the back of the store, there was a viewing room where customers could watch films. It's believed that the caller was a customer who had been in one of the booths and discovered the murder on his way out as the store was closing. Engström had been stabbed multiple times and collapsed behind the counter.

=== Investigation ===
Initially, police had no leads on the killer. The first patrol to arrive found the store completely deserted. The door had been pushed shut, but not locked. In the days following the murder, reports confirmed that police still had no solid leads. About half a dozen detectives were assigned to the case. A witness had reportedly seen a light-colored Volvo 145 near the scene.

Engström, who had worked at Lunda Video for three years, appeared to have been taken by surprise, as there were no signs of a struggle. The killer had shown no interest in stealing anything – Engström's wallet was untouched, and all the money in the cash register was still there. Police began reviewing the store's customer records. Those who rented adult films to take home were registered by name. However, the problem was that customers who rented booths to watch films on site were not tracked in any way – making it impossible to identify them.

== Ongoing investigations and related incidents ==
The Stockholm Police Department's Violent Crimes Division handled the murder investigations. From the outset, police suspected that the perpetrator harbored an irrational hatred toward the pornography industry. Footprints were secured from two of the crime scenes. Forensic analysis showed that the suspected killer had been wearing Nike Air Windrunner sneakers, size 43, during at least one of the murders.

=== Murder of Philippe Alberi ===
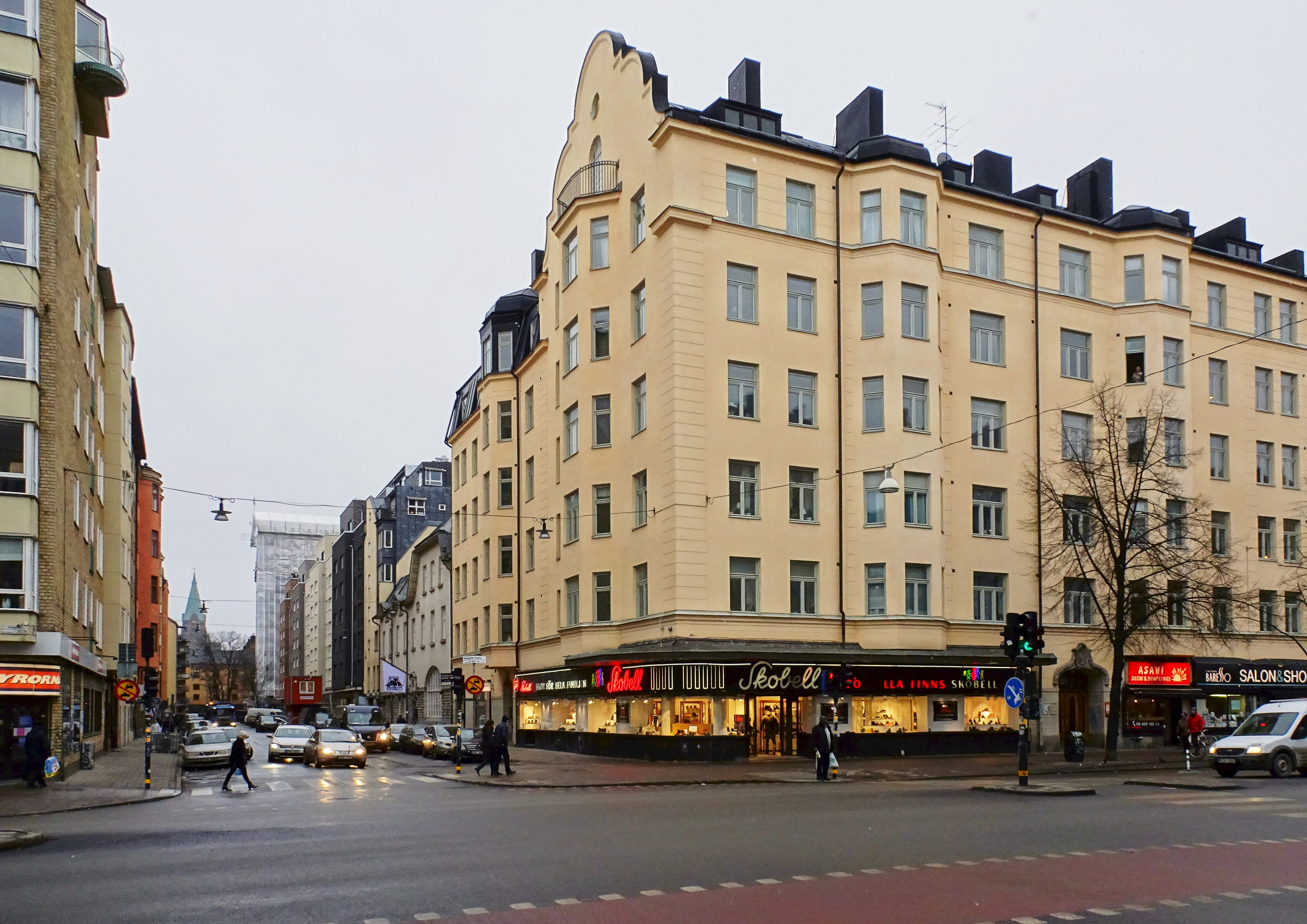
Blekingegatan 38, just to the left of the Skobell store, where Alberi was murdered

On 2 March 1989, 25-year-old Philippe Alberi (born 24 February 1964, in France) was murdered at Blekingegatan 38 in the Södermalm district of central Stockholm.

Alberi had just arrived in Stockholm to begin training as an acupuncturist when he was fatally stabbed. He had left Malmö and his girlfriend that evening, taking a flight to Stockholm Arlanda Airport. From there, he rode the airport bus to T-Centralen metro station, took the metro to Skanstull, and walked to Blekingegatan. After entering the doorway to the building, he was attacked. He was stabbed in both the neck and chest area.

Due to the nature of the attack, police initially suspected a connection to a double murder that had occurred a couple of weeks earlier, on 15 February, at Regeringsgatan. (Note: Tahir Berisa (born 30 December 1965, in Yugoslavia) and Jorge Vicencio Menares (born 25 April 1963, in Chile) were shot in the head and then had their throats slit in Berisa's apartment at Regeringsgatan 70E in Stockholm on 15 February 1989. During the same attack, Berisa's fiancée was severely beaten with a clothes iron. A 25-year-old man was arrested on suspicion of the murders but was later released. Later that same year, he himself was murdered—an act police suspect was a revenge killing. Investigators believed that the motive behind the unsolved double murder was connected to drug-related activity. The suspected killer, Peter Eriksson (born 16 July 1964), was murdered ten months later, on 11 December 1989, at Essinge brogata 15 in Lilla Essingen in central Stockholm. He was shot dead with two bullets outside his residence. Two close relatives of one of the victims from the double murder—a 34-year-old woman and a 17-year-old man—were charged with Eriksson's murder but were acquitted in district court.) However, once Alberi was identified, that theory was dismissed. Later, some speculated that Alberi's murder might have been connected to the series of three "porn murders," though he had no known ties to the pornography industry.

=== Assault prior to the murders ===
On the evening of 17 March 1989—five days before the first murder—a man in his 40s was brutally assaulted on his way home after closing his adult video store in central Stockholm. He was walking to retrieve his car, parked a few blocks away. As he closed up shop, he noticed a man in a tracksuit lingering by the doorway next to the store. The man turned away as the shopkeeper passed. Just before reaching his car, the shopkeeper noticed a shadow behind him, then felt a blow to the back of his head. He never saw his attacker. At the same moment, his bag was ripped from his hand. Inside were parts of the day's takings (about 600 kronor) and some fishing tackle, including a large fish-gutting knife. The victim later speculated in the media that this knife could have been used in the later murders. A security guard had seen someone running from the area just minutes after the attack.

=== Police appeal and theories ===
By May 1990, Stockholm police reported that they had few leads or tips regarding the killer. In a letter sent to adult video stores, the police appealed to store owners, employees, and customers to report any observations that could help solve the crimes. The letter included the line: “Since the murderer is still at large, we cannot rule out the possibility that he will strike again.” It ended with a plea to take appropriate safety measures — for example, never working alone (especially late at night), never turning one’s back on customers, installing alarms, and ensuring good lighting.

The main theory was that all the murders had been committed by the same person. At one point, investigators considered a possible religious motive, since the three murders had occurred around major holidays: Easter, Ascension Day, and Christmas. Ahead of Easter and Ascension Day in 1990, police sent out another round of warning letters to video stores.

=== Connection to John Ausonius ===
Beginning in 1992, investigators also explored a potential connection to John Ausonius, who, in 1991 and 1992, had carried out a series of eleven shootings in Stockholm and Uppsala. His victims had in common either dark hair or dark skin. That theory was later dismissed, primarily because Ausonius had used firearms, not knives.

== In the media ==
On 4 May 1990, the case was featured on TV3's then-new reality legal program Efterlyst. It was covered again in the same show on 23 March 1992. On 22 January 2003, the case was featured in Efterlyst special.

On 20 March 2012, the case was revisited in the Sveriges Television's program Veckans brott.

In 2017, it was featured in Aftonbladet's crime series Brott & Straff.

On 8 November 2019, the first episode of the podcast series Olöst: Porrmorden was released on Spotify.

== See also ==
- List of unsolved murders (1980–1999)
