= Sven Rosendahl =

Swedish journalist, novelist and short story writer

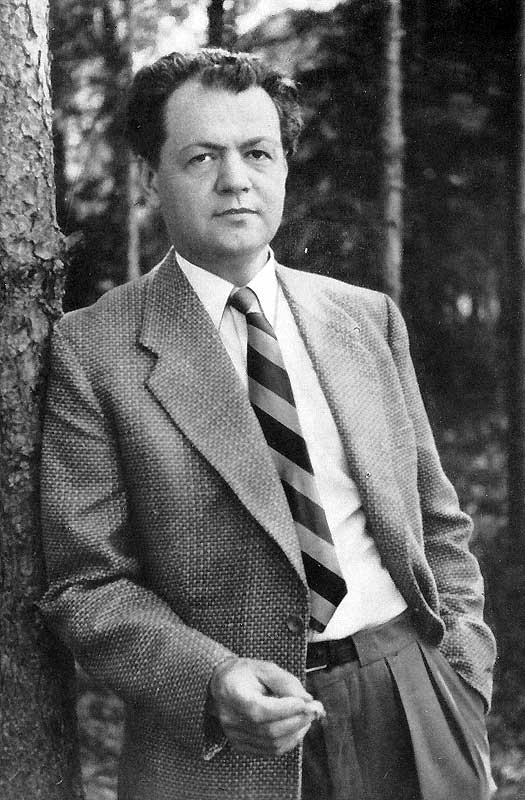
- Born: 7 April 1913
- Died: 8 September 1990 (aged 77)
- Occupations: Journalist, novelist and short story writer
- Awards: Dobloug Prize (1984)

Sven Viktor Rosendahl (7 April 1913 – 8 September 1990) was a Swedish journalist, novelist and short story writer. Among his books are the short story collection Svartstarr from 1949 and the novel Gud fader och tattaren from 1951. He was awarded the Dobloug Prize in 1984.
