= Svea Fireworks =

Swedish fireworks company

Svea Fireworks is Sweden's biggest importer of fireworks. The company was founded in 1993 and is based in Ängelholm, Skåne County. It has since also established itself in Norway, Poland, Estonia, Latvia, and Hungary. The company imports its fireworks from China.
