= Alexandra Höglund =

Swedish footballer

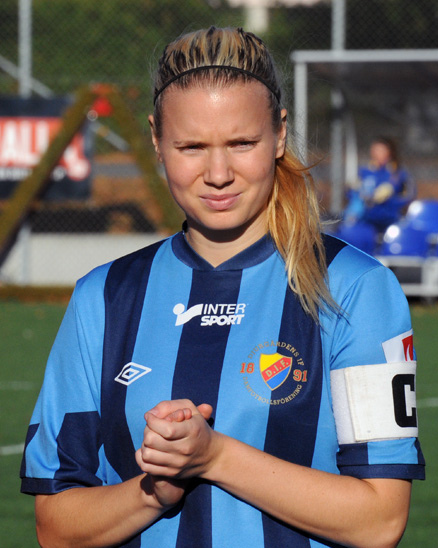
- Alexandra Höglund in 2013.

Personal information
- Date of birth: 18 September 1990 (age 36)
- Place of birth: Sweden
- Height: 1.70 m (5 ft 7 in)
- Position: Forward

Youth career
- Gimo IF

Senior career*
Years	Team	Apps	(Gls)
2008	Bälinge IF	11	(1)
2009–2017	Djurgårdens IF	151	(38)
- * Club domestic league appearances and goals as of 7 September 2016

Alexandra Höglund (born 18 September 1990) is a Swedish football forward who has played for Djurgårdens IF. She has played Damallsvenskan football for Djurgårdens IF and Bälinge IF.
