= Torsten Löwgren =

Swedish artist (1903–1991)

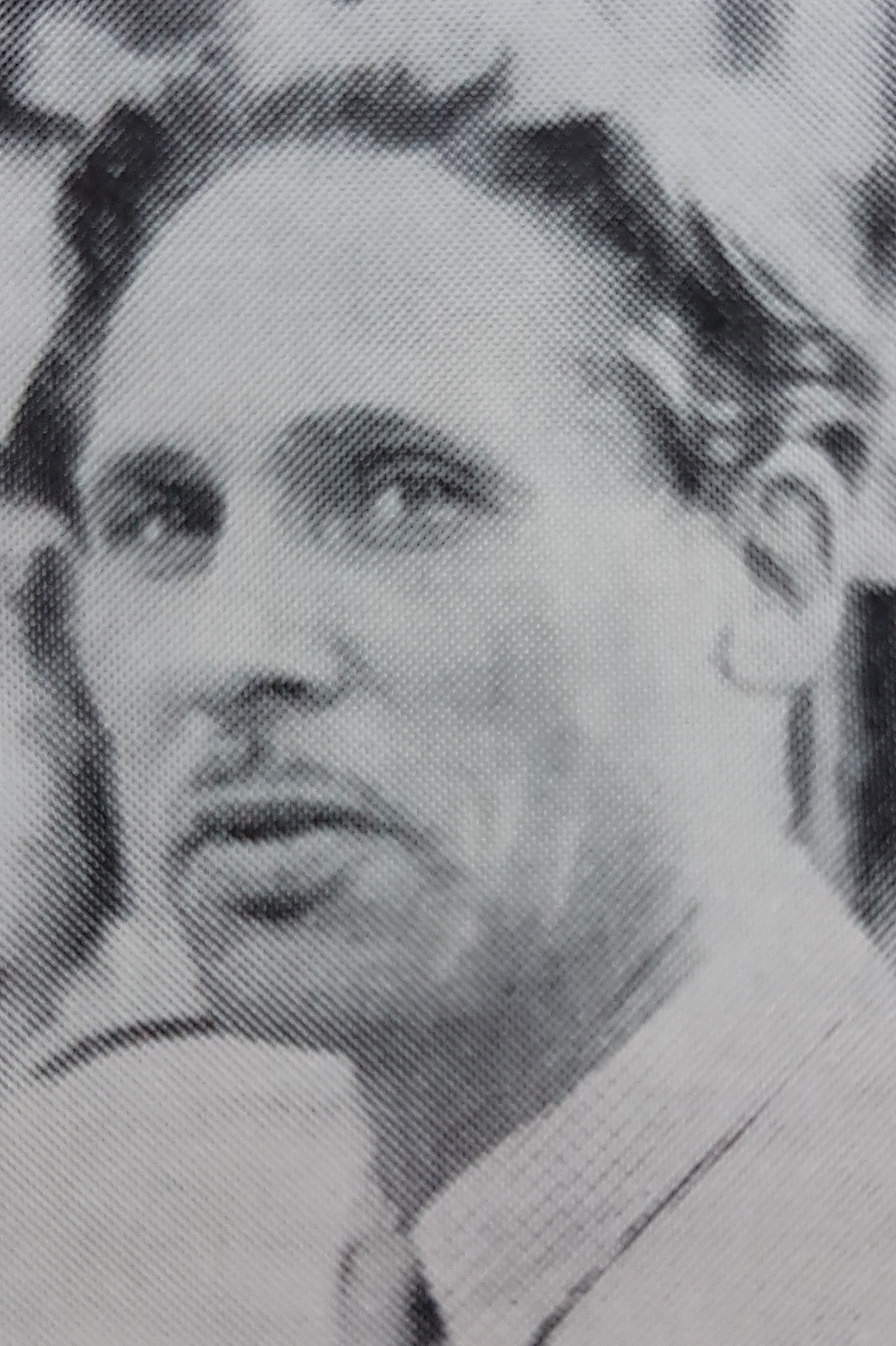
Torsten Konrad Löwgren

Torsten Konrad Löwgren (1903–1991) was a Swedish painter, born in Gävle. He studied at Lennart Berggrens målarskola in Stockholm, and at the Royal Swedish Academy of Arts. He painted landscapes from Stockholm and its surroundings.

== Paintings ==
- On the beach (På stranden), 1931, 29.5x40 cm, Oil/paper
- Street Scene in the Snow, 1931, 47x54 cm, Oil/canvas
- Standing female Nude in a Shower, 1929, 37.1x23.9 cm, Oil/panel
- Vintrig Dalgång, 1941, 50x50 cm, Oil/panel
