= Severt Dennolf =

Swedish long-distance runner

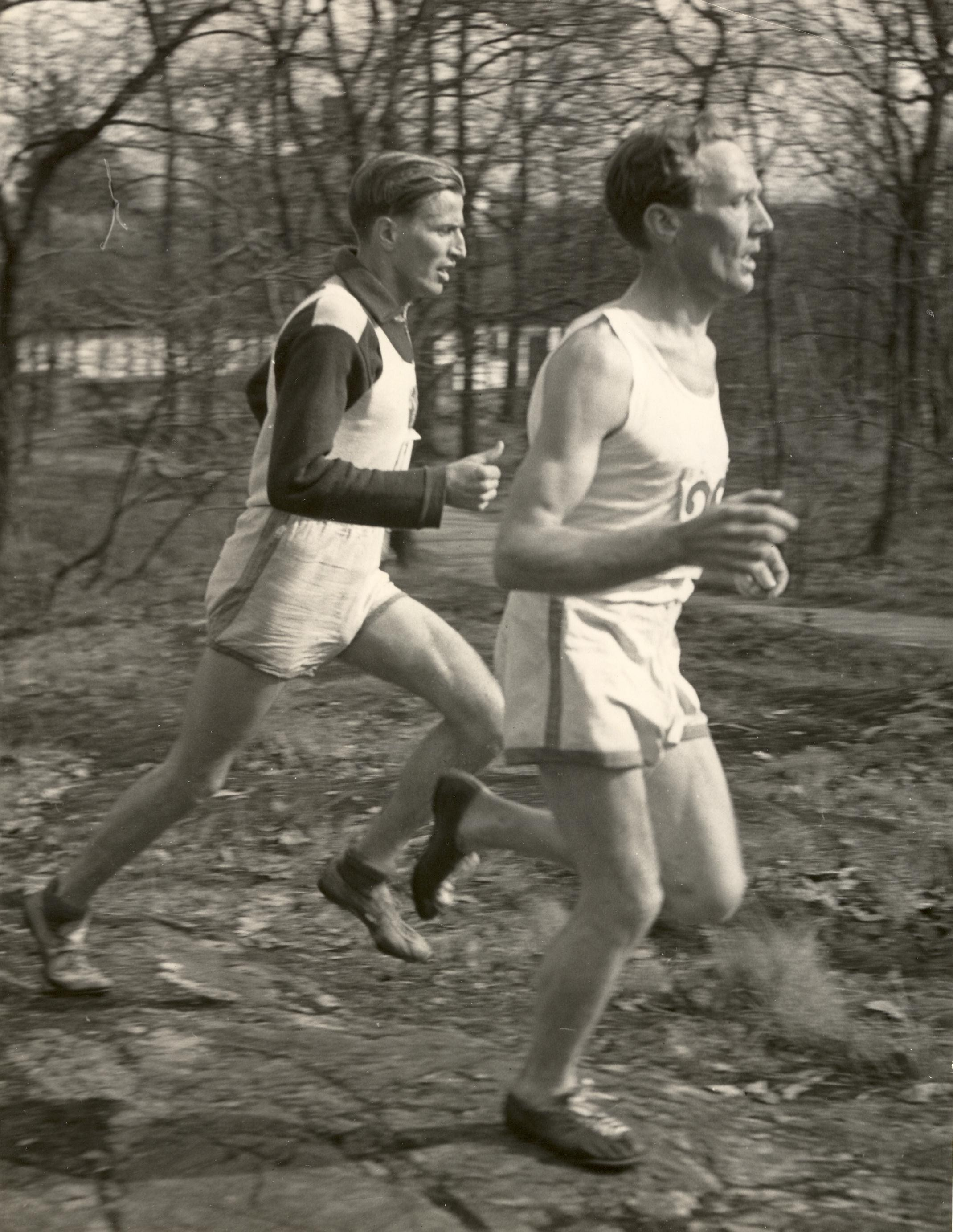
- Severt Dennolf (left) and Valter Nyström in 1949

Personal information
- Born: 13 May 1920 Nordmaling, Sweden
- Died: 8 May 1990 (aged 69) Nordmaling, Sweden
- Height: 1.75 m (5 ft 9 in)
- Weight: 67 kg (148 lb)

Sport
- Sport: Athletics
- Event: 10,000 m
- Club: Nordmalings IF

Achievements and titles
- Personal best: 10,000 m – 30:13.2 (1949)

Severt Dennolf (13 May 1920 – 8 May 1990) was a Swedish long-distance runner. He competed in the 1948 Summer Olympics in the 10,000 m event and finished fifth.
