= Herman Carlsson =

Swedish ice hockey player

Personal information
- Nationality: Swedish
- Born: 11 September 1906; Stockholm, Sweden
- Died: 18 February 1990 (aged 83); Stockholm, Sweden

Sport
- Sport: Ice hockey

Herman Karl Carlsson (11 September 1906 – 18 February 1990) was a Swedish ice hockey player. He competed in the men's tournament at the 1936 Winter Olympics.
