= Emil Herge =

Swedish footballer

Emil Hergé
Personal information
- Full name: Emil Hergé
- Date of birth: 15 January 1990 (age 36)
- Place of birth: Sweden
- Height: 1.90 m (6 ft 3 in)
- Position: Midfielder

Team information
- Current team: FC Linköping City
- Number: 4

Youth career
- Åtvidabergs FF

Senior career*
Years	Team	Apps	(Gls)
2009–2012	Åtvidabergs FF	6	(0)
2011	→ Vimmerby IF (loan)	20	(1)
2012	Vimmerby IF	19	(1)
2013–2014	Motala AIF	19	(2)
2015–	FC Linköping City	5	(1)
- * Club domestic league appearances and goals as of 14 May 2015

Emil Hergé (born 15 January 1990) is a Swedish footballer who plays for FC Linköping City as a defender.
