= Kai Curry-Lindahl =

Swedish zoologist and author

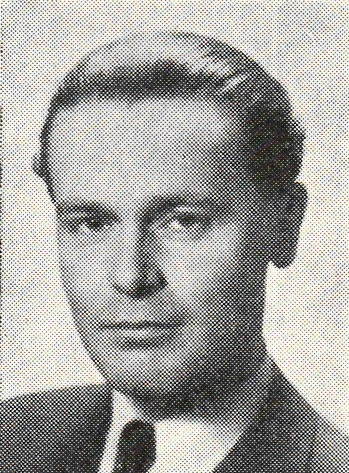
- Born: 10 May 1917; Stockholm, Sweden
- Died: 5 December 1990 (aged 73)
- Education: Lund University Uppsala University (PhD h.c.)
- Scientific career
- Fields: Biology; Conservation biology Zoology
- Workplaces: Skansen; Stockholm University; University of California, Berkeley; University of Guelph; IUCN; UNESCO

Kai Curry-Lindahl (10 May 1917 – 5 December 1990), was a Swedish zoologist and author. Curry-Lindahl began his career as a publisher of scientific literature and was active in both academia and as a civil servant. He published over 600 scientific articles and more than 100 books during his lifetime.

== Early life ==
Kai Curry-Lindahl was born on 10 May 1917 in Stockholm, Sweden to the banker Curry Lindahl and Margit Lindahl (née Törnblom). He studied at Lund University and Uppsala University.

== Writing ==
In 1937, he began work as a publisher at the Stockholm-based publishing house Natur & Kultur, where he remained until 1944. Between 1943 and 1951, he also worked at the Swedish Society for Nature Conservation as a publisher. From 1945 to 1953, Curry-Lindahl also served as the managing director and editor-in-chief of the magazine Sveriges Natur (Sweden's Nature), which was published as a member's magazine by the society. He was also a contributor to Svenska Dagbladet.

== Academic career ==
Curry-Lindahl was a participant in several zoological expeditions, including trips to Greenland, the USA, Canada, Mexico, Tanganyika and Uganda. He also led two expeditions himself: Lund University's expedition to Belgian Congo, Rwanda and Burundi in 1951-1952 and the Swedish Congo Expedition in 1958-1959.

He was the head of the Skansen's natural history department between 1953 and 1974, and also worked as a conservation expert associated with the Stockholm University between 1966 and 1969. Between 1974 and 1983 he was a visiting professor at the University of California, Berkeley, and in 1974 and 1978 at the University of Guelph, Ontario. He received a honorary doctorate in Zaire in 1963 and at Uppsala University in 1974. He was involved with Dian Fossey's work in the conservation of gorillas in Rwanda.

== Environmental policy and conservation ==
Curry-Lindahl was involved in several national and international agencies and organisations during his lifetime. From 1956 to 1969, Curry-Lindahl served as the Director of Research of the Vertebrate Ecological Survey of areas in Sweden threatened by governmental hydroelectric development. He also served as a board member of the IUCN between 1956 and 1981.

Between 1961 and 1983, Curry-Lindahl worked on various missions for the United Nations and national governments in 26 countries across six continents. He was involved in several UN agencies, including FAO, UNESCO, and UNEP, which included consulting and advicing 35 African nations. Curry-Lindahl chaired multiple congresses and committees concerned with conservation, ecology and zoology, including a joint committee of the governments of the Congo (Kinshasa) Rwanda and Uganda on national parks and boundary problems in Goma, Zaire, between 1967-1968.

Other positions served by Curry-Lindahl include:

- Member of the Executive Board of the World Wildlife Fund (WWF), 1964–1971
- Vice-Chairman, International Commission on National Parks of the IUCN, 1966–1972
- Secretary of the International Council for Bird Protection (ICBP, now BirdLife International), 1958–1974
- Member of the International Ornithological Committee, 1958–his death

== Personal life ==
Kai Curry-Lindahl married Anne van der Voordt (1925–2018) in 1947. The couple had three children: Brigitte (born 1948), Edith (born 1950) and Robin (born 1951). At the time of his death, he was living in Lidingö and Nairobi, Kenya.

== Honours ==
Curry-Lindahl received various honours and awards, including:

- Officer of the Order of Leopold, Belgium
- Officer of the Order of the Crown, Belgium
- Officer of the Order of the Golden Ark, Netherlands
- Commander of the Order of the Polar Star, Sweden (KNO)
- Silver medal of the Royal Swedish Academy of Science
- Grande Médaille Geoffroy-Saint-Hilaire of the Société Nationale de Protection de la Nature

== Books (selected) ==
- Animals and humans in the Swedish countryside, 1955, Stockholm
- Some animal species distribution - Animal Geography, 1957, Stockholm
- Forests and animals, 1961, Stockholm
- Europe's natural, 1971, Stockholm
- Conservation for Survival: An Ecological Strategy, New York, 1972
- Lemming - a artmonografi, 1975, Bonnier, Stockholm, ISBN 91-0-039966-3
- Birds over land and sea A global overview of bird migration, 1975, Stockholm
- Wildlife of the Prairies and Plains, 1981, New York.
- The endangered animals worldwide, 1982, Stockholm
- The Future Of The Cairngorms, 1982, North East Mountains Trust with Adam Watson & R Drennan-Watson
- Our fish, 1985, Stockholm
- Mammals, amphibians & reptiles, 1988, Stockholm
- Tropical mountains, 1953, Stockholm
- The birds of Mount Nimba, Liberia ISBN 0-565-00982-6 British Museum (Natural History) 1986 with Colston, Peter R
