= Vålådalen Nature Reserve =

Nature reserve in Jämtland, Sweden

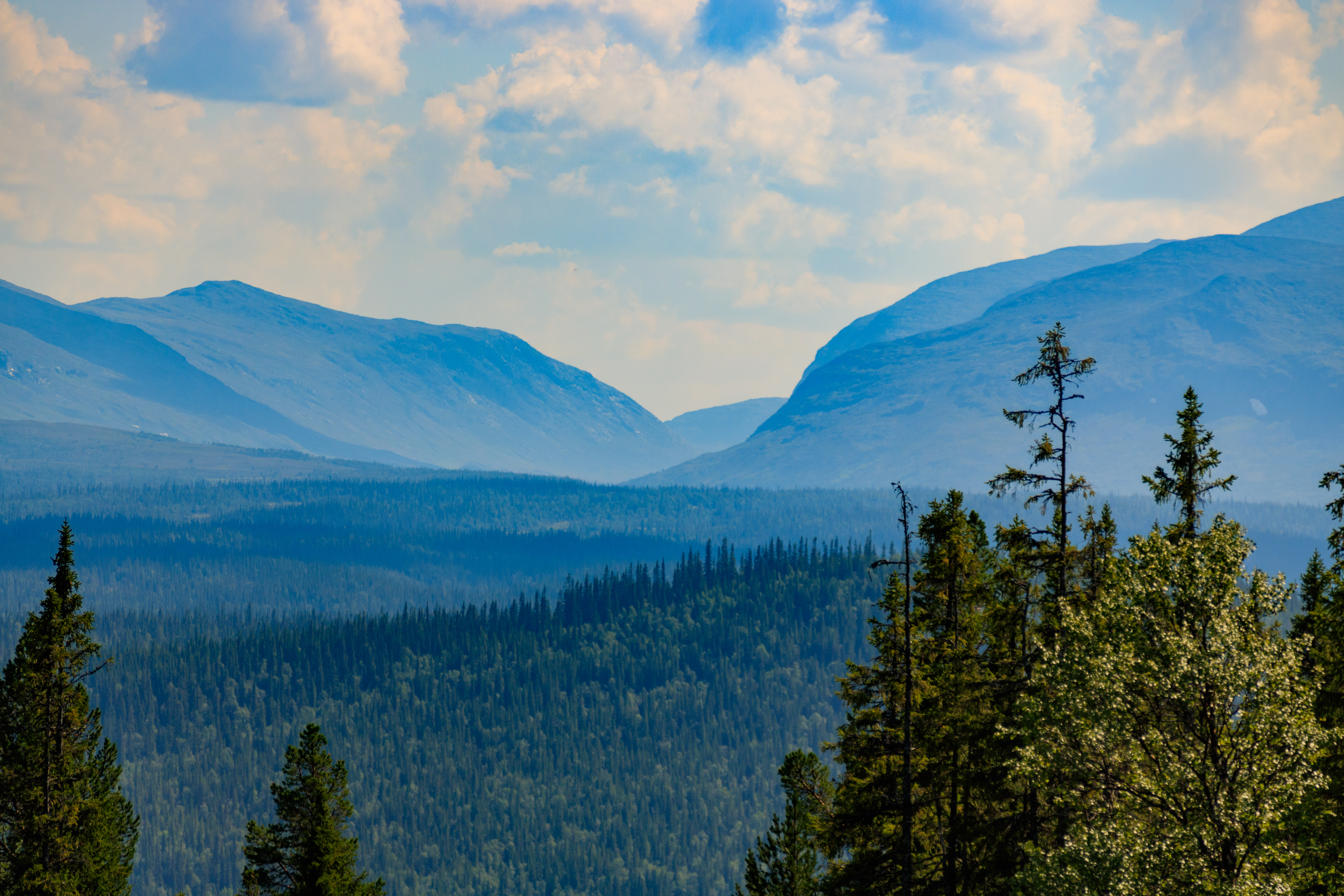
- Lunndörren seen from Ottfjället

- Location within Jämtland Location within Sweden
- Location: Sweden
- Nearest city: Östersund
- Coordinates: 63°05′24″N 12°49′48″E
- Area: 1,180 km^{2} (290,000 acres)
- Established: 1988

Vålådalen Nature Reserve (Swedish: Vålådalens naturreservat) is a nature reserve in Jämtland County in Sweden. It is part of the EU-wide Natura 2000-network.

The nature reserve contains a varied landscape with mountain tops, forests and wetlands. The area contains several geological peculiarities such as pyramidal hills, formed during the end-stages of the last Ice age. The fauna is rich, with species which are threatened in Sweden such as wolverine and Arctic fox represented. The flora also contains some unusual species (e.g. several types of orchids).
