= Andreas Forsström =

Swedish ice hockey player

- Born: 24 January 1991 (age 34) Östersund, Sweden
- Height: 6 ft 0 in (183 cm)
- Weight: 179 lb (81 kg; 12 st 11 lb)
- Position: Left wing
- Shoots: Left
- Elitserien team: Modo Hockey
- Playing career: 2010–present

Andreas Forsström (born 24 January 1991) is a Swedish professional ice hockey player. He played with Modo Hockey in the Elitserien during the 2010–11 Elitserien season.
