= 1918 in Sweden =

- Decades: 1890s; 1900s; 1910s; 1920s; 1930s
- See also: Other events of 1918; Timeline of Swedish history

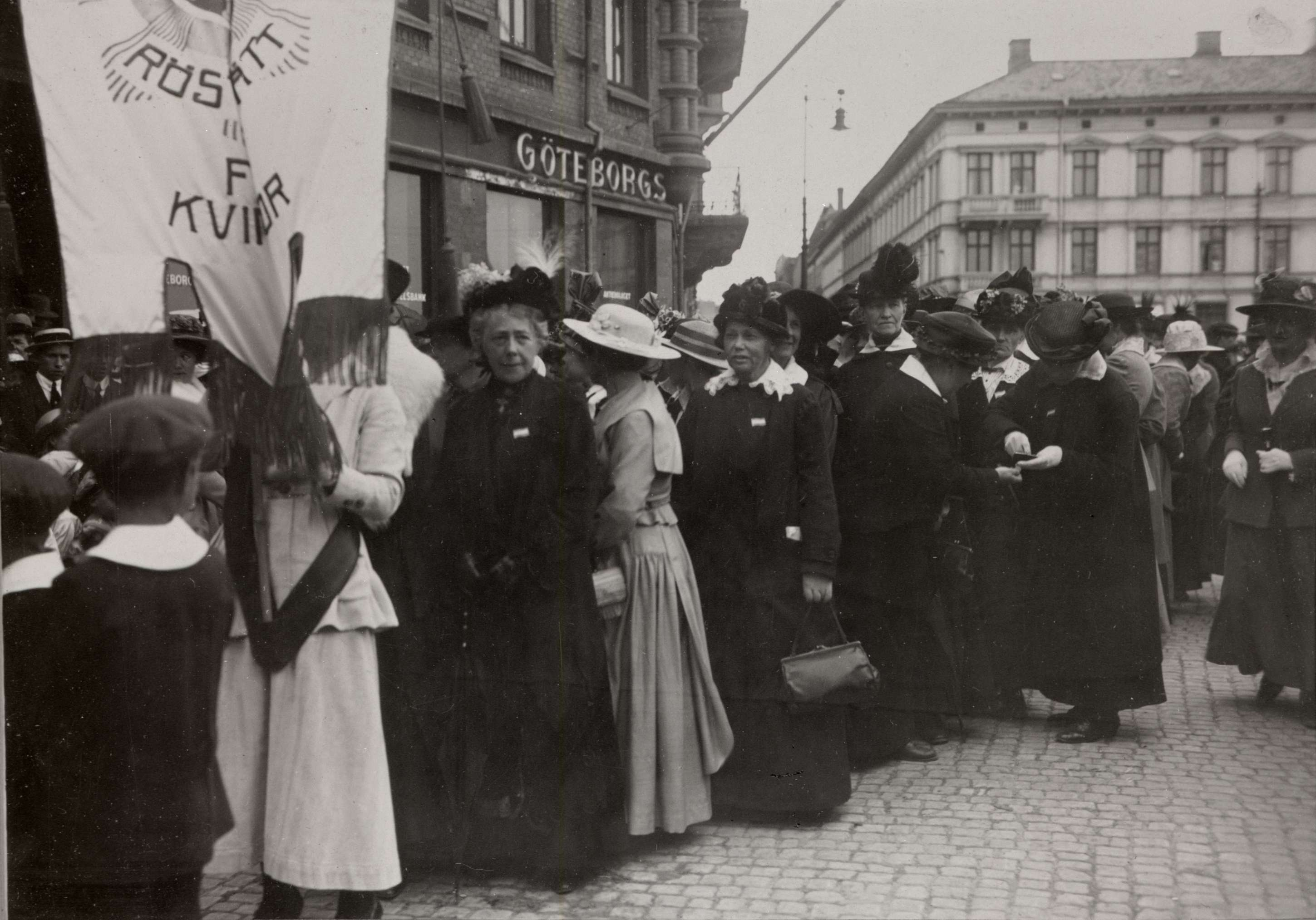
Frigga Carlberg and others demonstrating for women's suffrage in Gothenburg, June 1918.

Events from the year 1918 in Sweden

== Incumbents ==
- Monarch – Gustaf V
- Prime Minister - Nils Edén

== Events ==
- 14 March – Eva Andén is elected the first female member of the Swedish Bar Association.
- 14 June - The Poor Care Regulation of 1918 replaces the Poor Care Regulation of 1871: it abolishes the poor houses, the Rotegång, Poor Auctions, and other outdated poor care methods.
- The forced registration and medical examination system of prostitutes is abolished. The Svenska Federationen, having reached its goal, is therefore dissolved.

== Births ==
- 16 January – Allan Ekelund, film producer (died 2009)
- 17 May - Birgit Nilsson, operatic soprano (died 2005)
- 14 July - Ingmar Bergman, director, writer, and producer in film, television, theater, and radio (died 2007)
- 22 July - Christer Strömholm, photographer and educator (died 2002

== Deaths ==
- 3 April – Olof Palme, historian (born 1884)
- Hulda Mellgren, industrialist (born 1839)
- 29 June – Carl Cederström, pioneering Swedish aviator (b. 1867)
