= Swedish emigration to the United States =

Swedish population movements to the US

Poster showing a cross-section of the Cunard Line's immigrant liner RMS Aquitania, launched in 1913.

During the 19th and early 20th centuries, about 1.3 million Swedes left Sweden for the United States of America. While the land of the American frontier was a magnet for the rural poor all over Europe, some factors encouraged Swedish emigration in particular. Religious repression and idiosyncrasy practiced by the Swedish Lutheran State Church was widely resented, as was social conservatism and snobbery influenced by the Swedish monarchy. Population growth and crop failures made conditions in the Swedish countryside increasingly bleak. By contrast, reports from early Swedish emigrants painted the American Midwest as an earthly paradise.

According to Joy K. Lintelman, mass migration from Sweden to the United States unfolded in five distinct waves between the 1840s and 1920s. Within this period, hundreds of thousands of Swedish emigrants made their way over and settled in both rural and urban scapes of the United States. Factors which brought migration to a trickle were found on both sides of the Atlantic, with restrictions on immigration placed in the United States and improving social and economic conditions in Sweden being the primary factors.

Swedish migration to the United States peaked in the decades after the American Civil War (1861–1865). By 1890 the U.S. census reported a Swedish-American population of nearly 800,000. These rising emigration rates caused great concern in Sweden. However, before any reform could be done to avoid a continuous flow of Swedish citizens fleeing the home land, World War I (1914–1918) broke out and effectively ended the process. From the mid-1920s, there was no longer a Swedish mass emigration.

== Early history: the Swedish-American dream ==
The Swedish West India Company established a colony on the Delaware River in 1638, naming it New Sweden. A small, short-lived colonial settlement, it was lost to the Dutch in New Netherland in 1655. Until 1656, close to 700 Swedish and Finnish settlers had migrated to the colony, of which perhaps 40% was Finnish; what is now the country of Finland was then part of Sweden, and many Finns had migrated to Sweden proper, particularly Värmland, from whence they came to America. Many of the Finns spoke Swedish as a first language, and the clergymen who came to New Sweden were all speakers of Swedish. Finnish was apparently forgotten by 1750 or so; Swedish held on until the late 18th century. While generally the Swedes thought of themselves not as colonizers, having been spared the bloody conflicts with indigenous Americans had with other colonists and of having had good relations with them, new research has complicated that idea.

The historian H. A. Barton has suggested that the greatest significance of New Sweden was the strong and long-lasting interest in America that the colony generated in Sweden. America was seen as the standard-bearer of liberalism and personal freedom, and became an ideal for liberal Swedes. Their admiration for America was combined with the notion of a past Swedish Golden Age with ancient Nordic ideals. Supposedly corrupted by foreign influences, the timeless "Swedish values" would be recovered by Swedes in the New World. This remained a fundamental theme of Swedish, and later Swedish-American, discussion of America, though the recommended "timeless" values changed over time. In the 17th and 18th centuries, Swedes who called for greater religious freedom would often refer to America as the supreme symbol of it. The emphasis shifted from religion to politics in the 19th century, when liberal citizens of the hierarchic Swedish class society looked with admiration to the American Republicanism and civil rights. In the early 20th century, the Swedish-American dream even embraced the idea of a welfare state responsible for the well-being of all its citizens. Underneath these shifting ideas ran from the start the current which carried all before it in the later 20th century: America as the symbol and dream of unfettered individualism.

Swedish debate about the United States remained mostly theoretical before the 19th century, since very few Swedes had any personal experience of the nation. Emigration was illegal and population was seen as the wealth of nations. However, the Swedish population doubled in size between 1750 and 1850 a time of "peace, vaccination, and potatoes", and as population growth outstripped economic development, it gave rise to fears of overpopulation based on the influential population theory of Thomas Malthus. In the 1830s, the laws against emigration were repealed.

== 19th century ==
Akenson argues that hard times in Sweden before 1867 produced a strong push effect, but that for cultural reasons most Swedes refused to emigrate and clung on at home. Akenson says the state wanted to keep its population high and:

The upper classes' need for a cheap and plentiful labor force, the instinctive willingness of the clergy of the state church to discourage emigration on both moral and social grounds, and the deference of the lower orders to the arcade of powers that hovered above them—all these things formed an architecture of cultural hesitancy concerning emigration.

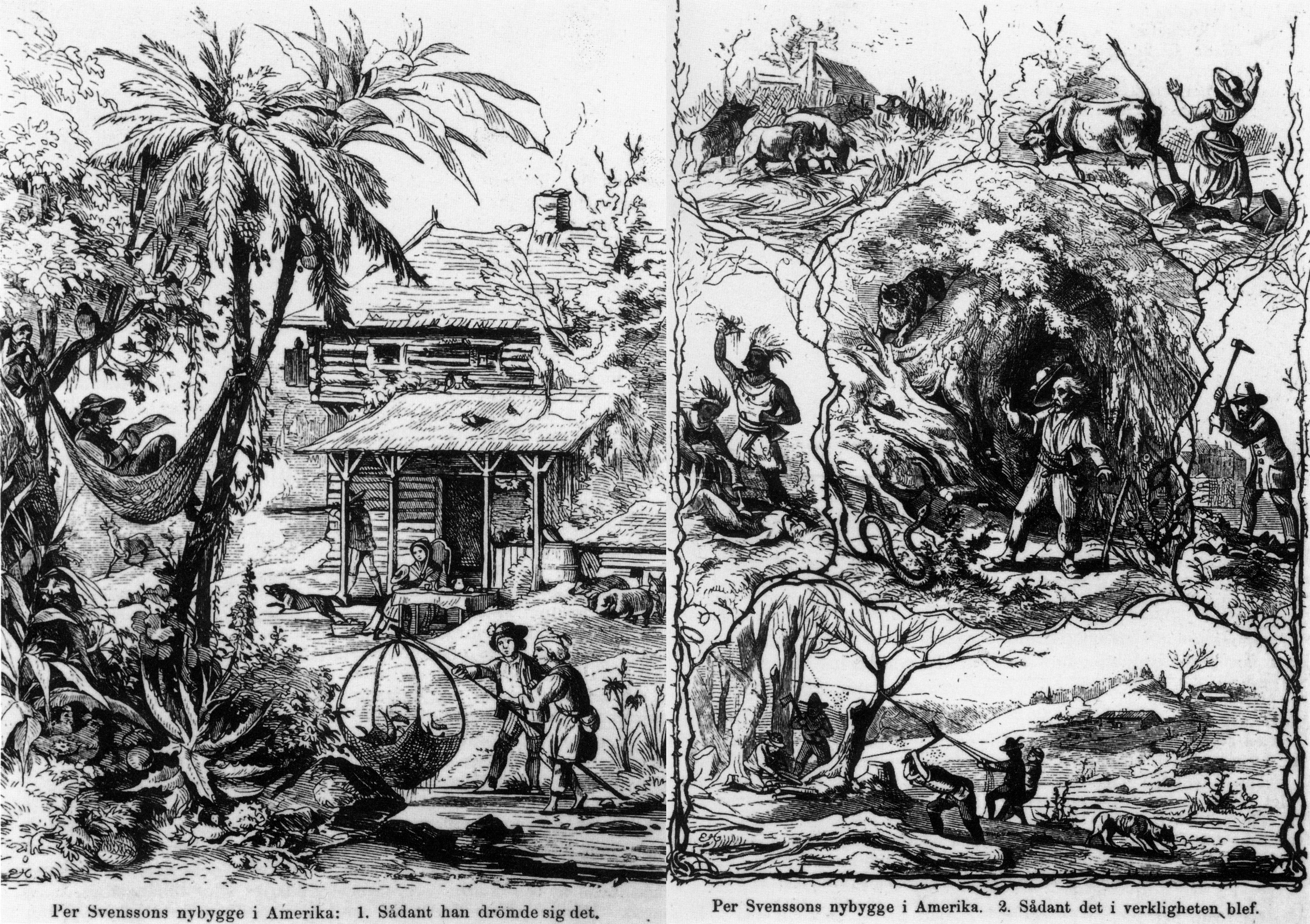
Swedish anti-emigration propaganda, representing Per Svensson's dream of the American idyll (left) and the reality of Per's life in the wilderness (right), where he is menaced by a mountain lion, a big snake, and wild Indians, seen scalping and disembowelling a man.

A few "countercultural" deviants from the mainstream did leave and showed the way. The severe economic hardship of the "Great Deprivation" of 1867 to 1869, finally overcame the reluctance and the floodgates opened to produce an "emigration culture".

=== European mass emigration: push and pull ===
Large-scale European emigration to the United States started in the 1840s in Britain, Ireland and Germany. That was followed by a rising wave after 1850 from most Northern European countries, and in turn by Central and Southern Europe. Research into the forces behind this European mass emigration has relied on sophisticated statistical methods. One theory which has gained wide acceptance is Jerome's analysis in 1926 of the "push and pull" factors—the impulses to emigration generated by conditions in Europe and the U.S. respectively. Jerome found that fluctuations in emigration co-varied more with economic developments in the U.S. than in Europe, and deduced that the pull was stronger than the push. Jerome's conclusions have been challenged, but still form the basis of much work on the subject.

Emigration patterns in the Nordic countries—Finland, Sweden, Norway, Denmark, and Iceland—show striking variation. Nordic mass emigration started in Norway, which also retained the highest rate throughout the century. Swedish emigration got underway in the early 1840s, and had the third-highest rate in all of Europe, after Ireland and Norway. Denmark had a consistently low rate of emigration, while Iceland had a late start but soon reached levels comparable to Norway. Finland, whose mass emigration did not start until the late 1880s, and at the time part of the Russian Empire, is usually classified as part of the Eastern European wave.

=== Crossing the Atlantic ===
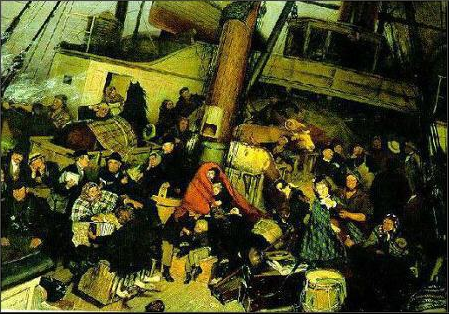
The Emigrants by Knut Ekwall (1843–1912) represents the artist's vision of what the 19th-century transatlantic experience might be like. Date unknown.

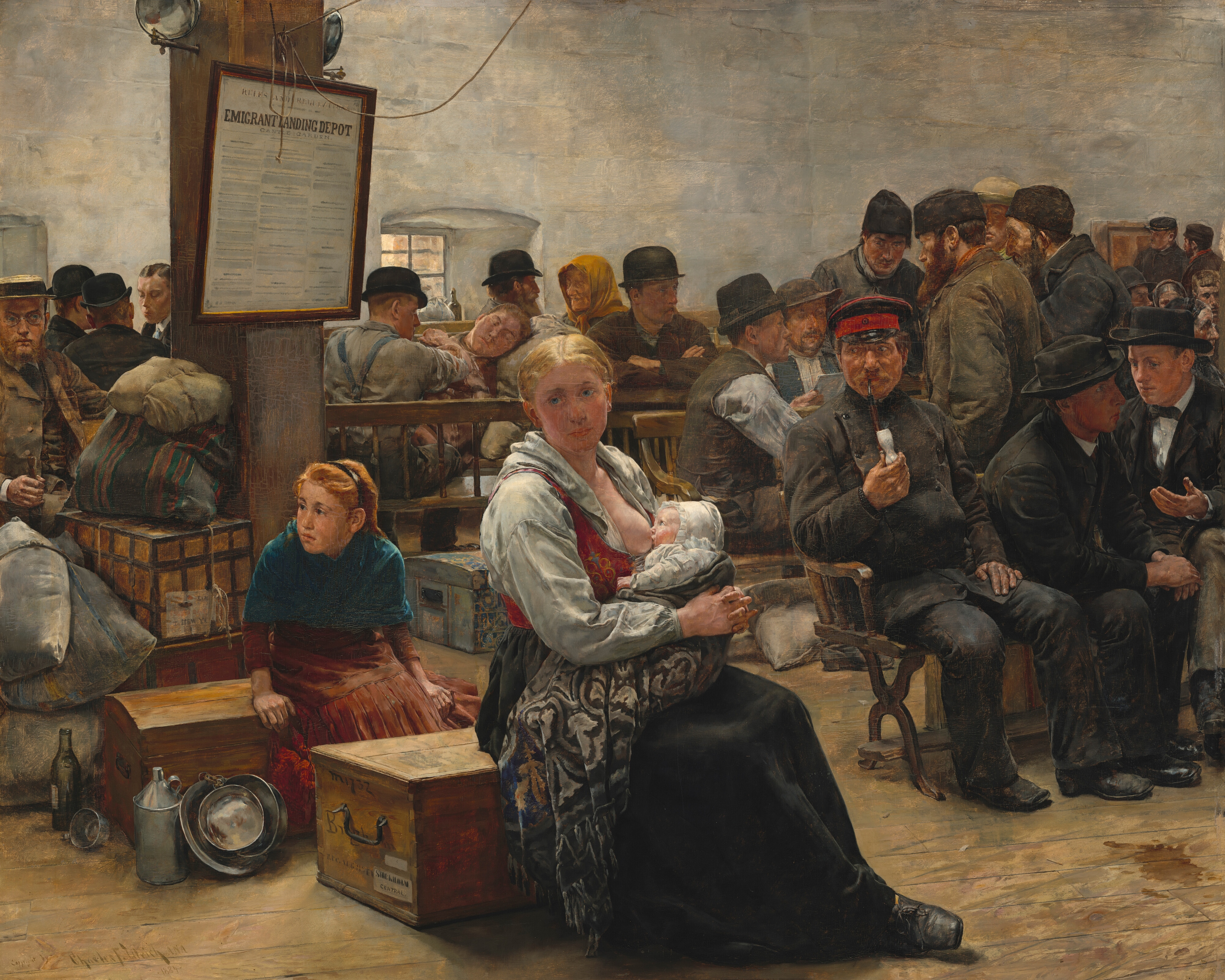
In the Land of Promise, Castle Garden, 1884, by Charles Frederic Ulrich, showing the Emigrant Landing Depot in Manhattan

The first European emigrants travelled in the holds of sailing cargo ships. With the advent of the age of steam, an efficient transatlantic passenger transport mechanism was established at the end of the 1860s. It was based on huge ocean liners run by international shipping lines, most prominently Cunard, White Star, and Inman. The speed and capacity of the large steamships meant that tickets became cheaper. From the Swedish port towns of Stockholm, Malmö and Gothenburg, transport companies operated various routes, some of them with complex early stages and consequently a long and trying journey on the road and at sea. Thus North German transport agencies relied on the regular Stockholm—Lübeck steamship service to bring Swedish emigrants to Lübeck, and from there on German train services to take them to Hamburg or Bremen. There they would board ships to the British ports of Southampton and Liverpool and change to one of the great transatlantic liners bound for New York. The majority of Swedish emigrants, however, travelled from Gothenburg to Hull, UK, on dedicated boats run by the Wilson Line, then by train across Britain to Liverpool and the big ships.

During the later 19th century, the major shipping lines financed Swedish emigrant agents and paid for the production of large quantities of emigration propaganda. Much of this promotional material, such as leaflets, was produced by immigration promoters in the U.S. Propaganda and advertising by shipping line agents was often blamed for emigration by the conservative Swedish ruling class, which grew increasingly alarmed at seeing the agricultural labor force leave the country. It was a Swedish 19th-century cliché to blame the falling ticket prices and the pro-emigration propaganda of the transport system for the craze of emigration, but modern historians have varying views about the real importance of such factors. Brattne and Åkerman have examined the advertising campaigns and the ticket prices as a possible third force between push and pull. They conclude that neither advertisements nor pricing had any decisive influence on Swedish emigration. While the companies remain unwilling, as of 2007, to open their archives to researchers, the limited sources available suggest that ticket prices did drop in the 1880s, but remained on average artificially high because of cartels and price-fixing. On the other hand, H. A. Barton states that the cost of crossing the Atlantic dropped drastically between 1865 and 1890, encouraging poorer Swedes to emigrate. The research of Brattne and Åkerman has shown that the leaflets sent out by the shipping line agents to prospective emigrants would not so much celebrate conditions in the New World, as simply emphasize the comforts and advantages of the particular company. Descriptions of life in America were unvarnished, and the general advice to emigrants brief and factual. Newspaper advertising, while very common, tended to be repetitive and stereotyped in content.

=== Mid-19th century ===
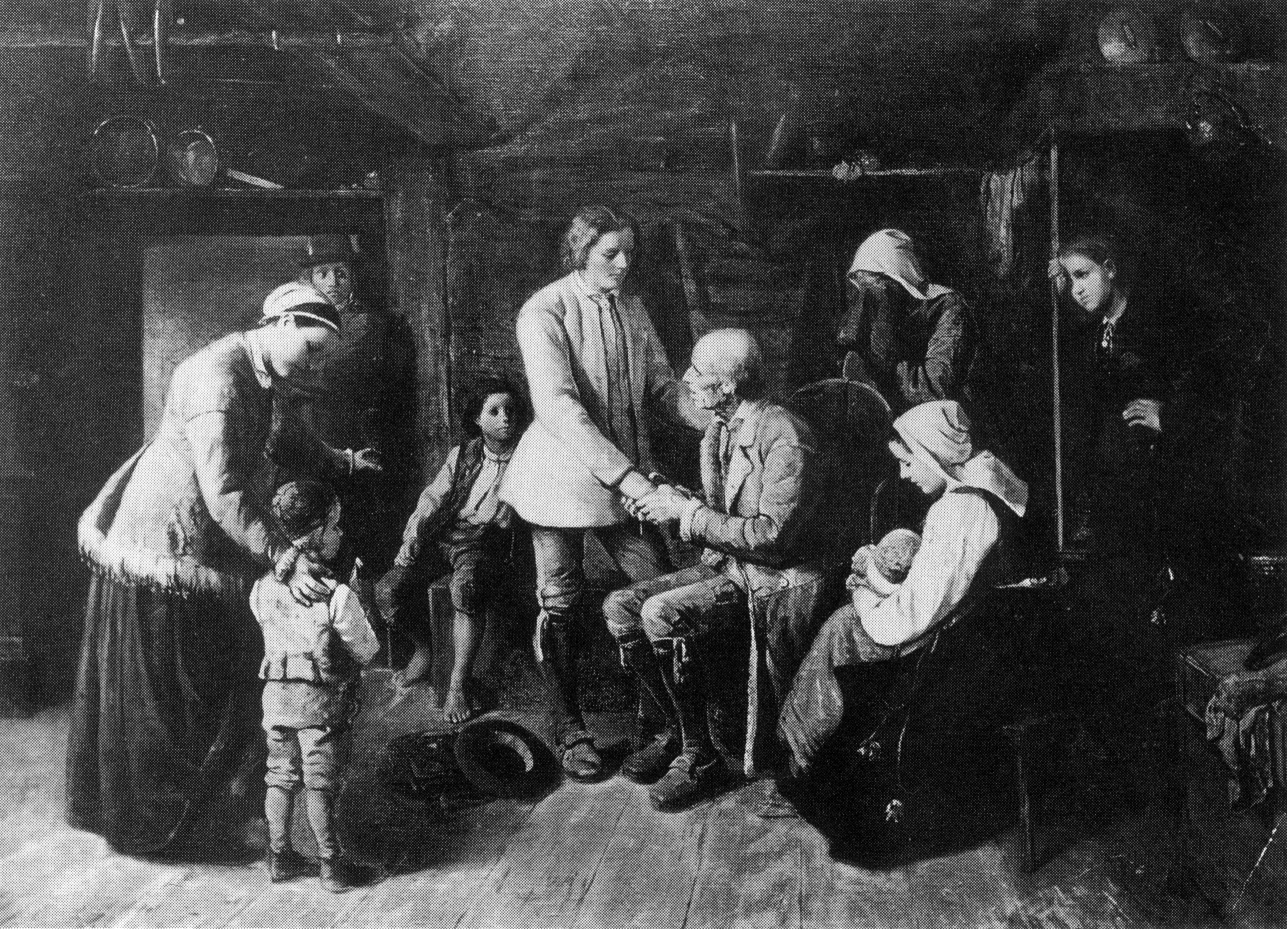
The Emigrants by S. V. Helander (1839–1901): a young farmer bids a sober farewell to friends and relatives.

Swedish mass migration took off in the spring of 1841 with the departure of Uppsala University graduate Gustaf Unonius (1810–1902) together with his wife, a maid, and two students. This small group founded a settlement they named New Upsala in Waukesha County, Wisconsin, and began to clear the wilderness, full of enthusiasm for frontier life in "one of the most beautiful valleys the world can offer". Though he would eventually become disillusioned with life in the U.S. and return to Sweden, his reports in praise of the simple and virtuous pioneer life, published in the liberal newspaper Aftonbladet, had already begun to draw Swedes westward.

The rising Swedish exodus was caused by economic, political, and religious conditions affecting particularly the rural population. Europe was in the grip of an economic depression. In Sweden, population growth and repeated crop failures were making it increasingly difficult to make a living from the tiny land plots on which at least three quarters of the inhabitants depended. Rural conditions were especially bleak in the stony and unforgiving Småland province, which became the heartland of emigration. The American Midwest was an agricultural antipode to Småland, for it, Unonius reported in 1842, "more closely than any other country in the world approaches the ideal which nature seems to have intended for the happiness and comfort of humanity." Prairie land in the Midwest was ample, loamy, and government-owned. From 1841 it was sold to squatters for $1.25 per acre, ($39 per acre ($96/ha) as of 2025), following the Preemption Act of 1841 (later replaced by the Homestead Act). The inexpensive and fertile land of Illinois, Iowa, Minnesota and Wisconsin was irresistible to landless and impoverished European peasants. It also attracted more well-established farmers.

The political freedom of the American republic exerted a similar pull. Swedish peasants were some of the most literate in Europe, and consequently had access to the European egalitarian and radical ideas that culminated in the Revolutions of 1848. The clash between Swedish liberalism and a repressive monarchist regime raised political awareness among the disadvantaged, many of whom looked to the U.S. to realize their republican ideals.

Dissenting religious practitioners also widely resented the treatment they received from the Lutheran State Church through the Conventicle Act. Conflicts between local worshipers and the new churches were most explosive in the countryside, where dissenting Pietist groups were more active, and were more directly under the eye of local law enforcement and the parish priest. Before non-Lutheran churches were granted toleration in 1809, clampdowns on illegal forms of worship and teaching often provoked whole groups of Pietists and Radical Pietists to leave together, intent on forming their own spiritual communities in the new land. The largest contingent of such dissenters, 1,500 followers of Eric Jansson, left in the late 1840s and founded a community in Bishop Hill, Illinois. Baptists, including the exiled F. O. Nilsson and fellow preachers Gustaf Palmquist and Anders Wiberg, started Baptist churches in the Midwest. The Mission Friends, who emigrated in the 1860s, would later found the Evangelical Free Church and Evangelical Covenant Church denominations. Lutherans such as Lars Paul Esbjörn – influenced by Pietism and Methodism and felt he was denied advancement in the church because of it – also found new opportunities in the United States. There he became one of the founders of the Augustana Evangelical Lutheran Church. Swedish Methodist pioneers like Victor Witting began to emigrate in the 1840s. Mormon converts found religious freedom in the United States as well.

The first Swedish emigrant guidebook was published as early as 1841, the year Unonius left, and nine handbooks were published between 1849 and 1855. Substantial groups of lumberjacks and iron miners were recruited directly by company agents in Sweden. Agents recruiting construction builders for American railroads also appeared, the first in 1854, scouting for the Illinois Central Railroad.

The Swedish establishment disapproved intensely of emigration. Seen as depleting the labor force and as a defiant act among the lower orders, emigration alarmed both the spiritual and the secular authorities. Many emigrant diaries and memoirs feature an emblematic early scene in which the local clergy warns travellers against risking their souls among foreign heretics. The conservative press described emigrants as lacking in patriotism and moral fibre: "No workers are more lazy, immoral and indifferent than those who immigrate to other places." Emigration was denounced as an unreasoning "mania" or "craze", implanted in an ignorant populace by "outside agents". The liberal press retorted that the "lackeys of monarchism" failed to take into account the miserable conditions in the Swedish countryside and the backwardness of Swedish economic and political institutions. "Yes, emigration is indeed a 'mania'", wrote the liberal Göteborgs Handels- och Sjöfartstidning sarcastically, "The mania of wanting to eat one's fill after one has worked oneself hungry! The craze of wanting to support oneself and one's family in an honest manner!"

The great Swedish famine of 1867–1869, caused by consecutive wet and dry years, followed by a year of mass epidemics, led to the migration to the US of 60,000 Swedes during that period--the start of the mass migration. Another contributing factor was the poverty of 19th-century Sweden, made worse by the abusive solutions practiced to complement the strict Poor Care Regulation of 1871, such as the rotegång, the pauper auction and child auctions.

=== Late 19th century ===
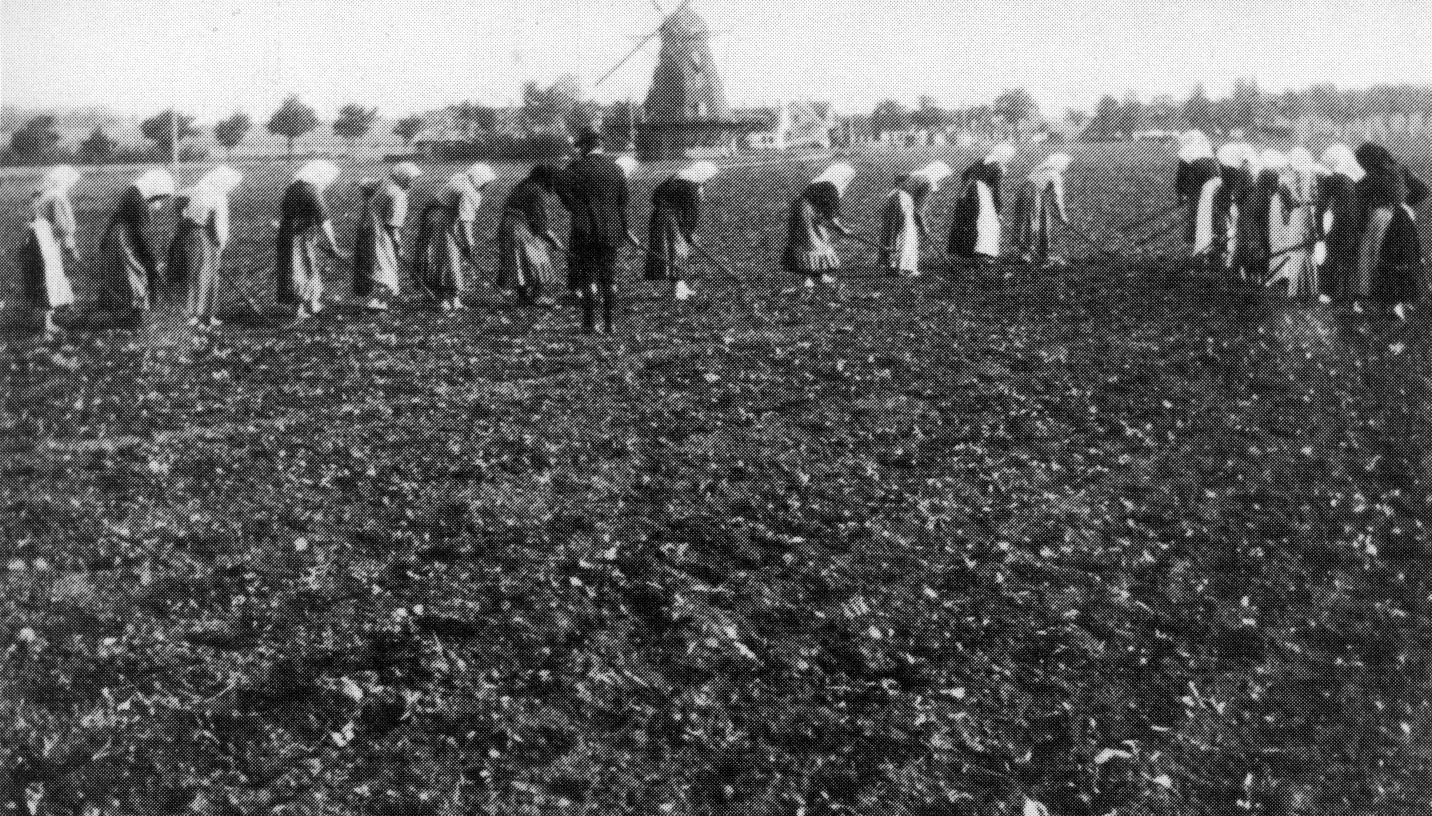
Female laborers at a late-19th-century Swedish sugar beet plantation. Sugar production remained non-mechanized and labor-intensive with low wages throughout the 19th century, fuelling the workers' dream of American opportunity and modern agricultural machinery.

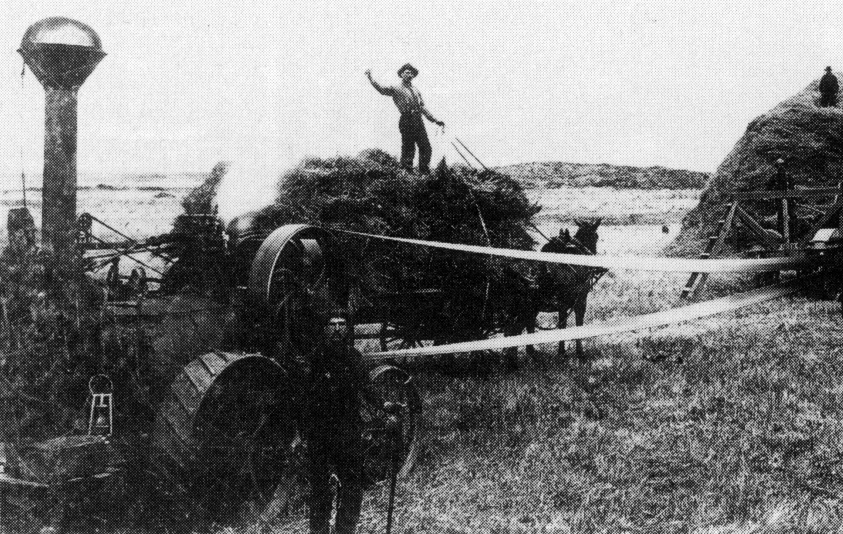
Steam-driven threshing machine near Hallock, Minnesota, 1882

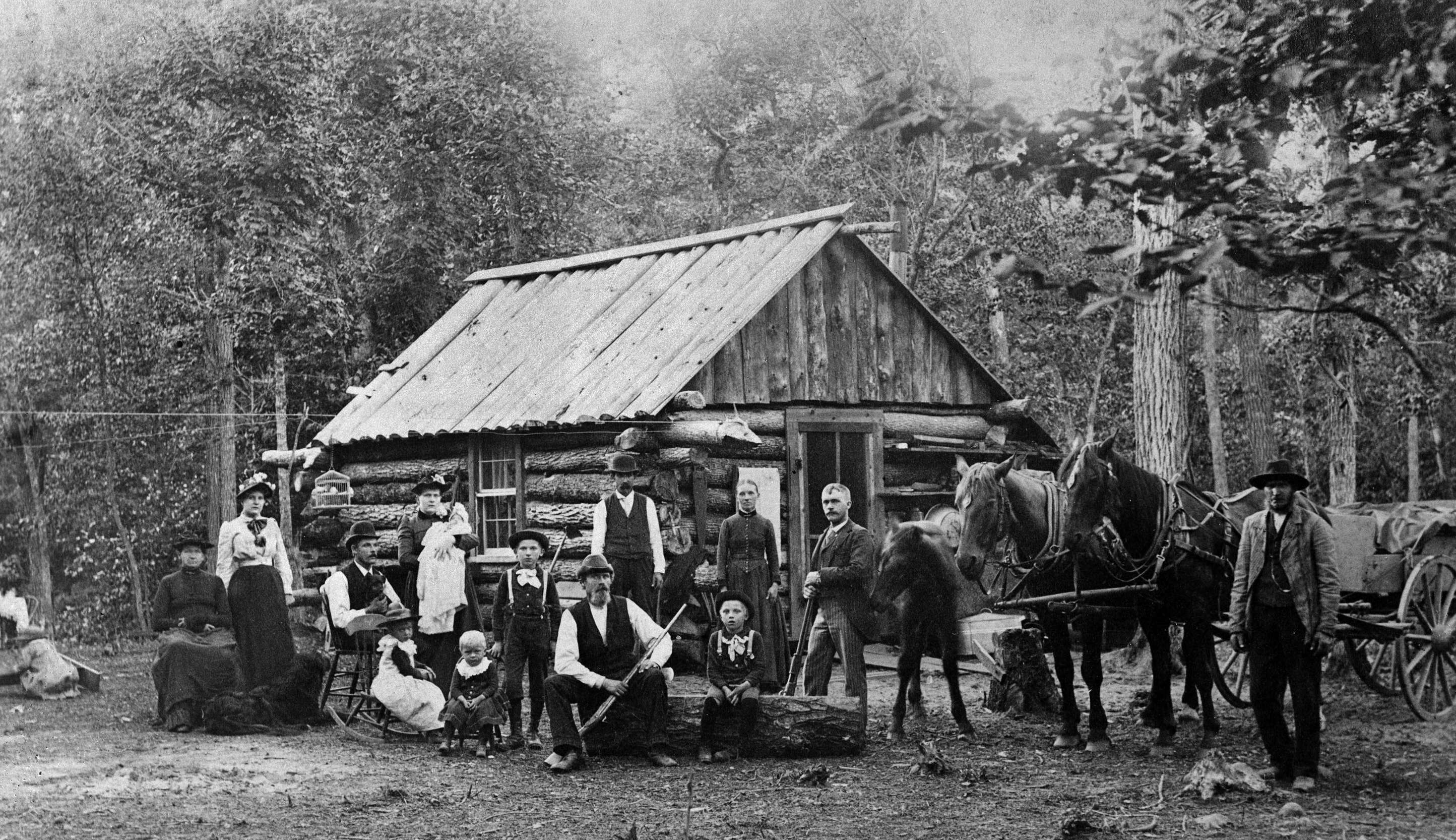
Swedish immigrants in Rush City, Minnesota, in 1887. Olof Olsson emigrated from Nerikes kil in 1880.

Swedish emigration to the United States reached its height in the 1870–1900 era. The size of the Swedish-American community in 1865 is estimated at 25,000 people, a figure soon to be surpassed by the yearly Swedish immigration. By 1890, the U.S. census reported a Swedish-American population of nearly 800,000, with immigration peaking in 1869 and again in 1887. Most of this influx settled in the North. The great majority of them had been peasants in the old country, pushed away from Sweden by disastrous crop failures and pulled towards the United States by the cheap land resulting from the 1862 Homestead Act. Most immigrants became pioneers, clearing and cultivating the virgin land of the Midwest and extending the pre-Civil War settlements further west, into Kansas and Nebraska. Once sizable Swedish farming communities had formed on the prairie, the greatest impetus for further peasant migration came through personal contacts. The iconic "America-letter" to relatives and friends at home spoke directly from a position of trust and shared background, carrying immediate conviction. At the height of migration, familial America-letters could lead to chain reactions which would all but depopulate some Swedish parishes, dissolving tightly knit communities which then re-assembled in the Midwest.

Other forces worked to push the new immigrants towards the cities, particularly Chicago. According to historian H. Arnold Barton, the cost of crossing the Atlantic dropped by more than half between 1865 and 1890, which led to progressively poorer Swedes contributing a growing share of immigration (but compare Brattne and Åkerman, see "Crossing the Atlantic" above). The new immigrants were increasingly younger and unmarried. With the shift from family to individual immigration came a faster and fuller Americanization, as young, single individuals with little money took whatever jobs they could get, often in cities. Large numbers even of those who had been farmers in the old country made straight for American cities and towns, living and working there at least until they had saved enough capital to marry and buy farms of their own. A growing proportion stayed in urban centers, combining emigration with the flight from the countryside which was happening in the homeland and all across Europe.

Single young women, most commonly moved straight from field work in rural Sweden to jobs as live-in housemaids in the urban United States. "Literature and tradition have preserved the often tragic image of the pioneer immigrant wife and mother", writes Barton, "bearing her burden of hardship, deprivation and longing on the untamed frontier ... More characteristic among the newer arrivals, however, was the young, unmarried woman ... As domestic servants in America, they ... were treated as members of the families they worked for and like 'ladies' by American men, who showed them a courtesy and consideration to which they were quite unaccustomed at home." They found employment easily, as Scandinavian maids were in high demand, and learned the language and customs quickly. Working conditions were far better than in Sweden, in terms of wages, hours of work, benefits, and ability to change positions. In contrast, newly arrived Swedish men were often employed in all-Swedish work gangs. The young women usually married Swedish men and brought with them in marriage an enthusiasm for ladylike, American manners and middle-class refinements. Many admiring remarks are recorded from the late 19th century about the sophistication and elegance that simple Swedish farm girls would gain in a few years, and about their unmistakably American demeanor.

As ready workers, the Swedes were generally welcomed by the Americans, who often singled them out as the "best" immigrants. There was no significant anti-Swedish nativism of the sort that attacked Irish, German and, especially, Chinese newcomers. The Swedish style was more familiar: "They are not peddlers, nor organ grinders, nor beggars; they do not sell ready-made clothing nor keep pawn shops", wrote the Congregational missionary M. W. Montgomery in 1885; "they do not seek the shelter of the American flag merely to introduce and foster among us ... socialism, nihilism, communism ... they are more like Americans than are any other foreign peoples."

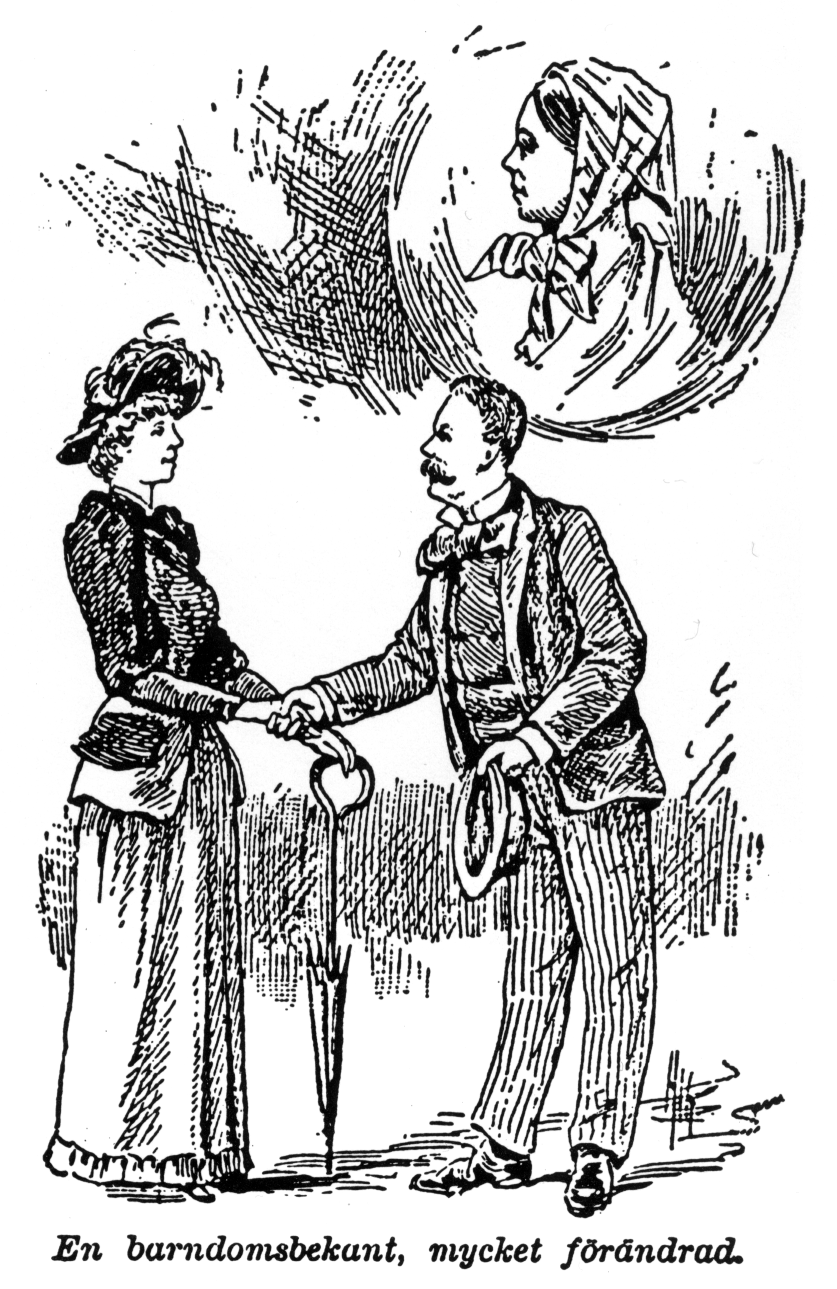
"A childhood acquaintance, much changed": the simple young Swedish peasant women's rapid growth in sophistication in the United States.

A number of well-established and longtime Swedish Americans visited Sweden in the 1870s, making comments that give historians a window on the cultural contrasts involved. A group from Chicago made the journey in an effort to remigrate and spend their later years in the country of their birth, but changed their minds when faced with the realities of 19th-century Swedish society. Uncomfortable with what they described as the social snobbery, pervasive drunkenness, and superficial religious life of the old country, they returned promptly to the United States. The most notable visitor was Hans Mattson (1832–1893), an early Minnesota settler who had served as a colonel in the Union Army and had been Minnesota's secretary of state. He visited Sweden in 1868–69 to recruit settlers on behalf of the Minnesota Immigration Board, and again in the 1870s to recruit for the Northern Pacific Railroad. Viewing Swedish class snobbery with indignation, Mattson wrote in his Reminiscences that this contrast was the key to the greatness of the United States, where "labor is respected, while in most other countries it is looked down upon with slight". He was sardonically amused by the ancient pageantry of monarchy at the ceremonial opening of the Riksdag: "With all respects for old Swedish customs and manners, I cannot but compare this pageant to a great American circus—minus the menagerie, of course."

Mattson's first recruiting visit came immediately after consecutive seasons of crop failure in 1867 and 1868, and he found himself "besieged by people who wished to accompany me back to America." He noted that:

…the laboring and middle classes already at that time had a pretty correct idea of America, and the fate that awaited emigrants there; but the ignorance, prejudice and hatred toward America and everything pertaining to it among the aristocracy, and especially the office holders, was as unpardonable as it was ridiculous. It was claimed by them that all was humbug in America, that it was the paradise of scoundrels, cheats, and rascals, and that nothing good could possibly come out of it.

A more recent American immigrant, Ernst Skarstedt, who visited Sweden in 1885, received the same galling impression of upper-class arrogance and anti-Americanism. The laboring classes, in their turn, appeared to him coarse and degraded, drinking heavily in public, speaking in a stream of curses, making obscene jokes in front of women and children. Skarstedt felt surrounded by "arrogance on one side and obsequiousness on the other, a manifest scorn for menial labor, a desire to appear to be more than one was". This traveller too was incessantly hearing American civilization and culture denigrated from the depths of upper-class Swedish prejudice: "If I, in all modesty, told something about America, it could happen that in reply I was informed that this could not possibly be so or that the matter was better understood in Sweden."

Swedish emigration dropped dramatically after 1890; return migration rose as conditions in Sweden improved. Sweden underwent a rapid industrialization within a few years in the 1890s, and wages rose, principally in the fields of mining, forestry, and agriculture. The pull from the U.S. declined even more sharply than the Swedish "push", as the best farmland was taken. No longer growing but instead settling and consolidating, the Swedish-American community seemed set to become ever more American and less Swedish. The new century, however, saw a new influx.

=== Religious confusion ===
In the 1800s–1900s, the Lutheran State Church supported the Swedish government by opposing both emigration and the clergy's efforts recommending sobriety. This escalated to a point where its priests even were persecuted by the church for preaching sobriety, and the reactions of many congregation members to that contributed to an inspiration to leave the country (which however was against the law until 1840).

== 20th century ==
=== Parliamentary Emigration Commission 1907–1913 ===
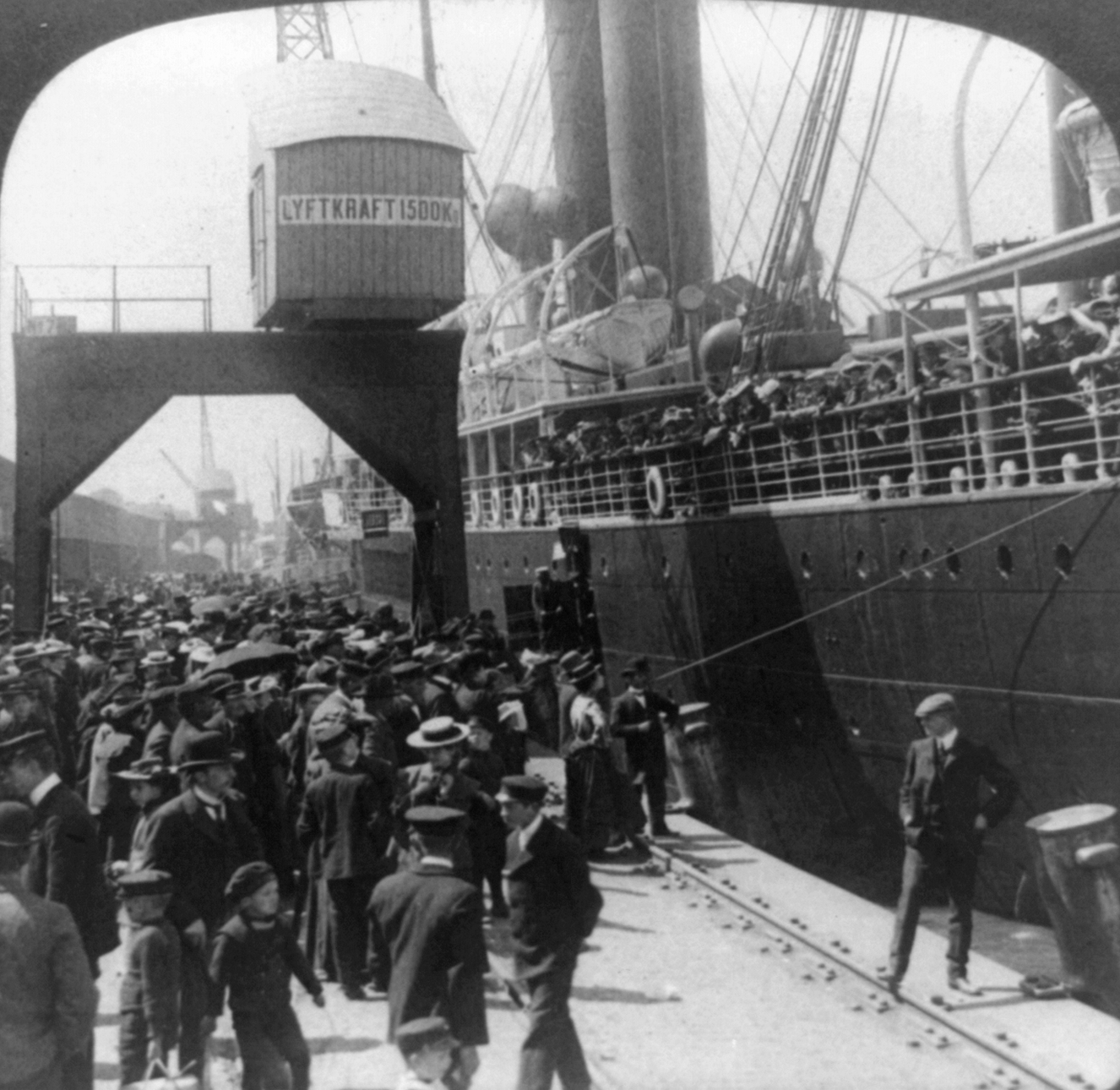
Swedish emigrants boarding a ship in Gothenburg in 1905

Emigration rose again at the turn of the 20th century, reaching a new peak of about 35,000 Swedes in 1903. Figures remained high until World War I, alarming both conservative Swedes, who saw emigration as a challenge to national solidarity, and liberals, who feared the disappearance of the labor force necessary for economic development. One-fourth of all Swedes had made the United States their home, and a broad national consensus mandated that a Parliamentary Emigration Commission study the problem in 1907. Approaching the task with what Barton calls "characteristic Swedish thoroughness", the Commission published its "Emigration Inquest", including findings and proposals, in 21 large volumes. The Commission rejected conservative proposals for legal restrictions on emigration and in the end supported the liberal line of "bringing the best sides of America to Sweden" through social and economic reform. Topping the list of urgent reforms were universal male suffrage, better housing, and general economic development. The Commission especially hoped that broader popular education would counteract "class and caste differences".

Class inequality in Swedish society was a strong and recurring theme in the commission's findings. It appeared as a major motivator in the 289 personal narratives included in the report. These documents, of great research value and human interest today, were submitted by Swedes in Canada and the U.S. in response to requests in Swedish-American newspapers. The great majority of replies expressed enthusiasm for their new homeland and criticized conditions in Sweden. Bitter experiences of Swedish class snobbery still rankled after sometimes 40–50 years in the United States. Writers recalled the hard work, pitiful wages, and grim poverty of life in the Swedish countryside. One woman wrote from North Dakota of how in her Värmland home parish, she had had to earn her living in peasant households from the age of eight, starting work at four in the morning and living on "rotten herring and potatoes, served out in small amounts so that I would not eat myself sick". She could see "no hope of saving anything in case of illness", but rather could see "the poorhouse waiting for me in the distance". When she was seventeen, her emigrated brothers sent her a prepaid ticket to the United States, and "the hour of freedom struck."

The Emigration Inquest, according to Franklin D. Scott, had little effect on emigration. A year after the Commission published its last volume, World War I began and reduced emigration drastically. Despite a slight increase after World War I, the American Immigration Act of 1924 significantly reduced quotas for Swedish immigrants, and by the late 1920s even those quotas were no longer filled. Barton points to the rapid implementation of essentially all the commission's recommendations to improve conditions in Sweden, from industrialization to an array of social reforms, and claims that "its findings must have had a powerful cumulative effect upon Sweden's leadership and broader public opinion".

== Swedish Americans ==
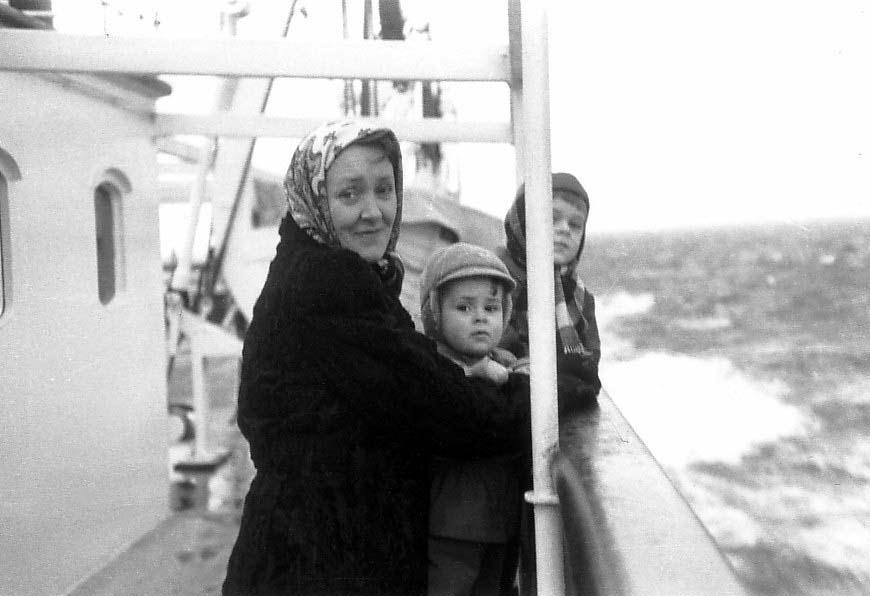
Birgit Ridderstedt and small sons emigrating on the mid-Atlantic, bound for Portland, Maine, and on to Chicago in 1950

The Midwest remained the heartland of the Swedish-American community, but its position weakened in the 20th century: in 1910, 54% of the Swedish immigrants and their children lived in the Midwest, 15% in industrial areas in the East, and 10% on the West Coast. Chicago was effectively the Swedish-American capital, accommodating about 10% of all Swedish Americans—more than 100,000 people—making it the second-largest Swedish city in the world (only Stockholm had more Swedish inhabitants).

Defining themselves as both Swedish and American, the Swedish-American community retained a fascination for the old country and their relationship to it. The nostalgic visits to Sweden which had begun in the 1870s continued well into the 20th century, and narratives from these trips formed a staple of the lively Swedish-American publishing companies. The accounts testify to complex feelings, but each contingent of American travellers were freshly indignant at Swedish class pride and Swedish disrespect for women. It was with renewed pride in American culture that they returned to the Midwest.

Distribution of Swedish Americans in 2000 by county, according to the United States Census

In the 2000 U.S. Census, about four million Americans claimed to have Swedish roots. Minnesota remains by a wide margin the state with the most inhabitants of Swedish descent—9.6% of the population as of 2005.

=== Memory ===
The best-known artistic representation of the Swedish mass migration is the epic four-novel suite The Emigrants (1949–1959) by Vilhelm Moberg (1898–1973). Portraying the lives of an emigrant family through several generations, the novels have sold nearly two million copies in Sweden and have been translated into more than twenty languages. The tetralogy has been filmed by Jan Troell as The Emigrants (1971) and The New Land (1972), and forms the basis of Kristina from Duvemåla, a 1995 musical by former ABBA members Benny Andersson and Björn Ulvaeus.

In Sweden, the "House of Emigrants" (Emigranternas Hus) was founded in Gothenburg, the main port for Swedish emigrants, in 2004. The centre has exhibitions on migration and research on genealogy. In the U.S., there are hundreds of active Swedish-American organizations as of 2007, for which the Swedish Council of America functions as an umbrella group. There are Swedish-American museums in Philadelphia, Chicago, Minneapolis, and Seattle. Rural cemeteries such as the Moline Swedish Lutheran Cemetery in central Texas also serve as a valuable record of the first Swedish people to come to the United States.

== See also ==
- American Swedish Historical Museum
- American Swedish Institute
- Bishop Hill Colony - Large sectarian colony in Illinois with Swedish followers of Eric Janson, established in 1846
- Emihamn – a database of passenger lists from major Swedish ports
- Nordstjernan, Swedish newspaper founded in New York, 1872
- Swedish colonization of the Americas
- Swedish language in the United States
- Swedish-American relations

== Reference bibliography ==
- Akenson, Donald Harman (2011). Ireland, Sweden and the Great European Migration, 1815–1914. McGill-Queens University Press.
- Åkerman, Sune (1976). "Theories and Methods of Migration Research"". In Runblom and Norman (ed.). From Sweden to America. pp. 19–75.
- American FactFinder, United States Census, 2000. Consulted 30 June 2007.
- Barton, H. Arnold (1994). A Folk Divided: Homeland Swedes and Swedish Americans, 1840–1940. Carbondale and Edwardsville: Southern Illinois University Press. ISBN 9780809319435.
- Barton, H. Arnold (1996). Swedish America in Fifty Years—2050. Swedish American Historical Society. Archived from the original on 4 August 2007.
- Barton, H. Arnold (2007). The Old Country and the New. SIU Press. pp. 38–39. ISBN 9780809389506.
- Beijbom, Ulf. "Chicago, the Essence of the Promised Land". Swedish Emigrant Institute. Archived from the original on 6 October 2013.
- Beijbom, Ulf (1996). "European Emigration: A Review of Swedish Emigration to America". American West. Archived from the original on 2 June 2006.
- Brattne, Berit; Åkerman, Sune (1976). "The Importance of the Transport Sector for Mass Emigration". In Runblom and Norman (ed.). From Sweden to America. pp. 176–200.
- Carlsson, Sten (1995). "The New Sweden Colonists, 1628-1656: Their Geographical and Social Background". In Hoffecker, Carol E. (ed.). New Sweden in America. University of Delaware Press. pp. 171–87. ISBN 9780874135206.
- Cipolla, Carlo (1966). Literacy and Development in the West. Harmondsworth.
- Colenbrander, H. T. (1925). Koloniale Geschiedenis (in Dutch). Vol. 2. The Hague: Martinus Nijhoff.
- Elovson, Harald (1930). Amerika i svensk litteratur 1750–1820 (in Swedish). Lund.
- Glynn, Irial (2011). "Emigration Across the Atlantic: Irish, Italians and Swedes compared, 1800–1950". European History Online. Mainz: Institute of European History.
- Fur, Gunlög (2006). Colonialism in the Margins: Cultural Encounters in New Sweden and Lapland. Brill. ISBN 9789047410652.
- Gritsch, Eric W. (2002). A History of Lutheranism. Minneapolis: Fortress Press. ISBN 9780800634728.
- Gustafson, Anita Olson (2018). Swedish Chicago: The Shaping of an Immigrant Community, 1880-1920. Ithaca: Cornell University Press. ISBN 978-1-60909-246-7. OCLC 1129197373.
- Gustafson, David M. (2008). D.L. Moody and Swedes: shaping evangelical identity among Swedish mission friends, 1867-1899 (PDF). Linköping University, Department of culture and communication. ISBN 9789173939959. OCLC 489777085.
- Lintelman, Joy K. (2009). I Go to America: Swedish American Women and the Life of Mina Anderson. Minnesota Historical Society. ISBN 978-0873516365.
- Hoerder, Dirk (2015). "Historical Perspectives on Domestic and Care-Giving Workers' Migrations: A Global Approach". In Hoerder, Dirk; van Nederveen Meerkerk, Elise; Neunsinger, Silke (eds.). Towards a Global History of Domestic and Caregiving Workers. Brill. pp. 61–109. ISBN 978-9004280144.
- Kälvemark, Ann-Sofie (1976). "Swedish Emigration Policy in an International Perspective, 1840–1925". In Runblom and Norman (ed.). From Sweden to America. pp. 94–113.
- Nausner, Michael (October 2000). "Swedish Methodists in America and their quest for identity" (PDF). Methodist History. 39 (1).
- Norman, Hans (1976). "The Causes of Emigration". In Runblom and Norman (ed.). From Sweden to America. pp. 149–164.
- Pehrson, Lennart (2014). Den nya världen. Utvandringen till Amerika (I) (in Swedish). Stockholm: Albert Bonniers Förlag. ISBN 978-91-0-013191-3. OCLC 880134785.
- Runblom, Harald; Norman, Hans, eds. (1976). From Sweden to America: A History of the Migration. Minneapolis: University of Minnesota Press.
- Scott, Franklin D. (1965). "Sweden's Constructive Opposition to Emigration". Journal of Modern History. 37 (3): 307–335. doi:10.1086/600692. JSTOR 1875405. S2CID 144459398.
- The Swedish Emigrant Institute. Consulted 30 June 2007.
- Swenson Center, a research institute at Augustana College, Illinois. Consulted 7 May 2007.
- Weaver, C. Douglas (2008). In Search of the New Testament Church: The Baptist Story. Macon, Georgia: Mercer University Press. ISBN 9780881461060. OCLC 180752918.
- Westin, Gunnar. "Lars Paul Esbjörn". Svenskt Biografiskt Lexikon (in Swedish).
