= Beggar regulation of 1642 =

Beggar regulation of 1642 (Swedish: 1642 års tiggareordning) was a Swedish Poor Law which organized the public Poor relief in the Sweden. The regulations of the law, with some alterations, was in effect until the Poor relief regulation of 1847

In the Middle Ages, poor care in Sweden was traditionally handled through the rotegångsystem in the country side, and by the poor houses of the church in the cities, a system which was kept after the Swedish Reformation, though the responsibility was formally (though not in practice) transferred from the church to the civil authorities (as the church itself became owned by the state).

The regulation of 1642 stated that the every parish were responsible for their own paupers. Every parish should have a poor house for old and sick people, and an orphanage for children, financed by the parish church collection. If such facilities did not exist in the parish (and in rural communities, they seldom did, except for the occasional backstuga), then the paupers should either be housed with the parishioners in accordance with the established traditional rotegångsystem, or be given a beggar permit, legal only in their own parish: all other forms of beggary were banned.

The 1642 regulation were given some complements and smaller alterations, but it remained as the ground for the poor care system in Sweden until the Poor relief regulation of 1847

== See also ==
- Welfare in Sweden
