= Swedish famine of 1867–1869 =

- Country: Sweden
- Period: 1867–1869
- Total deaths: 10,000
- Causes: cold weather, drought, poor harvests
- Consequences: increased Swedish emigration to the United States

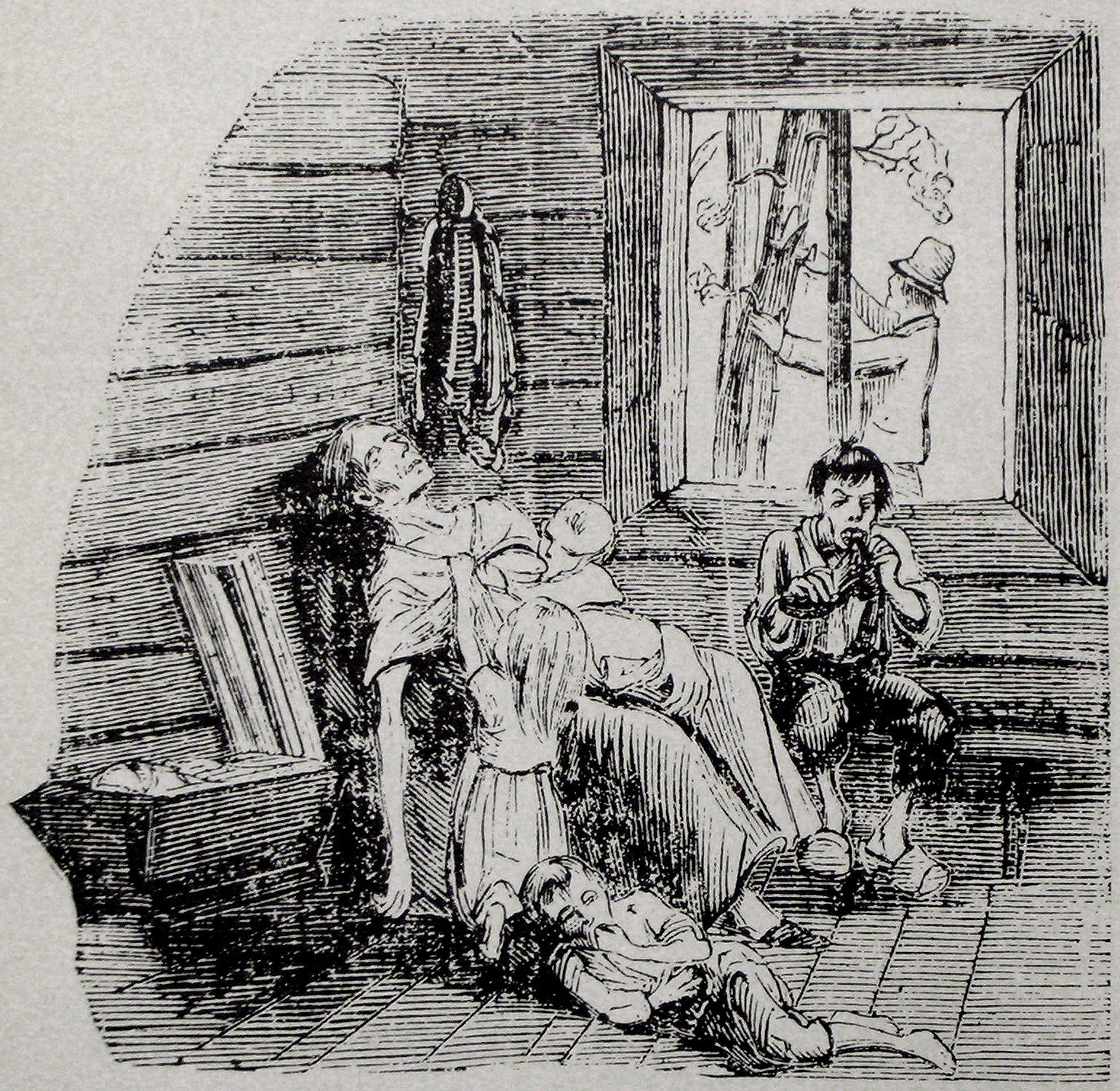
Illustration of starvation in northern Sweden, Famine of 1867–1868.

The Famine of 1867–1869 was the last famine in Sweden, and, together with the Finnish famine of 1866–1868, the last major famine in Northern Europe.

In Sweden, the year 1867 was known as Storsvagåret ('The Year of Great Weakness') and, in Tornedalen, as Lavåret ('The Lichen Year') because of the bark bread made of lichen. Although brought about by poor harvests, the famine was worsened by work requirements to receive aid and the continuation of cereal exports to Great Britain. It contributed to the great rush of Swedish emigration to the United States.

== Causes ==
During the 1860s, Sweden had suffered poor harvests and frost shocks on several occasions. The spring and summer of 1867 were much colder than usual all over Sweden. In Burträsk, for example, it was not possible to start sowing before Midsummer: snow was still left in June. The late spring was followed by a very short summer and an early autumn. This caused not just bad harvests, but also made it difficult to feed the cattle. The consequence was rising food prices. This caused famine in some counties in northern Sweden, including Västerbotten County. Because early ice and snow disturbed communications, it was hard to transport and distribute emergency food supplies to the starving areas. A widespread drought occurred in 1868, which caused a failed harvest and starving animals. Thus, the famine continued.

== Actions ==
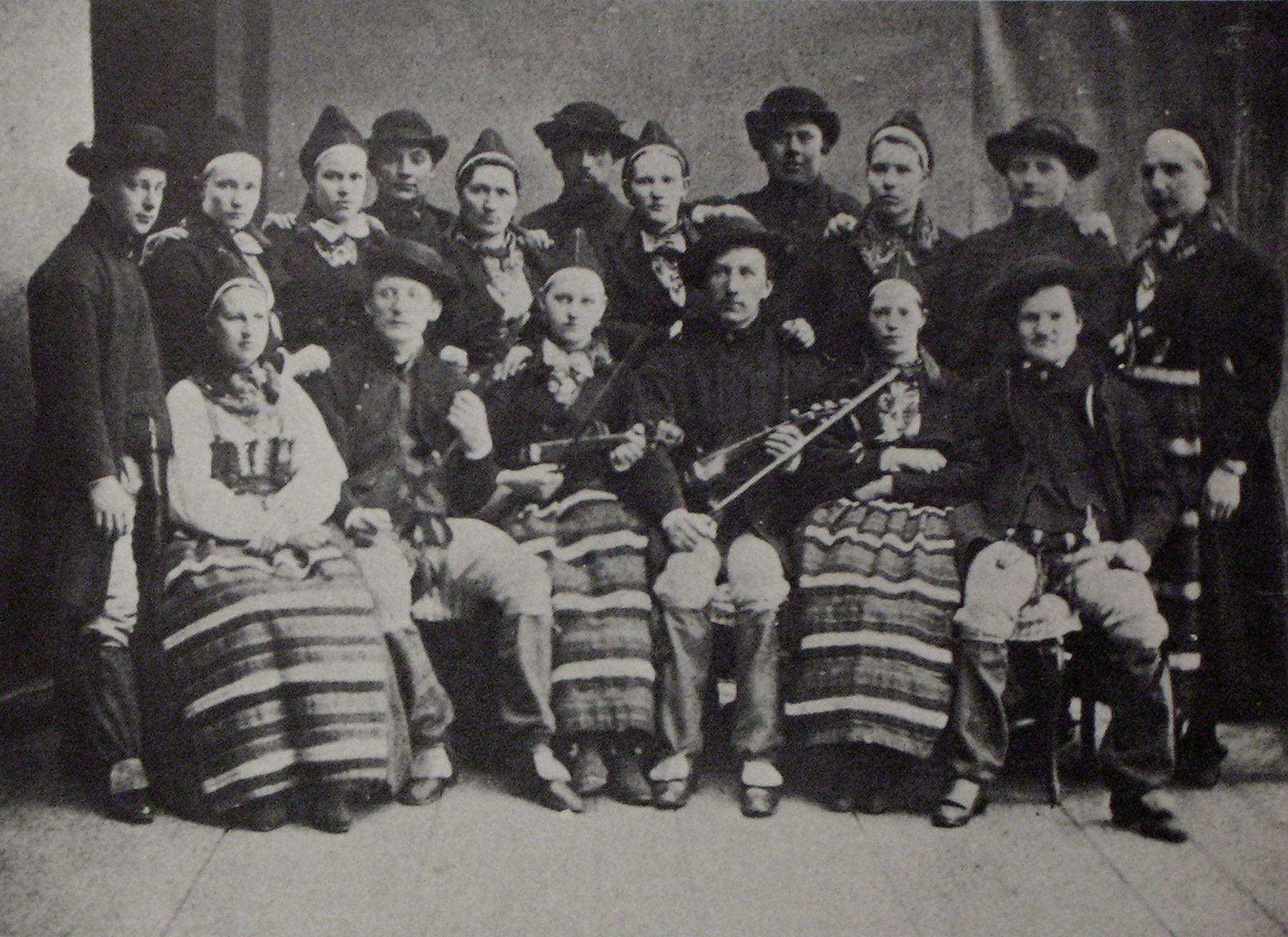
A Charity play organized in favor of the famine victims, Sweden, 1867.

In the autumn of 1867, the government of Sweden granted emergency loans to the Northern counties, and the county governors were given permission and encouraged to establish emergency committees (Swedish: undsättningskomitté) to collect the funds needed from volunteers and philanthropists. Furthermore, two central emergency committees were created by the government: one located in the capital of Stockholm and the second in Gothenburg. The press published appeals for funds to help the needy, and charity concerts, charity plays and other similar events were hosted to collect money to pay for emergency help to the victims of the famine. Funds from outside Sweden were also contributed both from Europe and America (see table). In fact, the foreign contributions were reportedly about as large as those from inside the country. Among the contributors from outside Sweden was Jenny Lind, with a sum of 500 kronor, and John Ericsson with a sum of 20,000 kronor (equivalent to 1,020,000 kronor in 2009).

Helping country	Help provided in rmt. rdr.
Sweden	263,235
Denmark	80,435
Germany	75,628
Norway	63,891
England	51,437
America	36,453
Holland	6,800
Russia	3,857
Italy	1,000
France	817
Portugal	180
Spain	39
Unknown (foreign)	12

The help from the emergency committees was distributed by the local city councils. Formally, the Poor Care Regulation of 1847, which was in effect at this time, was quite liberal, and would provide help for all who needed it. In reality, however, the emergency help was severely restricted by regulations imposed by the authorities and the elite in opposition to the law, which had come to be regarded as too liberal (it was in fact to be replaced soon after by the strict Poor Care Regulation of 1871).

The terms to receive help was not merely starvation: a starvation victim would have to be willing to work to receive help, otherwise they would not be given help. An exception was made for people who were physically unable to work, such as invalids and the elderly, but the regulations stipulated that only 10 percent of the emergency help was allowed to be spent on "charity", while the rest was only to be distributed to people willing to work in exchange. Therefore, work such as road construction and home production of various form of handicraft objects were organized to give people in need of the emergency help an opportunity to work for it. In practice, these work tasks were meant as a symbolic demonstration that the government would only help those willing to work and be productive.

Relief policies placed stringent work requirements on receiving aid. Everyone who was not elderly, disabled, or a child, had to work to receive aid. These work requirements were motivated by the Protestant work ethic. Monetary aid was given in the form of loans instead of aid. In the 19th century, the Church of Sweden and committees of the poor looked down on the lower classes, holding, according to Katharina Rahnert, a “negative view" of them that often entailed them being slothful and deserving of poverty. She argues that there was a social perception that wealthy donors, in helping those who did not deserve it, were enhancing their own morality.

The local city councils were criticized for enforcing the principle of help in exchange for work so far that most of the needy were left without help. An example of this abuse occurred in the parish of Grundsunda kommun in Ångermanland, where no one who could not offer Surety was given help. The local governor, Per Grundström, described in the distribution of help in the press: "A great mass of beggars and paupers could not be given anything. Torp-dwellers and other undesirables were in fact left without much at all." The authorities recommended that the starving people should eat Bark bread made of lichen rather than expect great amounts of flour in relief help. Some of the local emergency committees, such as the one in Härnösand, mixed the flour with lichen and had it baked to bread before distributing it. This bread, however, caused chest pains and, in children, vomiting. Flour aid was secretly mixed with bark.

== Aftermath and resulting emigration ==
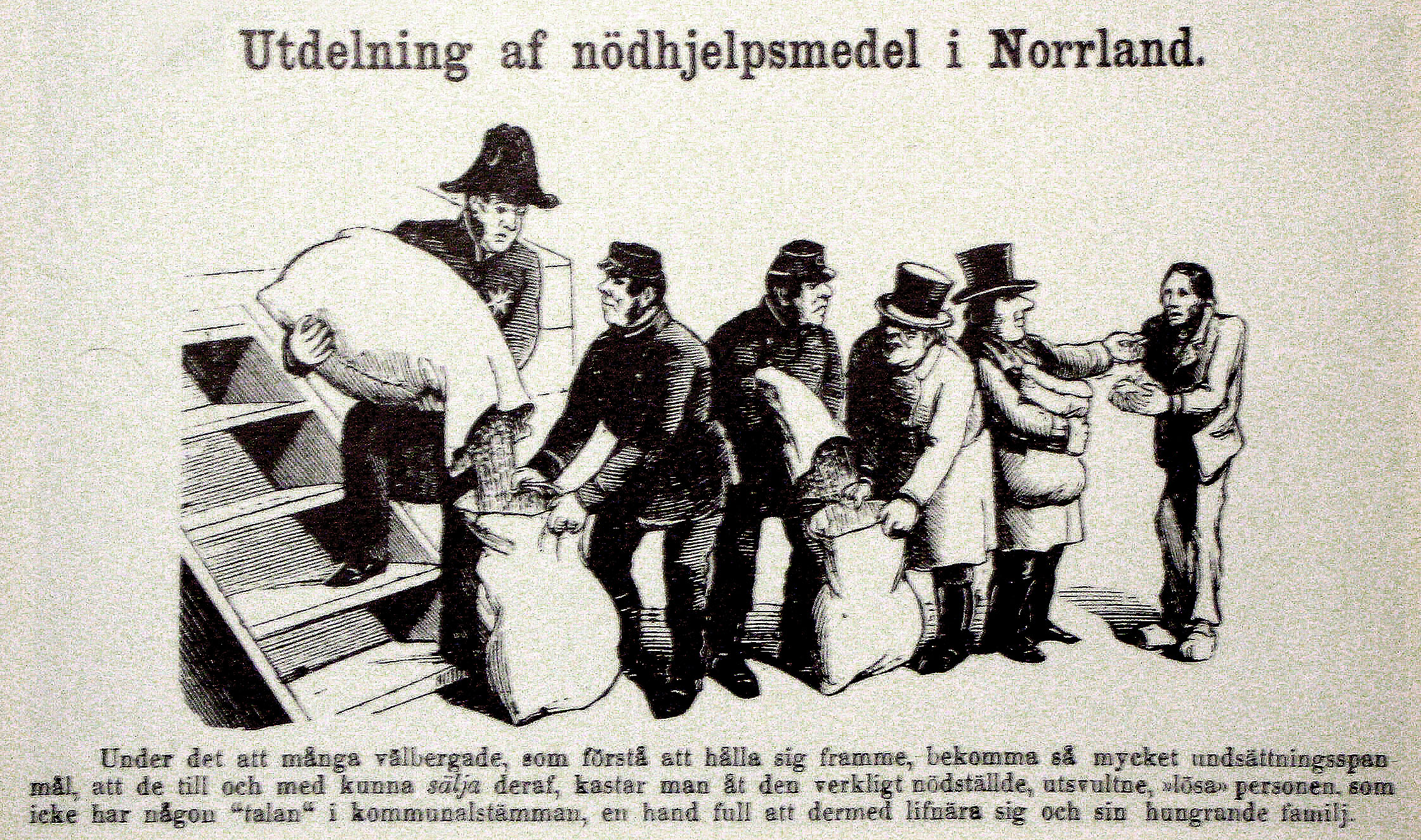
Caricature from the paper Fäderneslandet 14 December 1867, criticizing the unjust distribution of the relief help committees: the relief help are given first to county governor, and are thereafter given first to the wealthy officials and rich farmers and last, when only an handful is left, to the poor people truly in need.

The authorities were exposed to harsh criticism from the press because of how ineffectively the relief funds from the emergency committees were distributed, and on which terms. Notably the paper Fäderneslandet voiced its anger at the fact that those most in need of help were left without because of the unwillingness of the authorities to compromise the principle of help in exchange for work, a regulation the paper described as "quasi philosophical thoughts about the value of work".

There was widespread criticism focused on the belief that the famine in Sweden was caused by unjust distribution. This is supported by the fact that the year of 1867 was in fact a successful year for the Swedish cereal exports: the largest of the farms and estates in Sweden exported their harvests, mostly oats, to Great Britain, where it was used for horse drawn buses in London.

As a result of deprivation from the famine, thefts tripled and murders doubled. In 1865, most Swedes still lived in rural areas, subsisting on agriculture, while only eleven percent worked in manufacturing. This meant most Swedes were directly affected. The famine also saw a decrease in gross domestic product.

The Final Report of the Stockholm Relief Committee had sixty-five pages about its donors, but only two about the aid sent to Norrland. There was no information about the impact, outcomes, nor lives saved, even though it would have been possible for them to gather these statistics.

There was also a fact that authorities had elected to impose a stricter interpretation than the Poor Care Regulation of 1847 would have allowed, thus making the famine worse than it needed to be. The 1847 law was replaced a few years after the famine by the very strict Poor Care Regulation of 1871, which followed the strict practice of distribution made by the elite during the famine.

The great famine of 1867–68, and the distrust and discontent over the way the authorities handled the relief help to the needy, is estimated to have contributed greatly to Swedish emigration to the United States, which was spurred by the famine. Overall, an estimated 1.25 million Swedes emigrated to the USA from the 1860s to the 1920s.

A 2019 study found that emigration from Sweden to the USA positively affected, in Sweden, unions, labor organizing, and the electoral successes of leftist parties. As there were fewer adult workers because of emigration, the workers who stayed had more bargaining power over their bosses. Elites were also incentivized to improve living conditions through welfare in order to discourage more workers from emigrating to the USA.

Emigration’s effect on political and labor organizing extended down to the municipalities, and leftist parties won higher vote shares in municipalities that had higher emigration. Social Democratic victories in municipalities were aided by their collaboration with local groups like unions. Furthermore, the researchers found a “…positive effects on turnout, with an estimate indicating that a 10 percent increase in emigration increases the voter turnout by approximately 0.8 percentage points, from an average of 60 percent during the period.” In 1910, an average of ninety percent of municipal income came from municipal taxes, which were progressive, and about twenty percent of municipal budgets were spent on welfare for the unemployed, disabled, elderly, and widows. Average municipal spending on welfare in 1918 was 2.42 kronor (1918 value), while for municipalities with higher emigration, welfare expenditures were 1.1 kronor higher than the average. Municipalities with higher emigration were also more innovative (measured by the number of patents) and had higher wages.

== In fiction and media ==
- Svälten: Hungeråren som formade Sverige, a non-fiction book which describes the famine

== See also ==
- Great Famine of 1695–1697
- List of famines
- Russian famine of 1601–03
