= Mellgren =

Mellgren is a surname. Notable people with the surname include:

- Dagny Mellgren (born 1978), Norwegian footballer
- Hulda Mellgren (1839–1918), Swedish industrialist
- Linnea Mellgren (born 1989), Swedish figure skater
- Sten Mellgren (1900–1989), Swedish football (soccer) player
