= Welfare in Sweden =

Swedish welfare policies

Social welfare in Sweden is made up of several organizations and systems dealing with welfare. It is mostly funded by taxes, and executed by the public sector on all levels of government as well as private organizations. It can be separated into three parts falling under three different ministries. Social welfare is the responsibility of the Ministry of Health and Social Affairs. Education is the responsibility of the Ministry of Education and Research. The labour market is the responsibility of the Ministry of Employment.

== History ==
The modern Swedish welfare system was preceded by the poor relief organized by the Church of Sweden. This was formalized in the Beggar Law of 1642, and became mandatory in the Civil Code of 1734, when each parish was required to have an almshouse.

This system was changed with the Poor Law of 1847, when the first national poor care system separate from the church was organized: a mandatory public poor care relief fund financed by the public was established in each parish (after 1862 municipality), managed by a public Board of directors for poor relief, and the church was no longer directly involved (though the parish vicar was always to be given a place in the board), transferring the poor care from the church to the state. In the reformed Poor Law of 1871, however, the criteria of whom was eligible to receive benefits was severely restricted to include only orphans, the aged and the invalids, and in parallel, the system was complemented by old customs such as rotegång, child auction, fattigauktion and by private charity (foremost the local Fruntimmers-skyddsförening). This system was in place until 1918.

In the 19th century, private sick benefit societies were started, and in 1891, they became regulated and subsidized. The Liberal Party government passed the National Pension Act in 1913 to provide security for the aged and in 1934 the private unemployment societies were regulated and subsidized in a way similar to the sick benefit societies.

The Poor Care law of 1918 replaced the law of 1871, transformed the old fashion poor care law to a more humane modern social welfare system and abolished a number of old outdated customs, such as rotegång, Child auction and fattigauktion, and transformed the old poor houses to retirement homes. The final transformation of the old poor care system to a modern social welfare system was the Social Help Law of 1956 (Lagen (1956:2) om socialhjälp)

In 1944, free medical exams, inoculations and other services were introduced for all schoolchildren. In 1946, a National Pension Act was introduced that provided that all citizens at the age of 67 would receive (as noted by one study) "the same pension regardless of previous income or taxes paid." The law also provided disability payments and survivor's benefits for wives, husbands and young children, and also established periodic adjustments to changes in living costs.

In 1961 the private sick benefit societies were replaced with county-level public insurance societies who also handled pensions. The independent and mostly union-run unemployment benefit societies has been more centrally regulated and levels are now regulated by the government.

== Social welfare ==
The Ministry of Health and Social Affairs is responsible for welfare. This is defined as social security in the case of illness, old age and for the family; social services; health care; promotion of health and children's rights; individual help for persons with disabilities and coordination of the national disability policies.

=== Health care ===
Sweden's entire population has equal access to the public health care services. The Swedish health care system is publicly funded and decentralized. The 21 regions are responsible for financing and providing primary and specialist health care, while the 290 municipalities are responsible for elderly care and support for people with disabilities.

The health care providers of the public system are generally owned by the regions, although private providers are common. Since the introduction of the Act on System of Choice in the Public Sector (LOV) in 2009, all regions are mandated to allow private providers to establish primary care practices with public reimbursement.

Dental care is not quite as subsidized as other health care, and the dentists decide on their own treatment prices. Nevertheless, by 1950, state subsidies were paid to municipalities for dental care for less well-off and indigent persons, who could receive a contribution from the relevant municipality towards their dental fees. In 1967, adults paid for dental care according to a modest fee schedule, but in general hospitals that contained dental clinics adults received free treatment.

=== Elderly care ===
Elderly care in Sweden is a universal, publicly funded system delivering social and medical support to older adults. Elderly care is mainly regulated by the Social Services Act (SoL) of 2001. It emphasises the right to assistance based on need rather than income or family obligations, and supports older individuals to remain independent and to be included in society. This aligns with the universalist welfare model, relieving families (such as adult children) from legal caretaking responsibilities.

=== Social security ===
The Swedish social security is mainly handled by the Swedish Social Insurance Agency and encompasses many separate benefits. The major ones are:

- "Barnbidrag": Monetary support for children up to 16 (support also available for older students)
- "Föräldrapenning": Benefits to be able to be home from work to take care of their children for up to 480 days per child. It also includes special benefits to care about sick and disabled children.
- "Bostadsbidrag": Housing allowances for anyone who otherwise can't afford housing.
- "Sjukpenning", "Sjukersättning", "Aktivitetsersättning" and "Handikappersättning": Benefits if you are ill or disabled and can't work.
- "Arbetslöshetsersättning": Benefits for unemployed (time limited to 300 days, five days a week, which means 60 weeks)
- "Ålderspension", "Garantipension": Benefits for those who have retired.
- "Försörjningsstöd": Benefits for anyone (and their children) who otherwise can't get a reasonable standard of living. This is given out purely on a need-basis and handled by each municipality's social service.

=== Welfare fraud ===
In its 2017, police stated that welfare fraud was prevalent in vulnerable areas, where benefits administered by Swedish Public Employment Service and the Swedish Social Insurance Agency were targeted. Police had identified resident registry figures that had been manipulated: for instance, 2% of all apartments in Rinkeby had between 10 and 30 persons registered as residents, which led to an inflated number of people receiving welfare benefits.

The tolerance of fraud of the social welfare system generally decreases with high unemployment and low economic growth. A 1998 study stated that that tendency also applied to Sweden.

== Education ==
Education is the responsibility of the Ministry of Education and Research. Education responsibilities includes pre-school and child care for school children as well as adult education. Education, including any university degree, is free in Sweden.

== Labour market ==
The labour market policies fall under the responsibilities of the Ministry of Employment. The responsibilities considered to be a part of the welfare system includes unemployment benefits, activation benefits, employment services, employment programs, job and development guarantees, starter jobs, and the European Social Fund. Sweden has state-supported union unemployment funds.

== See also ==
- Million Programme
- Tilläggspension
- Nordic model
- 1642 års tiggareordning
- 1847 års fattigvårdförordning

General:

- Social model
- Constitutional economics
