= Stockholms Allmänna Skyddsförening =

Swedish charity organisation

Stockholms Allmänna Skyddsförening (literary: 'Stockholm Public Protection Society') was a Swedish charity organization in Stockholm, founded in 1866.

Following the foundation of the Women's Charitable Society in 1819, numerous charitable societies were founded all over Sweden. These were commonly referred to as fruntimmers-skyddsföreningar ('Women's protection societies') because they were founded and managed by (rich) women. They were founded with the equivalent women's charitable societies in Germany as role models, with the common thought to offer secular charity without using it to enforce religion upon the poor.

These fruntimmers-skyddsföreningar eventually existed in almost every city and town, and in 1858 the duchess of Östergötland founded her own local fruntimmers-skyddsförening for the area of Kungsholm in Stockholm. In 1866, the Kungsholm Protection Society united all the other local Protection Societies in Stockholm to one central organisation named the Stockholm Public Protection Society.

The Society collaborated with the authorities and acted as a channel between the private charitable societies and the Communal Poor Help of the state which had been introduced in Sweden in the Poor Help Law of 1847. They provided temporary monetary assistance as well as acting as employment agencies and housing agencies. From 1867, they were given financial support from the city council. Their work was important as a complement to the social help provided by the state, because after the introduction of the Poor Help Law of 1871, the communal and state authorities could no longer give any assistance to any poor people except the physically or mentally challenged, the aged or children, so all the other in need of assistance were referred to private charities, notably the Stockholms Allmänna Skyddsförening or its equivalent local fruntimmers-skyddsförening, as most cities and towns had one.
