= 1915 in Sweden =

- Decades: 1890s; 1900s; 1910s; 1920s; 1930s
- See also: Other events of 1915; Timeline of Swedish history

Events from the year 1915 in Sweden

== Incumbents ==
- Monarch – Gustaf V
- Prime Minister - Hjalmar Hammarskjöld

== Events ==
- 6 February - Federation of Swedish Farmers is founded.

== Births ==
- 4 April – Lars Ahlin, novelist and (died 1997)
- 29 August – Ingrid Bergman, film actress (died 1982 in the United Kingdom)

== Deaths ==
- 23 January – Sofia Gumaelius, businessperson (born 1840)
- 2 June – Ingeborg Rönnblad, actress (born 1873)
- 7 June – Hilda Sjölin, photographer (born 1835)
- 15 June – Eugène Jansson, painter (born 1842)
- 4 October – Karl Staaff, prime minister (born 1860)
