= Poor relief regulation of 1847 =

Swedish poverty law

The Poor relief regulation of 1847 (Swedish: 1847 års fattigvårdförordning) was a Swedish Poor Law which organized the public poor relief system in Sweden. With some alterations in 1853 and 1871, it established the basis for the poor relief system until the Poor Care Law of 1918 was passed.

== History ==
The law replaced the 1642 års tiggareordning which had previously regulated the public poor relief system. At the time the 1847 reform was enacted, care for the poor was largely organized in the traditional rotegång system, administered by the church.

The 1847 regulation established a public board of directors for poor relief in each parish. Though the church was no longer directly involved, the vicar in each parish was to be given a seat on the board. The law also made it mandatory to contribute to the parish poor fund. The ban for paupers who received benefits to move to another parish was also lifted, and the right of the parish to refuse a pauper (not born in the parish) to settle in the parish was abolished.

The Poor Care Board had the task of granting benefits to the needy and arranging a place in a poor house. If the community did not have a poor house, the board was responsible for arranging housing for the pauper with a parishioner and paying the benefits to the parishioner. The pauper's hosts had the legal right to demand household work of their tenant benefactors, a practice that had been customary in the rotegång system. The benefactors were also allowed to file complaints of abuse.

The traditional rotegång system was kept in force as a parallel system for adult paupers, but it was abolished for children. This ban on rotegång for children, who were to be placed in foster homes by the poor care board, lead to pauper actions becoming more common for children. The new law had the effect that children were often placed in foster homes with the parishioners who had made the lowest 'bid' for a stipend.

The poor relief regulation of 1847 was not changed much by the new act of 1853 (1853 års fattigvårdförordning). The law eventually came to be regarded as too liberal and generous. By the time of the Swedish famine of 1867–1869, the law had come to be interpreted very strictly, and it was replaced shortly thereafter. The poor relief regulation of 1871 (1871 års fattigvårdförordning), though it largely kept the form and provisions of the 1847 regulation, severely diminished the applicability of the law. Only the elderly, children, invalids and the insane were granted benefits under this law. It was not until the Poor Care Law of 1918 (1918 års fattigvårdslag) that the entire poor relief system in Sweden was truly reformed. Among its provisions, the 1918 law abolished the rotegång system, pauper auctions, child auctions, and poor houses.

== See also ==
- Welfare in Sweden
