= Poor Relief Regulation of 1871 =

Poor Relief Regulation of 1871 (Swedish: 1871 års fattigvårdförordning) was a Swedish Poor Law which organized the public Poor relief in the Sweden. It replaced the 1847 års fattigvårdförordning and was in effect until the Poor Care Law of 1918.

In 1847, the first Swedish social help system separate from the church had been organized by the Poor relief regulation of 1847. It was adjusted only to a very minor degree by the 1853 års fattigvårdförordning.

The rapid changes during the mid 19th-century, including industrialisation, urbanization, labour movement and socialism, created an opposition toward public social projects among the ruling elite, who came to regard them as communism. The law from 1847, which was influenced by the liberalism of the 1840s, came to be regarded as too generous, and gradually the authorities came to practice it more and more strictly. This was illustrated during the Swedish famine of 1867–1869, when emergency relief was delivered almost exclusively to those willing to work for it. A growing opinion felt that society should take responsibility only for orphans, the aged, the insane and the mentally or physically challenged, and deny any form of assistance to all adults who were physically and mentally healthy.

In 1871, the law of 1847 was reformed. While the organisation and the system introduced in 1847 was kept in form, the law of 1871 introduced more strict qualifications as to who should be allowed to receive social benefits. By this reform, social benefits was banned for everyone except for those physically or mentally unable to work, such as orphans, the aged, the insane and the mentally or physically challenged, and further more banned the right to appeal a decision made by the Poor Care Board. The law of 1871 was thereby a severe deterioration of social help in Sweden, and those needing no longer qualified to apply for help from the state because of the new regulations was forced to rely on private charity (foremost the local Fruntimmers-skyddsförening) as well as old outdated customs such as rotegång, the pauper auction and child auctions.

It was not until the Poor Care Law of 1918 that the entire poor relief system in Sweden was truly reformed and the Rotegång, the pauper auctions, the child auctions, the poor houses and other old fashioned phenomena were abolished.

== See also ==
- Welfare in Sweden
