= Anna Pettersson =

Swedish lawyer

Anna Maria Pettersson (5 January 1861 – 6 September 1929) was a Swedish lawyer. She was the first woman in Sweden to set up a legal agency, run by a woman, which was aimed primarily at female clients. Pettersson was also active in the Swedish National Association for Women's Suffrage (FKPR).

== Life ==
Anna Pettersson was born in Uppsala to the gardener Johan Fredrik Pettersson and Charlotta Amalia Günlsdorff. She never married. She trained to be a language teacher, but was always interested in the law and educated herself in law as an autodidact. Between 1890 and 1901, she worked as a clerk at the local law court of Uppsala, and from 1901 to 1904, at the law firm of Victor Wennerholm in Stockholm.

In 1904, she founded her own legal agency, the Kvinnliga Juridiska Byrån ('Women's Legal Bureau') in Stockholm. She thereby became the first woman in Sweden to start a legal agency, run by a woman, and with primarily female clients. She specialised in legal advice to women in matters of family issues, particularly divorce and women's property rights, which was a complicated issue in the early 20th century, when a woman's rights differed greatly depending on her marital status. She was known to give legal advice free of charge to women who could not pay.

Anna Pettersson was a member of the Fredrika Bremer Association women's rights organisation as well as a member of the board of the Swedish National Association for Women's Suffrage, and wrote articles about women's legal and marriage rights, nationally (in the women's magazine Dagny, for example) and internationally.

She was supported by Elsa Eschelsson, Sofia Gumaelius and Agda Montelius. Eschelsson occasionally assisted her with legal advice, and encouraged her to continue as long as she had clients. However, while it was not illegal for a person without formal training to offer legal advice, her practice was all the same questioned by lawyers. Her bureau was highly successful among women. In 1915, she retired and left her bureau to Eva Andén, Sweden's first formally trained female lawyer.

Pettersson died in Stockholm in 1929.
