= Children's gulag =

Alleged Swedish child welfare scandal

Children's gulag (Swedish: Barngulag; in German: Kindergulag) was a metaphorical expression coined by the German magazine Der Spiegel in 1983, for an alleged scandal regarding children who were taken from their families by the government on weak legal grounds in Sweden.

== History ==
In August 1983 Der Spiegel published a long article titled "Kindergulag im Sozialstaat Schweden".

In response to this accusation and to correct West Germans, the Swedish Ministry for Foreign Affairs called a press conference with over 150 journalists on 8 November 1983. It claimed that West German media had given a wrong view about the Swedish welfare state. The Minister of Foreign Affairs was then accused of trying to 'control' the reporting and trying to give them the "correct" picture of Sweden, and the meeting became chaotic. It emerged later that this was the result of a deliberate attempt by domestic lobby groups to use the international press for their purposes.

Even a school superior, Åke Elmér, responded to the accusation and presented a comparison in the Swedish newspaper Dagens Nyheter, proposing that the real problem was just in West Germany:

Children under care 1978
	Sweden		West Germany	
	Total	%	Total	%
In prison, youth care school or equivalent	300	0,02	7,300	0,05
In an orphanage or youth home	1,500	0,07	73,000	0,49
As a foster child	14,300	0,7	65,000	0,44
Total	16,100	0,79	145,000	0,98

== See also ==
- Welfare in Sweden
- Foster care
