= Backstugusittare =

Historical Swedish demographic term

A backstugusittare (lit. 'hill cottage sitter', Finnish: mäkitupalainen) is a historical term of a certain category of the country side population in the history of Sweden and Finland. It referred to the inhabitants of a backstuga (hill cottage), who lived on common land or the land of someone else and did not engage in any farming.

In contrast to the somewhat similar torpare, backstugusittare did not use any land and lived on the charity of the landowner or, if they lived on common land, on the charity of the village. They may grow some potatoes for their own use and have some smaller animals but normally only enough to eat themselves. That category of people were normally among the very poorest of the village community and supported themselves on odd jobs, some handicrafts and charity.

The phenomenon is confirmed from the early 17th-century. After the land reform of 1827, during which the farmers moved out from the villages and occupied land previously left for the torpare, the category grew larger, as the torpare were often given no other choice than to become backstugusittare. However, during the 19th-century, it also became more common for successful village craftsmen to live temporarily in the backstuga merely to save money, which somewhat raised the status of backstugusittare.
