= Svälten: Hungeråren som formade Sverige =

2018 book by Magnus Västerbro

The Famine: The Years of Hunger that Shaped Sweden
- The first edition
- Author: Magnus Västerbro
- Original title: Svälten: Hungeråren som formade Sverige
- Language: Swedish
- Genre: history
- Published: July 31, 2018
- Publisher: Albert Bonniers förlag
- Publication place: Sweden
- Awards: August Prize (2018)
- Preceded by: Pest och kolera: Historiens värsta farsoter (lit. 'Plague and Cholera: The Worst Plagues in History') (2017)
- Followed by: Vålnadernas historia: Spöken, skeptiker och drömmen om den odödliga själen (lit. 'The History of Ghosts: Ghosts, Skeptics and the Dream of the Immortal Soul') (2019)

Svälten: Hungeråren som formade Sverige (lit. 'The Famine: The Years of Hunger that Shaped Sweden') is the fourth book published by Swedish journalist and author Magnus Västerbro. It won the August Prize in 2018 for the category of Best Swedish Non-Fiction.

The book recalls the historical Swedish famine of 1867–1869.
