= Backstuga =

Type of rural cottage

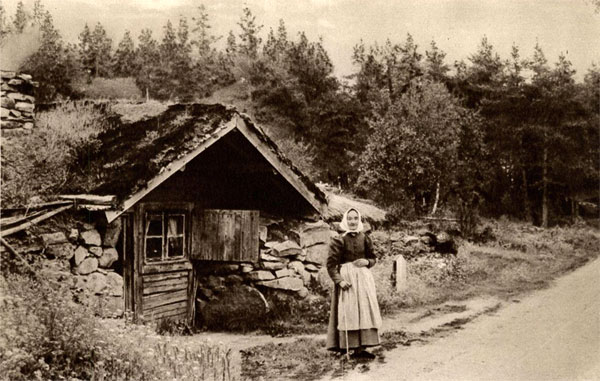
A backstuga in Småland.

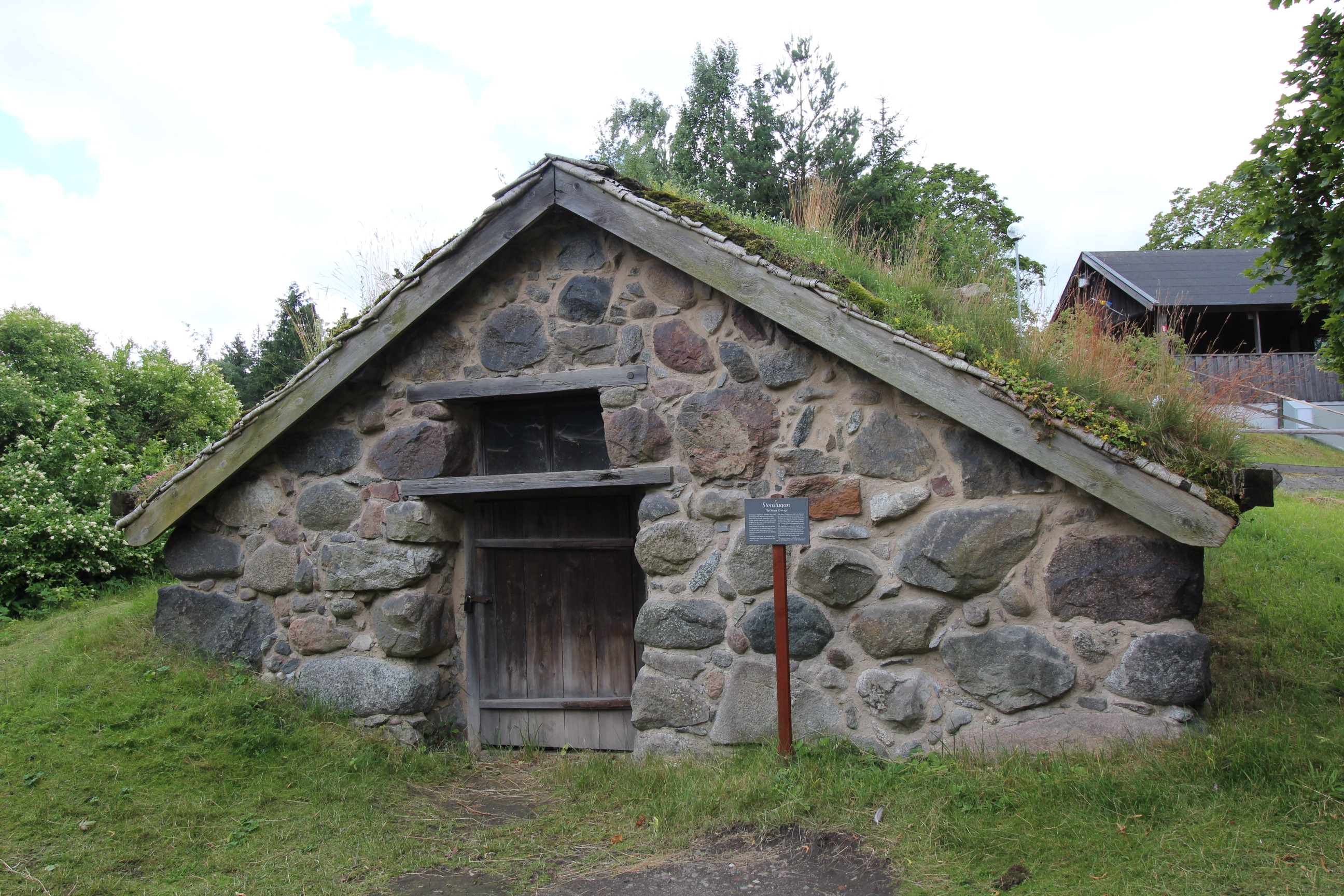
"Stenstugan" at the Skansen museum

A backstuga (literally "slope cottage" or "freeground cottage") is a Swedish language judicial term, previously used in Finland and Sweden, for a kind of rural cottage.

The basic criterion is that the small building on someone else's property, often public land, is a finite right that cannot be sold. Unlike pure squatter slums, there was usually some form of legal contract on a backstuga. A small piece of land, suitable for, for example, a potato field, often belonged to the backstuga.

The term has been known since the beginning of the 17th century, but it was only from the beginning of the 19th century that backstugusittare were reported separately from crofters. The estate statistics of 1805 say just over 28 000 backstugor, while in the middle of the 19th century 45 000, and in 1885 50 000 are reported and 1910 down to 22 658.

Backstugas were often inhabited by old, decrepit people and could, for example, be assigned to exceptions contracts, retired faithful servants, or the parish's poor boys instead of for the poorhouse. Exceptions contract is a contractual right for the seller to retain for the remainder of his life the usufruct of a small residence or a small area of land that is exempt from the buyer's right to dispose of the transferred agricultural property.

== Design ==
Additionally, in architecture, a backstuga is a cottage built into the southern slope of a hill, alternatively with a low floor and its walls stretched halfway down into the ground. Such cottages are also referred to as jordstuga (earth cottage) or stenstuga (stone cottage). They were small, typically about 20 square metres (220 sq ft), and only exceptionally found further north than Gothenburg. In the 20th century, the general poverty was mitigated and this kind of homes became less and less used. They were very close in design to other European Pit-houses.

== Social ==
In administrative respect, the legal meaning is a rural home with no land to farm that was built on someone else's property and without an own entry in the land registry. Its dwellers were called backstugusittare with a connotation of pauper. This phenomenon is known from the early 1600s and was disliked by the government seeing it as a way to evade taxes. The house may have been owned by the head of the family living there, but taxes were the responsibility of the land owner. Such cottages were typically raised on land useless for farming. Also the common land of the village, or that of the parish, were usual spots.

A backstuga in this judicial meaning may have been inhabited by craftsmen, and not necessarily small, or by those of the peasantry not active in the productive life of the community, such as old people who could no longer work, retired servants and the community destitute who had no relatives to care for them. In practice, although legally forbidden until 1846, a parish may have offered to pay for a backstuga-dwelling to a pauper instead of offering a place in a poor house, that all parishes didn't care to organize. The legal alternative, called rotegång, was to let the poor wander from farm to farm, following a strict scheme staying one or a few days at each. But its popularity waned.

Technically, also a farmer whose farm was taken over by a son or a son-in-law, was registered as housed either by the son or in a backstuga. But here the word is used in the population registry and in a statistical context. In church records, the term is undantagsman (or undantagsänka for a widow), which contrary to backstugusittare do not confer any social stigma.

== See also ==
- Torp (architecture)
- Pit-house
