= 1916 in Sweden =

- Decades: 1890s; 1900s; 1910s; 1920s; 1930s
- See also: Other events of 1916; Timeline of Swedish history

Events from the year 1916 in Sweden

== Incumbents ==
- Monarch – Gustaf V
- Prime Minister - Hjalmar Hammarskjöld

== Events ==
- March - Inauguration of the Liljevalchs konsthall.

== Births ==
- 3 January – Erik Ågren, boxer (died 1985).
- 10 January – Sune Bergström, biochemist (died 2004).
- 14 April – Pehr Victor Edman, chemist (died 1977 in Germany)
- 6 May – Sif Ruud, actress (died 2011).
- 16 December – Birgitta Valberg, actress (died 2014)

== Deaths ==
- 5 March - Cilluf Olsson, textile artist (born 1847)
