= Välgörande fruntimmerssällskapet =

Swedish women's charitable society

Välgörande fruntimmerssällskapet (The Women's Charitable Society) was a Swedish charity organization, active between 1819 until its dissolution in 1934. The purpose of the organisation was to collect funds to support poor females in the capital of Stockholm, but specifically institutions and projects of various kinds which could provide poor females with work and opportunity to support themselves.

The foundation belonged to the very first group of charitable organisations, which were to become so numerous during the 19th century but were still uncommon at the time of its foundation. It was further more also likely the first foundation in its country to be founded and operated exclusively by females and was thereby Sweden's first women's organisation. The society was founded by a group of upper-class women under the leadership of Princess Sophie Albertine of Sweden, who also became its first chairperson. The chairperson of the organisation continued to be occupied by female members of the royal house until its dissolution.

The society played an important part in the development of private secular charity in Sweden during the 19th century, and many women's charity organizations was founded in the following decades with it as predecessor, notably the numerous women's protection societies.

== Chairperson ==
The Society was not properly organized until 1825, when it also had its first chairperson:

- 1825–1829: Sophie Albertine of Sweden
- 1829–1876: Josephine of Leuchtenberg
- 1876–1889: Princess Eugenie of Sweden
- 1889–1905: Victoria of Baden
- 1905–1920: Princess Margaret of Connaught
- 1920–1930: Victoria of Baden
