= Emihamn =

Swedish database of historical emigration records

Emihamn is a database of passenger lists compiled from police records for Swedish emigrants departing from major Swedish ports between the years 1869–1950. Almost all emigrants were required to register with the port police prior to leaving the country. The register generally includes the passenger's name, occupation/title, age at the time of emigration, birthplace or place of residence, county, destination, and date of emigration, among other information. It is useful as a resource for genealogists who know their ancestor's name and date of emigration, but do not know the ancestor's birthplace.

== See also ==
- Swedish emigration to the United States
