= Basilius Suosaari =

Finnish-Australian politician and farmer (1861-1939)

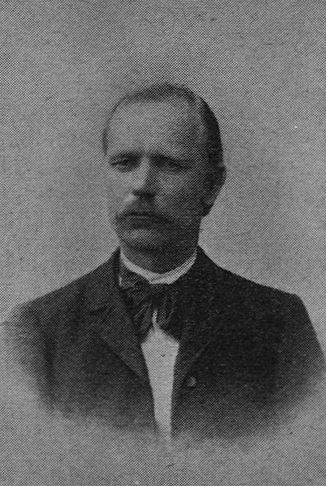
- Basilius Suosaari in 1907

Member of the Finnish Parliament for Vyborg East
- In office 22 May 1907 – 31 July 1908
- In office 1 June 1909 – 28 February 1910

Personal details
- Born: 4 April 1861 Impilahti, Grand Duchy of Finland
- Died: 4 July 1939 (aged 78) Bli Bli, Queensland
- Party: Social Democratic

Basilius Suosaari (born Vasili Tichanoff, 4 April 1861 - 4 July 1939) was a Finnish-Australian politician and farmer. He was a Member of the Parliament of Finland for the Social Democratic Party in 1907-1908 and 1909-1910.

Suosaari was born to a poor peasant family in Karelia, next to the Russian border. He was sold in a child auction for 13 years and worked later as a carpenter and a miner. In 1911, Suosaari emigrated to Australia where he settled Bli Bli, Queensland and ran a sugarcane farm. He was also active in a local utopian socialist community founded by the followers of Matti Kurikka.

Suosaari died in Bli Bli at the age of 78 in July 1939. He was buried to the Nambour Old Cemetery.

Basilius Suosaari was married to Anna Brita Nupponen (1869-1958) with 11 children. Their son Axel Suosaari (1908-1934) was a talented swimmer who was the Australian Champion of 100 yards freestyle swimming in 1930-1931. The Finnish Olympic Committee asked him to compete in the 1928 Summer Olympics, but Suosaari refused as he wanted to swim for Australia.
