= 1913 in Sweden =

- Decades: 1890s; 1900s; 1910s; 1920s; 1930s
- See also: Other events of 1913; Timeline of Swedish history

Events from the year 1913 in Sweden

== Incumbents ==
- Monarch – Gustaf V
- Prime Minister - Karl Staaff

== Events ==
- 1 January – The National Board of Health and Welfare is founded
- 7–16 February – The Nordic Games take place in Stockholm.
- 27 April – The Swedish Olympic Committee is established.
- Date unknown – Foundation of the Samfundet De Nio.

== Births ==
- 16 February - Tage Holmberg, film editor (died 1989)
- 18 August - Nils Löfgren, chemist (died 1967)
- 14 September - Annalisa Ericson, actress (died 2011)
- 15 October - Thore Jederby, upright jazz bassist, record producer and radio broadcaster (died 1984)
- 6 December - John Mikaelsson, Olympic racewalker (died 1987)

== Deaths ==
- 2 February - Gustaf de Laval, engineer and inventor (born 1845)
- 2 February - Hans Hildebrand, archeologist (born 1842)
- 26 April – Eva Brag, journalist, novelist and poet (born 1829)
- Emma Schenson, photographer (born 1827)
