= 1914 in Sweden =

1914 was the first year of the First World War, though this had little effect on the nation as for the entirety of the war, the Sweden would remain neutral.

== Demographics ==
- Decades: 1890s; 1900s; 1910s; 1920s; 1930s
- See also: Other events of 1914; Timeline of Swedish history

Life expectancy - ~58 years

Fertility rate - 3.2 births per woman

Population - 5.7 million

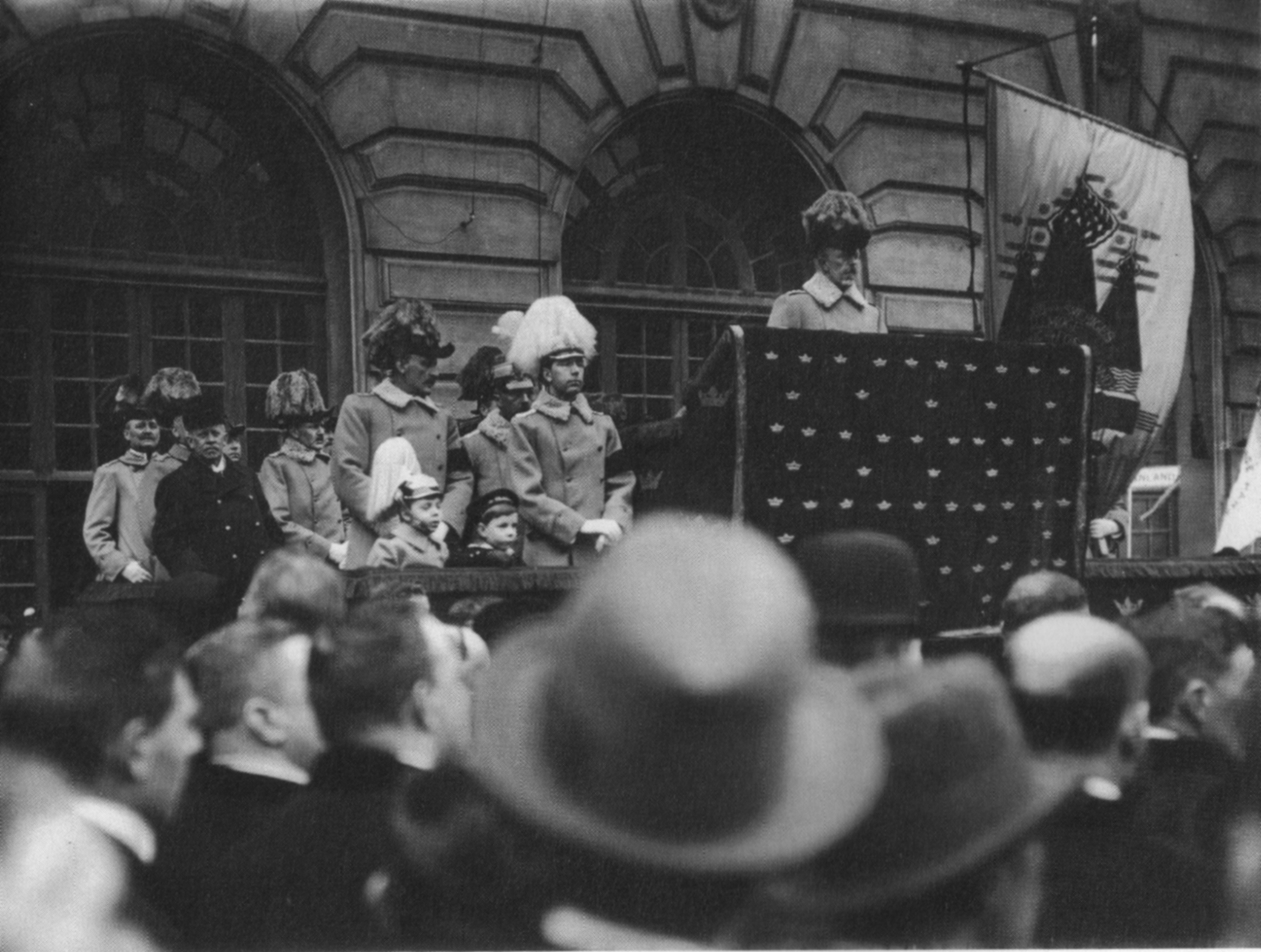
King Gustaf V during the Courtyard Speech

== Important Figures ==
- Monarch – Gustaf V
- Prime Ministers - Karl Staaff, Hjalmar Hammarskjöld
- Minister for Foreign Affairs - Knut Agathon Wallenberg

== Events ==
- 6 February - Courtyard Speech
- 6 February - Peasant armament support march
- 27 March - March 1914 Swedish general election
- 28 May - Selma Lagerlöf inducted to the Swedish Academy.
- 5 September - September 1914 Swedish general election
- 31 July - Declaration of neutrality in the Austro-Serbian conflict
- 2 August - Knut Wallenberg speaks to Esmé Howard and tells him that if Sweden were to enter this conflict, then they would never fight on the side of Russia
- 3 August - Declaration of neutrality in the conflict between Germany, and France and Russia
- 8 August - Sweden enters a join declaration of neutrality between all belligerents in World War I with Norway
- 18–19 December - King Gustaf V meets with Christian X of Denmark and Haakon VII of Norway in Malmö

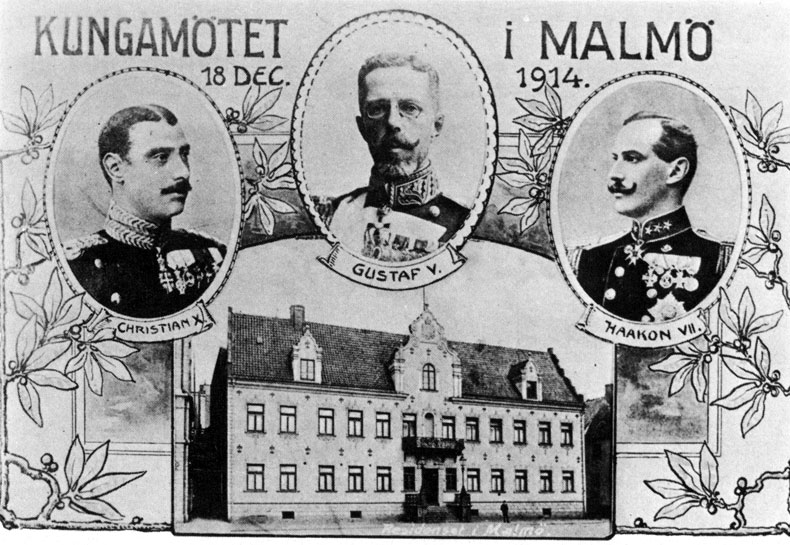
Card representing the Trekungamötet (Meeting of the three kings) in Malmö, December 18, 1914

== Births ==
This is an incomplete list

- 30 January - Inga-Bodil Vetterlund, actor (died 14 September 1980 at 66)
- 14 February - Britt G. Hallqvist, poet (died 20 March 1997 at 83)
- 26 March - Åke Grönberg, actor (died 15 September 1969 at 55)
- 18 April - Tord Bernheim, actor (died 23 July 1992 at 78)
- 10 July - Henrik Schildt, actor (15 March 2001 at 87)
- 11 July - Sven Fahlman, fencer (died 23 June 2003 at 88)
- 25 July - Olle Nordemar, actor (died 18 February 1999 at 84)
- 9 October - Bengt Logardt, actor (died 25 September 1994 at 79)

== Deaths ==
- 1 March - Tor Aulin, violinist (born 1866 in Sweden)
- 20 April – Ivar Wickman, physician who discovered the epidemic and contagious character of poliomyelitis in 1907 (born 1872)
- 10 November - Nils Christoffer Dunér, astronomer (born 1839)
