= List of ships named Kungsholm =

Kungsholm (Swedish language for "King's Island") may refer to any of these passenger ships:

- SS Kungsholm, an ocean liner, launched in 1901, operated by the Rederi AB Sverige-Nordamerika 1923–1924
- MS Kungsholm (1928), an ocean liner operated by the Swedish American Line 1928–1942
- MS Kungsholm (1952), a combined ocean liner/cruise ship operated by the Swedish American Line 1953–1965
- MV Kungsholm, a combined ocean liner/cruise ship operated by the Swedish American Line 1966–1975 and Flagship Cruises 1975–1978
