= H. Arnold Barton =

American historian

Hildor Arnold Barton (November 30, 1929 – September 28, 2016) was an American historian and a national authority on Scandinavian history, especially the history of Sweden, and of Swedes and other Scandinavians in North America.

== Early life ==
Barton was born of Swedish descent in Los Angeles, California, in 1929, the son of Sven Hildor Barton (1892–1972) and Marguerite Anna née Lemke (1901–1983). His paternal grandfather was born in Djursdala parish, Småland county, Sweden and emigrated to America in 1867. His paternal grandmother was born in Bollnäs parish, Hälsingland county and emigrated to America in 1889. His mother was a niece of Harry Edward Arnhold.

He was married to Aina Barton (born 1925).

== Career ==
Barton received his B.A. degree at Pomona College and his doctorate at Princeton University. Arnold Barton taught history at the University of Alberta, Edmonton, Alberta, Canada (1960 to 1963) and at the University of California, Santa Barbara (1963 to 1970). He taught at Southern Illinois University, Carbondale, Illinois, where he became professor in 1975 and from where he retired in 1996 as professor emeritus of history.

After retiring he moved to Sweden.

His research and writing covers a broad register, including Scandinavia in the era of the French Revolutionary-Napoleonic era, relations between homeland Swedes and Swedish Americans, and the Swedish-Norwegian union of 1814–1905. Barton has served on the boards of the Swedish–American Historical Society and the Swenson Swedish Immigration Research Center. Between 1974 and 1990, Barton served as editor of the Swedish-American Historical Quarterly.

== Honors and recognition ==
In 1985, Professor H. Arnold Barton was awarded the Charlotta Medal in recognition of his contributions to the Swedish Emigrant Institute at Växjö, Småland, Sweden. Barton was named "Swedish-American of the Year" in 1988 by the Royal Swedish Ministry of Foreign Affairs and by the two Swedish District lodges of the Vasa Order of America. In 1989, he was granted an honorary doctorate from Uppsala University, Sweden. In 2000, he was made Knight-Commander of the Royal Swedish Order of the Polar Star by King Carl XVI Gustaf of Sweden. In 2012 he received the Swedish Council of America's Great Achievement Award.

== Death ==
He died on September 28, 2016, in the Stockholm suburb of Trollbäcken, Tyresö. Barton was buried at Solna kyrkogård, in the suburb of Solna.

== Selected bibliography ==
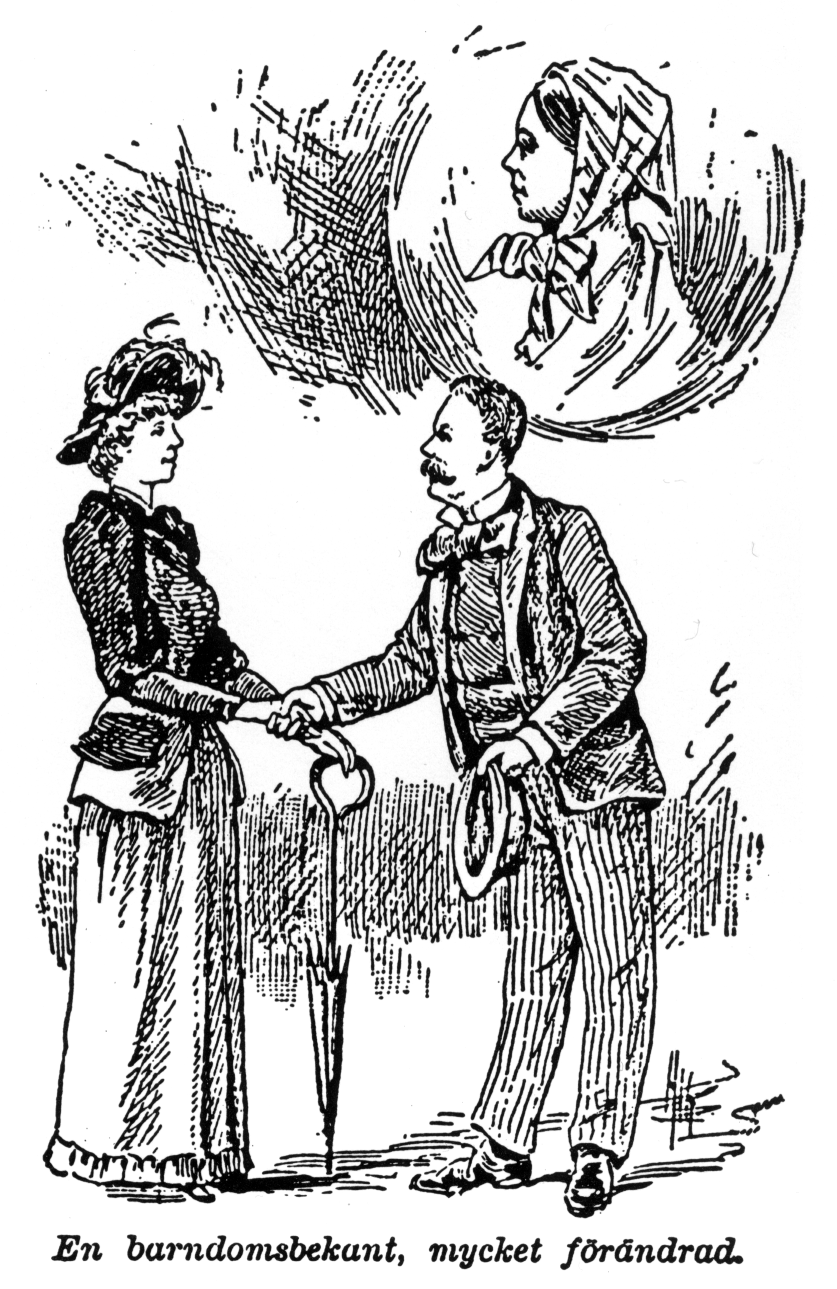
"A childhood acquaintance, greatly changed." Drawing from 1892, illustrating the transformation in North America of a young immigrant woman from Sweden, from Gustaf Sjöström's Jan Olsons Äfventyr, 1892. Reproduced in H. Arnold Barton, A Folk Divided: Homeland Swedes and Swedish Americans 1840-1940

- Count Hans Axel von Fersen: Aristocrat in an Age of Revolution (1975)
- Letters from the Promised Land: Swedes in America, 1840-1914 (1975)
- The Search for Ancestors: A Swedish-American Family Saga (1979)
- Scandinavia in the Revolutionary Era, 1760-1815 (1986)
- A Folk Divided: Homeland Swedes and Swedish Americans, 1840-1940 (1994)
- Northern Arcadia: Foreign Travelers in Scandinavia, 1765-1815 (1998)
- Sweden and Visions of Norway: Politics and Culture, 1814-1905 (2003)
- The Old Country and the New: Essays on Swedes and America (2006)
- Essays on Scandinavian History (2009)

== See also ==
- Society for the Advancement of Scandinavian Study
