= Torp (architecture) =

Small house and area rented for agriculture from a larger farm

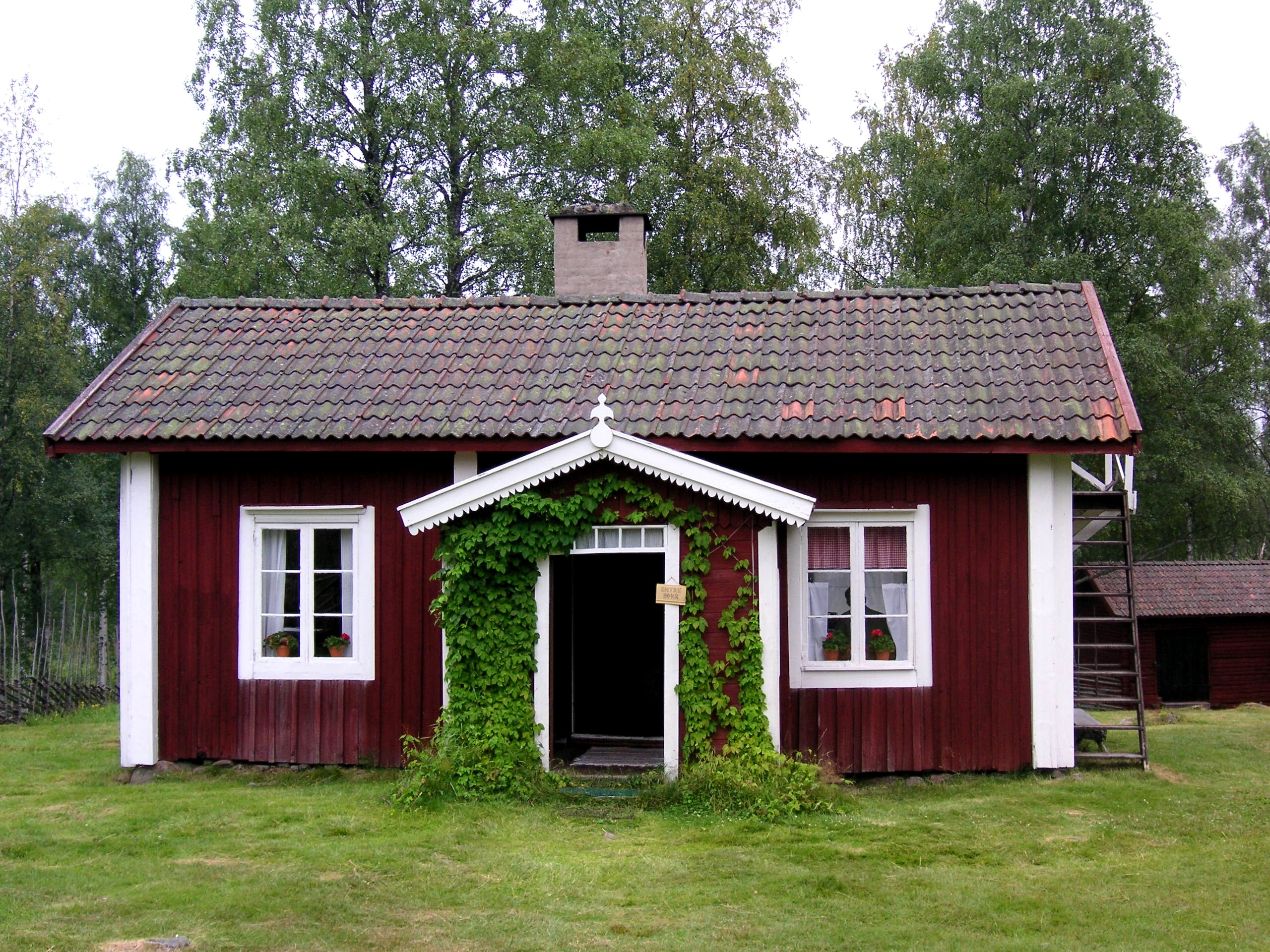
A typical Swedish torp. The author Dan Andersson lived in this one.

A torp (Swedish pronunciation: [tɔrp]) is a type of cottage emblematic of the Swedish countryside. It comes from the Old Norse þorp. In modern usage, it is the classic Swedish summer house, a small cottage painted in Falu red and white, and evidence of the way in which urbanization came quite late to all of Scandinavia. Its characteristic falu röd colour is ubiquitous in Sweden and became popular due to the paint's affordability. In the meaning of "simple second home", the concept exists under other names in Danish, Norwegian (hytte – but the term torp is also used in Norwegian) and Finnish (mökki or torppa).

The word is cognate with the English thorp (a secondary settlement or small group of houses in the countryside), which is found in many English placenames. Its meaning in Swedish has shifted over time. Before the 16th century, a torp was a separate farm, usually established by a farmer who had moved out from a village, and which often grew to become a village in its own right. In 16th-century Sweden, which at that time included Finland, a torp was the term for the smallest size of the farm, paying a quarter of a "full" farm's taxes. When that classification became obsolete, a torp became a leased farm (with short lease times typically of one or two years), paid for with manual work on the owner's fields.

Since the mid-20th century, most of the surviving torp cottages in Scandinavia have come to serve as summer homes for city dwellers. Before that, being brought up in a torp was a sign of relatively modest ancestry, with lower status than that of lifelong tenants—and very much lower than that of freeholding farmers, however small their farm—although torp dwellers were higher on the social scale than farmhands, maids and those who lived in paupers' cottages (backstugusittare).

In Danish and Norwegian, the common noun for an inhabitant of a torp is husmann/husmand – a man with a house. Such men owned their houses, but no land. In Swedish, the term husbonde remain in archaic form.

In Age of Empires III: Definitive edition, torps are unique buildings for Swedish civilization, that substitute houses and provide resources if the building is near them.

== See also ==
- Bach (New Zealand)
- Dacha
