= Hulda Mellgren =

Hulda Mellgren (1839–1918) was a Swedish industrialist.

She was the daughter of a Major Hansson. She married in 1858 to the tobacco industrialist Johan August Mellgren (1829–1877), with whom she had twelve children.

She took over the Mellgrens Snus och Tobaksfabrik ('Mellgren Snus and Tobacco Factory') when she was widowed in 1877. She managed the firm assisted by her two brothers-in-law until she retired in favor of her sons Erik Olof Mellgren and Anders Valdemar Mellgren in 1900. During her tenure, the factory was one of the leading snus factories in Sweden.

A street in Gothenburg, Hulda Mellgrens Gata (Hulda Mellgren Street) was named after her.
