= Poor Care Law of 1918 =

Poor Care Law of 1918 (Swedish: 1918 års fattigvårdslag) was a Swedish Poor Law which organized the public Poor relief in the Sweden. It replaced the 1871 års fattigvårdförordning and was in effect until the modern Social Help Law of 1952.

The law was clubbed by the Swedish Parliament on 14 June 1918. It replaced the Law of 1871, which had been very strict and complemented by abusive practices such as Rotegång, the pauper auctions and child auction.

The law of 1918 reformed and humanized the entire social relief system in Sweden. It transformed the old poor care system to a more modern social welfare law, expanded the right to social help to and reintroduced the right to appeal. It abolished a number of practices associated with the old system, such as the Rotegång, the pauper auctions, the child auctions, and transformed the old poor houses to retirement homes.

== See also ==
- Welfare in Sweden
