= Sofia Gumaelius =

Swedish businessperson

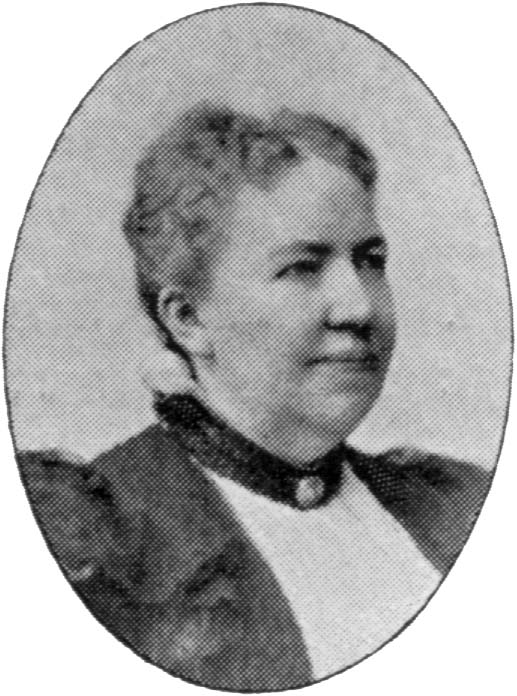
- Born: 8 December 1840; Örebro, Sweden
- Died: 23 January 1915 (aged 74); Stockholm, Sweden
- Occupation: Advertising executive
- Known for: founding Gumaelius Annonsbyrå
- Partner: Anna Björnlund

Sofia Lovisa Gumaelius (8 December 1840 in Örebro – 23 January 1915 in Stockholm), was a Swedish businessperson.

== Early life ==
She was the daughter of Otto Joel Gumaelius, founder of the newspaper Nerikes Allehanda. In July 1877, Sofia Gumaelius founded the advertising agency "Nya annonsbyrån, landsortspressens egen annonsförmedlare", generally referred to as Gumaelius Annonsbyrå or Gumaelius. It is known as one of the oldest advertising and communications businesses in the world.

In 1877 Sofia Gumaelius rented two rooms in Stockholm’s old town, intended as a temporary office. She borrowed some of the money for the start up from her brother Arvid Gumaelius and started the business off on her own. After a few months she needed to hire people and the first employee was Agda Wilson. The company quickly grew in size and within a year the office location had to be changed. In 1908 the firm built a new building in central Stockholm for their office. During Sofia Gumaelius’ lifetime offices were also established in London, Oslo, Malmö and Gothenburg.

== Career ==
From 1881 the name S. Gumaelii Annonsbyrå was registered as an abbreviation for Sofia Gumaelius’ Annonsbyrå. In 1883 Sofia Gumaelius also established the firm Gumaelius & Co, for printing supplies. In 1918, both these firms were joint into one firm under the name S Gumaelius. As an advertising person she was known for being strongly in favour of creating truthful messages in advertising to build trust among consumers.

She differed her agency at an early stage in relation to her competitors by employing illustrators at an early stage and by focusing on ads with visual elements and slogans.

== Social activism ==
Sofia Gumaelius was socially engaged and had an interest in democracy and free publicity. For some years she was treasurer in the Swedish organisation for women suffrage, National Association for Women's Suffrage. She was active in the Swedish journalist association Publicistklubben where she participated until her death and where she was referred to as ”The first lady of the Press” among her associates. She was the vice chairman of the women's club of her time Kvinnoklubben and was active in the women’s organisation Fredrika Bremer Association.

== Death and legacy ==
At her death, she was described as the greatest businesswoman in her country. Her business lived on beyond her death.
