= Fattigauktion =

19th century Swedish "poor auctions"

Fattigauktion ('poor auction'), was a historical practice within Swedish poor relief during the 19th century, in which paupers were auctioned off to a bidder among the parishioners willing to house them in exchange for the lowest amount of money for their keep from the parish poor care board.

In accordance with the Poor Relief Regulation 1847, every parish was responsible for the support of the poor within their parish, a help financed by every member of the parish through the church fund, and distributed and organized through the poor care board. Paupers were divided in two classes. The first class consisted of a pauper unable to support themselves, usually meaning old people, orphans, and the physically or mentally disabled. The second class consisted of people being temporarily supported by poor relief.

The paupers of the first class were, according to law, to be placed in a poor house, an orphanage or a hospital. In reality, however, many parishes in the country side neglected to build such institutions within their parish because of the costs. The law stipulated, that if there was not a poor house in the parish, then the parish poor care board was, by law, responsible for providing economic support for the pauper and must pay for food, clothing, housing, medical care and funeral. Because of this, the fattigauktion became a preferred choice for a parish wishing to save money.

Every year, a plate was placed in the church stating the paupers of the first class. The last Sunday before Christmas, the "auction" was held in the community house after church service. The parish poor care board held an auction of the first class paupers to the members of the parish, who were to make bids for them. Despite the name, this was not an actual auction, nor were the paupers actually bought. The bidders made a "bid" stating what amount of money they would demand from the poor care board in exchange for taking care of the pauper for a period of one year. As the parish poor care board wished to save money, the person making the lowest "bid" won the auction. As the bidders had the support of the law to demand that the pauper contributed with chores in the household to their ability, the bidders could acquire cheap work force through this custom. When one year was up, the pauper (unless he or she was able to support themselves by then), was auctioned off again.

The fattigauktion was related to the traditional practice of rotegång. Rotegång, however, had been banned for children in 1847, so the fattigauktion became especially common for children, while rotegång were often used for adult paupers. The practice was condemned as humiliating and abusing, and there were reports of abuse, especially of pauper children, who were auctioned off and used as slave labor for the lowest cost possible. Legally, neither the fattigauktion nor the rotegång were a part of the official poor care law, but neither was it forbidden, and it continued as a common practice in rural parishes which did not have a poor house, as late as the early 20th century.

Fattigauktion, as well as a number of other outdated practices within poor care such as rotegång and poor houses, was abolished by the reformed Poor Law of 1918.

== See also ==
- Welfare in Sweden
- Child auction
