= Rotegång =

Historical care for the poor in Sweden

Rotegång ('walk the parish') or kringgång ('walk around') was a historical form of care for the poor in the history of Sweden to support the very poorest in the peasant community.

Rotegång was practiced in the Swedish countryside already in the Middle Ages to care for those of the community destitute who could not work. In 1296, it was mentioned in the Law of Uppland that a community pauper had the right to be given shelter in the households of the parish for 24 hours each. This method was a phenomenon of the countryside, as the city paupers were normally given shelter in the poor houses from at least circa 1300 onward.

Those of the destitute fattighjon (pauper) who could not be placed in a backstuga or in a poor house, which did not always exist in rural communities, were referred to the rotegång. The households of a parish were traditionally divided into rotes: normally, one rote of the village contained six households. Each rote was given responsibility for one pauper each, who were then shifted between them according to a schedule. Normally, the pauper stayed in each household for one week at a time. The pauper was assigned a fattigklubba ('poor club') or fattigbricka ('poor badge') of wood as a sign of their status, where the schedule was described. They were expected to contribute with what they could in exchange for food, care and housing.

Closely related to the rotegång was the fattigauktion ('poor auction'), where paupers (often orphans but also adults), were auctioned off to interested households willing to house them more for a year, which differed from rotegång. The people participating in the 'auction' did not actually buy the pauper; however, their 'bid' was the money they demanded from the parish poor care to house them and so those who offered to take care of the poor for the lowest amount won. The pauper auctions were a somewhat later phenomenon, which eventually became more common than rotegång, in particular since rotegång was abolished for children by the 1847 års fattigvårdförordning.

In the reformed Poor Law of 1918, rotegång as well as fattigvårdsauktion and child auction were abolished along with the poor houses.

== See also ==
- Welfare in Sweden
