= Child auction =

Historical form of poor care

Child auction (Swedish: barnauktion, Finnish: huutolaisuus) was a historical practice in Sweden and Finland during the 19th and early 20th centuries, in which orphan and poor children were boarded out in auctions. The name auction, however, does not refer to actual slave auctions, as the children in these auctions were never actually bought in a legal sense, but the name has become the common name for the practice.

The children were handed over to the person asking least money from the authorities to provide for the child. The compensation was determined in descending English auctions, where the children were present. The lowest bidder became the child's foster parent and was compensated with an annual amount equal to the bid. The foster parents provided the child with housing, upbringing and education, but the children were often used for child labour. Especially in the Finnish countryside, children sold at auction usually lived in very poor conditions and were mistreated.

Child auctions were prohibited in Sweden in 1918 and in Finland in 1923. However, auctions were still organized in Finland until the late 1930s. The last known child auction was held in 1935. Some of the children were still living with their foster parents in the 1940s.

Among the notable people who were sold in child auctions are the Swedish politician Fredrik Vilhelm Thorsson, who later became the Minister for Finance of Sweden, Swedish school founder Hanna Lindmark, Finnish politicians Eino Kujanpää, Jukka Lankila and Vasili Suosaari, and Finnish author Joel Lehtonen.

Similar practices were also carried out in other European countries, like the Verdingkinder institution in Switzerland.

== See also ==
- Fattigauktion – 19th century Swedish "poor auctions"
- Rotegång – Historical care for the poor in Sweden
