= 1943 in Sweden =

- Decades: 1920s; 1930s; 1940s; 1950s; 1960s
- See also: Other events of 1943; Timeline of Swedish history

Events from the year 1943 in Sweden

== Incumbents ==
- Monarch – Gustaf V
- Prime Minister – Per Albin Hansson

== Events ==
- 10 March – 27 April – Norwegian Exhibition runs in Stockholm.
- July 28 – IKEA was founded in Älmhult, Sweden, by Ingvar Kamprad
- October 2 – Sweden offers passports to Danish Jews fleeing Nazi aggression.
- September 23 – Trade negotiations result in Sweden repealing prior arrangements with Germany - which had allowed for the transport of German goods and troops across the country - in exchange for an increase in trade exports to Sweden from the Allied Powers.

== Births ==
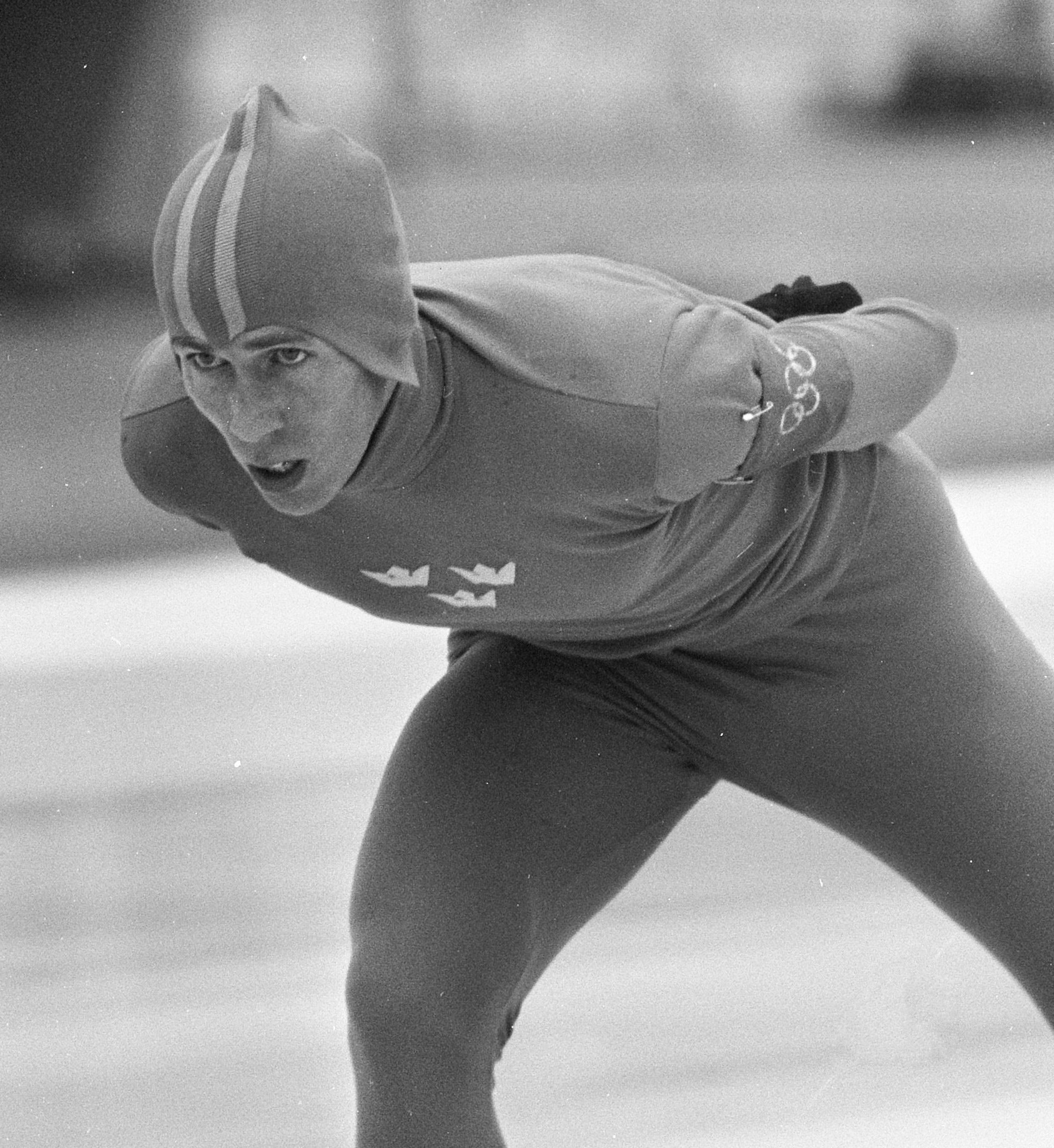
Johnny Höglin in 1968.

- 3 January – Jarl Alfredius, journalist (died 2009).
- 6 February – Pelle Svensson, wrestler, Olympic silver medalist (died 2020).
- 26 February – Johnny Höglin, speed-skater, Olympic champion in 10,000 metre from 1968.
- 9 May – Anders Isaksson, journalist (died 2009).
- 8 July – Anders Carlberg, politician (died 2013).
- 30 November – Rolf Edling, fencer.

=== Exact date unknown ===
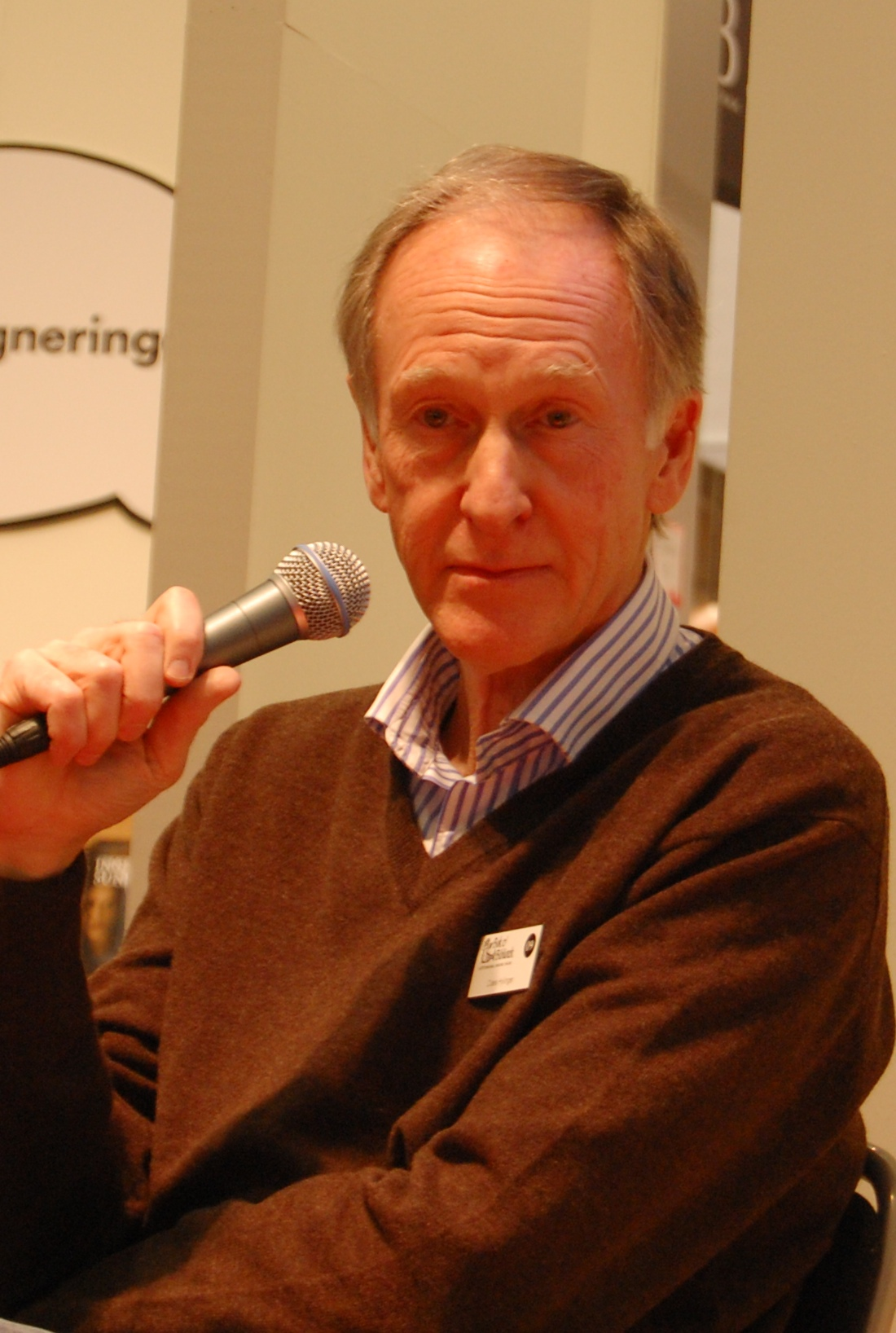
Claes Hylinger

- Claes Hylinger, novelist, essayist, poet and literary critic.

== Deaths ==
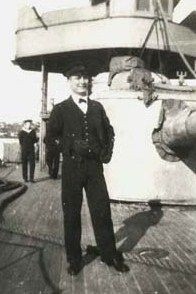
Yngve Holm.

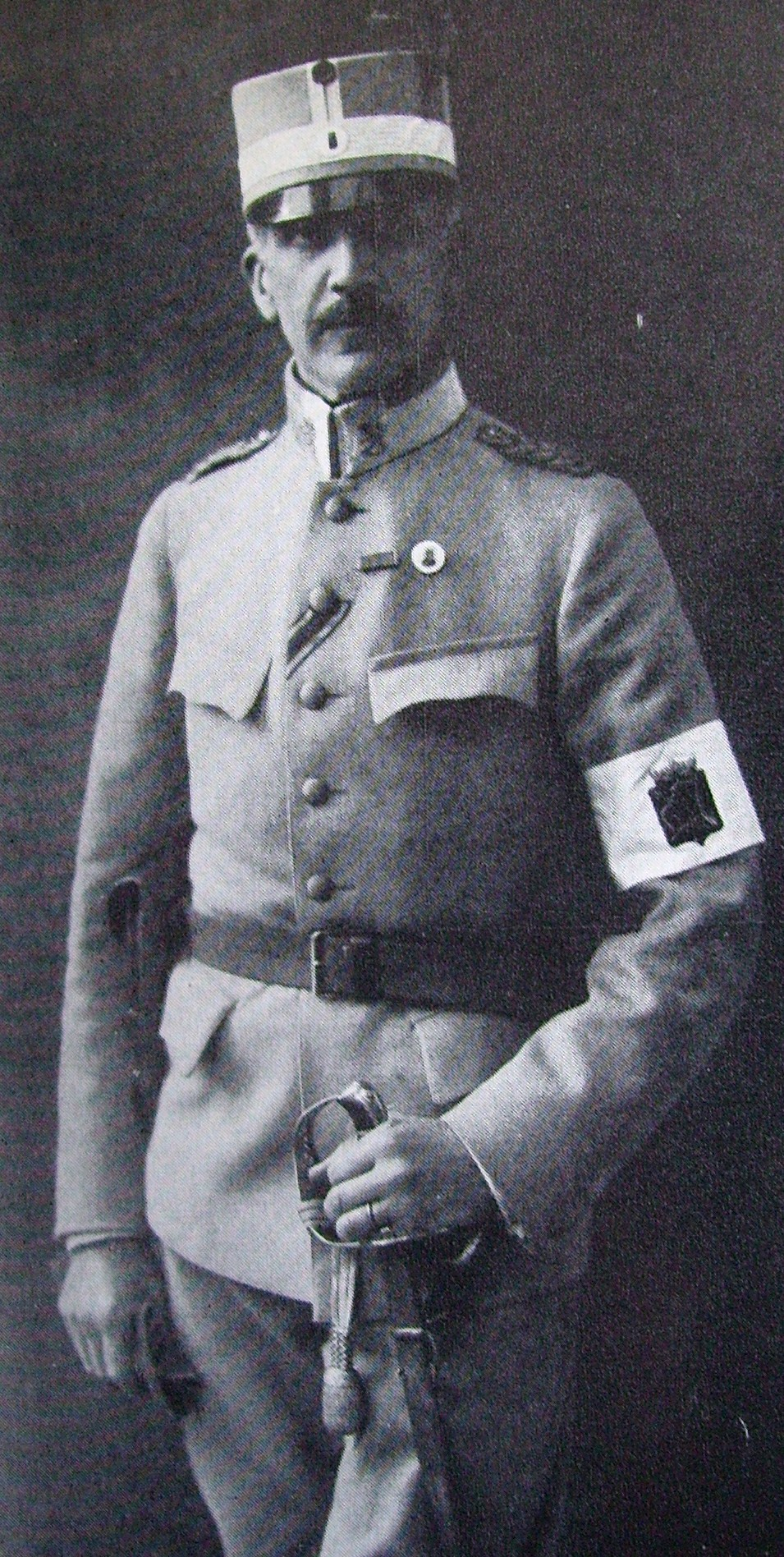
Ernst Linder.

- 16 February – Yngve Holm, sailor (born 1895).
- 26 May – Alice Tegnér, organist and composer, (born 1864).
- 7 September – Mary Karadja, writer, spiritualist and princess (born 1868).
- 14 September – Ernst Linder, general, horse rider (born 1868).
