= 2009 in Sweden =

- Decades: 1980s; 1990s; 2000s; 2010s; 2020s
- See also: Other events of 2009; Timeline of Swedish history

Events from the year 2009 in Sweden

== Incumbents ==
- Monarch – Carl XVI Gustaf
- Prime Minister – Fredrik Reinfeldt

== Events ==
- 1 January – The new Swedish FRA law comes into effect.
- 1 January – New authorities in Sweden will be the Discrimination Ombudsman and the Swedish Transport Agency.
- 1 January – Höganäs municipality introduces, as the second municipality in Sweden, the euro as a parallel currency.
- 5 February – In Sweden, the four party leaders of the agree on the Swedish energy policy, which means that the ban on new construction of nuclear power is lifted.
- 24 February – In Sweden, Crown Princess Victoria and Daniel Westling announce that they are engaged and that the wedding will take place on 19 June 2010.
- 25 March – Sverker Göranson takes office as the new Commander-in-Chief.
- 17 April – In Sweden, the Stockholm district court's verdict against the four defendants in the Pirate Bay trial falls.
- 26 May – Eritrean President Isaias Afewerki declares that there is no intention to release Eritrean-Swedish journalist Dawit Isaak, who has been imprisoned in the country without trial since 2001.
- 16 June – Sweden's Riksdag decides by a vote of 153-150 that Sweden shall abolish general conscription,[12] which has existed since 1901, in peacetime and from 1 July 2010, replace it with voluntary basic military training.'
- 17 June – Member of Parliament Tobias Krantz is appointed as the new Swedish Minister of Higher Education and Research after the departed Lars Leijonborg.
- 1 July – Sweden will be the country holding the presidency of the European Union for the next six months, after the Czech Republic.
- 23 July – The two Gotland ferries M/S Gotland and HSC Gotlandia II collide just outside Nynäshamn, Sweden. 15 passengers are slightly injured.
- 31 July – Six crewmen die when the cargo ship Langeland sinks in Kosterfjorden, Sweden.
- 12 September – The first vaccination against the new flu in Sweden is carried out at a test group in Eskilstuna.
- 23 September – A very spectacular robbery against a safe deposit in Västberga owned by the security company G4S, is carried out with, among other things, a stolen helicopter. See more on the Helicopter robbery.
- 5 October – The UN names Norway as the best country in the world to live in. Sweden is seventh on the list, which means a drop from 2008.
- 1 November – AIK wins the Allsvenskan for men and thus becomes Swedish football champions for the first time in eleven years.

=== Full date unknown ===
- GuidePal company is founded in Stockholm.

== Deaths ==
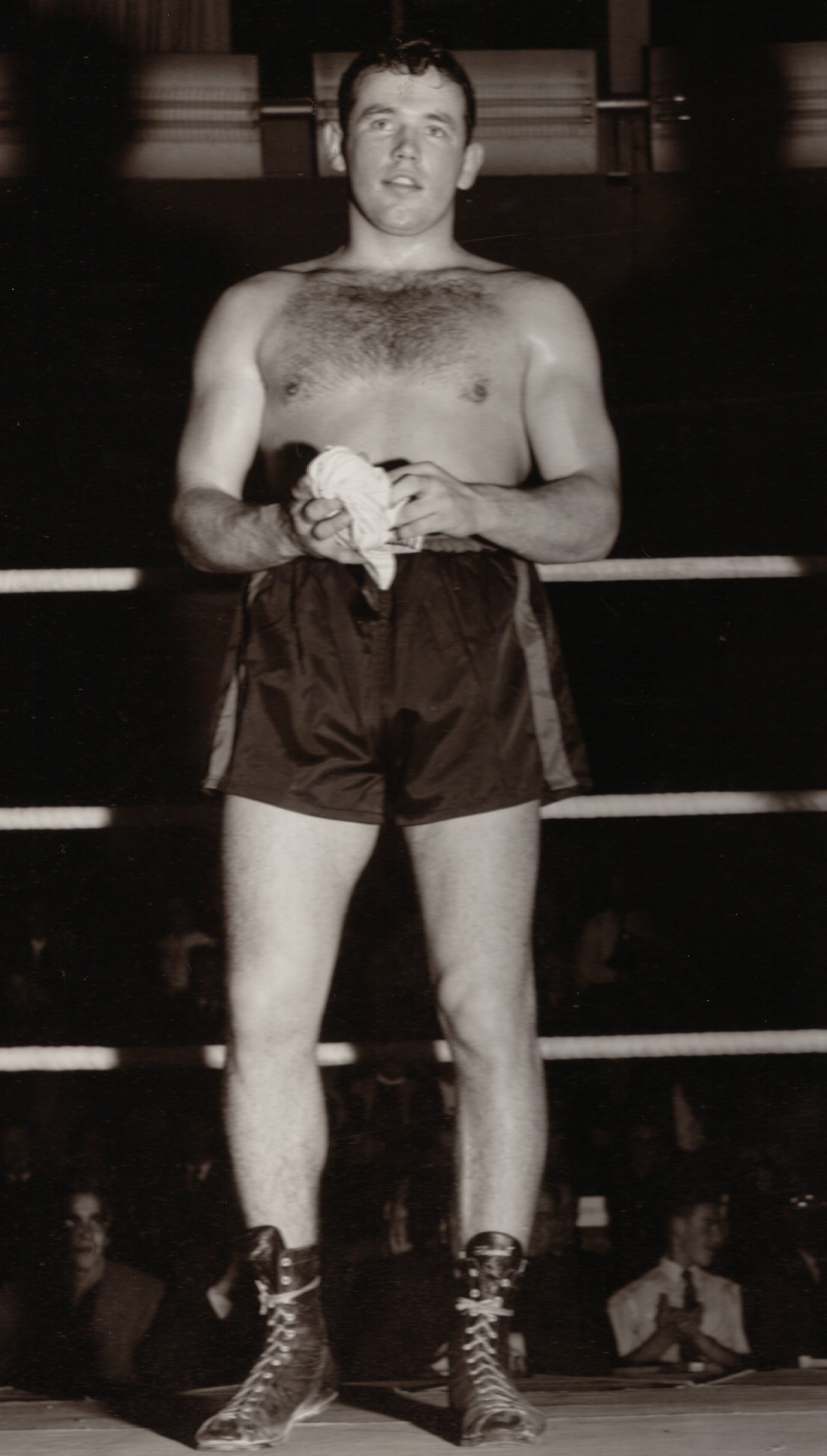
Ingemar Johansson, heavyweight boxing world champion.

- 3 January – Ulf G. Lindén, businessperson (born 1937)
- 13 January – Folke Sundquist, actor (born 1925).
- 15 January – Viking Palm, wrestler, Olympic champion (born 1923).
- 17 January – Anders Isaksson, journalist (born 1943)
- 30 January – Ingemar Johansson, boxer, heavyweight world champion (born 1932)
- 31 January – Erland von Koch, composer (born 1910)
- 31 August – Torsten Lindberg, footballer (born 1917).
- 3 October – Olga Dahl, genealogist (b. 1917)
- 20 November – Elisabeth Söderström, singer (b. 1927)

== See also ==
- 2009 in Swedish television
