= 2007 in Sweden =

- Decades: 1980s; 1990s; 2000s; 2010s; 2020s
- See also: Other events of 2007; Timeline of Swedish history

Events from the year 2007 in Sweden

== Incumbents ==
- Monarch – Carl XVI Gustaf
- Prime Minister – Fredrik Reinfeldt

== Events ==
- Date unknown
  - Bombadil Publishing, a youth-to-youth publishing house is founded.
  - Next House, a house construction company is founded.

== Publications ==
- The Girl Who Kicked the Hornets' Nest, novel by Stieg Larsson.

== Births ==
- 25 January – Elina Gravin, gymnast

== Deaths ==
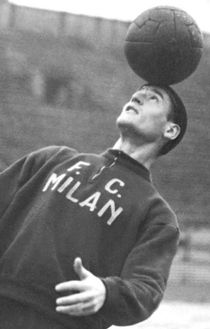
Nils Liedholm had a long career as football player and manager in Italy.

- 27 March – Hans Hedberg, sculptor (born 1917)
- 5 April – Maria Gripe, writer (born 1923)
- 13 April – Birgitta Arman, actress (born 1921)
- 5 November – Nils Liedholm, footballer (born 1922).

== See also ==
- 2007 in Swedish television
