= 2013 in Sweden =

- Decades: 1990s; 2000s; 2010s; 2020s
- See also: Other events of 2013; Timeline of Swedish history

Events from the year 2013 in Sweden

== Incumbents ==
- Monarch – Carl XVI Gustaf
- Prime Minister – Fredrik Reinfeldt

== Events ==
- 7 May: Vatchareeya Bangsuan went missing from her home in Boden. Kim Marie Johansson would later be found responsible for her murder.
- 19 May 2013 Stockholm riots
- 14–18 May: The Eurovision Song Contest 2013 is held in the Malmö Arena in Malmö. The winner is Danish singer Emmelie de Forest with her song Only Teardrops.
- 10–28 July – The UEFA Women's Euro 2013 was held. Germany won the tournament.
- 16 October – Antje Jackelén is appointed the first female Church of Sweden archbishop.
- 5 November – The leader of the Sweden Democrats Jimmie Åkesson is caked at a book signing on Nytorget, Södermalm in Stockholm.

== Deaths ==
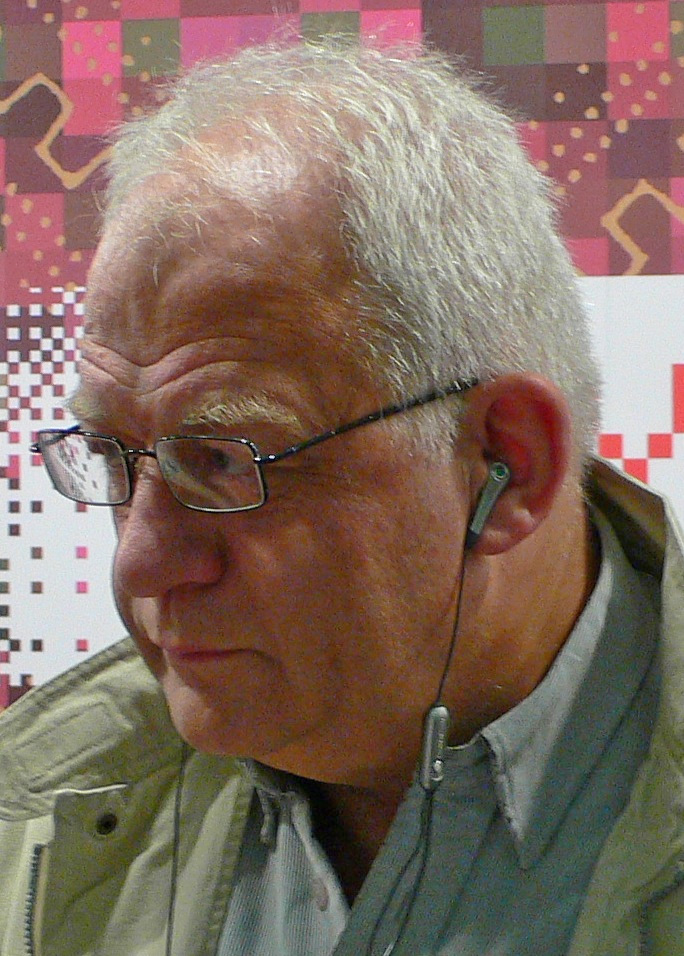
Anders Carlberg in 2007.

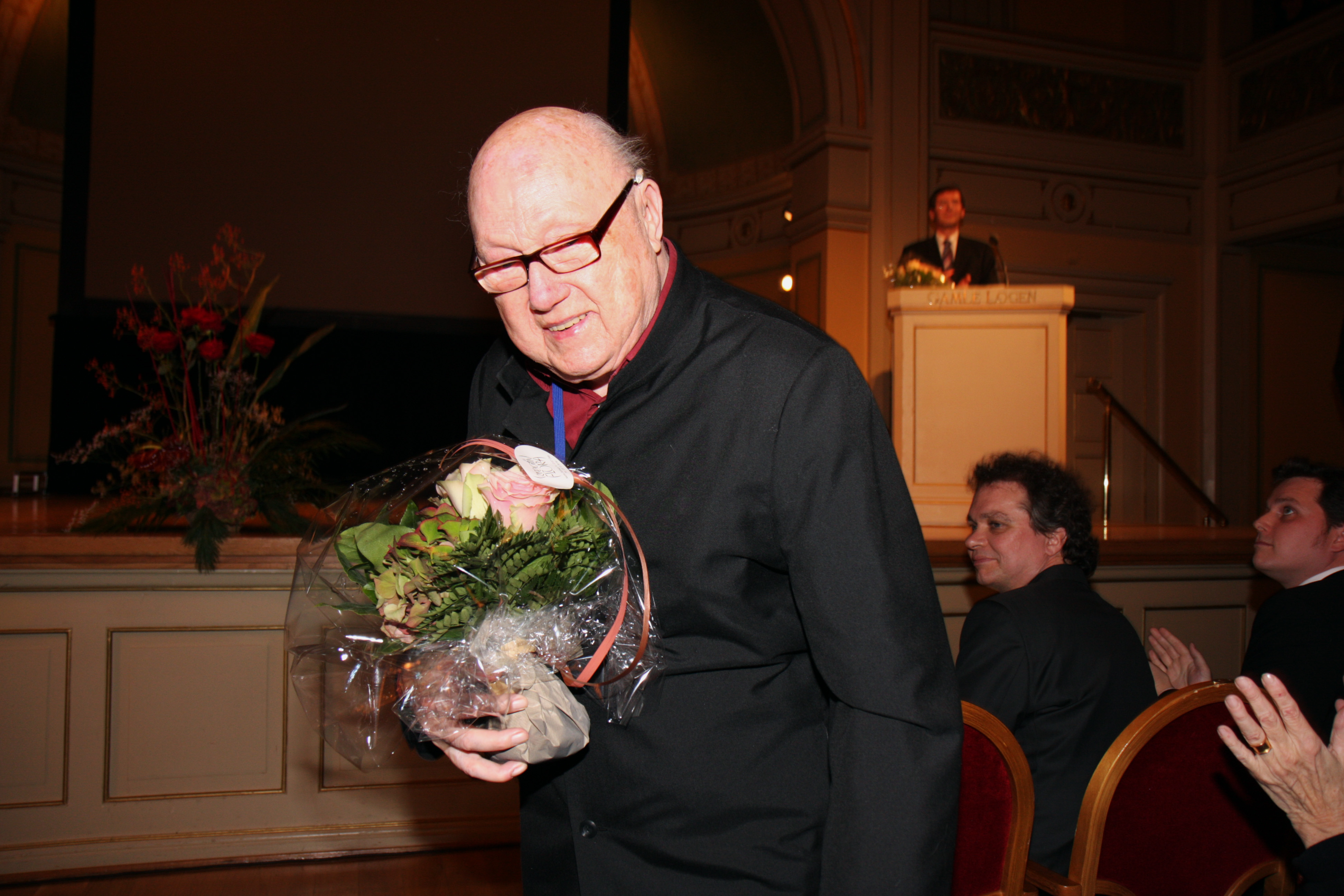
Eric Ericson in 2007.

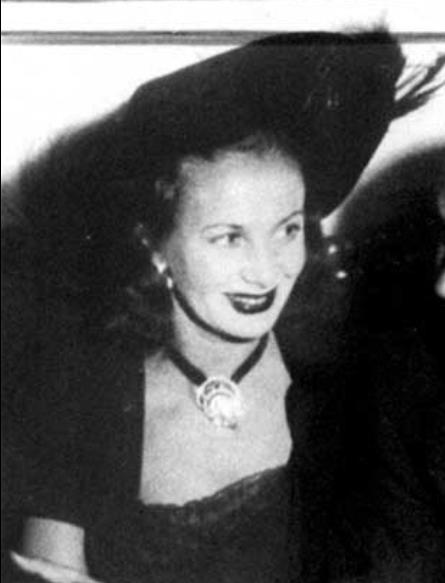
Princess Lilian

- 5 January – Ann-Britt Leyman, athlete (b. 1922).
- 5 January – Anders Carlberg, politician (b. 1943).
- 8 February – Kjell Hjertsson, footballer (b. 1922).
- 16 February – Eric Ericson, conductor (b. 1918).
- 21 February –Hasse Jeppson, footballer (b. 1925).
- 10 March – Princess Lilian, Duchess of Halland (b. 1915).
- 21 March – Jörgen Ohlin, footballer (b. 1937).
- 1 May – Dick Heinegård, biochemist (b. 1942).
- 10 June – Petrus Kastenman, equestrian (b. 1924).

== See also ==
- 2013 in Swedish television
