= 2008 in Sweden =

- Decades: 1980s; 1990s; 2000s; 2010s; 2020s
- See also: Other events of 2008; Timeline of Swedish history

Events from the year 2008 in Sweden

== Incumbents ==
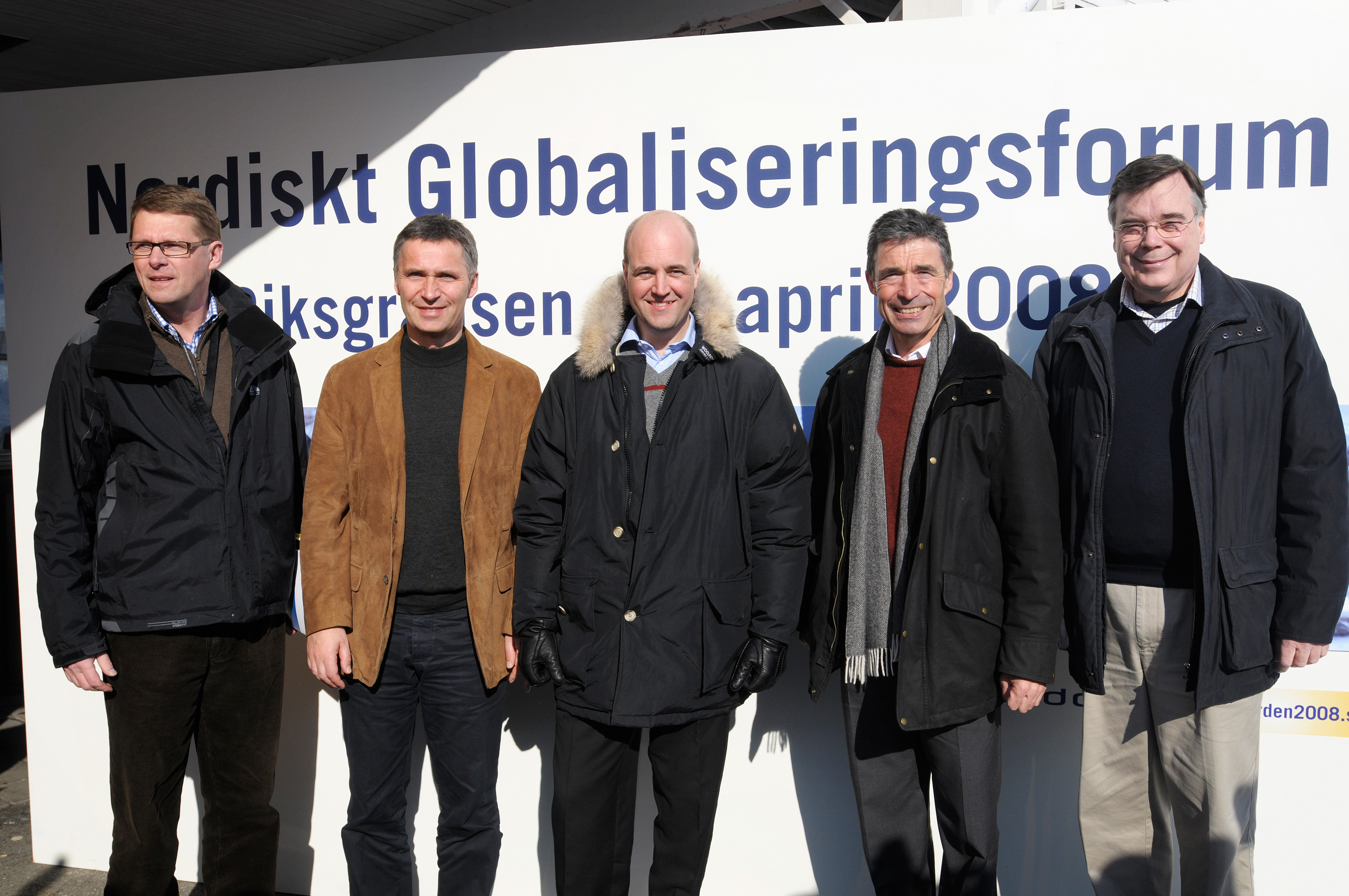
Five Nordic Prime Ministers: (Matti Vanhanen (left) from Finland, Jens Stoltenberg (second left) from Norway, Fredrik Reinfeldt (center) from Sweden, Anders Fogh Rasmussen (second right) from Denmark and Geir Haarde (right) from Iceland) gathered at the Nordic Globalization Forum in Riksgränsen, Sweden, on 8 April 2008.

- Monarch – Carl XVI Gustaf
- Prime Minister – Fredrik Reinfeldt

== Events ==
- 1 October – Rivality strategy game is released.

== Deaths ==
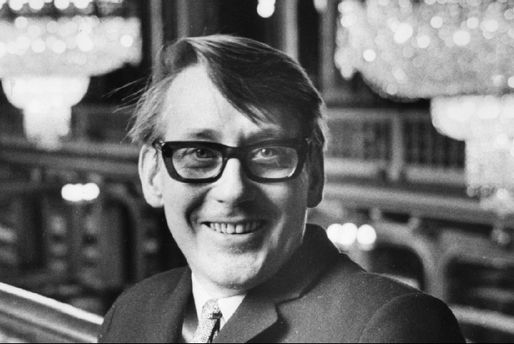
Stig Claesson.

- 4 January – Stig Claesson, writer (born 1928)
- 6 January – Anders Paulrud, writer (born 1951).
- 13 January – Tommy Limby, cross-country skier (born 1947).
- 12 March – Folke Eriksson, water polo player (born 1925).
- 16 March – Ola Brunkert, drummer (born 1946)
- 30 March – Anders Göthberg, guitarist (born 1975)

== See also ==
- 2008 in Swedish television
