= 2010 in Sweden =

- Decades: 1990s; 2000s; 2010s; 2020s
- See also: Other events of 2010; Timeline of Swedish history

Events from the year 2010 in Sweden

== Incumbents ==
- Monarch – Carl XVI Gustaf
- Prime Minister – Fredrik Reinfeldt

== Events ==
- 8,9 June 2010 Rinkeby riots, first significant rioting in an immigrant neighborhood
- 19 September – 2010 Swedish general election was held, it saw the Nationalist Sweden Democrats entering parliament for the first time, as the sixth largest and only non-aligned of the eight parties elected to the parliament, by receiving 5.70 percent of the votes (an increase by 2.77 pp) and 20 seats.

== Deaths ==
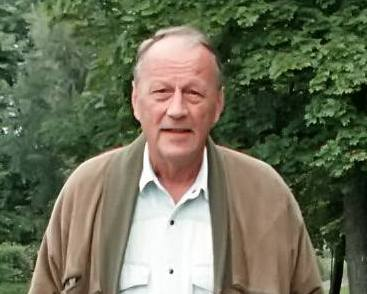
Björn von der Esch, member of the Parliament.

- 10 January – Ulf Olsson, convicted murderer (born 1951)
- 11 February – Bo Holmberg, governor (born 1942).
- 2 March – Emil Forselius, actor (born 1974)
- 10 March – Björn von der Esch, politician (born 1930).
- 11 March – Walter Aronson, bobsledder (born 1917).
- 1 April – Anders Eklund, boxer (b. 1957).
- 9 April – Kerstin Thorvall, author, illustrator and journalist (b. 1925).
- 24 April – Bo Hansson, keyboardist (b. 1943).
