= 2011 in Sweden =

- Decades: 1990s; 2000s; 2010s; 2020s
- See also: Other events of 2011; Timeline of Swedish history

Events from the year 2011 in Sweden

== Incumbents ==
- Monarch – Carl XVI Gustaf
- Prime Minister – Fredrik Reinfeldt

== Events ==
- 23 September: Annie Lööf is appointed chairperson of the Swedish Centre Party, succeeding Maud Olofsson.

== Deaths ==
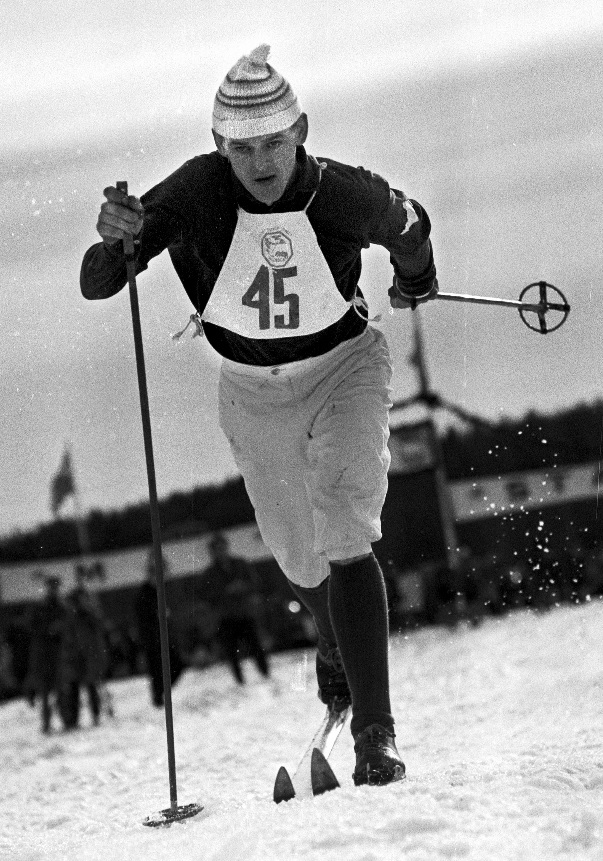
Assar Rönnlund in 1961.

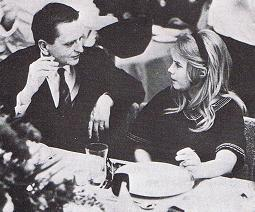
Lena Nyman in 1968, with Olof Palme.

- 5 January – Assar Rönnlund, cross-country skier (born 1935).
- 14 January – Sun Axelsson, novelist (born 1935)
- 26 January – Tore Sjöstrand, runner (born 1921).
- 4 February – Lena Nyman, actress (born 1944)
- 3 March – Lasse Eriksson, comedian (born 1949)
- 5 March – Eivor Alm, cross-country skier (born 1924).
- 10 March – Valter Nyström, runner (born 1915).
- 24 March – Stig Berntsson, sport shooter (born 1930).
- 21 April – Annalisa Ericson, actress (born 1913).
- 7 May – Eilert Määttä, ice hockey player (born 1935).
- 30 May – Ricky Bruch, discus thrower (born 1946).
- 12 July – Kurt Lundquist, sprinter (born 1925).
- 3 August – Ingrid Luterkort, actress and stage director (born 1910)
- 8 August – Kurt Johansson, sport shooter (born 1914).
- 15 August – Sif Ruud, actress (born 1916).
- 2 September – Lennart Magnusson, fencer (born 1924).
- 7 September – Stefan Liv, ice hockey player (born 1980)
- 1 October – Sven Tumba, ice hockey player (born 1931).
- 2 November – Sickan Carlsson, actress (born 1915)
- 15 November – Ingrid Sandahl, gymnast (born 1924).

== See also ==
- 2011 in the European Union
- 2011 in Europe
- 2011 in Swedish television
