= 2012 in Sweden =

- Decades: 1990s; 2000s; 2010s; 2020s
- See also: Other events of 2012; Timeline of Swedish history

Events from the year 2012 in Sweden

== Incumbents ==
=== National level ===
- Monarch - Carl XVI Gustaf
- Prime Minister - Fredrik Reinfeldt

== Births ==
- 23 February – Princess Estelle, Duchess of Östergötland

== Deaths ==
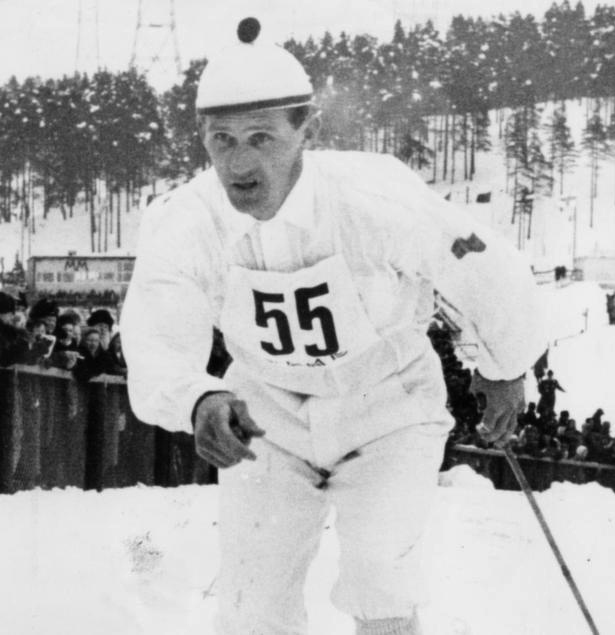
Sixten Jernberg, World champion and Olympic champion in cross country skiing.

- 19 January – Peter Åslin, ice hockey goaltender (b. 1962).
- 5 May – Carl Johan Bernadotte, prince (b. 1916).
- 22 June – Hans Villius, historian and author (b. 1923).
- 14 July – Sixten Jernberg, cross country skier (b. 1929).
- 12 November – Hans Hammarskiöld, photographer (b. 1925).
- 25 November – Lars Hörmander, mathematician (b. 1931).

== See also ==
- 2012 in Swedish television
