= Bombadil =

Bombadil may refer to:

- Tom Bombadil, a character in J. R. R. Tolkien's legendarium
- Bombadil Publishing, a youth-to-youth publishing house in Sweden
- Bombadil (band), a three-piece Americana, folk-pop band
  - Bombadil, Bombadil's first EP
