= Murder of Helén Nilsson =

1989 murder in Sweden

- Date: March 1989
- Location: Hörby, Sweden
- Also known as: Helénmordet
- Participants: Ulf Olsson (perpetrator); Helén Nilsson (victim)
- Deaths: Helén Nilsson
- Suspects: Ulf Olsson
- Verdict: Guilty
- Convictions: April 2005

Ten-year-old Helén Nilsson was the victim in a sadistic murder case (Swedish: Helénmordet) in Hörby, Sweden, in March 1989. The murderer, Ulf Olsson, the so-called Helén man (Swedish: Helénmannen), was convicted in April 2005, having been found after a DNA test in 2004.

Nilsson was abducted on the evening of 20 March 1989. She had decided to meet with two friends outside a grocery store, but they never met. She was found murdered six days later in the woods about 20 kilometres outside Hörby. Police discovered that Nilsson had been alive for a couple of days after the abduction. The murder remained unsolved for the following years and attracted media attention from time to time.

The murderer was first brought to the attention of the police at a private dinner. A police officer mentioned that she was involved with the investigation of the murder and this prompted a remark from one of the guests about a former colleague of hers, Ulf Olsson. Supposedly, there had been a lot of talking going on about Olsson at the time of the murder. The police who received the tip filed it, although it was not enough for an investigation. As a result, however, he would later be included in the group of 29 men who were asked to leave DNA samples.

In December 2004, Olsson was declared guilty and in April the following year he was sentenced to life, even though he had been found mentally ill. The verdict was appealed and the second authority determined the mental condition to be severe enough to warrant psychiatric care.

In the 2020 SVT television series The Hunt for a Killer (Jakten på en mördare) about the murders of Helén Nilsson and Jannica Ekblad, actor Magnus Schmitz played Ulf Olsson.

== Details of the abduction ==
Nilsson had decided to meet two friends of hers outside a grocery store at 19:00, but failing to find them there she had made a short walk around the block. She met a couple of friends of her sister, who informed her about two girls waiting outside the store. Upon looking in that direction, Nilsson and the sister's friends could see the girls leaving the parking lot, and Nilsson ran after them. This is the last known observation of Helén Nilsson. Although the police made major efforts to determine where she had been abducted it could never be determined whether it occurred outside the store or on her way home, or if she had decided to return home after her friends had left her.

Shortly after 20:00 (CET), the time when Nilsson should have returned home, the family was getting worried, since Nilsson's friends had been at her home to ask for her. A search started, and more and more people became involved in looking for Nilsson. At 22:10, the police were informed and over the following days, the disappearance attracted a lot of media attention. Five independent witnesses had seen a young man, 20–25 years old, at the same place and time as Helén disappeared. One of them saw him force a little girl into his car. The witness has confirmed that the man did not look like the convicted man. Over the years, the police team was mainly led by Per-Ake Akesson and Monika Ohled.

== Arrests ==
A number of arrests were made over the years. On 22 March, only two days after the abduction and while the search was still on, a man living in the same area as Nilsson was interrogated by the police and had his home searched. He could not present an alibi but he was never declared a suspect of the crime.

In 2002, the case was reopened with the intention of reviewing all the interrogation transcripts, letters and other available data. One revisited lead consisted of a man who was reported to have attempted a couple of rapes during the 1980s and who lived in the area. He had been with his cousin during the day of Nilsson's disappearing and the two men presented very different views on what they had been doing on that day. During the new investigations, a number of girls who had lived in the area and been 10 years old at some point during the eighties were questioned, and six of them mentioned being harassed or assaulted by the man.

It could be established in 1989, that the two men had been at the grocery store at the same time that Nilsson was in the area and they had been spotted in their car, signalling with full beams and in other aspects behaving "very strange".

Several other observations of the two cousins prompted the investigators to detain the two men in 2002. Eventually, the prosecutor determined that there was no reason to keep them in custody and they were let go.

== Use of new technology ==
A small amount of sperm was found on Nilsson's body and was sent to the forensic laboratory in Linköping. In 1989, however, the techniques used were not advanced enough to be able to get any information out of such small amounts, so the sample was frozen. In 2002, during the reopening of the case, the sample was sent to Forensic Science Service in Birmingham, United Kingdom, and in August 2003, the DNA profile was received.

In April 2004, a group of 29 men that had appeared in the investigation was selected. The purpose was to conduct interrogations and to ask the men to voluntarily provide DNA samples. There were no priority differences within the group apart from the strategy of starting with those living closest. It had been rumoured over the years that confessed, (but later disproved) serial killer Thomas Quick (Sture Bergwall) was involved in the murder and although the police had no interest in him, he was allowed to leave a sample by his own initiative in order to rule him out. A match was reported on 23 June 2004, and Olsson was arrested the same evening.

== See also ==
- Lists of solved missing person cases
