= Lena Smedsaas =

Swedish journalist and writer

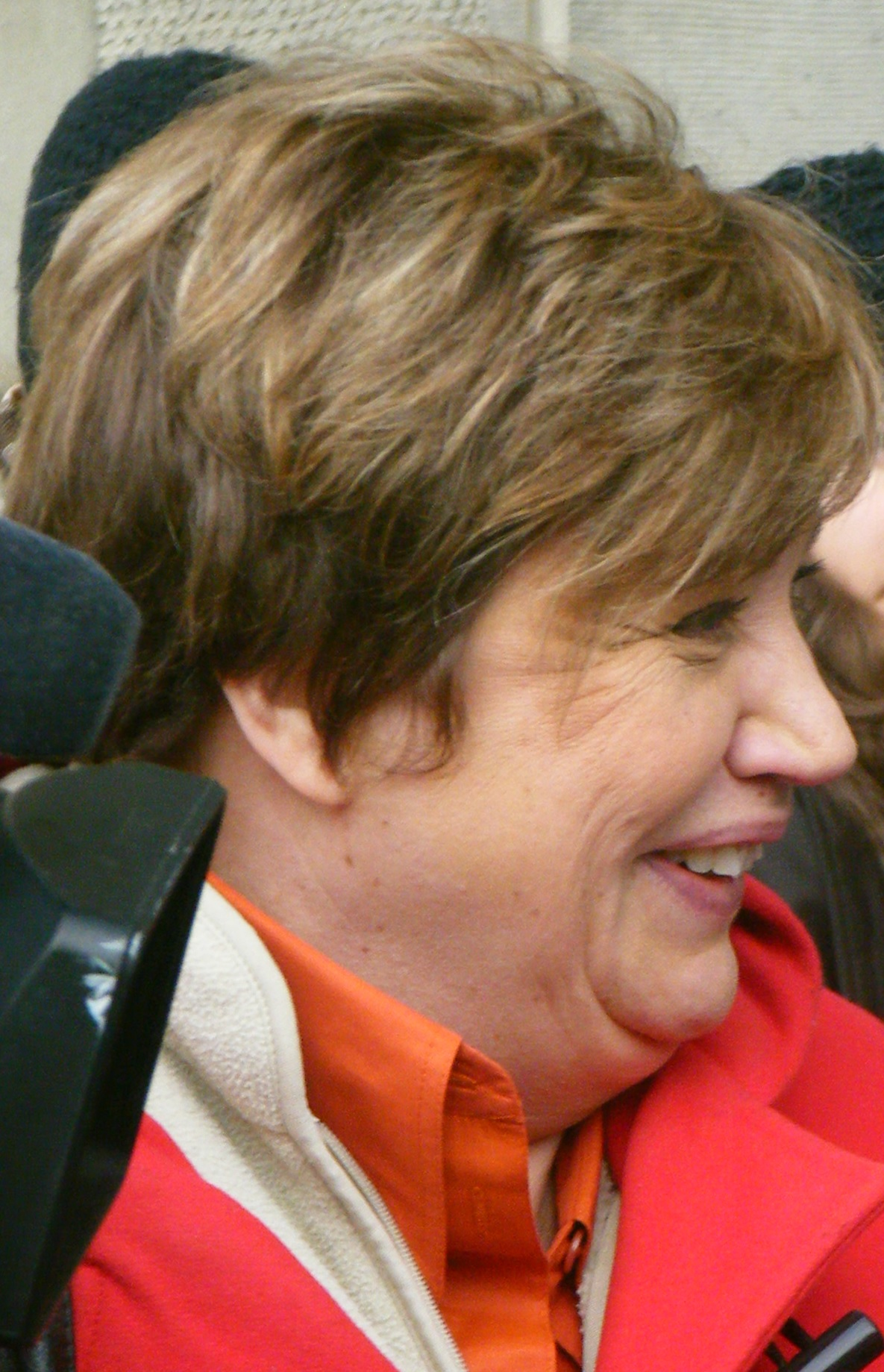
- Lena Smedsaas in February 2009.
- Born: 20 March 1951; Solna Municipality, Sweden
- Died: 6 January 2014 (aged 62); Täby, Sweden
- Occupations: Journalist, writer
- Years active: 1973–2014
- Spouse: Claes-Göran Kjellander (m. 1977)
- Children: 2

Lena Smedsaas (20 March 1951 – 6 January 2014) was a Swedish journalist and writer.

Born in Solna Municipality, she began her career in journalism in 1973 and was best known for being a political commentator, presenter and editor for TV4Nyheterna on TV4.

Lena Smedsaas died from cancer on 6 January 2014, aged 62, in Täby.
