= Dick Heinegård =

Swedish biologist

- Born: 13 June 1942
- Died: 1 May 2013 (aged 71)
- Education: University of Lund (PhD, 1974)
- Scientific career
- Fields: Matrix Biology, Cartilage Research, Biochemistry
- Doctoral advisor: Sven Gardell

Dick Heinegård (13 June 1942 – 1 May 2013) was a Swedish biochemist. He received his doctorate in 1974 at Lund University and later became a professor of medical and physiological chemistry there. His research concentrated on the biology and pathology of connective tissue. Heinegård was elected in 2002 as a member of the Kungliga Vetenskapsakademin.

== Early life and education ==
Heinegård was born in 1943 in Sweden. He pursued his medical studies at the University of Lund, where he also began his research career under the mentorship of Sven Gardell, an established scientist in connective tissue research. In 1970 he spent time at the Kennedy Institute in Helen Muir’s lab. Heinegård completed his PhD in 1974, focusing on the extracellular matrix of tissues, particularly in relation to the musculoskeletal system.

== Career ==
Following his PhD, Heinegård worked at the National Institutes of Health (NIH) in the United States, where he conducted research on aggrecan with Vince Hascall. Their collaboration in 1972/73 established the model for cartilage proteoglycan aggregates and initiated its addition to Dicks early model of cartilage matrix.

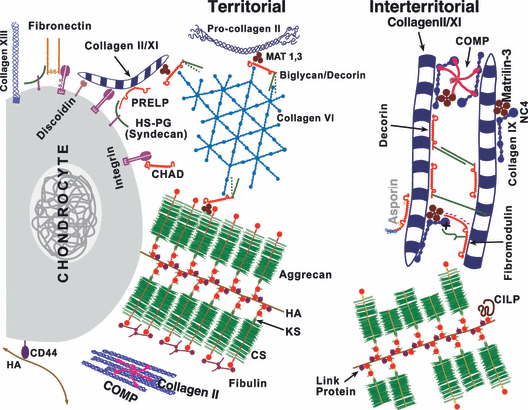
https://onlinelibrary.wiley.com/doi/10.1111/j.1365-2613.2009.00695.x

In 1979, cartilage matrix protein (later re-named matrilin 1) was identified, and its interaction with biglycan/decorin and collagen II determined later. Protein/arginine-Rich End Leucine-rich repeat Protein (PRELP) (territorial) and fibromodulin (interterritorial) arrived in the cartilage matrix in 1986. Chondroadherin (CHAD) that interacts with integrins was identified in 1991 as a 36 kDa protein. Cartilage Oligomeric Matrix Protein (COMP) that interacts with collagens was isolated in 1992, and cartilage intermediate layer protein (CILP) followed a few years later. The final component in Dick’s model was added in 2001 as asporin, a name based on its polyaspartate stretch in its amino terminus.

Over his career, Heinegård published more than 300 research papers and over 50 book chapters and reviews in the fields of biochemistry, connective tissue biology, and pathology.

== Awards and honors ==
Heinegård received the Steindler Award from the Orthopedic Research Society 1996, Lifetime Achievement Award OARSI 2011, the EULAR Award from the European League Against Rheumatism, the Wyeth Priset from Svensk Reumatologisk Förening (SRF) 2006 and the Jahre Prize for medical research in Scandinavia 1993.

== Legacy and memorial ==
Following Heinegård's sudden death on May 1, 2013 the Osteoarthritis Research Society International (OARSI) established the Dick Heinegård European Young Investigator Award to support scientific collaboration and advance research in matrix biology.
