= Rabulist riots =

1838 riots in Stockholm, Sweden

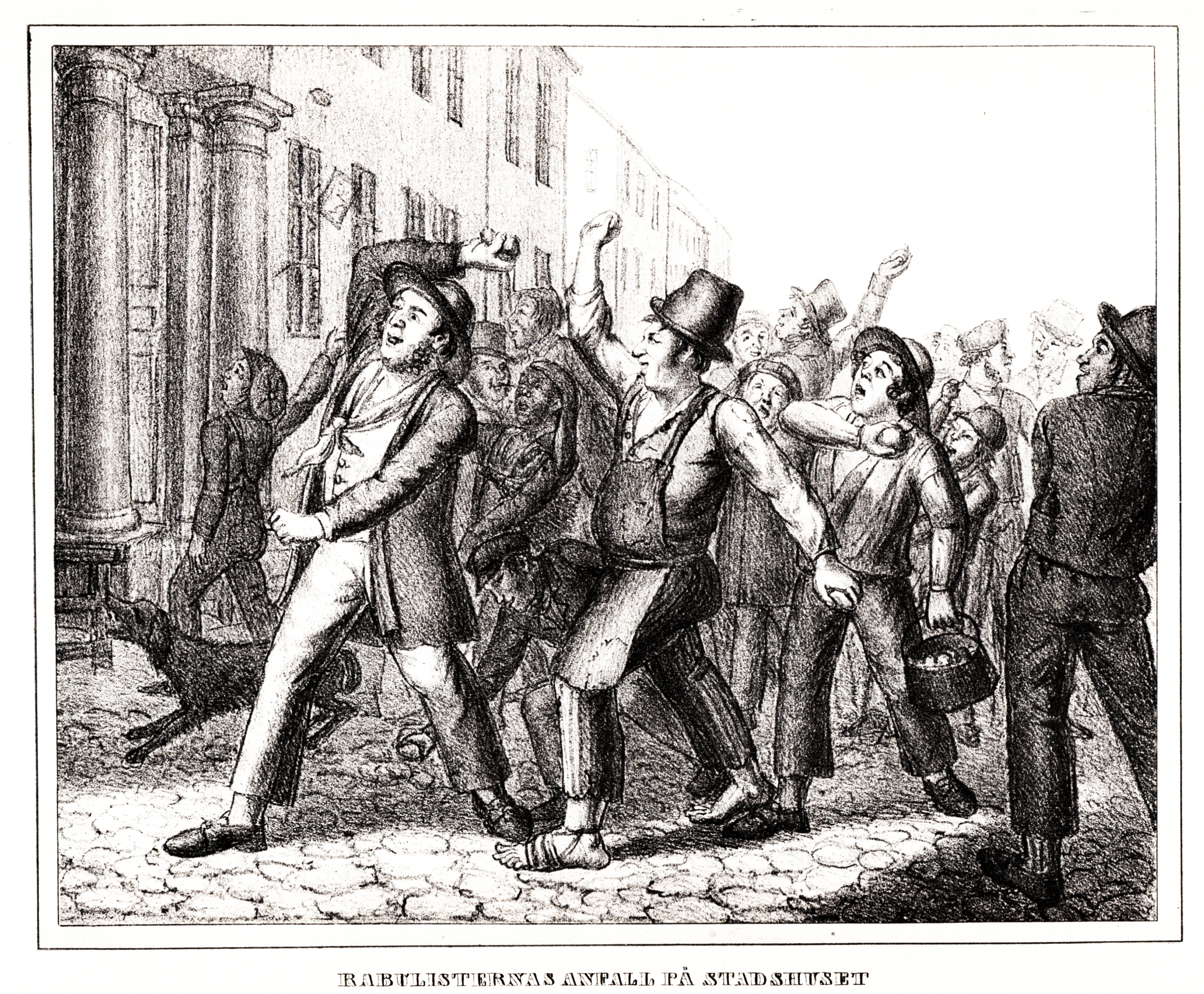
Rabulist riots.

The Rabulist riots or Crusenstolpe riots (Swedish: Crusenstolpe-kravallerna) took place in Stockholm, Sweden, in June 1838 following the Lèse-majesté conviction of the journalist Magnus Jacob Crusenstolpe. "Rabulist" was a derogatory term for political radicals in Sweden at the time. There were some calls for the abdication of King Charles XIV John of Sweden but he survived the controversy and he went on to have his silver jubilee, which was celebrated with great enthusiasm on 18 February 1843.
