= Next House =

Swedish construction company

Next House was a Swedish company working in the field of construction of houses. The company was founded in 2007 by Thomas Mårtensson. Next House was headquartered in Stockholm, but is also present in Russia, Norway, Spain, France, Switzerland, and Luxembourg. In March 2011, Thomas Martensson, CEO of Next House, signed an agreement with the Global 32Group moving Next House's headquarters to Geneva, Switzerland. https://www.nexthouse.se Next House developed, promoted and sold homes until it was sold to 32Group in March 2011

== Background ==
Next House developed, promoted and sold homes until it was sold to 32Group in March 2011. The purpose of the company was to make homes greener and more energy efficient by improving energy use, material selection, and transportation. With the participation of award-winning architects and engineers, Next House had developed a new concept within the construction industry, in which they delivered the homes as well as complete study kits.

== Reception ==
The company received media attention both in Sweden and in international media. Next House has appeared in over 200 articles in newspapers and magazines, and a score of television channels, including the M6 channel, in its Capital Programme. Next House was the third Swedish company, after IKEA and H & M, to appear in the program. In October 2009, Next House was mentioned in several Spanish television channels, where the Spanish Minister of Housing invited Next House to Spain.

Next House was headquartered in Stockholm, but is also present in Russia, Norway, Spain, France, Switzerland, and Luxembourg. In March 2011, Thomas Martensson, CEO of Next House, signed an agreement with the Global 32Group moving Next House's headquarters to Geneva, Switzerland.
