= Anders Paulrud =

Swedish writer and journalist (1951–2008)

Anders Paulrud (14 May 1951 – 6 January 2008) was a Swedish writer and journalist, born in Karlskrona. He died of lung cancer in January 2008.

== Bibliography ==
- Det regnar i Wimbledon (1994)
- Amamamor (1996)
- Inbjudan till sorg (2000) ISBN 91-0-057014-1
- Ett ögonblicks verk (2003) ISBN 91-0-058117-8
- Kärleken till Sofia Karlsson (2005) ISBN 91-0-010610-0
- Som vi älskade varandra (2007) ISBN 91-0-011304-2
- Fjärilen i min hjärna (2008)
