= Ulf Olsson =

Swedish murderer

- Born: Ulf Håkan Olsson; 19 December 1951; Höör, Sweden
- Died: 10 January 2010 (aged 58); Sundsvall, Sweden
- Cause of death: Suicide by hanging
- Other name: Helén man
- Known for: Murder of Helén Nilsson and Jannica Ekblad
- Penalty: Institutional psychiatric care
- Time at large: 15 years, 96 days

Details
- Victims: 2
- Date: 20 March and 4 August 1989
- Country: Sweden
- Location: Scania
- Date apprehended: 24 June 2004

Ulf Håkan Olsson (19 December 1951 – 10 January 2010), also known as Helénmannen (lit. 'the Helén man') was a Swedish murderer. He was convicted for the murders of 10-year-old Helén Nilsson and 26-year-old Jannica Ekblad in 1989. Found after a DNA test in 2004 (a test series including 28 other men), Olsson was convicted and sentenced to psychiatric care in 2005. Although he was first brought to the attention of the police in 2002, he had been in contact with two different police officers through anonymous letters and phone calls since only a couple of months after the murders. The investigation is the second-largest in Swedish history, only surpassed by the investigation of the 1986 assassination of Swedish prime minister Olof Palme.

== Early life ==
Olsson was born on 19 December 1951 in Höör, Malmöhus County, Sweden.

== Murders ==
=== Helén Nilsson ===
10-year-old Helén Nilsson was abducted on the night of 20 March 1989, and she was found murdered six days later. She had been alive for several days after the abduction and had been raped and assaulted. A number of leads were followed over the years but Olsson was not a person of interest to the police until 2002. A police investigator involved with a re-opening of the case was informed of a man (Olsson) who had been suspected by the locals around the time of the murder. The police were informed and in 2004 he was one of 29 men who were asked for a voluntary DNA sample. The test result indicated that Olsson was the murderer with an error probability of one in 43 million.

=== Jannica Ekblad ===
Jannica Ekblad was a victim of prostitution in Malmö. She was found murdered on 4 August 1989, and since Olsson, who was convicted of killing her, claimed he never met her, details about her last hours in life are scarce. She talked to a female friend through her house phone, attempting to have her follow Ekblad and a man to a location outside of Malmö, but the friend was unable to do so. No names were used, but it is believed that the man was Olsson. Ekblad also visited a male friend of hers, who would occasionally provide her with heroin. Ekblad made a short visit and appeared worried. She was seen leaving together with a man and she was not seen again. In 2004, large amounts of Ekblad's blood were found in the summer cottage that belonged to Olsson at the time of the murder. This and other evidence, including identification of his sperm in her vagina, led to his conviction for her murder.

=== Connection between the murders ===
A police technician investigating the two murders was in an early stage convinced that the same killer was responsible for both murders. Although there were clear differences in the two victims, being a young girl and an adult woman in prostitution, other parameters such as the type of location in which the bodies were discovered, the combination of strangulation and massive force against their heads as well as the presence of dog hairs on both bodies, made the investigators suspect there was a connection. Before the evidence against Olsson had been collected in 2004, however, there was no established connection between the murders.

== Time in psychiatric care ==
=== Death ===
At 5:00 am CET on 10 January 2010 Ulf Olsson published a post on his blog where he stated "the best thing for me is simply to be allowed to die, rather than to sit here as a living dead". At approximately 6:15 am CET the same morning Ulf Olsson was found dead by a staff of the psychiatric clinic where he was situated. Officials of the psychiatric clinic confirmed that he had committed suicide by hanging. He left behind one son born after the murders.

== Media ==
In 2020 Ulf Olsson was profiled on the six-part Sveriges Television series The Hunt for a Killer, a series about the murders of Helén Nilsson and Jannica Ekblad. Actor Magnus Schmitz played Olsson. This was broadcast on the BBC in 2021.
