= Ulf G. Lindén =

- Born: 13 December 1937
- Died: 3 January 2009 (aged 71)
- Occupation: entrepreneur
- Known for: Lindén group

Ulf Gösta Lindén (13 December 1937 – 3 January 2009) was a Swedish entrepreneur, owner and president of the Lindén group. The Lindén group is the majority owner of Becker.

Ulf G. Lindén was the CEO of Swedish chemical group Beckers when he was hired by Volvo in 1979. Then, Volvo was the largest corporation in Sweden. Due to his tough management style, Lindén was nicknamed "Pehr G. Gyllenhammar's hitman", especially after his role in turning down Volvo's merger with chemical group Fermenta. Lindén retired from Volvo in 1987 to focus on the Lindén group.
