= Olga Dahl =

Swedish historian and author (1917–2009)

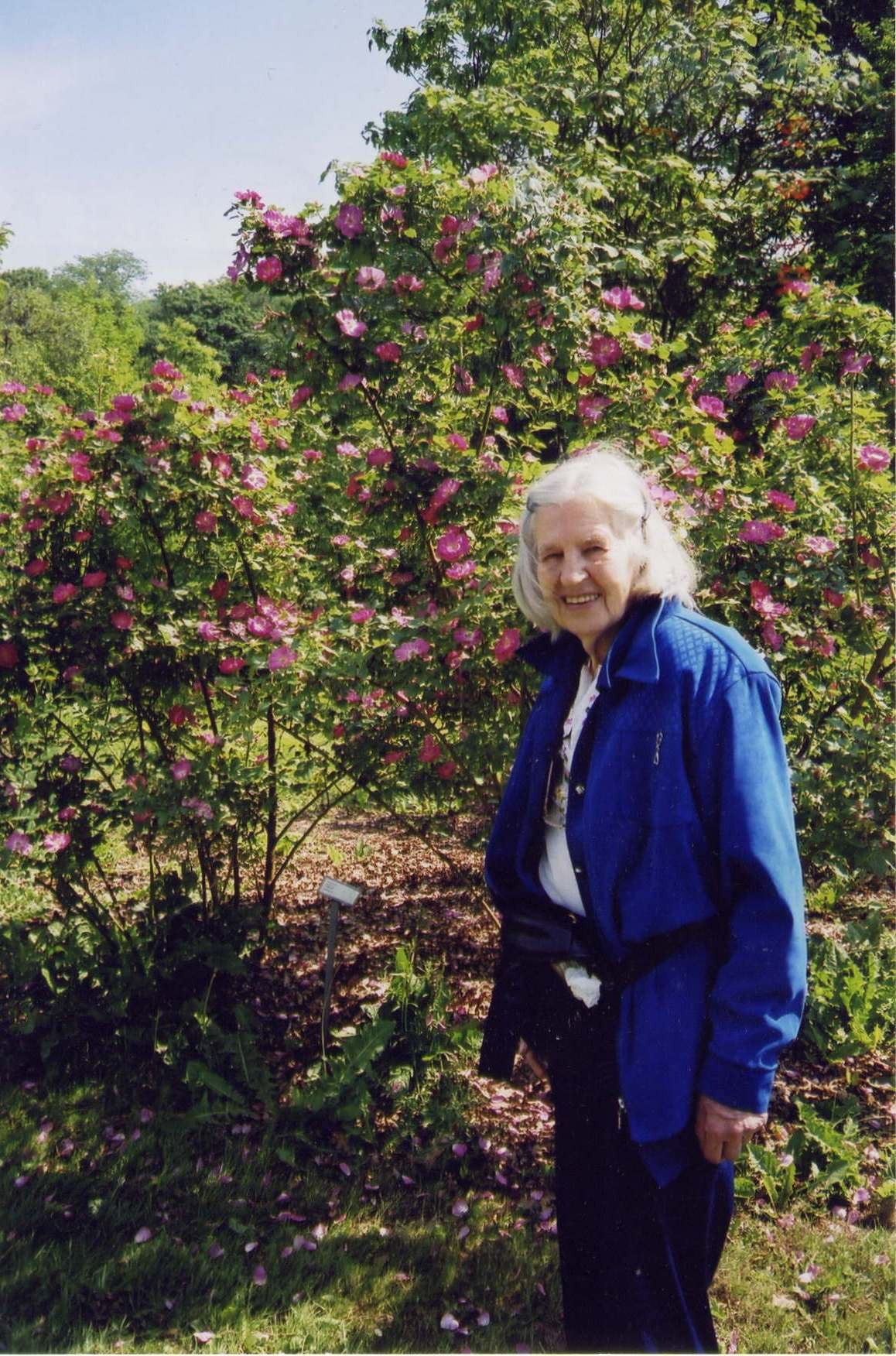
- Dahl in 2003
- Born: Olga Inga Birgitta Ström; 20 September 1917; Malmö, Sweden
- Died: 3 October 2009 (aged 92); Gothenburg, Sweden
- Burial place: Örgryte Old Cemetery
- Education: Lund University
- Occupations: Historian and genealogist
- Known for: History of Gothenburg, Sweden
- Spouse: Sven Dahl
- Children: 4, including Östen

Olga Inga Birgitta Dahl (née Ström; 20 September 1917 – 3 October 2009) was a Swedish city and family historian. She carried out solid basic research in the National Archives on Gothenburg's root division exploring with great significance the city's personal and building history during the 17th and 18th centuries.

== Career ==
Olga Inga Birgitta Ström got involved early in Sweden's student-led temperance movement and in the 1940s she wrote articles promoting temperance policies.

She received her bachelor's degree in geography, law and economics from Lund University. In the early 1950s she worked as a freelance consumer issue journalist for the women's magazine Husmodern. After having moved to Gothenburg she began studying family history, and published a series of articles. In the late 1970s she wrote about the 1600s and 1700s in a book about Gothenburg, Göteborgs hjärta – en bok om människor, affärer och byggnader kring Kungsgatan (The heart of Gothenburg – a book about people, things, and buildings around Kungsgatan), with several other researchers and writers, including Per Clemensson, who wrote about the period 1775–1875, and Sven Gulin, who is listed as the editor. The work was the result of Olga Dahl's research work over several decades.

On her 90th birthday Olga Dahl witnessed her crowning achievement with the public opening of a database, "Göteborgs tomtägare 1637–1807", which details around 900 properties in central Gothenburg and their owners over the two-century period.

Dahl was a member of the Gothenburg Regional genealogical society from the 1950s onward, and was a local writer for Svenskt biografiskt lexikon (Swedish Biographical Dictionary). She taught several hundred amateur researchers the basic skills of genealogy and also gave courses in local history. She died in Gothenburg on 3 October 2009.

== Family ==
Olga Inga Birgitta Ström was born to Ernst Ström and Mimmi (née Norlander) in Malmö. She was married to Sven Dahl, who was a professor of geography at Gothenburg School of Business, Economics and Law. He died in 1979. Together they had four children: Östen, born in 1945; Gudrun, born in 1948; Ingolf, born in 1950; and Åslög, born in 1955. She is buried with her husband at the family gravesite in Örgryte Old Cemetery.
