= Stig Berntsson =

Swedish sports shooter

Personal information
- Born: 19 October 1930 Gothenburg, Sweden
- Died: 24 March 2011 (aged 80) Kungsbacka, Sweden

Sport
- Sport: Sports shooting

Stig Berntsson (19 October 1930 – 24 March 2011) was a Swedish sports shooter. He competed at the 1960 Summer Olympics, 1964 Summer Olympics and the 1968 Summer Olympics. His greatest run was at the 1960 Olympics, where he scored #11 in Shooting.
