= Magnus Jacob Crusenstolpe =

Swedish historian (1795–1865)

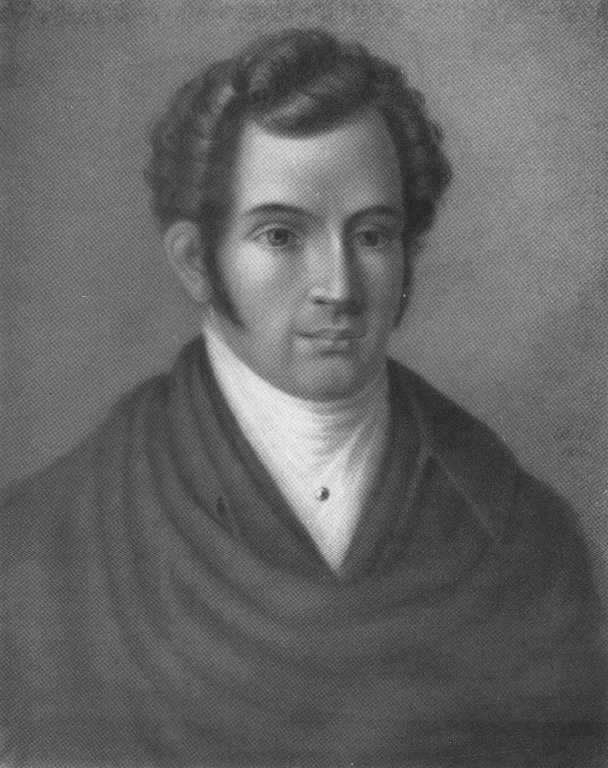
Magnus Jacob Crusenstolpe in 1824

Magnus Jacob Crusenstolpe (11 March 1795, Jönköping – 18 January 1865, Stockholm) was a Swedish historian. He became famous both as a political and a historical writer early in his career.

Crusenstolpe won considerable distinction with a series of historical-romantic tales, (Little Stories) but his fame rests mainly on his works as a journalist, historian, biographer, and politician. His works of fiction become to a degree political or progressive (see for example The House of Holstein-Gottorp in Sweden).

== Biography ==
Crusenstolpe obtained a great influence over King Charles XIV, who during the years 1830 to 1833 gave him his fullest confidence, and sanctioned the official character of Crusenstolpe's newspaper Fäderneslandet. In 1833, however, the historian suddenly became the king's bitterest enemy, and used his acrid pen on all occasions in attacking him. In 1838 he was condemned for one of these angry utterances to be imprisoned three years in the Vaxholm Castle on the charge of lèse-majesté, culminating in the Rabulist riots. He continued his literary labours until his death in 1865. Few Swedish writers have wielded so pure and so incisive a style as Crusenstolpe, but his historical work is vitiated by political and personal bias.

== Works ==
Crusenstolpe's first important work was a History of the Early Years of the Life of King Gustavus IV Adolphus (1837), which was followed by a series of monographs and by some politico-historical novels, of which The House of Holstein-Gottorp in Sweden is considered the best, the 5th volume of which was published in 1844.
