= GuidePal =

GuidePal, Inc.
- Company type: Limited liability company
- Industry: Travel Services
- Founder: Mattias Borg, Dan Willstrand, Robert Mellberg
- Headquarters: New York, NY, United States
- Area served: Worldwide
- Products: City guides
- Website: www.guidepal.com

GuidePal is a mobile app that makes it possible for content creators to earn money by recommending their favorite places and experiences to their followers – without the involvement of brands or advertisers.

GuidePal was founded in 2021. The company's head office is based in New York, United States.

== Overview ==
GuidePal provides a platform for creators to monetize content through direct fan engagement without using advertisements.

ALL GUIDEPAL USERS

• Browse and preview guides from different creators

• Each guide contains up to 15 recommendations with photos, videos, text, quotes, and audio.

• Unlock full access to any guide through in-app purchases ($1.99 USD)

• Save liked guides and recommendations in a folder on your profile, so you can revisit them later

• Explore the places you discover on a map

CREATORS

• guide editor tool used to create guides to your interests

• Easily share your guides to your followers on your social media channels

• As people start to pay to unlock full access to your guides, you can monitor your earnings & stats on your dashboard and insights page

To start creating your own guides, you need a personal invitation or you can apply in the app to become a GuidePal creator.
