= Kim Marie Johansson =

Swedish murderer

Kim Marie Johansson (born Karl Kristoffer Johansson, 29 April 1991) is a Swedish convicted murderer who killed and dismembered Vatchareeya Bangsuan, Johansson's ex girlfriend. On 22 January 2014, she was sentenced to 14 years in prison, although the sentence was reduced to 10 years on appeal later that year.

== Murder of Vatchareeya Bangsuan ==
On 7 May 2013, 20-year-old Vatchareeya Bangsuan went missing. Two weeks later, body parts were found scattered in the forest.

Vatchareeya Bangsuan, from Boden, was studying to get a master degree in engineering from Luleå University of Technology, was about to get a driver's license, and was about to get a new karate belt the day after she disappeared. Johansson, Bangsuan's boyfriend of the time, participated in her search and pretended to be very worried.

Traces of blood were later found in the home and car of Johansson. It was learned that Johansson had also killed and dismembered a pet dog. Justice proved that Kim Marie (at the time, Kristoffer) Johansson had stabbed Bangsuan in the heart and lungs with a knife-like object. Johansson presumably then cut up her body and hid parts in several different places.

On 20 May, Missing People found body parts in a desolate house in Mjösjöberget. Body parts were found in an abandoned house in Mjösjöberget and surrounding areas, others in the woods of Gammelängsberget, but Bangsuan's hands were never found.

It was also learned that Johansson had killed and cut up a pet dog, its dismembered body found scattered in the woods of Gammelängsberget. The town was shocked and residents protested at numerous public demonstrations. The case is considered the most serious in Norrbotten's criminal history and had enormous media coverage in Sweden and Norway. On 23 May 2013, Kim Marie (then Kristoffer) was arrested. On 22 January 2014, the court imposed a sentence to prison for murder on the 22-year-old Johansson who was sentenced to 14 years in prison, although on appeal later that year the conviction was downgraded to manslaughter and the sentence was reduced to 10 years.

Johansson was imprisoned in Norrtäljeanstalten, where prison management considered the prisoner to be extremely violent. Johansson had 34 formal warnings for refusing to work and unauthorized possession of tablets. Authorities said Johansson displayed a strong interest in weapons, war, and explosives and had diminished emotional functioning, with an inflexible thought pattern, vulnerability to stress, and difficulty in social interaction.

== Gender reassignment ==
In 2018, 27-year-old Johansson declared that she now identified as a woman, changing her name to Kim Marie Johansson. Johansson said that she had felt she was a girl since she was five years old, but that it took her several years to realize why she was the way she was and felt the way she felt. She said she would feel better in a women's prison as she was not comfortable around men and was scared of them. Johansson applied to serve the remainder of her sentence in Hinseberg women's prison, a request which was first rejected and then granted by the Swedish Prison and Probation Service and she was transferred. This meant that Johansson moved from a Class 1 maximum security institution to a Class 2 lower security institution with women.

At that time she was reported to the police for threatening to kill a prison guard. As a prisoner, Johansson opened an Instagram account under the name Magdala Johansson and uploaded photos of artwork of, for example, a drawing of severed hands and of the rifle with text announcing plans to "kill the TERF" (from Trans Exclusionary Radical Feminist). The latter was an apparent reference to journalist Kajsa Ekis Ekman, who had written an article in the Swedish newspaper Aftonbladet, that criticized the transfer of Johansson to a women's prison.

In 2020, Johansson was prosecuted for threatening Cissi Wallin.

In 2022, four young men were charged with beating up Johansson, but were acquitted in court.

== In media ==
A documentary about her case, In the Head of a Murderer – Kim Marie Johansson, was shown on TV3 Dokumentär.
