= Bombadil Publishing =

Swedish publishing house

Bombadil Publishing is a youth-to-youth publishing house, founded in Sweden in 2007 by Marianne Rugård-Järvstråt. It operates on a franchise basis and has branches in many countries.

The company publishes both fiction and non-fiction books written by and for pre-teens, teenagers, and young adults (ages 12–26). It uses mentors and tutors, rather than traditional editors, to assist the authors in creating a quality book, and organises searches for promising authors as well as finding them through social media. The authors themselves design the covers and write the back-cover text.

Books are marketed and sold under the single Bombadil Publishing brand, but the company is a franchise operation and has offices in many countries, including the US, the UK, India, and Latin America. After the company's foundation in 2007, major expansion began early in 2008, with eleven countries being added in November that year alone and the number of authors rising from several hundred to over 50,000 by the end of the year and to over 200,000 by the end of 2010. As of February 2010, Bombadil was publishing in 28 languages; as of September 2010, it had authors in 90 countries. Some books are published in multiple languages. Authors receive a 20% share of the price of each book sold.

The books are primarily sold on the publisher's website and advertised by word-of-mouth, although in some cases they can be bought in shops; in 2011 the company was negotiating with IKEA and ICA to have some books sold at their stores.

In El Salvador, Bombadil had difficulty securing promised token government payments to authors and in 2012 had to abandon a claim for reimbursement for 10,000 books ordered by a government ministry that were not paid for. One of the Swedish companies was put into administration on 17 February 2011 in Örebro District Court, Sweden.
