= Anders Carlberg =

Swedish socialist politician, social worker and writer

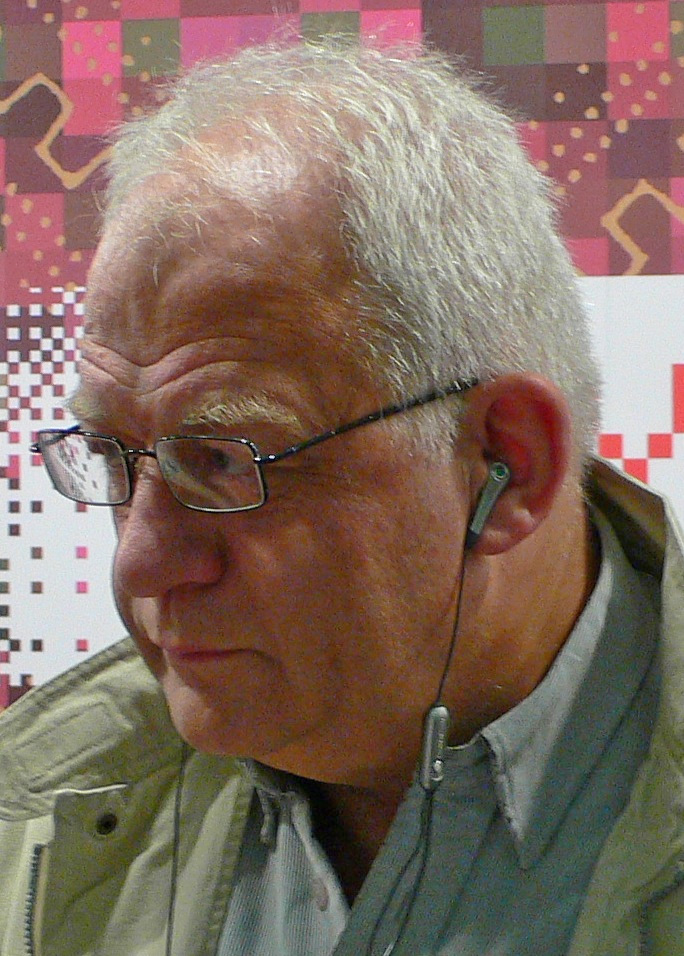
Anders Carlberg in 2007

Anders Erik Carlberg (8 July 1943 – 5 January 2013) was a Swedish socialist politician, social worker and writer.

== Life ==
Anders Carlberg was born in Stockholm, Sweden, in 1943. He became active in the political left, and was the leader of the Swedish Young communists in 1967–1970. In that capacity, he played a prominent role in the Occupation of the Student Union Building in 1968. In the early 1980s, however, Carlberg became a member of the then-ruling Swedish Social Democratic Party.

In 1984, Carlberg co-founded the Fryshuset, the activity center for young people in Stockholm, Sweden, offering social projects and educational programs. In 2000, Carlberg was awarded H. M. The King's Medal, 8th size, for his social projects and educational programs. Anders Carlberg died in 2013 in Stockholm after a brief illness at the age of 69.

Since 2016, Fryshuset has annually awarded the Anders Carlberg Memorial Prize to honour the memory of Anders Carlberg and highlight outstanding role models who embody his spirit.
