= Anders Isaksson =

Swedish journalist, writer, and historian

Rolf Anders Isaksson (9 May 1943 – 17 January 2009) was a Swedish journalist, writer, and historian, possibly best known for his four-volume biography of Swedish social democratic politics and Prime Minister Per Albin Hansson's life.

Isaksson was born in Piteå in northern Sweden, and worked for many years as a reporter, and foreign correspondent for radio and television. He was a syndicated columnist at the Dagens Industri business paper, worked for Business Week and worked as an opinion editor for the Dagens Nyheter. In 1987, Isaksson was awarded the Swedish Stora Journalistpriset ("Great Journalist Award"). Isaksson died just before his latest book Kärlek och krig. Revolutionen år 1809 ("Love and war. The Revolution of 1809") would be published. In the book, which was his last, Isaksson tells the story of the fall of the Swedish Empire and army commander Georg Adlersparre's life.

Isaksson was married to the former Senior Administrative Head-officer, Mona Danielsson, who served as Chief Officer of the Swedish Government's Gender Equality Unit at the Industry Ministry until 19 May 2000.

== Bibliography ==
- Per Albin. Del 1: Vägen till folkhemmet (1985), ISBN 91-46-15026-9
- Per Albin. Del 2: Revolutionären (1990), ISBN 91-46-15295-4
- Per Albin. Del 3: Partiledaren (1996), ISBN 91-46-16886-9
- Per Albin. Del 4: Landsfadern (2000), ISBN 91-46-17683-7
- När pengarna är slut - välfärden efter välfärdsstaten (1992)
- Alltid mer, aldrig nog - om medborgaren, staten och välfärden (1994)
- Politik och politiker - krönikor från ett epokskifte (1996)
- Den politiska adeln - Politikens förvandling från uppdrag till yrke (2002)
- Den politiska adeln (2006 reviderad och utökad upplaga)
- Kollegiet för sysselsättande av de arbetslösa - Riksrevisionen om arbetsmarknadspolitiken (2006), ISBN 91-7566-628-6
- Ebbe - mannen som blev en affär (2007), ISBN 91-85555-03-7
