= History of Sweden =

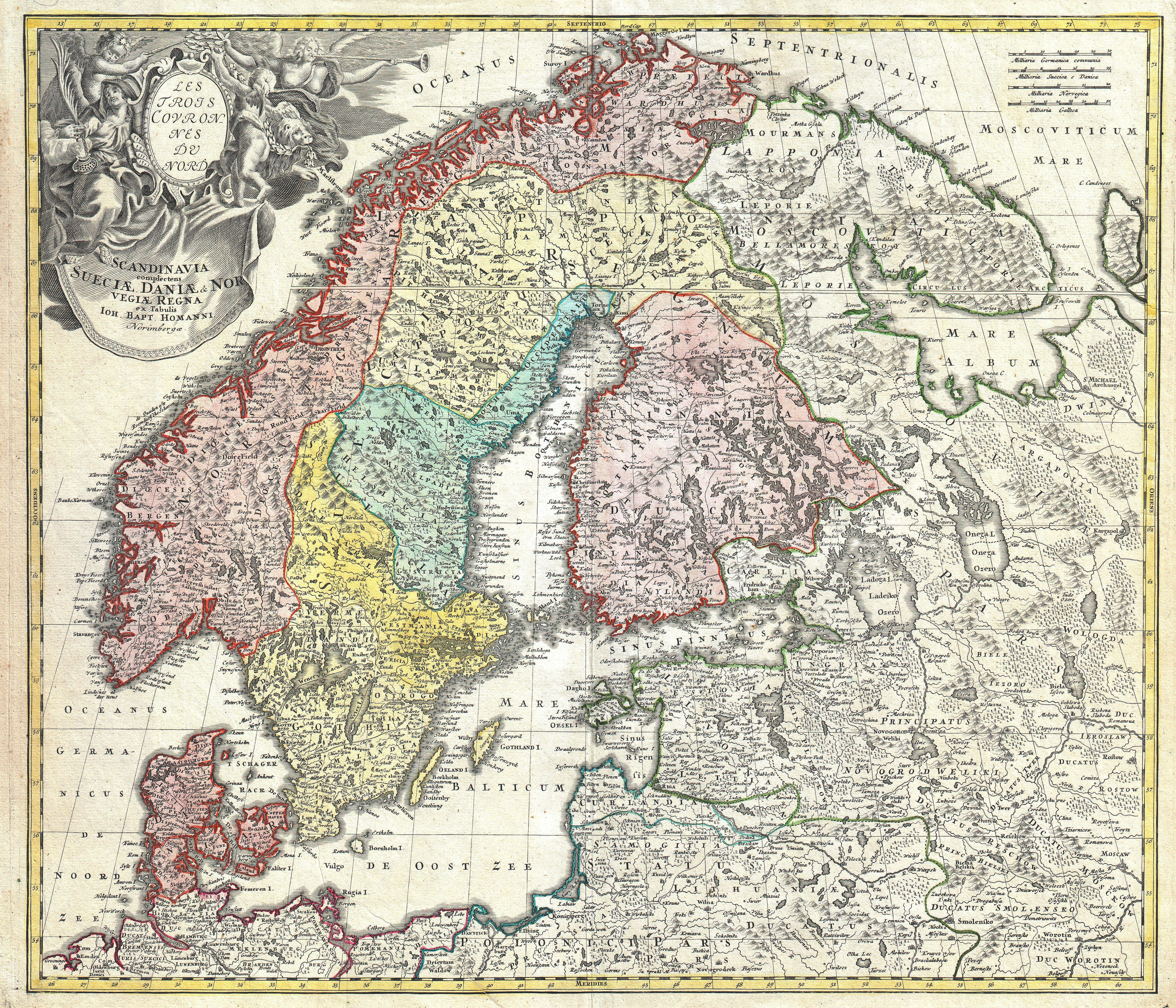
Homann's map of the Scandinavian Peninsula and Fennoscandia with their surrounding territories: northern Germany, northern Poland, the Baltic region, Livonia, Belarus, and parts of Northwest Russia. Johann Baptist Homann (1664–1724) was a German geographer and cartographer; map dated around 1730.

The history of Sweden can be traced back to the melting of the Northern polar ice cap. From as early as 12000 BC, humans have inhabited this area. Throughout the Stone Age, between 8000 BC and 6000 BC, early inhabitants used stone-crafting methods to make tools and weapons for hunting, gathering and fishing as means of survival. Written sources about Sweden before AD 1000 are rare and short, usually written by outsiders. It is usually accepted that Swedish recorded history, in contrast with pre-history, starts around the late 10th century, when sources are common enough that they can be contrasted with each other.

The modern Swedish state was formed over a long period of unification and consolidation. Historians have set different standards for when it can be considered complete. Some common laws were present from the second half of the 13th century. At this time, Sweden consisted of most of what is today the southern part of the country (except for Scania, Blekinge, Halland and Bohuslän), as well as parts of modern Finland. Over the following centuries, Swedish influence would expand into the North and East.

In the late 14th century Sweden, Denmark and Norway were united in the Kalmar Union. During the following century, a series of rebellions lessened Sweden's ties to the union, sometimes even leading to the election of a separate Swedish king. The fighting reached a climax following the Stockholm Bloodbath in 1520, a mass execution of accused heretics orchestrated by Christian II of Denmark. One of the few members of the most powerful noble families not present, Gustav Vasa, was able to raise a new rebellion and eventually was crowned King in 1523. His reign proved lasting and marked the end of Sweden's participation in the Kalmar Union. Gustav Vasa furthermore encouraged Protestant preachers, finally breaking with the papacy and establishing the Lutheran Church in Sweden, seizing Catholic Church property and wealth.

During the 17th century, after winning wars against Denmark–Norway, Russia, and the Polish–Lithuanian Commonwealth, Sweden emerged as a great power by taking direct control of the Baltic region. Sweden's role in the Thirty Years' War determined the political and religious balance of power in Europe. The Swedish Empire expanded enormously into the modern Estonia and Latvia, northern Germany, and several regions that to this day are part of Sweden.

Before the end of the 17th century, a secret alliance was formed between Denmark–Norway, Poland–Lithuania, and Russia against Sweden. This coalition acted at the start of the 18th century when Denmark–Norway and Poland launched surprise attacks on Sweden. In 1721, Russia and its allies won the war against Sweden. As a result, Russia was able to annex the Swedish territories of Estonia, Livonia, Ingria, and Karelia. This effectively put an end to the Swedish Empire, and crippled her Baltic Sea power. Sweden joined in the Enlightenment culture of the day in the arts, architecture, science, and learning. Between 1570 and 1800, Sweden experienced two periods of urban expansion. Finland was lost to Russia in a war in 1808–1809.

In the early 19th century, Finland and the remaining territories outside the Scandinavian Peninsula were lost. Sweden's last war was the Swedish–Norwegian War (1814). Sweden was victorious in this war, leading to the Danish king being forced to cede Norway to Sweden. Norway was then forced to enter into a personal union with Sweden that lasted until 1905. Since 1814, Sweden has been at peace, adopting a non-aligned foreign policy in peacetime and neutrality in wartime. During World War I, Sweden remained neutral, but let the Germans travel in the country. Post-war prosperity provided the foundations for the social welfare policies characteristic of modern Sweden. During World War II, Sweden once again remained neutral, avoiding the fate of occupied Norway.

The country attempted to stay out of alliances and remain officially neutral during the entire Cold War, and declined to join NATO. The social democratic party held government for 44 years (1932–1976). The 1976 parliamentary elections brought a liberal/right-wing coalition to power. During the Cold War, Sweden remained neutral. The neutrality policy was dropped in 2022, in response to the Russian invasion of Ukraine, and Sweden formally became a member of NATO in March 2024.

== Prehistoric Sweden before AD 800 ==
Sweden has a large number of petroglyphs (hällristningar in Swedish), with the highest concentration in the province of Bohuslän and the northern part of the county of Kalmar, also called "Tjust". The earliest images can be found in the province of Jämtland, dating from 5000 BC. They depict wild animals such as elk, reindeer, bears and seals. 2300–500 BC was the most intensive carving period, with carvings of agriculture, warfare, ships, domesticated animals, etc. Petroglyphs with themes have also been found in Bohuslän, dating from 800 to 500 BC.

== Viking Period and Middle Ages: 800–1500 ==
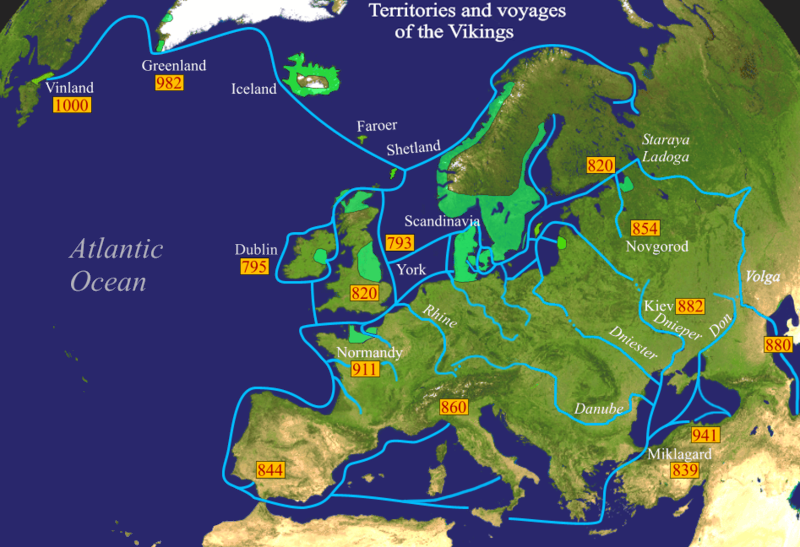
Viking expeditions (blue): depicting the immense breadth of their voyages throughout most of Europe, the North Atlantic and the Mediterranean

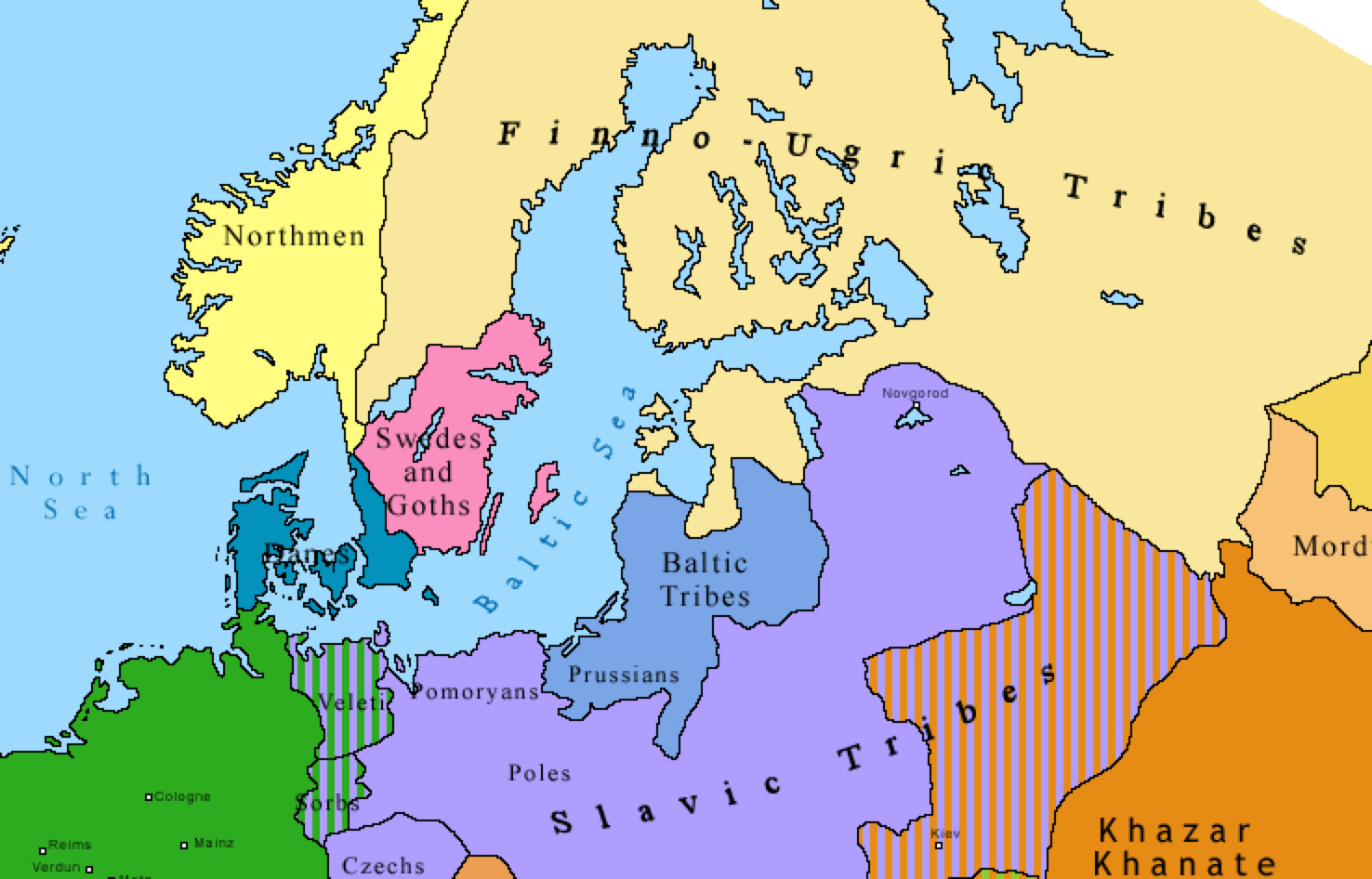
Swedish tribes in Northern Europe in 814

For centuries, the Swedes were merchant seamen well known for their far-reaching trade. During the 11th and 12th centuries, Sweden gradually became a unified Christian kingdom that later included Finland. Until 1060, the kings of Uppsala ruled most of modern Sweden except for the southern and western coastal regions, which remained under Danish rule until the 17th century. After a century of civil wars, a new royal family emerged, which strengthened the power of the crown at the expense of the nobility, while giving the nobles privileges such as exemption from taxation in exchange for military service. Sweden never had a fully developed feudal system, and its peasants were never reduced to serfdom. Vikings from Sweden took part in the raids of the Western and Southern regions of Europe, but mainly traveled east to Russia, Constantinople and the Muslim world (Serkland). The large Russian mainland and its many navigable rivers offered good prospects for merchandise and plundering. During the 9th century, extensive Scandinavian settlements began on the east side of the Baltic Sea.

The conversion from Norse paganism to Christianity was a complex, gradual, and at times violent (see Temple at Uppsala) process. The main early source of religious influence was England, due to interactions between Scandinavians and Saxons in the Danelaw, and with Irish missionary monks. German influence was less obvious in the beginning, despite an early missionary attempt by Ansgar, but gradually emerged as the dominant religious force in the area, especially after the Norman conquest of England. Despite the close relations between Swedish and Russian aristocracy (see also Rus'), there is no direct evidence of Orthodox influence.

Around the year 1000, Olof Skötkonung became the first known king to rule both Svealand and Götaland. Historical details about some of the early medieval kings are obscure, and even the dates of their reigning periods remain unclear. In the 12th century, Sweden was undergoing dynastic struggles between the Erik and Sverker clans. Svealand and the Swedes were usually more supportive of the Erik dynasty and Götaland and Geats more supportive of the Sverker dynasty, which wanted friendlier relations with Denmark. This further divided the country between parties because the ruler was not clear. The country elected their king from each district by selecting 12 people from the local nobles, who then elected the king at the Stones of Mora. The divide ended when a third clan married into the Erik clan and founded the Bjälbo dynasty. This dynasty gradually consolidated Sweden to a strong state.

During the early Middle Ages, the Swedish kingdom also expanded to control Norrland and Finland. This expansion sparked tension with the Russian states, a tension that was to continue throughout Swedish history.

In 1319, Sweden and Norway were united under King Magnus Eriksson, who was the paternal grandson of King Magnus Ladulås of Sweden and the maternal grandson of King Haakon V of Norway. On 21 July 1336, Magnus was crowned king of Sweden and Norway in Stockholm. In 1332 the lands of the eastern Danish provinces, which included Scania, Blekinge and Ven were sold to King Magnus from Duke Johan of Holstein (who had received the provinces from the Danish king), after the local population expressed dissatisfaction with Duke Johan and stated they would rather be ruled by the Swedes. The Duke started negotiations with the Swedes and it was agreed that the Swedish king would redeem the pledge for 34,000 marks of silver (6 432 kilo).

After the Black Death and internal power struggles in Sweden, Queen Margaret I of Denmark (the former daughter-in-law of King Magnus Eriksson) united the Nordic countries in the Union of Kalmar in 1397, with the approval of the Swedish nobility.

== Early Modern Sweden: 1523–1611 ==
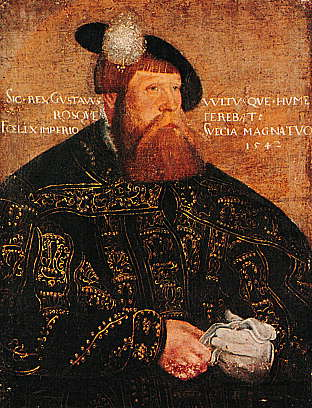
Gustav Vasa (Gustav I) in 1542

In the 16th century, Gustav Vasa (1496–1560) crushed an attempt to restore the Union of Kalmar, thereby laying the foundation for modern Sweden. At the same time, he broke with the papacy and established the Lutheran Church in Sweden.

The Union's final disintegration in the early 16th century brought on a long-lived rivalry between Norway and Denmark on one side and Sweden on the other. The Catholic bishops had supported Christian II of Denmark, but he was overthrown by Gustav Vasa, and Sweden became independent again. Gustavus used the Protestant Reformation to curb the power of the church and was crowned as King Gustavus I in 1523. In 1527, he persuaded the Riksdag of Västerås (comprising the nobles, clergy, burghers, and freehold peasants) to confiscate church lands, which comprised 21% of the farmland. Gustavus took the Lutheran reformers under his protection and appointed his men as bishops. Gustavus suppressed aristocratic opposition to his ecclesiastical policies and efforts at centralisation.

Tax reforms took place in 1538 and 1558, whereby multiple complex taxes on independent farmers were simplified and standardised throughout the district; tax assessments per farm were adjusted to reflect an ability to pay. Crown tax revenues increased, but more importantly, the new system was perceived as fairer and more acceptable. A war with Lübeck in 1535 resulted in the expulsion of the Hanseatic traders, who previously had had a monopoly of foreign trade. With its own businessmen in charge, Sweden's economic strength grew rapidly, and by 1544 Gustavus controlled 60% of the farmlands in all of Sweden. Sweden now built the first modern army in Europe, supported by a sophisticated tax system and government bureaucracy. Gustavus proclaimed the Swedish crown hereditary and the house of Vasa ruled Sweden (1523–1654) and Poland (1587–1668).

== Rise as a Great Power ==
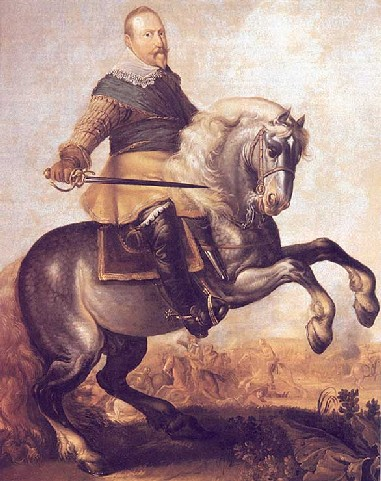
Gustavus Adolphus, victor at the Battle of Breitenfeld (1631)

The Swedish Empire, 1560–1815

During the 16th and 17th centuries, the kings demanded ever increasing taxes and military conscription, emphasising the need for defense. However the money and manpower were used for offensive warfare. Indeed, when there seemed to be a real threat of invasion in 1655–1660, King Charles X Gustav asked the people to give more and to manage their own defences. Finally a balance was reached that provided a well supplied aggressive foreign policy. During the 17th century, after winning wars against Denmark, Russia, and Poland, Sweden (with scarcely more than 1 million inhabitants) emerged as a great power by taking direct control of the Baltic region, which was Europe's main source of grain, iron, copper, timber, tar, hemp, and furs.

Sweden had first gained a foothold on territory outside its traditional provinces in 1561, when Estonia opted for vassalage to Sweden during the Livonian War. While, in 1590, Sweden had to cede Ingria and Kexholm to Russia, and Sigismund tried to incorporate Swedish Estonia into the Duchy of Livonia, Sweden gradually expanded at the eastern Baltic during the following years. In a series of Polish–Swedish War (1600–1629) and the Russo-Swedish Ingrian War, Gustavus Adolphus retook Ingria and Kexholm (formally ceded in the Treaty of Stolbovo, 1617) as well as the bulk of Livonia (formally ceded in the Treaty of Altmark, 1629).

Sweden's role in the Thirty Years' War determined the political as well as the religious balance of power in Europe. From bridgeheads in Stralsund (1628) and Pomerania (1630), the Swedish army advanced to the south of the Holy Roman Empire, and in a side theater of the war deprived Denmark–Norway of Danish Estonia, Jämtland, Gotland, Halland, Härjedalen, Idre and Särna, became exempt from the Sound Dues, and established claims to Bremen-Verden, all of which was formalised in the Treaty of Brömsebro (1645). In 1648, Sweden became a guarantor power for the Peace of Westphalia, which ended the Thirty Years' War and left her with the additional dominions of Bremen-Verden, Wismar and Swedish Pomerania. From 1638 Sweden also held the colony of New Sweden, along the Delaware River in North America.

=== Sweden as a Great Power 1648–1721 ===
In 1655, in the Second Northern War, Charles X Gustav of Sweden invaded and occupied western Poland–Lithuania, the eastern half of which was already occupied by Russia. The rapid Swedish advance became known in Poland as the Swedish Deluge. The Grand Duchy of Lithuania became a Swedish fief, the Polish–Lithuanian regular armies surrendered and the Polish King John II Casimir Vasa fled to the Habsburgs. The Deluge lasted for five years and took a great toll on Poland and Lithuania, with some historians crediting this invasion as the start of the downfall of Polish-Lithuanian Commonwealth. The country was devastated, treasures stolen, and insurmountable loss of lives occurred.

Christina, Queen of Sweden, David Beck, ca. 1650

After a war against Denmark–Norway, Sweden was able to establish control of the Eastern bank of the Sound, formalised in the Treaty of Roskilde (1658). Denmark–Norway was forced to give up a third of its territory to save the rest, the ceded lands comprising Blekinge, Bornholm, Bohuslän, Scania and Trøndelag, as well as Halland. Sweden gained recognition of her southeastern dominions by the European great powers in the Treaty of Oliva (1660); but Sweden was barred from further expansion at the Southern coast of the Baltic. Sweden came out of the Scanian War with only minor losses largely due to France forcing Sweden's adversaries into the treaties of Fontainebleau (1679) (confirmed at Lund) and Saint-Germain (1679).

The following period of peace allowed Charles XI of Sweden to reform and stabilise the realm. He consolidated the finances of the Crown by the great reduction of 1680; further changes were made in finance, commerce, national maritime and land armaments, judicial procedure, church government and education.

=== The Great Northern War: 1700 ===
Russia, Saxony–Poland, and Denmark–Norway pooled their power in 1700 and attacked the Swedish Empire. Although the young Swedish King Charles XII (1682–1718; reigned 1697–1718) won spectacular victories in the early years of the Great Northern War, most notably in the stunning success against the Russians at the Battle of Narva (1700), his plan to attack Moscow and force Russia into peace proved too ambitious.

The Russians won decisively at the Battle of Poltava in June 1709, capturing much of the exhausted Swedish army. Charles XII and the remnants of his army were cut off from Sweden and fled south into Ottoman territory, where he remained three years. He overstayed his welcome, refusing to leave until the Ottoman Empire joined him in a new war against Tsar Peter I of Russia. He established a powerful political network in Constantinople, which included even the mother of the sultan. Charles's persistence worked, as Peter's army was checked by Ottoman troops. However, Turkish failure to pursue the victory enraged Charles and from that moment his relations with the Ottoman administration soured. During the same period, the behavior of his troops worsened and turned disastrous. Lack of discipline and contempt for the locals soon created an unbearable situation in Moldavia. The Swedish soldiers behaved badly, destroying, stealing, raping, and killing. Meanwhile, back in the north, Sweden was invaded by its enemies; Charles returned home in 1714, too late to restore his lost empire and impoverished homeland; he died in 1718. In the subsequent peace treaties, the allied powers, joined by Russia and Great Britain-Hanover, ended Sweden's reign as a great power. Russia now dominated the north. The war-weary Riksdag asserted new powers and reduced the crown to a constitutional monarchy, with power held by a civilian government controlled by the Riksdag. A new "Age of Liberty" opened, and the economy was rebuilt, supported by large exports of iron and lumber to Britain. The Riksdag developed into an active parliament. This tradition continued into the nineteenth century, laying the basis for the transition towards a modern democracy.

The reign of Charles XII (1697–1718) has stirred up great controversy. Historians have puzzled over why this military genius overreached and greatly weakened Sweden. Although most early-19th-century historians tended to follow Voltaire's lead in bestowing extravagant praise on the warrior-king, others have criticised him as a fanatic, a bully, and a bloodthirsty warmonger. A more balanced view suggests a highly capable military ruler whose oft-reviled peculiarities seemed to have served him well, but who neglected his base in Sweden in pursuit of foreign adventure. Slow to learn the limits of Sweden's diminished strength, a party of nobles, who called themselves the "Hats", dreamed of revenge on Russia and ruled the country from 1739 to 1765; they engaged in wars in 1741, 1757, Russian influence grew in Sweden after the war in 1741 which greatly affected politics in the Swedish realm (though much of this influence was lost in 1790 as a result of the Russo-Swedish war of 1788–1790).

=== Enlightenment ===
Gustav III, 1780s

Sweden joined in the Enlightenment culture of the day in the arts, architecture, science, and learning. A new law in 1766 established for the first time the principle of freedom of the press, a notable step towards liberty of political opinion. The Academy of Science was founded in 1739 and the Academy of Letters, History, and Antiquities in 1753. The outstanding cultural leader was Carl Linnaeus (1707–1778), whose work in biology and ethnography had a major impact on European science.

Following half a century of parliamentary domination came the reaction from the monarchy. King Gustav III (1746–1792) came to the throne in 1771, and in 1772 led a coup d'état, with French support, that established him as an "enlightened despot", who ruled at will. The Age of Freedom and party politics was over. Precocious and well-educated, he became a patron of the arts and music. His edicts reformed the bureaucracy, repaired the currency, expanded trade, and improved defense. The population had reached two million and the country was prosperous, although rampant alcoholism was a growing social problem. Gustav III weakened the nobility and promoted numerous major social reforms. He felt the Swedish monarchy could survive and flourish by achieving a coalition with the newly emerged middle classes against the nobility. He personally disliked the French Revolution but decided to promote additional anti-feudal reforms to strengthen his hand among the middle classes.

After Gustav made war on Russia and did poorly, he was assassinated by a conspiracy of nobles who were angry that he tried to restrict their privileges for the benefit of the peasants. Under the successor, King Gustav IV, Sweden joined various coalitions against Napoleon but was badly defeated and lost much of its territory, especially Finland and Pomerania. The king was overthrown by the army, which in 1810 decided to bring in one of Napoleon's marshals, Jean Bernadotte, as the heir apparent.

==== Colonies and slavery ====
Sweden experimented briefly with overseas colonies, including "New Sweden" in Colonial America and the "Swedish Gold Coast" in present-day Ghana, which began in the 1630s. Sweden purchased the small Caribbean island of Saint Barthélemy from France in 1784, then sold it back in 1878; the population had included slaves until they were freed by the Swedish government in 1847.

==== Early urbanisation ====
Between 1570 and 1800, Sweden experienced two periods of urban expansion, c. 1580–1690 and in the mid-18th century, separated by relative stagnation from the 1690s to about 1720. The initial phase was the more active, including an increase in the percentage of urban dwellers in Stockholm – a pattern comparable to increasing urban populations in other European capital and port cities – as well as the foundation of a number of small new towns. The second period of urban growth began around 1750 in response to shifts in Swedish trade patterns from the Baltic to the North Atlantic. It was characterised by increasing populations in the small towns of the north and west.

== 19th century ==
=== Gustavian era ===
The history of Sweden from 1772 to 1809 is better known as the Gustavian era (Swedish: Gustavianska tiden) of kings Gustav III and Gustav IV Adolf, as well as the reign of King Charles XIII.

=== Loss of Finland: 1809 ===
Finland was lost to Russia in a war that lasted from February 1808 to September 1809. As a result of the peace agreement, Finland became a Grand Duchy and thus was officially ruled by the Tsar of Russia though it was not strictly part of Russia. Humanitarian aid from England did not succeed in preventing Sweden from adopting more Napoleon-friendly policies after the Swedish coup d'état in 1809.

=== Union with Norway: 1814 ===
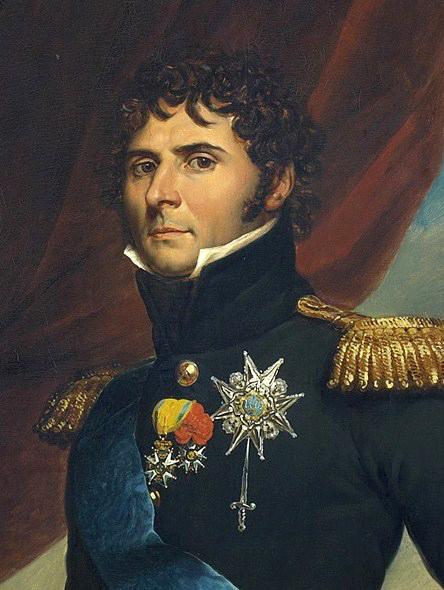
The Swedish Crown Prince Charles John (Bernadotte), who staunchly opposed Norwegian independence, only to offer generous terms of union.

Map of Sweden-Norway

In 1810, French Marshal Jean-Baptiste Bernadotte, one of Napoleon's top generals, was elected as Charles XIV John of Sweden (1818–44) by the Riksdag. He had a Jacobin background and was well-grounded in revolutionary principles, but put Sweden in the coalition that opposed Napoleon. In 1813, his forces joined the allies against Napoleon and defeated the Danes at Bornhöved. In the Treaty of Kiel, Denmark ceded mainland Norway to the Swedish king. Norway, however, declared its independence, adopted a constitution and chose a new king. Sweden invaded Norway to enforce the terms of the Kiel treaty in the last war Sweden has fought. After brief fighting, the peace established a personal union between the two states. Even though they shared the same king, Norway was largely independent of Sweden, except Sweden controlled foreign affairs. The king's rule was not well received and when Sweden refused to allow Norway to have its own diplomats, Norway rejected the King of Sweden in 1905 and selected its own king.

During Charles XIV's reign, the first stage of the Industrial Revolution reached Sweden. This first take-off was founded on rural forges, textile proto-industries and sawmills.

The popularity of Charles XIV decreased for a time in the 1830s, culminating in the Rabulist riots in 1838 after the Lèse-majesté conviction of the journalist Magnus Jacob Crusenstolpe, and some calls for his abdication.

The 19th century was marked by the emergence of a liberal opposition press, the abolition of guild monopolies in trade and manufacturing in favor of free enterprise, the introduction of taxation and voting reforms, the installation of a national military service, and the rise in the electorate of three major party groups: the Social Democratic Party, the Liberal Party, and the Conservative Party.

=== Modernisation of Sweden: 1860–1910 ===
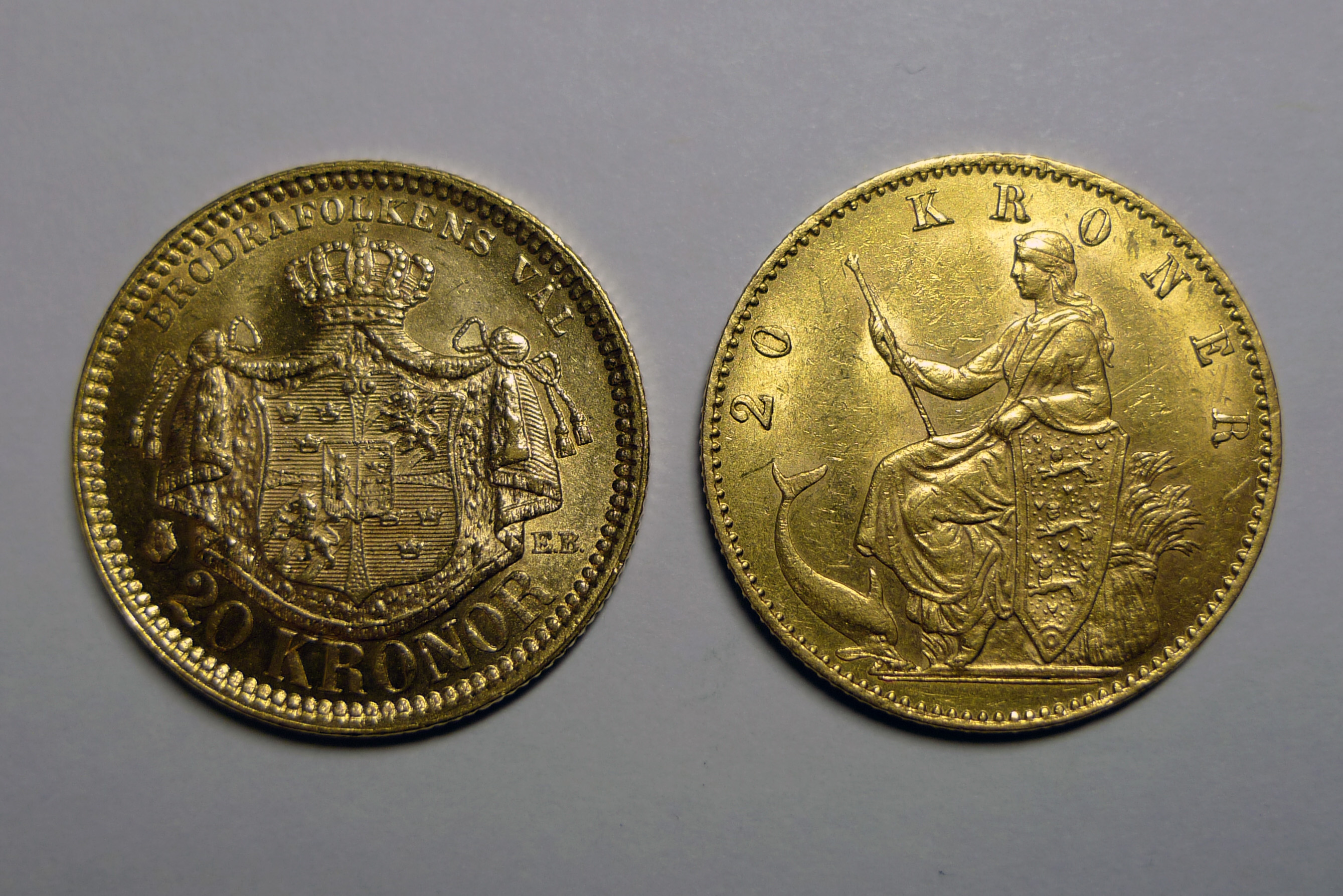
Two golden 20 kr coins from the Scandinavian Monetary Union, which was based on a gold standard. The coin to the left is Swedish and the right one is Danish.

Sweden, much like Japan at the same time, transformed from a stagnant rural society to a vibrant industrial society between the 1860s and 1910. The agricultural economy shifted gradually from a communal village to a more efficient private farm-based agriculture. There was less need for manual labor on the farm so many went to the cities and a million Swedes emigrated to the United States between 1850 and 1890. Many returned and brought word of the higher productivity of American industry, this stimulating faster modernisation.

In 1873, Sweden and Denmark formed the Scandinavian Monetary Union.

The late 19th century saw the emergence of an opposition press, the abolition of guild monopolies on craftsmen and the reform of taxation. Two years of military service was made compulsory for young men although there was no warfare.

== 20th century ==
With a broader voting franchise, the nation saw the emergence of three major party groups – Social Democrat, Liberal, and Conservative. The parties debated further expansion of the voting franchise. The Liberal Party, based on the middle class, put forth in 1907 a program for local voting rights later accepted in the Riksdag. The majority of Liberals wanted to require some property ownership before a man could vote, while the Social Democrats called for total male suffrage without property limitations. The strong farmer representation in the Second Chamber of the Riksdag maintained a conservative view, but their decline after 1900 gradually ended opposition to full suffrage.

Religion maintained a major role but public school religious education changed from the drill in the Lutheran catechism to biblical-ethical studies.

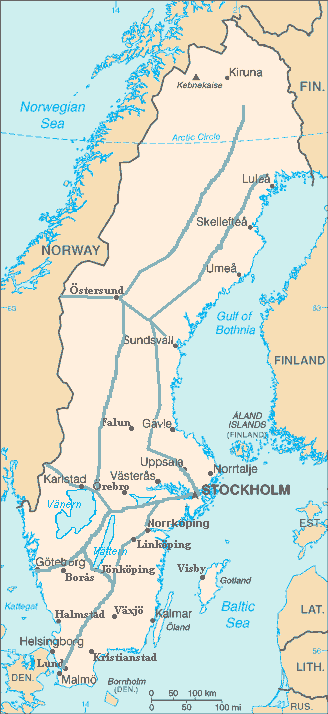
Main line railways built 1860–1930

=== Sweden in World War I ===
Sweden was neutral in World War I, although the Swedish government was sympathetic to both sides at different times during the conflict, even briefly occupying the Åland islands jointly with the Germans. At first, the Swedish government flirted with the possibility of changing their neutral stance to side with the Central Powers, and made concessions to them including mining the Öresund straits to close them to Allied warships wishing to enter the Baltic. Later the Swedish signed agreements allowing trade with the Allied powers and limiting trade with Central Powers, though this brought about the fall of the government of Hjalmar Hammarskjöld.

=== Industrialisation: 1910–1939 ===
During the First World War and the 1920s, its industries expanded to meet the European demand for Swedish steel, ball bearings, wood pulp, and matches. Post-war prosperity provided the foundations for the social welfare policies characteristic of modern Sweden.

=== Welfare state ===
Sweden created a successful model of social democracy because of the unique way in which Sweden's labour leaders, politicians, and classes cooperated during the early development of Swedish democracy. Sweden's socialist leaders chose a moderate, reformist political course with broad-based public support. This helped Sweden avoid the severe extremist challenges and political and class divisions that plagued many European countries that attempted to develop social democratic systems after 1911. By dealing early, cooperatively, and effectively with the challenges of industrialisation and its impact on Swedish social, political, and economic structures, Swedish social democrats were able to create one of the most successful social democratic systems in the world, including both a welfare state and extensive protections of civil liberties.

When the Social Democratic Party came into power in 1932, its leaders introduced a new political decision-making process, which later became known as "the Swedish model" or the Folkhemmet (The People's Home). The party took a central role, but tried as far as possible to base its policy on mutual understanding and compromise. Different interest groups were always involved in official committees that preceded government decisions.

=== Foreign policy 1920–1939 ===
Foreign policy concerns in the 1930s centered on Soviet and German expansionism, which pursuing abortive efforts at Nordic defense co-operation.

=== Sweden during World War II ===
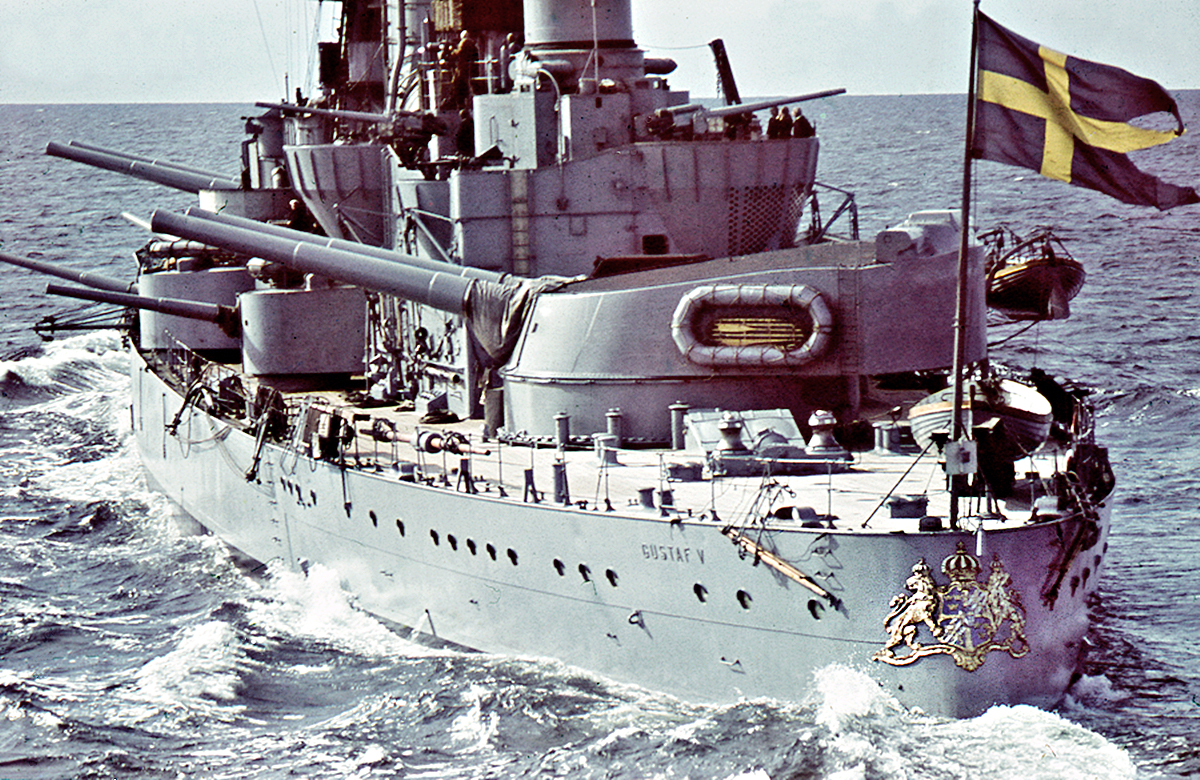
Coastal defence ship of the Swedish Navy HM Pansarskepp Gustaf V (Agfacolor photo until 1957)

Sweden declared itself neutral during World War II, with the exception of the Winter War between Finland the Soviet Union, in which Sweden declared itself a non-belligerent on Finland's side. During the German occupation of Norway, Sweden did permit German troops to pass through its territory, and supplied the Nazi regime with steel and ball-bearings.

The dominant historiography for decades after the war ignored the Holocaust and used what it called the "small state realist" argument. It held that that neutrality and co-operation with Germany were necessary for survival since Germany was vastly more powerful, concessions were limited and were only made when the threat was too great. Neutrality was bent but not broken; national unity was paramount; and in any case, Sweden had the neutral right to trade with Germany. Germany needed Swedish iron, and Sweden had nothing to gain and much to lose from an invasion. The nation was run by a national unity government, which included all major parties in the Riksdag except the communist party. Its key leaders included Prime Minister Per Albin Hansson, King Gustav V, and Foreign Minister Christian Günther.

Humanitarian aid to Jews facing the Holocaust was the mission of Swedish diplomat Raoul Wallenberg. As the secretary of the 1944 Swedish delegation to Hungary, to co-ordinate humanitarian relief for the Jews of Europe during the Jewish Holocaust. He helped to rescue tens of thousands of Jews in Nazi-occupied Hungary in late 1944. He disappeared in January 1945, and probably died in a Soviet prison in 1947.

=== Post-war Sweden ===
Sweden was one of the first non-participants of World War II to join the United Nations (in 1946). Apart from this, the country's leaders tried to stay out of alliances and remained officially neutral during the entire Cold War, not joining NATO until 2024.

The social democratic party held government for 44 years (1932–1976). They spent much of the 1950s and 1960s building Folkhemmet (The People's Home), the Swedish welfare state. Sweden's industry had not been damaged by the war and it was in a position to help re-build Northern Europe in the decades following 1945. This led to an economic upswing in the post-war era that made the welfare system feasible. However, by the 1970s, the economies of the rest of Western Europe were prosperous and growing rapidly, while the Swedish economy stagnated. Many economists blamed its large tax funded public sector.

In 1976, the social democrats lost their majority. The 1976 parliamentary elections brought a liberal/right-wing coalition to power. Over the next six years, four governments ruled and fell, composed by all or some of the parties that had won in 1976. The fourth liberal government in these years came under fire by Social Democrats and trade unions and the Moderate Party, culminating in the Social Democrats regaining power in 1982.

During the Cold War Sweden maintained a dual approach; publicly the strict neutrality policy was forcefully maintained, but unofficially strong ties were kept with the U.S., Norway, Denmark, West Germany, and other NATO countries. Swedes hoped that the U.S. would use conventional and nuclear weapons in case of a Soviet attack on Sweden. A strong ability to defend against an amphibious invasion was maintained, complete with Swedish-built warplanes, but there was no long-range bombing capability.

In the early 1960s, U.S. nuclear submarines armed with mid-range Polaris A-1 nuclear missiles were deployed not far from the Swedish west coast. Range and safety considerations made this a good area from which to launch a retaliatory nuclear strike on Moscow. The U.S. secretly provided Sweden with a military security guarantee, promising to provide military force in aid of Sweden in case of Soviet aggression. As part of the military cooperation, the U.S. provided much help in the development of the Saab 37 Viggen, as a strong Swedish air force was seen as necessary to keep Soviet anti-submarine aircraft from operating in the missile launch area. In return, Swedish scientists at the Royal Institute of Technology made considerable contributions to enhancing the targeting performance of the Polaris missiles.

On 28 February 1986, the Social Democratic leader Prime Minister Olof Palme was assassinated. The murderer was never found. Shocked Swedes worried whether the nation had lost its innocence.

On 28 September 1994, the MS Estonia sank as the ship was crossing the Baltic Sea, en route from Tallinn, Estonia, to Stockholm, Sweden. The disaster claimed the lives of 852 people (501 of them were Swedes), being one of the worst maritime disasters of the 20th century.

In 1995, a few years after the end of the Cold War, Sweden became a member of the European Union and the old term "policy of neutrality" fell out of use. In a referendum held in 2003, the majority voted not to adopt the Euro as the country's official currency. Foreign Minister Anna Lindh was murdered just before the referendum.

During the 1980s, Sweden attempted to preserve its model of capitalism plus a generous welfare state through what it called a "bridging policy." Unintended consequences became apparent in the 1990s. There was an economic crisis with high unemployment and several banks and companies going bankrupt. There was high inflation as well as overheated real estate and financial markets and a negative real rate of interest. After 1991, these factors caused a recession with high unemployment. There were political reverberations and businesses called for neoliberal government policies. By 2000, however, the positive trends dominated. Compared to the rest of Europe, unemployment in Sweden was low, while economic growth has been high, inflation low, the budget in balance, and the balance of payments positive.

The post-war years also saw a steady growth in the percentage of households owning various consumer goods. In 1977, for example, 74.7% of households had a car, 73% a toaster, 83% a washing machine, 96% a vacuum cleaner, 70% a food processor, 93% a television, 66% a cassette recorder, 98% a transistor radio, and 78% a still camera, while in 1976 26% of households had a radio recorder, 67% a tape recorder, and 69% a record player.

== Foreign policy ==
The foreign policy of Sweden encompasses a range of themes over the centuries. Some of the main issues include:

- Sweden has historically pursued a policy of neutrality, aiming to avoid involvement in conflicts between major powers. This neutrality allowed Sweden to navigate the tumultuous European political landscape and maintain its sovereignty. It dropped the neutrality policy in response to the 2022 Russian invasion of Ukraine, and joined NATO in 2024. On 7 March 2024, Sweden became NATO's 32nd member country.
- Sweden has sought to maintain a balance of power in Northern Europe, acting as a counterweight to dominant regional powers. This approach aimed to prevent any single power from gaining excessive influence and threatening Swedish interests.
- Sweden's historical dominance in the Baltic Sea region played a crucial role in shaping its diplomatic history. Through territorial expansion, Sweden established control over strategic territories, such as present-day Finland, Estonia, Latvia, and parts of Russia, impacting its relations with neighboring states.
- During the 17th and 18th centuries, Sweden emerged as a major European power, participating in conflicts such as the Thirty Years' War and the Great Northern War. Its diplomatic efforts were often influenced by power struggles with other European great powers, such as Russia and Poland.
- Sweden has actively engaged in peace mediation efforts, seeking to resolve conflicts and broker peace agreements. Notable examples include the Treaty of Westphalia in 1648, which ended the Thirty Years' War, and various mediation efforts during the 20th century.
- Sweden has a longstanding tradition of promoting international cooperation, human rights, and humanitarian initiatives. It has been involved in the establishment of international organisations such as the League of Nations and the United Nations, and has championed causes such as humanitarian aid and disarmament.
- Sweden has pursued close ties and cooperation with its neighboring Nordic countries, particularly Denmark, Finland, Iceland, and Norway. This commitment to Scandinavian unity has been reflected in diplomatic initiatives, trade agreements, and cultural exchanges.
- Sweden's relationship with the European Union (EU) has been a significant theme in its recent diplomatic history. While Sweden joined the EU in 1995, it has maintained a somewhat reserved approach, often balancing its national interests with EU membership.
- Sweden has been an advocate for global development and has provided substantial aid to developing countries. It has sought to address global inequalities and promote sustainable development through its aid programs, often challenging neocolonial practices.
- In the 21st century, Sweden has gained attention for its feminist foreign policy approach, which aims to integrate gender equality into its diplomatic efforts. Sweden has been a leading advocate for women's rights globally, emphasizing the inclusion and empowerment of women in peacebuilding, conflict resolution, and development processes.

== Historiography ==
According to Lönnroth (1998) in the 19th century and early 20th century, Swedish historians saw their writing in terms of literature and storytelling, rather than analysis and interpretation. Harald Hjärne (1848–1922) pioneered modern historical scholarship. In 1876, he attacked the traditional myths of the social and legal conditions of ancient Greece and Rome inherited from the classical authors. He was inspired by German scholar Barthold Georg Niebuhr (1776–1831), a founder of modern German historiography. As a professor of history at Uppsala University, Hjärne became a spokesman for the Conservative Party and the Swedish monarchy by 1900. Hjärne had an enormous influence on his students and, indeed, on an entire generation of historians, who mostly became political conservatives and nationalists. Another movement emerged at Lund University around 1910, where critical scholars began using the source critics' methods to the early history of Scandinavia. The brothers Lauritz Weibull and Curt Weibull were the leaders, and they had followers at Lund and Göteborg universities. The result was a half-century of often embittered controversy between traditionalists and revisionists that lasted until 1960. There was a blurring of the ideological fronts resulting from experiences during and after World War II. In the meantime, in the general expansion of university education in the postwar period, history was generally neglected. Only through the activities of the National Research Council of the Humanities and the dedicated efforts of certain ambitious university professors created some expansion of historical scholarship. After 1990, there were signs of revival in historiography, with a strong new emphasis on 20th-century topics, as well as the application of social history and computerised statistical techniques to the demographic history of ordinary villagers before 1900.

According to Lars Magnusson, social history is a specialty inside economic history. Three major themes are the standard of living by strata during industrialisation; the history of work; and social issues in preindustrial society and the transition to industrialism.

== See also ==
- Flag of Sweden
- Swedish intervention in Persia
- Foreign relations of Sweden#History
- History of Scandinavia
- History of Sweden (1772–1809)
- History of the European Union
- List of prime ministers of Sweden
- List of Swedish monarchs
- List of Swedish people
- Military history of Sweden
- Political unions involving Sweden
  - Kalmar Union
  - Union between Sweden and Norway
- Politics of Sweden
- Privy Council of Sweden
- Riksdag of the Estates
- Sami history

== Bibliography ==
=== Surveys ===
- Andersson, Ingvar. A History of Sweden (1956) online edition.
- Derry, Thomas Kingston. A History of Scandinavia: Norway, Sweden, Denmark, Finland and Iceland. (1979). 447 pp.
- Grimberg, Carl. A History of Sweden (1935) online.
- Heckscher, Eli F. An economic history of Sweden (1963) online
- Kent, Neil. A Concise History of Sweden (2008), 314 pp. excerpt and text search.
- Lagerqvist, Christopher, Reformer och Revolutioner. En kort introduktion till Sveriges ekonomiska historia, 1750–2010 (Lund 2013).
- Magnusson, Lars. An Economic History of Sweden (2000) online edition.
- Moberg, Vilhelm, and Paul Britten Austin. A History of the Swedish People: Volume 1: From Prehistory to the Renaissance, (2005); A History of the Swedish People: Volume II: From Renaissance to Revolution (2005).
- Nordstrom, Byron J. The History of Sweden (2002) excerpt and text search; also full text online
- Scott, Franklin D. Sweden: The Nation's History (1988), survey by leading scholar; excerpt and text search.
- Sprague, Martina. Sweden: An Illustrated History (2005) excerpt and text search.
- Warme, Lars G., ed. A History of Swedish Literature. (1996). 585 pp.

=== Pre-1700 ===
- Forte, Angelo. Oram, Richard. Pedersen, Frederik. Viking Empires (2005).
- Hudson, Benjamin. Viking Pirates and Christian Princes: Dynasty, Religion, and Empire in North America (2005).
- Moberg, Vilhelm, and Paul Britten Austin. A History of the Swedish People: Volume 1: From Prehistory to the Renaissance (2005) online
- Österberg, Eva. Mentalities and Other Realities: Essays in Medieval and Early Modern Scandinavian History. Lund U. Press, 1991. 207 pp.
- Österberg, Eva and Lindström, Dag. Crime and Social Control in Medieval and Early Modern Swedish Towns. (1988). 169 pp.
- Porshnev, B. F. and Paul Dukes, eds. Muscovy and Sweden in the Thirty Years' War, 1630–1635. (1996). 256 pp.
- Roberts, Michael. The Early Vasas: A History of Sweden 1523–1611 (1968).
- Roberts, Michael. From Oxenstierna to Charles XII. Four Studies. (1991). 203 pp.
- Roberts, Michael. The Swedish Imperial Experience, 1560–1718. (1979). 156 pp.
- Thunberg, Carl L. Särkland och dess källmaterial (2011).

=== Since 1700 ===
- Barton, H. Arnold. Scandinavia in the Revolutionary Era, 1760–1815 (1986).
- Barton, Sunbar P. Bernadotte: Prince and King, 1810–1844 (1925), standard scholarly history.
- Chatterton, Mark. Saab: The Innovator. (1980). 160 pp.
- Cronholm, Neander N. (1902). A History of Sweden from the Earliest Times to the Present Day.
- Frängsmyr, Tore, ed. Science in Sweden: The Royal Swedish Academy of Sciences, 1739–1989. (1989). 291 pp.
- Fry, John A., ed. Limits of the Welfare State: Critical Views on Post-War Sweden. (1979). 234 pp.
- Gustavson, Carl G. The Small Giant: Sweden Enters the Industrial Era. (1986). 364 pp.
- Hodgson, Antony. Scandinavian Music: Finland and Sweden. (1985). 224 pp.
- Hoppe, Göran and Langton, John. Peasantry to Capitalism: Western Östergötland in the Nineteenth Century. (1995). 457 pp.
- Janson, Florence Edith. The background of Swedish immigration, 1840–1930 (1931; reprinted 1970), Push factors in Sweden causing migration to USA online.
- Jonas, Frank. Scandinavia and the Great Powers in the First World War (2019) online review.
- Lagerqvist, Christopher, Reformer och Revolutioner. En kort introduktion until Sveriges ekonomiska historia, 1750–2010 (Lund 2013).
- Lewin, Leif. Ideology and Strategy: A Century of Swedish Politics. (1988). 344 pp.
- Metcalf, Michael F., ed. The Riksdag: A History of the Swedish Parliament. (1987). 347 pp.
- Misgeld, Klaus; Molin, Karl; and Amark, Klas. Creating Social Democracy: A Century of the Social Democratic Labor Party in Sweden. (1993). 500 pp.
- Moberg, Vilhelm, and Paul Britten Austin. A History of the Swedish People: Volume II: From Renaissance to Revolution (2005).
- Norberg, Johan (23 October 2013). How Laissez-Faire Made Sweden Rich. Cato Institute.
- Olsen, Gregg M. (1999). "Half Empty or Half Full? the Swedish Welfare State in Transition". Canadian Review of Sociology and Anthropology. 16 (2): 241+ – via Questia.
- Olson, Kenneth E. The history makers: The press of Europe from its beginnings through 1965 (LSU Press, 1966) pp. 33–49.
- Palmer, Alan. Bernadotte: Napoleon's Marshal, Sweden's King. (1991). 285 pp.
- Pred, Allan. Lost Words and Lost Worlds: Modernity and the Language of Everyday Life in Late Nineteenth-Century Stockholm. (1990). 298 pp.
- Pred, Allan Richard. Place, Practice and Structure: Social and Spatial Transformation in Southern Sweden, 1750–1850. (1986). 268 pp.
- Roberts, Michael. The Age of Liberty: Sweden, 1719–1772. (1986). 233 pp. online.
- Salmon, Patrick. Scandinavia and the great powers 1890-1940 Cambridge University Press, 2002) online.
- Sejersted, Francis. The Age of Social Democracy: Norway and Sweden in the Twentieth Century (Princeton University Press; 2011); 543 pp; Traces the history of the Scandinavian social model as it developed after the separation of Norway and Sweden in 1905.
- Söderberg, Johan et al. A Stagnating Metropolis: The Economy and Demography of Stockholm, 1750–1850. (1991). 234 pp.
- Waldenström, Daniel. "The national wealth of Sweden, 1810–2014" Scandinavian Economic History Review 64#1 (2016) pp. 36–54. doi:10.1080/03585522.2015.1132759.

=== Historiography and memory ===
- Hatton, Ragnhild. "Some notes on Swedish historiography." History 37.130 (1952): 97–113. online
- Metcalf, Michael F. "The first 'modern' party system?: Political parties, Sweden's Age of liberty and the historians." Scandinavian Journal of History 2.1–4 (1977): 265–287.
- Olsson, Ulf. "Fluctuat nec mergitur: Economic history in Sweden at the turn of the century 2000." Scandinavian Economic History Review 50.3 (2002): 68–82.
- Söderberg, Johan. "Economic History in Sweden: Some Recent Research Trends", NEHA Bulletin 9.1 (1995): 21–23.
- Thomson, Erik. "Beyond the Military State: Sweden’s Great Power Period in Recent Historiography." History Compass 9.4 (2011): 269–283. online.
