= Deaths in August 2022 =

The following is a list of notable deaths in August 2022.

Entries for each day are listed alphabetically by surname. A typical entry lists information in the following sequence:

- Name, age, country of citizenship at birth, subsequent country of citizenship (if applicable), reason for notability, cause of death (if known), and reference.

== August 2022 ==
=== 1 ===
- Sarfraz Ali, 53, Pakistani general, helicopter crash.
- Lennart Back, 89, Swedish Olympic race walker (1960).
- Trevor Baines, 82, British businessman and convicted fraudster.
- Carlos Blixen, 85, Uruguayan basketball player, Olympic bronze medallist (1956).
- Jack Bowman, 90, American politician, member of the Tennessee House of Representatives (1967–1976).
- Rosa de Castilla, 90, Mexican singer and actress (The Unknown Mariachi, Yo... el aventurero, Héroe a la fuerza).
- Tom Cornell, 88, American peace activist and newspaper editor (Catholic Worker).
- Doc Dockery, 89, American businessman and author.
- Milan Đuričić, 60, Serbian football manager (Vojvodina, Inđija, Radnički Niš).
- Paul Eenhoorn, 73, Australian-born American actor (This Is Martin Bonner, Land Ho!, Viper Club), heart attack.
- Teresa Ferenc, 88, Polish poet.
- Hugo Fernández, 77, Uruguayan football player (Nacional, Puebla) and manager (Consadole Sapporo).
- John Fielding, 82, English footballer (Brentford, Southport, Grimsby Town).
- Mikhail Golovatov, 72, Russian intelligence officer (KGB).
- John Hughes, 79, Scottish football player (Celtic, national team) and manager (Stranraer).
- Anastasiya Kobzarenko, 88, Ukrainian director, librarian, and writer.
- Horst Melzig, 81, German Olympic fencer.
- Cont Mhlanga, 64, Zimbabwean playwright, actor, and theatre director.
- Ilinka Mitreva, 72, Macedonian politician, minister of foreign affairs (2001, 2002–2006).
- Joseph Mondello, 84, American politician and diplomat, ambassador to Trinidad and Tobago (2018–2021).
- Hiroshi Ōtake, 90, Japanese voice actor (Perman, The Kabocha Wine, Akira), heart failure.
- Sir Michael Pike, 90, British diplomat, ambassador to Vietnam (1982–1985).
- David Thomas Pugh, 79, British marine scientist.
- Philip Purser, 96, British television critic and novelist.
- Andrejs Rubins, 43, Latvian footballer (Skonto, Crystal Palace, national team).
- Sarathi, 80, Indian actor (Velugu Needalu, Gandikota Rahasyam, Chanakya Chandragupta) and comedian, kidney disease.
- Gary Schroen, 80, American intelligence officer (CIA).
- Elaine Schuster, 90, American philanthropist and diplomat, complications from pneumonia.
- Pantur Silaban, 84, Indonesian physicist.
- Robert E. Simanek, 92, American marine, Medal of Honor recipient (1953).
- Lars Tate, 56, American football player (Georgia Bulldogs, Tampa Bay Buccaneers, Chicago Bears), throat cancer.
- Hans Weilbächer, 88, German footballer (Eintracht Frankfurt, West Germany national team).
- Eugene Wen-chin Wu, 100, Chinese-born American scholar.
- Prince Yawson, 52, Ghanaian actor (Obra, Diabolo), stroke.

=== 2 ===
- Juan Antonio Arévalo, 87, Spanish politician, senator (1979–2000).
- Buddy Arrington, 84, American racing driver (NASCAR).
- Melissa Bank, 61, American writer (The Girls' Guide to Hunting and Fishing), lung cancer.
- David Bawden, 62, American conclavist, claimant to the papacy (since 1990).
- Jan Budkiewicz, 88, Polish publicist, screenwriter, and politician, MP (1993–1997).
- Jimmy Burson, 81, American football player (St. Louis Cardinals, Atlanta Falcons).
- Luis Augusto Castro Quiroga, 80, Colombian Roman Catholic prelate, apostolic vicar of San Vicente (1986–1998), archbishop of Tunja (1998–2020) and twice president of the CEC, COVID-19.
- Cliodhna Cussen, 89, Irish sculptor.
- Jack Deloplaine, 68, American football player (Pittsburgh Steelers, Washington Redskins, Chicago Bears).
- Stan Dragland, 79, Canadian writer and editor.
- Brenda Fisher, 95, English long-distance swimmer, complications of a stroke.
- Julio César Gómez, 81, Uruguayan Olympic basketball player.
- Friedrich-Wilhelm von Herrmann, 87, German philosopher, Heidegger scholar.
- Jerry Holbert, 63, American political cartoonist (Boston Herald).
- Joo Don-sik, 85, South Korean politician, minister of culture and sports (1994–1995).
- Lucien Kroll, 95, Belgian architect.
- Velichko Minekov, 93, Bulgarian sculptor.
- Adolfo Navajas Artaza, 97, Argentine businessman and politician, minister of social action (1982–1983) and governor of Corrientes (1969–1973).
- Susan Neher, 63, American actress (To Rome with Love, Getting Together).
- Jack Netzler, 82, Samoan politician, deputy (1981–2001).
- Zbyszko Piwoński, 93, Polish politician, voivode of Zielona Góra (1984–1990) and senator (1993–2005).
- Stavros Psycharis, 77, Greek publisher and politician, civil administrator of Mount Athos (1996–2001).
- Clayton Ruby, 80, Canadian civil rights lawyer and activist.
- Vin Scully, 94, American Hall of Fame sportscaster (Brooklyn/Los Angeles Dodgers).
- Mincho Todorov, 90, Bulgarian Olympic gymnast.
- Nikolay Yefimov, 89, Russian journalist.

=== 3 ===
- Yvonne Baby, 90, French journalist and novelist.
- Shirley Barrett, 61, Australian film director and screenwriter (Love Serenade), cancer.
- Nerijus Bilevicius, 42, Lithuanian convicted murderer (Lisa Holm), stabbed.
- Stuart Briscoe, 91, English-born American evangelical author.
- Terry Caffery, 73, Canadian ice hockey player (Chicago Blackhawks, Minnesota North Stars).
- Mithilesh Chaturvedi, 67, Indian actor (Koi... Mil Gaya, Gadar: Ek Prem Katha, Mohalla Assi), heart attack.
- Raymond Damadian, 86, American physician, inventor of magnetic resonance imaging.
- Ton Frinking, 91, Dutch politician, MP (1977–1993), state secretary for defence (1993–1994).
- Bruce Grant, 97, Australian writer and journalist.
- Roy Hackett, 93, Jamaican-British civil rights activist.
- Imdaad Hamid, 78, Indonesian politician, mayor of Balikpapan (2001–2011).
- Evan Jones, 90, Australian poet.
- Olga Kachura, 52, Russian officer, missile strike.
- Petro Kravchuk, 60, Ukrainian politician, MP (2006–2008).
- Lee Gi-ho, 76, South Korean politician, minister of labor (1997–1999).
- Alastair Little, 72, British chef, cookbook author and restaurateur.
- Jan Longone, 89, American food historian and writer.
- Franz Marijnen, 79, Belgian theatre director.
- Ann McGuiness, 65, American reproductive rights advocate, leiomyosarcoma.
- Nicky Moore, 75, English singer (Samson), complications from Parkinson's disease.
- Ng Boon Bee, 84, Malaysian badminton player, Olympic silver medallist (1972).
- Paul X. Rinn, 75, American naval captain.
- Abu Saleh, 82, Bangladeshi politician, MP (1971–1973).
- Ilya Tsipursky, 87, Russian sambist and judoka.
- Villiam Vecchi, 73, Italian footballer (Milan, Como, SPAL).
- Jackie Walorski, 58, American politician, member of the U.S. House of Representatives (since 2013) and Indiana House of Representatives (2005–2010), traffic collision.

=== 4 ===
- Agustín Drake Aldama, 87, Cuban sculptor.
- Thorleif Andresen, 77, Norwegian Olympic cyclist (1968, 1972, 1976).
- Auh June-sun, 85, South Korean politician, MP (1996–2000).
- Tafa Balogun, 74, Nigerian police officer, inspector general of police (2002–2005).
- Hilda Binns, 76, Canadian Paralympic athlete.
- Neil Castles, 87, American racing driver (NASCAR).
- Joanna Clark, 44, English environmental scientist.
- Sandy Dillon, 62, American singer-songwriter.
- Rodger Doner, 84, Canadian Olympic wrestler (1964).
- Johnny Famechon, 77, French-born Australian boxer, WBC featherweight champion (1969–1970).
- Daren Gilbert, 58, American football player (New Orleans Saints).
- Sam Gooden, 87, American Hall of Fame soul singer (The Impressions).
- Santiago Grisolía, 1st Marquess of Grisolía, 99, Spanish biochemist.
- Carl Kabat, 88, American Roman Catholic priest and anti-nuclear weapons activist.
- Akin Mabogunje, 90, Nigerian geographer, president of the International Geographical Union (1980–1984).
- Margaret Maruani, 68, Tunisian-born French sociologist.
- Abdelkader Moukhtatif, 88, Moroccan Olympic footballer (1964).
- Edir Oliveira, 72, Brazilian politician, mayor of Gravataí (1993–1997).
- Atakhan Pashayev, 84, Azerbaijani civil servant, chairman of the National Archive Department (since 2002).
- J. A. O. Preus III, 69, American academic administrator (Concordia University Irvine).
- Adriana Roel, 88, Mexican actress (Viva Maria!, Autumn Days, Chucho el Roto).
- Ebbe Schön, 92, Swedish folklorist.
- Sir Robert Walmsley, 81, British Royal Navy vice admiral, controller of the Navy (1994–1996).
- Albert Woodfox, 75, American prisoner (Angola Three), complications from COVID-19.

=== 5 ===
- Tom Alberg, 82, American lawyer and businessman, director of Amazon.com (1996–2019).
- Ana Luísa Amaral, 66, Portuguese poet.
- Al Barry, 91, American football player (Green Bay Packers, New York Giants, Los Angeles Chargers).
- Diego Bertie, 54, Peruvian singer and actor (Ultra Warrior, Report on Death, Crossing a Shadow), fall.
- Robert Brockman, 81, American software executive, CEO of Reynolds and Reynolds.
- Dean Carlson, 72, American football player (Kansas City Chiefs, Green Bay Packers).
- Jean-Jacques Cassiman, 79, Belgian geneticist.
- Reginald Cawcutt, 83, South African Roman Catholic prelate, auxiliary bishop of Cape Town (1992–2002).
- John Chandler, 98, American educator, president of Hamilton College (1968–1973) and Williams College (1973–1985).
- Judith Durham, 79, Australian singer (The Seekers), lung disease.
- Kostja Gatnik, 76, Slovenian children's book illustrator.
- Debi Ghosal, 87, Indian politician, MP (1984–1989).
- Cherie Gil, 59, Filipino actress (Manila By Night, Oro, Plata, Mata, Bituing Walang Ningning), cancer.
- Roberto Gil, 84, Spanish football player (Valencia) and coach.
- Clu Gulager, 93, American actor (The Return of the Living Dead, The Tall Man, The Last Picture Show).
- Ali Haydar, 90, Syrian military officer.
- Tayseer al-Jabari, 50, Palestinian Islamic militant, military leader of the Palestinian Islamic Jihad (since 2019), airstrike.
- Joseph P. Johnson, 90, American politician, member of the Virginia House of Delegates (1966–1970, 1990–2014).
- Rudolf Knez, 77, Slovenian Olympic ice hockey player (1968, 1972).
- Felix Kolmer, 100, Czech physicist.
- Michael Lang, 80, American pianist and composer.
- Bob Lay, 78, Australian Olympic sprinter (1964).
- Luciano Macías, 87, Ecuadorian footballer (Barcelona, Miami Toros, national team).
- Issey Miyake, 84, Japanese fashion designer (L'eau d'Issey), liver cancer.
- Pat Norman, 82, American activist.
- Aled Owen, 88, Welsh footballer (Tottenham Hotspur, Ipswich Town, Wrexham).
- Mark Paterson, 74, New Zealand Olympic sailor (1976).
- Caroline Pauwels, 58, Belgian academic administrator, rector of the Vrije Universiteit Brussel (2016–2022), esophageal cancer.
- Dillon Quirke, 24, Irish hurler (Tipperary).
- Richard Roat, 89, American actor (Days of Our Lives, Generations, The Doctors), heart attack.
- Peter Schowtka, 77, German politician, member of the Landtag of Saxony (1991–2014) and mayor of Wittichenau (1990–1994).
- Abdul Rahim Shapiee, 45, Singaporean drug smuggler, execution by hanging.
- Jô Soares, 84, Brazilian comedian and talk show host (Programa do Jô).
- Torgny Söderberg, 77, Swedish songwriter ("100%", "Diggi-Loo Diggi-Ley").
- Michael Howard, 21st Earl of Suffolk, 87, British hereditary peer, member of the House of Lords (1957–1999).
- Narender Thapa, 58, Indian footballer (Bengal, national team), cardiac arrest.
- John Tingle, 90, Australian broadcaster and politician, New South Wales MLC (1995–2006).
- Susan Whelchel, 77, American politician, mayor of Boca Raton, Florida (2008–2014).

=== 6 ===
- Shinmon Aoki, 85, Japanese writer, lung cancer.
- Archie Battersbee, 12, British child, removal of life support.
- Carlo Bonomi, 85, Italian voice actor (Pingu, La Linea) and clown.
- Yvon Buissereth, 60, Haitian politician, senator, shot.
- Steve Courtin, 79, American basketball player (Saint Joseph's Hawks, Philadelphia 76ers).
- Doug Curtin, 74, Welsh footballer (Cardiff City, Mansfield Town), heart attack.
- Casper Fischer, 93, American politician.
- Hussein Abdo Hamza, 72, Egyptian jurist, president of the State Lawsuits Authority (2017–2019).
- Clyde Hendrick, 86, American psychologist.
- Buddy Leach, 88, American politician, member of the U.S. House of Representatives (1979–1981) and Louisiana House of Representatives (1968–1979, 1984–1988).
- Raymond Lebreton, 80, French racing cyclist.
- Daniel Lévi, 60, French singer-songwriter ("L'envie d'aimer"), colon cancer.
- Marilyn Loden, 76, American writer, coined the phrase "glass ceiling", small-cell carcinoma.
- John Mulhall, 83, British Olympic gymnast (1960, 1964).
- David Muse, 73, American singer, songwriter and composer (Firefall, The Marshall Tucker Band), cancer.
- Thomas G. Phillips, 85, British-born American physicist.
- Samu, 81, Korean-Canadian Buddhist monk, Parkinson's disease.
- Erich Schönbächler, 86, Swiss Olympic biathlete (1964).
- Bob Skelly, 79, Canadian politician, MP (1988–1993).
- Wayne Slawson, 89, American composer.
- Boudjemaa Talai, 70, Algerian politician, MP (2017–2019) and transport minister (2015–2017).
- James E. Turner, 82, American scholar.
- Joaquim Jesus Vieira, 76, Portuguese Olympic wrestler.
- Gene Visscher, 81, American college basketball coach (Weber State, Northern Arizona).
- Butch Wilkins, 75, American politician, member of the Arkansas House of Representatives (2009–2015), surgical complications.
- John Yanta, 90, American Roman Catholic prelate, bishop of Amarillo (1997–2008).

=== 7 ===
- Ezekiel Alebua, 75, Solomon Islands politician, prime minister (1986–1989) and MP (1980–1987).
- Biyi Bandele, 54, Nigerian novelist, playwright and film director (Elesin Oba, The King's Horseman, Half of a Yellow Sun).
- Ernesto Cavour, 82, Bolivian singer (Los Jairas).
- Noel Clarke, 91, Australian footballer (Melbourne).
- Carl Croneberg, 92, Swedish-American linguist.
- Elana Dykewomon, 72, American lesbian rights activist and author.
- Henryk Dziewior, 74, Polish entrepreneur and politician, mayor of Katowice (1994–1998).
- Bert Fields, 93, American lawyer (Michael Jackson, The Beatles, Warren Beatty) and author, complications from COVID-19.
- Anatoly Filipchenko, 94, Russian cosmonaut (Soyuz 7, Soyuz 16).
- Judy Gamin, 92, Australian politician, Queensland MLA (1988–1989, 1992–2001).
- Rita K. Gollin, 94, American scholar.
- Ned Goodman, 85, Canadian businessman (Dundee Corporation).
- Bill Graham, 83, Canadian politician, MP (1993–2007), minister of national defence (2004–2006) and foreign affairs (2002–2004).
- Ian Charleson Hedge, 93, Scottish botanist.
- Eike Christian Hirsch, 85, German journalist and writer.
- Gerd Kaminski, 79, Austrian legal scholar.
- Omar Khalid Khorasani, Pakistani Islamic militant, co-founder of the Pakistani Taliban and founder of Jamaat-ul-Ahrar, explosion.
- Leandro Lo, 33, Brazilian jiu-jitsu practitioner, shot.
- David McCullough, 89, American historian and author (Truman, John Adams), Pulitzer Prize winner (1993, 2002).
- Robert Mikhail Moskal, 84, American Ukrainian Greek Catholic hierarch, bishop of Saint Josaphat in Parma (1984–2009).
- Roger E. Mosley, 83, American actor (Magnum, P.I., Leadbelly, Terminal Island), injuries sustained in a traffic collision.
- Dionysis Simopoulos, 79, Greek astronomer, pancreatic cancer.
- Koru Tito, 61, Kiribati Roman Catholic prelate, bishop-elect of Tarawa and Nauru (since 2020).
- Alvin Trivelpiece, 91, American physicist.
- Yoshifumi Ushima, 55, Japanese singer and composer (Mobile Fighter G Gundam), complications from cirrhosis.
- Rostislav Václavíček, 75, Czech footballer (Zbrojovka Brno, K.S.C. Hasselt), Olympic champion (1980).
- Shea Zellweger, 96, American semiotician.
- Irik Zhdanov, 87, Russian boxing coach.

=== 8 ===
- Nathan Boya, 98, American daredevil and medical researcher, first African American to go over Niagara Falls.
- Stephen Castles, 77, Australian scholar.
- John M. Cooper, 82, American philosopher.
- Lamont Dozier, 81, American Hall of Fame songwriter ("You Can't Hurry Love", "Reach Out I'll Be There"), record producer (Holland–Dozier–Holland) and singer.
- Leo Giacometto, 60, American lieutenant colonel and politician, member of the Montana House of Representatives (1987–1990).
- Tom Hedderson, 68, Canadian politician, Newfoundland and Labrador MHA (1999–2015).
- Darryl Hunt, 72, English musician (The Pogues).
- Per Jansen, 80, Norwegian actor (Ballad of the Masterthief Ole Hoiland, A Commuter Kind of Love, Hud).
- Billy Legg, 74, English footballer (Huddersfield Town, Bradford Park Avenue).
- Jim Main, 79, Australian sports journalist.
- Mike Masters, 67, American professional wrestler (WWF), throat cancer.
- Dame Olivia Newton-John, 73, British-Australian singer ("I Honestly Love You", "Physical") and actress (Grease), Grammy winner (1974, 1975, 1982), breast cancer.
- Luis Enrique Oberto, 93, Venezuelan politician, member (1979–1999) and president (1990–1994) of the Chamber of Deputies, minister of finance (1972–1974).
- Bob Outterside, 90, Australian rugby union player.
- Benito Pastoriza Iyodo, 67, Puerto Rican author.
- Uma Pemmaraju, 64, Indian-American journalist and news anchor (Fox News).
- Zofia Posmysz, 98, Polish journalist and author (Passenger).
- Larry Rachleff, 66, American conductor, non-Hodgkin's lymphoma.
- Vasile Tărâțeanu, 76, Ukrainian writer.
- Jozef Tomko, 98, Slovak Roman Catholic cardinal, secretary general of the Synod of Bishops (1979–1985) and prefect for Evangelization of Peoples (1985–2001), complications from a fall.
- Ruby Williams, 94, American folk artist and produce vendor.

=== 9 ===
- John Abdo, 66, American health and fitness coach, businessman and nutritionist, cancer.
- Sir John Banham, 81, British businessman, director of the Confederation of British Industry (1987–1992).
- Heinz Behrens, 89, German actor (KLK Calling PTZ – The Red Orchestra, Bürgschaft für ein Jahr, Du bist nicht allein).
- Peter B. Bennett, 91, British medical researcher, founder of the Divers Alert Network.
- Ken Boles, 89, American politician, member of the Florida House of Representatives (1978–1982).
- Charlie Brandon, 78, American football player (Ottawa Rough Riders, Norfolk Neptunes, Winnipeg Blue Bombers).
- Raymond Briggs, 88, British children's writer and illustrator (Father Christmas, The Snowman, Fungus the Bogeyman), pneumonia.
- William I. Cowin, 84, American judge and politician.
- Bernie Crowe, 89, Australian footballer (Geelong).
- Dakolé Daïssala, 79, Cameroonian politician, MP (1997–2002, since 2013).
- Kieran Denvir, 90, Northern Irish Gaelic footballer (UCD GAA, Down GAA).
- Ingemar Erlandsson, 64, Swedish footballer (Malmö FF, national team).
- Nicholas Evans, 72, English writer (The Horse Whisperer), heart attack.
- Mario Fiorentini, 103, Italian partisan, spy and mathematician, kidney failure.
- Della Griffin, 100, American jazz vocalist and drummer.
- Jussi Hakulinen, 57, Finnish musician and singer-songwriter.
- Zoltán Halász, 62, Hungarian Olympic cyclist (1980).
- Mick Jones, 75, English football player (Notts County) and manager (Peterborough United, Plymouth Argyle).
- Rudi Koertzen, 73, South African cricket umpire, traffic collision.
- Marc Lapadula, 62, American playwright, screenwriter and lecturer (Yale University).
- Gene LeBell, 89, American grappling trainer (Ronda Rousey), promoter (NWA Hollywood Wrestling) and stuntman (The Green Hornet).
- Luigi Lucherini, 92, Italian politician, mayor of Arezzo (1999–2006).
- Donald Machholz, 69, American astronomer, co-inventor of the Messier marathon, COVID-19.
- Jane McAdam Freud, 64, British conceptual sculptor.
- Ian McCausland, 78, Australian artist.
- Alberto Orzan, 91, Italian footballer (Udinese, Fiorentina, national team).
- Pradeep Patwardhan, 64, Indian actor, heart attack.
- Mikalay Slyonkow, 93, Belarusian politician, first secretary of the Communist Party (1983–1987).
- Maya Thevar, 87, Indian politician, MP (1973–1984).
- Dimitris Tsironis, 62, Greek politician, MP (2007–2012).
- Sir Miles Warren, 93, New Zealand architect.

=== 10 ===
- João de Almeida Bruno, 87, Portuguese military judge.
- Peter Byrne, 86, Irish sportswriter (The Irish Times).
- Fernando Chalana, 63, Portuguese football player (Benfica, Bordeaux, national team) and manager.
- Lydia de Vega, 57, Filipino Olympic sprinter (1984, 1988), breast cancer.
- Kiril Dojčinovski, 78, Macedonian footballer (Vardar Skopje, Red Star Belgrade, Yugoslavia national team).
- Hushang Ebtehaj, 94, Iranian poet.
- Trinidad Falcés, Spanish transgender activist.
- Ben Farrell, 76, American concert promoter.
- Leslie Griffith, 66, American journalist (The Denver Post, San Francisco Chronicle) and news anchor (KTVU).
- Sir Ralph Halpern, 83, British fashion industry executive, founder of Topshop.
- Adel Heinrich, 96, American composer and organist.
- Andrew Hubner, 59, American author.
- Julian Klymkiw, 89, Canadian ice hockey player (New York Rangers).
- Dean S. Laird, 101, American World War II flying ace.
- Rosina Lajo, 90, Spanish teacher and politician, deputy (1977–1978).
- Pat Liney, 86, Scottish footballer (Dundee, St Mirren, Bradford City).
- Vesa-Matti Loiri, 77, Finnish actor (Uuno Turhapuro, The Boys, Sign of the Beast), musician and comedian, cancer.
- Eino Oksanen, 91, Finnish Olympic marathon runner (1956, 1960, 1964).
- Corky Palmer, 68, American college baseball coach (Southern Miss Golden Eagles).
- Helen Potrebenko, 82, Canadian author.
- Lawney Reyes, 91, American artist.
- Ostap Savka, 75, Ukrainian footballer (Naftovyk Drohobych, Shakhtar Donetsk, Karpaty Lviv).
- Jim Thomson, 89, New Zealand cricketer (Wellington).
- Robert Deam Tobin, 60, American academic, cancer.
- Yi-Fu Tuan, 91, Chinese-American geographer.
- Florentina Villalobos Chaparro, 91, Mexican journalist and politician, deputy (1964–1967, 1982–1985).
- Karina Vismara, 31, Argentine folk singer-songwriter, cancer and kidney failure.
- Kathryn Vonderau, 94, American baseball player (Fort Wayne Daisies, Peoria Redwings).
- Abdul Wadud, 75, American cellist.
- Margaret Way, 87, Australian author.

=== 11 ===
- Peter Aitchison, 90, English footballer (Colchester United).
- Michael Badnarik, 68, American software engineer, political activist, and radio talk show host, heart failure.
- Sir Simon Bland, 98, British soldier and courtier.
- Bill Blevin, 92, Australian physicist.
- Marco Brown, 94, Jamaican politician, MP (1980–1989), COVID-19.
- Darius Campbell Danesh, 41, Scottish singer-songwriter ("Colourblind", "Rushes", "Incredible (What I Meant to Say)"), accidental chloroethane inhalation.
- Vahan Chamlian, 96, Armenian-American secondhand clothes dealer and philanthropist.
- Jonathan Danilowitz, 77, Israeli flight attendant and LGBT activist, pancreatic cancer.
- Terrance Dean, 53, American author (Hiding in Hip Hop), academic and television executive (MTV).
- Arthur Goddard, 101, British-Australian engineer (Rover Company).
- Paul Green, 49, Australian rugby league player (Cronulla-Sutherland, Queensland) and coach (North Queensland), Rothmans Medal winner (1995), suicide.
- J. S. Grewal, 95, Indian historian and academic administrator, vice-chancellor of Guru Nanak Dev University (1981–1984).
- Rahimullah Haqqani, Afghan cleric, bombing.
- Anne Heche, 53, American actress (Donnie Brasco, Psycho, Another World), Emmy winner (1991), injuries sustained in a traffic collision.
- Roger Hughes, 88, American composer.
- Mohamed Huzam, 52, Maldivian playback singer (Sitee, Hifehettumeh Neiy Karuna, Hinithun).
- Hana Mazi Jamnik, 19, Slovenian cross-country skier, traffic collision.
- John Kelly, 78, Irish journalist and author.
- Colleen Mills, 66, New Zealand management academic.
- Yuri Mitev, 64, Bulgarian Olympic biathlete (1980, 1984).
- Hanae Mori, 96, Japanese fashion designer.
- Manuel Ojeda, 81, Mexican actor (Romancing the Stone, Laberintos de pasión, Alborada).
- Baburao Pacharne, 71, Indian politician, Maharashtra MLA (2014–2019), cancer.
- Cecile Pineda, 89, American author.
- Bill Pitman, 102, American guitarist and session musician (The Wrecking Crew), complications from a fall.
- Jean-Jacques Sempé, 89, French cartoonist (Le Petit Nicolas).
- Pauline Stroud, 92, British actress (Lady Godiva Rides Again), cancer.
- Shimoga Subbanna, 83, Indian playback singer (Kaadu Kudure), cardiac arrest.
- Morgan Taylor, 52, American illustrator (Gustafer Yellowgold) and songwriter, sepsis.
- David Tomassoni, 69, American politician, member (since 2001) and president (2020–2021) of the Minnesota Senate, Olympic ice hockey player (1984), complications from ALS.
- József Tóth, 70, Hungarian footballer (Pécsi Dózsa, Újpesti Dózsa, national team).
- Martin Wilson, 63, New Zealand environmentalist and festival organizer (Birdman Rally), prostate cancer.

=== 12 ===
- Don A. Anderson, 88, American politician, member of the Minnesota Senate (1983–1990), and businessman.
- Lyle Bradley, 79, Canadian ice hockey player (California Golden Seals, Cleveland Barons).
- Richard Caruso, 79, American entrepreneur, founder of Integra LifeSciences.
- Nigel Dodd, 57, British sociologist.
- Jessica Eriyo, 52, Ugandan social worker, politician and diplomat, MP (2001–2011) and minister of the environment (2006–2011), cancer.
- Robert Ferguson, 89, American physicist.
- Lillian Frank, 92, Burmese-born Australian hairdresser, philanthropist, and fashion influencer.
- Claudio Garella, 67, Italian footballer (Sampdoria, Hellas Verona, Napoli), complications from heart surgery.
- Ebrahim Qanbari-Mehr, 94, Iranian musical instrument maker.
- Louis Grillot, 90, French farmer and politician, senator (1998–2008).
- Anshu Jain, 59, Indian-British banker, co-CEO of Deutsche Bank (2012–2015), duodenal cancer.
- Keith Jamieson, 74, Australian country singer.
- Eino Kalpala, 96, Finnish Olympic alpine skier (1952).
- Motiullah Khan, 84, Pakistani field hockey player, Olympic champion (1960).
- Natalia LL, 85, Polish visual artist.
- Zbigniew Malicki, 77, Polish Olympic sailor.
- Dan Masterson, 88, American poet.
- Adèle Milloz, 26, French ski mountaineer, climbing fall.
- Togo Palazzi, 90, American basketball player (Boston Celtics, Syracuse Nationals) and coach (Holy Cross Crusaders).
- Ricardo Perdomo, 62, Uruguayan football player (Rayo Vallecano, Unión Española) and manager (Miramar Misiones).
- José Luis Pérez-Payá, 94, Spanish footballer (Atlético Madrid, Real Madrid, national team).
- Wolfgang Petersen, 81, German film director (Das Boot, The NeverEnding Story, Troy), pancreatic cancer.
- Dorli Rainey, 95, American political activist (Occupy Seattle).
- Helen Rankin, 90, American politician, member of the Maine House of Representatives (2008–2014).
- Teddy Ray, 32, American comedian (Wild 'n Out) and actor (House Party).
- Viacheslav Semenov, 74, Ukrainian footballer (Zorya Voroshilovhrad, Dnipro, Soviet Union national team), Olympic bronze medallist (1972).
- Amparín Serrano, 56, Mexican graphic designer.
- Ion Solonenco, 87, Moldovan army general.
- Virginia Spate, 84, British-born Australian art historian.
- Stanley Turkel, 96, American historian and hotel manager.
- Diego Uribe Vargas, 90, Colombian politician and diplomat, minister of foreign affairs (1978–1981).
- Billy Waith, 71, Welsh boxer.
- Aharon Yadlin, 96, Israeli educator and politician, MK (1959–1981) and minister of education (1974–1977).
- Lewis Jerome Zeigler, 78, Liberian Roman Catholic prelate, bishop of Gbarnga (2002–2009) and archbishop of Monrovia (2009–2021).

=== 13 ===
- Piero Angela, 93, Italian television host, science journalist, and writer.
- Tadeusz Bartczak, 87, Polish chemist and crystallographer.
- Michael W. Berns, 79, American biologist.
- Peter S. Bridges, 90, American diplomat, ambassador to Somalia (1984–1986).
- Wilson Callan, 82, Canadian politician.
- Randall B. Campbell, 81, American historian.
- Rossana Di Lorenzo, 84, Italian actress (Man and Wife, A Common Sense of Modesty, Le Bal).
- Denise Dowse, 64, American actress (Beverly Hills, 90210, The Guardian, Coach Carter), complications from meningitis.
- Robyn Griggs, 49, American actress (One Life to Live, Another World, Zombiegeddon), cervical cancer.
- James S. Hyde, 90, American biophysicist.
- John Chris Jones, 94, Welsh design researcher.
- David Kay, 82, American weapons inspector, lead of the Iraq Survey Group, cancer.
- Desanka Kovačević-Kojić, 96, Serbian historian.
- Maung Paw Tun, 87, Burmese writer, colon cancer.
- Antonino Orrù, 94, Italian Roman Catholic prelate, bishop of Ales-Terralba (1990–2004).
- Marta Palau Bosch, 88, Spanish-Mexican visual artist.
- Francisco Romero Portilla, 91, Guatemalan Olympic sport shooter.
- Iván Rodríguez, 85, Puerto Rican Olympic sprinter.
- Claude Salhani, 70, Egyptian photographer.
- Ângelo Domingos Salvador, 90, Brazilian Roman Catholic prelate, bishop of Coxim (1986–1991), Cachoeira do Sul (1991–1999) and Uruguaiana (1999–2007).
- Sedrak Saroyan, 54, Armenian general and politician, MP (2007–2018).
- John Train, 94, American investment advisor and writer.
- Steve Worster, 73, American football player (Texas Longhorns, Hamilton Tiger-Cats).
- Ekaterina Yosifova, 81, Bulgarian educator and poet.

=== 14 ===
- Rodolfo Bebán, 84, Argentine actor (Arm in Arm Down the Street, Juan Moreira, Hotel alojamiento).
- Kristaq Dhamo, 89, Albanian film director (Tana, Botë e padukshme, Nga mesi i errësirës) and actor.
- Robert E. Finnigan, 95, American chemist.
- Donald Foss, 78, American businessman, founder of Credit Acceptance, cancer.
- Freya, Norwegian walrus, euthanized.
- Nina Garsoïan, 99, French-born American Armenologist, dean of Princeton University Graduate School (1977–1979).
- Yosiwo George, 81, Micronesian diplomat and politician, governor of Kosrae (1983–1991) and vice president (since 2015), COVID-19.
- Stefan Gierowski, 97, Polish painter and avant garde artist.
- Déwé Gorodey, 73, New Caledonian writer and politician, vice president (2001–2009).
- Francesc Gras Salas, 101, Spanish ophthalmologist and writer.
- Rakesh Jhunjhunwala, 62, Indian investor and stock trader, founder of Akasa Air, complications from diabetes.
- George Kernek, 82, American baseball player (St. Louis Cardinals).
- Ambrose Lee, 73, Hong Kong politician, secretary for security (2003–2010), commissioner of the ICAC (2002–2003) and director of immigration (1998–2002), complications from a fall.
- Arne Legernes, 91, Norwegian footballer (SK Freidig, Larvik Turn, national team).
- Bernice Lott, 92, American social psychologist.
- Egle Martin, 86, Argentine singer, vedette and actress.
- Vinayak Mete, 52, Indian politician, Maharashtra MLC (since 2010), traffic collision.
- Anastasia Motaung, South African politician, member of the National Assembly (since 2019).
- Marshall Napier, 70, New Zealand-born Australian actor (Came a Hot Friday, Police Rescue, McLeod's Daughters), brain cancer.
- Svika Pick, 72, Polish-born Israeli singer and songwriter ("Diva").
- Dan Rapoport, 52, Soviet-born American investor, fall.
- James Riordan, 72, American politician, member of the Iowa Senate (1985–1995), complications from aspiration pneumonia and COVID-19.
- Nafis Sadik, 92, Pakistani civil servant, executive director of UNFPA (1987–2000).
- Roger H. Scherer, 87, American politician, member of the Minnesota House of Representatives (1967–1972).
- Anthony Simpson, 86, British politician, MEP (1979–1994)
- Lawrence Stepelevich, 92, American philosopher.
- Butch Thompson, 78, American jazz pianist and clarinetist.
- Baltash Tursymbaev, 75, Kazakh politician, minister of agriculture (1992–1993).
- Dmitri Vrubel, 62, Russian painter (My God, Help Me to Survive This Deadly Love), complications from COVID-19.

=== 15 ===
- Gar Baxter, 92, Canadian football player (Winnipeg Blue Bombers).
- Frederick Buechner, 96, American novelist (A Long Day's Dying, Godric) and theologian (Secrets in the Dark).
- Mike Burrows, 79, British bicycle designer, cancer.
- Pete Carril, 92, American college basketball coach (Reading HS, Lehigh, Princeton).
- Jaye Edwards, 103, British pilot.
- John Engen, 57, American politician, mayor of Missoula (since 2006), pancreatic cancer.
- Tomas Fischer, 81, Swedish businessman and book publisher, drowning.
- Daphne Godson, 90, Scottish violinist.
- Steve Grimmett, 62, English heavy metal singer (Grim Reaper, Onslaught, Lionsheart).
- Amy Halpern, 69, American experimental filmmaker.
- Irvin Head, 66, Canadian Indigenous sculptor.
- Lenny Johnrose, 52, English footballer (Bury, Blackburn Rovers, Burnley), complications from motor neurone disease.
- Sir Raymond Johnstone, 92, Scottish accountant, investment manager and public official.
- Barbara Kremen, 100, American writer.
- Bob Locker, 84, American baseball player (Chicago White Sox, Oakland Athletics, Chicago Cubs).
- Hugo Lusardi, 39, Paraguayan footballer (Club Nacional, Rubio Ñu, Deportivo Capiatá), cancer.
- Andrew J. Maloney, 90, American lawyer, U.S. attorney for the Eastern District of New York (1986–1992).
- Brian O'Connor, 64, American visual artist.
- Arthur Vercoe Pedlar, 89, British clown.
- Tsuneko Sasamoto, 107, Japanese photojournalist.
- Jane Silverthorne, 69, English-born American biologist.
- Reiji Suzuki, 93, Japanese politician, governor of Aichi prefecture (1987–1993).
- Nur Tabar, 81, Tajik writer and politician, people's deputy (1987–1990).
- Carme Travesset, 97, Andorran teacher, suffragist and politician.
- András Várhelyi, 68, Hungarian journalist and politician, MP (1998–2002).
- Harland Whitmore, 82, American economist.
- Rajmund Zieliński, 81, Polish Olympic cyclist (1964, 1968).
- Feliks Uciechowski, 101, Polish politician.

=== 16 ===
- Eric Boothroyd, 96, English speedway rider.
- Duggie Brown, 82, English comedian and actor (Coronation Street, The Final Cut, Kes).
- Stann Champion, 70, American musician.
- Frank Crowley, 83, Irish politician, TD (1981–1997).
- Kal David, 79, American blues guitarist and singer.
- Peter Davison, 95, British academic, authority on George Orwell.
- Joseph Delaney, 77, English author (Spook's).
- Dorothy Harley Eber, 97, British-born Canadian author, pneumonia.
- Robert Finn, 100, American mathematician.
- Charley Frazier, 83, American football player (Houston Oilers, Boston Patriots).
- Mark Girouard, 90, British architectural writer and historian.
- Eva-Maria Hagen, 87, German actress (Don't Forget My Little Traudel, Goods for Catalonia, Meine Freundin Sybille).
- Billy Hodgson, 86–87, Scottish footballer (Sheffield United, Derby County, York City). (death announced on this date)
- Anthony Hunt, 90, British structural engineer.
- Matti Lehtinen, 100, Finnish baritone singer.
- Peter Lloyd, 101, Australian aviator.
- Deanna B. Marcum, 76, American librarian.
- Stanisław Masternak, 76, Polish farmer and politician, MP (1993–2001) and starosta of Sandomierz County (2006–2018).
- Bruce Montague, 83, English actor (Butterflies, The Link Men, Hollyoaks).
- Bill Murdoch, 77, Canadian politician, Ontario MPP (1990–2011).
- Narayan, 81, Indian novelist (Kocharethi), COVID-19.
- Duro Onabule, 82, Nigerian journalist.
- Domenico Pace, 98, Italian Olympic fencer (1956).
- Rupchand Pal, 85, Indian politician, MP (1980–1984, 1989–2009).
- Hans Peterson, 99, Swedish children's author, suicide.
- Alex Polowin, 98, Lithuanian-born Canadian World War II veteran.
- John Rauch, 91, American architect, complications from dementia.
- Firangiz Rehimbeyli, 62, Azerbaijani singer and actress, heart attack.
- Odd Reinsfelt, 80, Norwegian meteorologist and politician, mayor of Bærum (1992–2011).
- Rico, 51, Scottish singer-songwriter.
- Doug Ross, 70, American college ice hockey player (Bowling Green) and coach (Kent State, Alabama-Huntsville).
- Moqut Ruffins, 38, American football player (Louisiana Tech Bulldogs, Bossier–Shreveport Battle Wings, Jacksonville Sharks).
- William S. Rukeyser, 83, American journalist.
- Fedor Shcherbakov, 75, Kazakh military officer, commander-in-chief of the ground forces (1994–2000).
- Subhash Singh, 59, Indian politician, Bihar MLA (since 2000), kidney failure.
- Wayne Yates, 84, American basketball player (Los Angeles Lakers, Oakland Oaks) and coach (Memphis State Tigers).
- Aydın Yelken, 83, Turkish footballer (Fenerbahçe, Karagümrük, national team).
- Bachir Yellès, 100, Algerian painter.
- Viktor Zozulin, 77, Russian actor (Operation Y and Shurik's Other Adventures, I Loved You, King Stag).

=== 17 ===
- Irving Biederman, 83, American vision scientist.
- Chen Man Hin, 97, Chinese-born Malaysian politician, MP (1969–1990) and Negeri Sembilan MLA (1965–1982).
- Sir Toby Curtis, 82, New Zealand educationalist and Māori leader (Te Arawa).
- Mabel DeWare, 96, Canadian politician, senator (1990–2001) and New Brunswick MLA (1978–1987).
- Hellmut Flashar, 92, German philologist.
- Niccolò Ghedini, 62, Italian lawyer and politician, MP (since 2001), leukemia.
- Ingvar Gíslason, 96, Icelandic politician, MP (1961–1987) and minister of education (1980–1983).
- Earl Michael Irving, 69, American diplomat.
- Shigeaki Kato, 75, Japanese politician, member of the House of Representatives (1990–1993).
- Robert Kime, 76, British interior decorator and antiques dealer.
- Motomu Kiyokawa, 87, Japanese voice actor (Neon Genesis Evangelion, Hellsing, By the Grace of the Gods), pneumonia.
- Julie Larson, 62, American cartoonist (The Dinette Set).
- Farid Makari, 74, Lebanese politician, MP (1992–2014), lung cancer.
- Jack H. McDonald, 90, American politician, member of the U.S. House of Representatives (1967–1973).
- Zdeněk Mraček, 92, Czech neurosurgeon and politician, mayor of Plzeň (1990–1994).
- Jim Mueller, 79, American sportscaster (Cleveland Browns).
- Mahdi Mujahid, 33–34, Afghan Hazara militia commander (Balkhab uprising), shot.
- Maureen Ogden, 93, American politician, member of the New Jersey General Assembly (1982–1996).
- Arthur Pound, 92, Australian footballer (Melbourne, Brighton).
- Rick Reed, 69, American advertising agent.
- James R. Rettig, 71, American librarian, president of the American Library Association (2008–2009).
- Sir David Smith, 89, Australian public servant, official secretary to the governor-general (1973–1990).
- Michael Tuck, 76, American journalist and news anchor, complications from a stroke.

=== 18 ===
- Mislav Bago, 48, Croatian journalist and broadcaster.
- Ray Cresp, 93, Australian speedway rider.
- Michel Doublet, 82, French politician, senator (1989–2014) and mayor of Trizay (since 1977).
- Hadrawi, 79, Somali poet and songwriter.
- Clayton Jacobson II, 88, American inventor, developer of the jet ski.
- Rolf Kühn, 92, German jazz clarinetist.
- Ellen Leonard, 88, Canadian systematic theologian.
- István Liptay, 87, Hungarian Olympic basketball player (1960).
- Robert Q. Lovett, 95, American film editor (The Taking of Pelham One Two Three, The Cotton Club, A Bronx Tale).
- Sombat Metanee, 85, Thai actor (Sugar Is Not Sweet, Tears of the Black Tiger) and politician, MP (2006–2007).
- Mari Montegriffo, 72, Gibraltarian politician, MP (1984–2007) and mayor of Gibraltar (1988–1995).
- Herbert Mullin, 75, American serial killer.
- Rita Ndzanga, 88, South African anti-apartheid activist and politician, MP (1999–2004).
- Felix Novikov, 95, Russian architect (Krasnopresnenskaya metro station).
- Tom Palmer, 81, American comic book artist (The Tomb of Dracula, Batman, The Avengers).
- Virginia Patton, 97, American actress (It's a Wonderful Life, Black Eagle, The Lucky Stiff).
- John Powell, 75, American discus thrower, Olympic bronze medalist (1976, 1984).
- Milt Ramírez, 72, Puerto Rican baseball player (St. Louis Cardinals, Oakland Athletics).
- Josephine Tewson, 91, British actress (Keeping Up Appearances, Last of the Summer Wine, Gabrielle and the Doodleman).

=== 19 ===
- Elizabeth Bailey, 83, American economist.
- Warren Bernhardt, 83, American jazz pianist (Steps Ahead, Steely Dan).
- Chang Ching-hui, 80, Taiwanese politician, MP (2005–2008), pancreatic cancer.
- Harold Chapman, 95, British photographer.
- Raymonde Dien, 93, French political activist.
- Dan Ferro, 61, American actor (Falcon Crest, Death Wish 4: The Crackdown, Sgt. Bilko).
- Harrison Gray, 80, Canadian ice hockey player (Detroit Red Wings).
- Edmund Hein, 82, German economist and politician, member of the Landtag of Saarland (1970–1994).
- Dick Jochums, 81, American swimmer.
- Tekla Juniewicz, 116, Polish supercentenarian, stroke.
- Ted Kirkpatrick, 62, American musician (Tourniquet), idiopathic pulmonary fibrosis.
- Per Knutsen, 71, Norwegian writer.
- Mildred Kornman, 97, American actress (Our Gang) and model.
- Jorge Luis Lona, 86, Argentine Roman Catholic prelate, coadjutor bishop (2000–2001) and bishop (2001–2011) of San Luis.
- Michael Malone, 79, American author and television writer (Another World, One Life to Live).
- David Marsh, 88, British amateur golfer and football administrator, chairman of Everton F.C. (1991–1994).
- Egon Pajenk, 72, Austrian footballer (SK Rapid Wien, Admira, national team).
- Riddick Parker, 49, American football player (Seattle Seahawks, Baltimore Ravens, New England Patriots).
- Patrick Pearson, 92, British philatelist.
- John Tirman, 72, American political theorist, cardiac arrest.
- Ivan Vladychenko, 98, Ukrainian trade unionist and politician.
- John Wockenfuss, 73, American baseball player (Detroit Tigers, Philadelphia Phillies), complications from dementia.

=== 20 ===
- Samar Banerjee, 92, Indian Olympic footballer (1956), COVID-19.
- Barry Boehm, 87, American computer scientist and software engineer.
- Theodore Bugas, 98, American politician, member of the Oregon House of Representatives (1977–1983), COVID-19.
- Louis Burgio, 68, American gerontologist.
- Civan Canova, 67, Turkish actor (Home Coming, Üç Kuruş, Fatmagül'ün Suçu Ne?), lung cancer.
- Jonathan Destin, 27, French writer and anti-bullying activist.
- Darya Dugina, 29, Russian political activist, car bombing.
- Gail Finney, 63, American politician, member of the Kansas House of Representatives (since 2009).
- Séamus Freeman, 78, Irish Roman Catholic prelate, bishop of Ossory (2007–2016).
- Pradeep Giri, 77, Nepali politician, MP (1994–1999, since 2018), throat cancer.
- Joan Gould, 95, American author and journalist.
- Helen Grayco, 97, American singer (The Spike Jones Show) and actress (That Certain Age, A Night at the Opera), cancer.
- Bill Haller, 87, American baseball umpire (Major League Baseball).
- Audun Heimdal, 25, Norwegian orienteer, cancer.
- Kate Holbrook, 50, American historian and writer, eye cancer.
- Franz Hummel, 83, German composer and pianist.
- Cláudia Jimenez, 63, Brazilian actress and comedienne (O Corpo, Escolinha do Professor Raimundo, Sai de Baixo).
- Maurice Kanbar, 93, American entrepreneur and film producer (Hoodwinked!).
- Masahiro Kobayashi, 68, Japanese film director (Bashing, The Rebirth, Haru's Journey), cancer.
- Jacques Mahéas, 83, French politician, senator (1995–2011) and mayor of Neuilly-sur-Marne (1977–2020).
- Marion Mann, 102, American physician and pathologist.
- Alessandro Messina, 80, Italian-born Canadian Olympic cyclist.
- Nayyara Noor, 71, Pakistani playback singer (Aina).
- Osthathios Pathros, 58, Indian Syriac Orthodox prelate, metropolitan of Bangalore (since 2006).
- Bram Peper, 82, Dutch politician, mayor of Rotterdam (1982–1998) and minister of the interior and kingdom relations (1998–2000).
- Syed Sibtey Razi, 83, Indian politician, twice MP, governor of Jharkhand (2004–2009) and Assam (2009), heart disease.
- Román Solís Zelaya, 68, Costa Rican jurist, justice of the Supreme Court (since 2001).
- Leon Vitali, 74, English actor (Barry Lyndon, Eyes Wide Shut, The Fenn Street Gang).
- Tom Weiskopf, 79, American golfer (PGA Tour), pancreatic cancer.
- Dean Westlake, 62, American politician, member of the Alaska House of Representatives (2017), beaten.

=== 21 ===
- David Armstrong, 67, English footballer (Middlesbrough, Southampton, national team).
- Richard S. Cordrey, 88, American politician, member of the Delaware House of Representatives (1971–1973) and senate (1973–1997).
- Celia Correas de Zapata, 88, Argentine writer and poet.
- Albert E. Cowdrey, 88, American author.
- E. Bryant Crutchfield, 85, American executive, inventor of the Trapper Keeper, bone cancer.
- Oliver Frey, 74, Swiss visual artist.
- Vincent Gil, 83, Australian actor (Mad Max, Stone, Prisoner).
- Anabel Gutiérrez, 90, Mexican actress (School for Tramps, Little Trapeze Angels) and comedian (Chespirito).
- Nikolai Lebedev, 100, Russian actor (Yevdokiya, Eternal Call, Air Crew).
- Sela Molisa, 72, Vanuatuan politician, MP (1982–2012) and minister of finance and economic management (2008–2010).
- Augustino Mrema, 77, Tanzanian politician, MP (1985–1995, since 2010) and minister of home affairs (1990–1995).
- Michael O'Connor, 108, Irish centenarian.
- Alexei Panshin, 82, American writer (Rite of Passage, The World Beyond the Hill) and science fiction critic.
- Zalo Reyes, 69, Chilean singer, complications from diabetes.
- Jamey Rootes, 55, American sports executive (Houston Texans, Columbus Crew).
- Peter Stone, 67, Australian soccer player (Western Suburbs, APIA Leichhardt, national team).
- Monnette Sudler, 70, American jazz guitarist.
- Hüseyin Sungur, 90–91, Turkish politician, member of the Grand National Assembly (1973–1977).
- Donald C. Thompson, 91, American vice admiral.
- Irvin Warrican, 56, Vincentian cricketer (Windward Islands).
- Robert Williams, 72, Greek composer and singer.

=== 22 ===
- Jerry Allison, 82, American Hall of Fame drummer (The Crickets) and songwriter ("That'll Be the Day", "Peggy Sue").
- Edmund Borowski, 77, Polish sprinter.
- Jaimie Branch, 39, American jazz trumpeter and composer, accidental drug overdose.
- Shalom Cohen, 91, Israeli rabbi, rosh yeshiva of Porat Yosef Yeshiva (since 1966).
- Adnan Coker, 94, Turkish painter.
- Kay Dalton, 90, American football coach (Kansas City Chiefs, Denver Broncos, Montreal Alouettes).
- David Douglas-Home, 15th Earl of Home, 78, British businessman and hereditary peer, member of the House of Lords (since 1996).
- Manouchehr Esmaeili, 83, Iranian voice actor.
- Robert Fraisse, 88, French Olympic fencer.
- Gary Gaines, 73, American football coach (Abilene Christian, Permian), subject of Friday Night Lights, complications from Alzheimer's disease.
- Beverly Grigsby, 94, American composer and musicologist.
- Brian Kenny, 84, Irish hurler.
- Rahimuddin Khan, 96, Pakistani military officer, Chairman Joint Chiefs of Staff Committee (1984–1987), governor of Balochistan (1978–1984) and Sindh (1988).
- Fred Lyon, 97, American photographer.
- Katinka Mann, 97, American artist and sculptor.
- Héctor Moni, 86, Argentine Olympic rower (1960).
- Tycho Q. Mrsich, 96, German Egyptologist.
- György Pásztor, 99, Hungarian Hall of Fame ice hockey player (Budapesti Korcsolyázó Egylet, Csepel, national team) and executive.
- Jiří Pechar, 93, Czech philosopher, translator and literary critic.
- Erkki Pulliainen, 84, Finnish biologist and politician, MP (1987–2011).
- Abdul Halim Abdul Rahman, 82, Malaysian politician, MP (2004–2013).
- Theo Sommer, 92, German newspaper editor (Die Zeit) and intellectual.
- Mohamed Sourour, 82, Moroccan Olympic boxer (1968, 1972).
- António de Sousa Braga, 81, Portuguese Roman Catholic prelate, bishop of Angra (1996–2016).
- Fredy Studer, 74, Swiss drummer.
- Creed Taylor, 93, American jazz trumpeter and record producer, founder of Impulse! Records and CTI Records.
- Margaret Urlich, 57, New Zealand singer ("Escaping", "Number One (Remember When We Danced All Night)", "Boy in the Moon"), cancer.
- Gérard Vignoble, 76, French technician and politician, MP (1988–1997, 2002–2007).
- Rembert Weakland, 95, American Roman Catholic prelate, archbishop of Milwaukee (1977–2002).

=== 23 ===
- Gino Cogliandro, 72, Italian actor (Joan Lui, Italian Fast Food, Fantozzi 2000 – La clonazione) and stand-up comedian.
- Rolando Cubela Secades, 89, Cuban revolutionary, co-founder of the Directorio Revolucionario Estudiantil.
- Barbara Cunningham, 96, Australian Olympic gymnast (1956).
- Sandra Deal, 80, American education advocate, first lady of Georgia (2011–2019), breast cancer.
- Božidar Delić, 66, Serbian military officer and politician, vice president of the National Assembly (2007–2012, since 2022).
- William Doe, 81, Australian gastroenterologist and professor of medicine.
- Carlos Duarte, 89, Portuguese footballer (Porto, national team).
- Steven Hoffenberg, 77, American businessman (Towers Financial Corporation) and convicted fraudster, owner of the New York Post (1993). (body discovered on this date)
- Esther Cooper Jackson, 105, American civil rights activist and social worker.
- Wolfgang Jobst, 65, Australian Olympic sport shooter.
- Kim Jong-hwan, 98, South Korean military officer and politician, minister of the interior (1979–1980).
- Larry Laudan, 80, American philosopher.
- Luiz Mancilha Vilela, 80, Brazilian Roman Catholic prelate, bishop of Cachoeiro de Itapemirim (1985–2002) and archbishop of Vitória (2002–2018).
- Vytjie Mentor, 58, South African politician, MP (2002–2014).
- Ruslan Panteleymonov, 39, Ukrainian-born British artistic gymnast.
- Nigel Paul, 89, English cricketer (Warwickshire).
- Sonali Phogat, 42, Indian politician.
- Lev Pitaevskii, 89, Russian theoretical physicist (Gross–Pitaevskii equation).
- Gerald Potterton, 91, British-Canadian animator and film director (Heavy Metal, Yellow Submarine, The Smoggies).
- Julian Robertson, 90, American hedge fund manager and philanthropist, founder of Tiger Management.
- David Shaw, 71, British politician, MP (1987–1997).
- Winston Stona, 82, Jamaican actor (The Harder They Come, Cool Runnings, One Love) and businessman.
- S. V. Venugopan Nair, 77, Indian writer.
- José Vivas, 94, Venezuelan architect.
- Dean Young, 67, American poet, complications from COVID-19.

=== 24 ===
- Hérard Abraham, 82, Haitian military officer and politician, acting president (1990), commander-in-chief of the armed forces (1990–1991) and twice minister of foreign affairs.
- Jack K. Berry, 91, American politician.
- Len Dawson, 87, American Hall of Fame football player (Pittsburgh Steelers, Dallas Texans/Kansas City Chiefs) and broadcaster (Inside the NFL).
- Orlando de la Torre, 78, Peruvian footballer (Sporting Cristal, national team).
- Jorge Domínguez, 77, Argentine politician, minister of defense (1996–1999) and mayor of Buenos Aires (1994–1996), pneumonia.
- Tim Donoho, 66, American entrepreneur.
- Ochirdolgoryn Enkhtaivan, 70, Mongolian Olympic wrestler.
- Charlie Finch, 68, American art critic, suicide by jumping.
- Charlie Ford, 73, American football player (Chicago Bears, Philadelphia Eagles, Buffalo Bills).
- Kazuo Inamori, 90, Japanese entrepreneur, founder of Kyocera and KDDI and chairman of Japan Airlines (since 2010).
- Paul Knox, 88, Canadian ice hockey player (Toronto Maple Leafs), Olympic bronze medalist (1956).
- Aram Kocharyan, 68, Armenian politician, governor of Lori Province (2006–2011).
- Man of the Hole, 60s, Brazilian indigenous person. (body discovered on this date)
- Nicola Materazzi, 83, Italian mechanical engineer (Ferrari 288 GTO, Ferrari F40, Bugatti EB 110).
- Tim Page, 78, English photographer, liver cancer.
- Lily Renée, 101, Austrian-born American comic book artist.
- William Reynolds, 90, American actor (The F.B.I., The Gallant Men, The Islanders), pneumonia.
- Mahbub Talukdar, 80, Bangladeshi poet and civil servant, election commissioner (2017–2022), cancer.
- Joe E. Tata, 85, American actor (Beverly Hills, 90210, Unholy Rollers, The Rockford Files), complications from Alzheimer's disease.
- Kallistos Ware, 87, English Orthodox prelate and theologian, metropolitan of Dioclea in Phrygia (since 2007).
- Zhu Xiangzhong, 89, Chinese diplomat, ambassador to Peru (1988–1990) and Chile (1990–1995).

=== 25 ===
- Devidhan Besra, 77, Indian politician, Bihar MLA (1980–1990), Jharkhand MLA (2000–2005) and MP (2009–2014).
- Kimmo Blom, 52, Finnish singer (Raskasta Joulua), cancer. (death announced on this date)
- Sherry Colb, 56, American legal scholar.
- Ronald Crimm, 87, American politician, member of the Kentucky House of Representatives (1996–2017).
- Justo de las Cuevas, 90, Spanish politician, deputy (1977–1982), president of the Cantabrian parliament (1972–1982).
- Joey DeFrancesco, 51, American jazz musician.
- Inez Foxx, 84, American R&B singer ("Mockingbird").
- Ken Frailing, 74, American baseball player (Chicago Cubs, Chicago White Sox).
- Graziella Galvani, 91, Italian actress (Shivers in Summer, Seduction, Miracles Still Happen).
- Enzo Garinei, 96, Italian actor (Toto, Peppino and the Fanatics, No, the Case Is Happily Resolved, Banana Joe).
- Stephen Glasser, 79, American publisher, founder of the Legal Times.
- Patsy Gormley, 88, Northern Irish Gaelic footballer (Claudy).
- Kurt Gottfried, 93, Austrian-born American physicist, co-founder of the Union of Concerned Scientists.
- Fermín Hontou, 65, Uruguayan cartoonist and illustrator.
- Ron Hutcherson, 79, American racing driver (NASCAR, ARCA).
- Mable John, 91, American R&B singer ("Your Good Thing (Is About to End)").
- Ken Jones, 81, Welsh rugby union player (Llanelli, Cardiff, national team).
- Roger Jouet, 77, French writer and politician, member of the Regional Council of Normandy (1986–1992) and mayor of Trévières (1971–1994).
- Dale Joseph Melczek, 83, American Roman Catholic prelate, auxiliary bishop of Detroit (1983–1992) and bishop of Gary (1996–2014).
- Nel Noddings, 93, American feminist, educator, and philosopher.
- Giles Radice, Baron Radice, 85, British politician, MP (1973–2001) and member of the House of Lords (2001–2022), cancer.
- Radovan Radović, 86, Serbian basketball player (BSK, Kartizan, 1960 Yugoslav Olympic team) and coach.
- John Mercer Reid, 85, Canadian politician, MP (1965–1984), cancer.
- Alan Rogers, 98, English football manager (Persepolis, Chicago Spurs, Philippines national team).
- Richard Setlowe, 89, American author and journalist.
- Andrei Slavnov, 82, Russian theoretical physicist (Slavnov–Taylor identities).
- Saawan Kumar Tak, 86, Indian film director (Saajan Bina Suhagan, Souten, Sanam Bewafa), producer and lyricist, lung disease.
- Orval Tessier, 89, Canadian ice hockey player (Boston Bruins, Montreal Canadiens) and coach (Chicago Blackhawks).
- Elly Tumwine, 68, Ugandan military officer and politician, MP (since 1986).
- Ken Van Heekeren, 89, Australian rugby league player (Eastern Suburbs).
- Herman Vanspringel, 79, Belgian road racing cyclist.

=== 26 ===
- David Auker, 73, British actor (A Bridge Too Far, Bottle Boys, Bridget Jones: The Edge of Reason).
- Joel Baillargeon, 57, Canadian ice hockey player (Winnipeg Jets, Quebec Nordiques), fall.
- Clyde N. Baker Jr., 92, American geotechnical engineer.
- Luke Bell, 32, American country singer-songwriter, fentanyl intoxication.
- Dame Valerie Beral, 76, Australian-born British epidemiologist (Million Women Study).
- Tony Berry, 81, British businessman, founder of Blue Arrow.
- Charlie Brown, 86, American basketball player (Seattle Chieftains).
- Pete Burnside, 92, American baseball player (New York / San Francisco Giants, Washington Senators, Detroit Tigers).
- Ronald J. Glasser, 83, American physician and author.
- Albert J. Herberger, 91, American vice admiral.
- Daikichi Ishibashi, 90, Japanese politician, member of the House of Representatives (1986–2000).
- William V. McBride, 100, American Air Force general, vice chief of staff (1975–1978).
- Jože Mencinger, 81, Slovenian lawyer, economist and politician.
- Roland Mesnier, 78, French-born American chef and author, White House executive pastry chef (1980–2004), complications from cancer.
- Aldo Mirate, 79, Italian politician, deputy (1972–1979).
- Robert H. Shadley, 96, American politician.
- Espen Skjønberg, 98, Norwegian actor (One Day in the Life of Ivan Denisovich, A Handful of Time, The Last Lieutenant).
- Amy Stechler, 67, American filmmaker.
- Paul Tauer, 86, American politician, mayor of Aurora, Colorado (1987–2003). (death announced on this date)
- Jalaluddin Umri, 87, Indian Islamic scholar, amir of Jamaat-e-Islami Hind (2007–2019).
- Judy Valentine, 99, American singer and children's television actress.
- Slavko Večerin, 65, Serbian Roman Catholic prelate, bishop of Subotica (since 2020).
- Wang Weiqi, 83, Chinese biomedician, member of the Chinese Academy of Engineering.
- Sue Wills, 77, Australian academic and activist, co-founder of the Campaign Against Moral Persecution.
- Hana Zagorová, 75, Czech singer-songwriter and actress (The Hit, Hrubeš a Mareš jsou kamarádi do deště).

=== 27 ===
- Dave Bailey, 77, Canadian Olympic runner (1968) and pharmacologist.
- Iulian-Gabriel Bîrsan, 65, Romanian engineer and politician, deputy (2004).
- Tadeusz Ferenc, 82, Polish economist and politician, deputy (2001–2002) and mayor of Rzeszów (2002–2021).
- Kenneth Foulkes, 78, English rugby league player (Castleford, Hull).
- Michael S. Hinson Jr., 55, American activist.
- Imdad Hussaini, 82, Pakistani writer and poet.
- William A. Jenkins, 104, American coast guard rear admiral, COVID-19 and pneumonia.
- Gavin Jones, 81, Australian demographer.
- Suleiman Kangangi, 33, Kenyan racing cyclist, traffic collision.
- Karl Lamers, 86, German politician, MP (1980–2002).
- Richard F. Larsen, 86, American politician.
- Robert LuPone, 76, American actor (Jesus Christ Superstar, The Sopranos, A Chorus Line), pancreatic cancer.
- Amanda Mackey, 70, American casting director (The Fugitive, A League of Their Own, The Hunt for Red October), myelodysplastic syndrome.
- Leslie Megahey, 77, British television producer, director and writer.
- Robert Mitchell, 50, British Olympic speed skater (1998).
- Tony Nelson, 92, Welsh footballer (Newport County, Bournemouth).
- Vicenç Pagès, 58, Spanish writer and literary critic, cancer.
- Mogens Palle, 88, Danish Hall of Fame boxing promoter and manager, melanoma.
- Georges Al Rassi, 42, Lebanese singer, traffic collision.
- Manolo Sanlúcar, 78, Spanish flamenco composer and guitarist.
- Theodor Heinrich Schiebler, 99, German anatomist.
- Milutin Šoškić, 84, Serbian football player (Partizan, Yugoslavia national team) and manager (OFK Beograd), Olympic champion (1960).
- Ferenc Stámusz, 88, Hungarian Olympic racing cyclist (1960, 1964).
- Emilio Trivini, 84, Italian rower, Olympic silver medallist (1964).
- Horst Vetter, 94, German politician, member of the Abgeordnetenhaus of Berlin (1971–1986).

=== 28 ===
- Stefan Arczyński, 106, German-born Polish photographer.
- Mary A. Bomar, 78, English-born American government official, director of the National Park Service (2006–2009).
- Gil Cawood, 82, New Zealand Olympic rower (1968), world championship bronze medallist (1970).
- Bicky Chakraborty, 79, Indian-born Swedish businessman.
- Vincent Cheng, 74, Hong Kong banker, MLC (1991–1995) and chairman of HSBC (2005–2010).
- Sammy Chung, 90, English football player (Norwich City, Watford) and manager (Doncaster Rovers).
- Ralph Eggleston, 56, American animator (The Lion King, WALL-E) and film director (For the Birds), Oscar winner (2001), colon infection.
- Kenneth Fang, 83, Hong Kong industrialist and philanthropist.
- Florence S. Farley, 94, American politician.
- Saroj Kumari Gaurihar, 93, Indian writer and politician, Madhya Pradesh MLA (1967–1972).
- Fu Kuiqing, 101, Chinese military officer, political commissar of the Nanjing Military Region (1985–1990).
- Roger-Claude Guignard, 87, Swiss Olympic sailor (1980).
- Manzoor Hussain, 63, Pakistani field hockey player, Olympic champion (1984).
- Kamen Kostadinov, 51, Bulgarian politician, MP (2005–2009).
- Oleksii Kovalov, 33, Ukrainian politician, deputy (since 2019), shot.
- Gastone Simoni, 85, Italian Roman Catholic prelate, bishop of Prato (1992–2012).
- Michael D. Smigiel Sr., 64, American politician, member of the Maryland House of Delegates (2003–2015), heart disease.
- Frank Webb, 94, American watercolor painter.
- Tucker Wiard, 80, American television editor (Murphy Brown, The Carol Burnett Show, Alice), five-time Emmy winner, complications from heart failure.
- John Baptist Ye Ronghua, 91, Chinese Roman Catholic prelate, bishop of Xing'anfu (since 2000).
- Peter Stephan Zurbriggen, 79, Swiss Roman Catholic archbishop, apostolic nuncio to Austria (2009–2018).

=== 29 ===
- Norman H. Anderson, 97, American social psychologist.
- Mick Bates, 74, Welsh politician, AM (1999–2011), cancer.
- Paul-Marie Cao Ðình Thuyên, 95, Vietnamese Roman Catholic prelate, bishop of Vinh (1992–2010).
- Charlbi Dean, 32, South African actress (Triangle of Sadness, Spud, Black Lightning) and model, sepsis.
- Patrick B. Gillespie, 76, American politician, member of the Pennsylvania House of Representatives (1975–1978).
- Sam Glucksberg, 89, Canadian psychologist.
- Vladimir Gusev, 90, Russian politician, deputy (1994–2000), senator (2001–2012) and deputy premier (1985–1990).
- Gwendolyn Midlo Hall, 93, American historian.
- John Hansen, 83, Danish Olympic rower.
- Nancy Hiller, 63, American cabinetmaker and author, pancreatic cancer.
- Pat McGeer, 95, Canadian physician, Olympic basketball player (1948) and politician, British Columbia MLA (1962–1986).
- Vince McNeice, 83, English footballer (Watford).
- Pradip Mukherjee, 76, Indian actor (Jana Aranya, Dooratwa, Utsab), pneumonia.
- Craig Powell, 81, Australian poet.
- Jai Ram Reddy, 85, Fijian politician, MP (1972–1987, 1992–1999), attorney-general (1987) and twice president of the court of appeal.
- Rigoberto Riasco, 69, Panamanian boxer, WBC super bantamweight champion (1976).
- Ron de Roode, 57, Dutch footballer (Den Haag).
- Wafiq al-Samarrai, 75, Iraqi intelligence officer, director of general military intelligence (1990–1991), cancer.
- Abhijit Sen, 72, Indian economist, member of the planning commission (2004–2014), heart attack.
- Melvin Sokolsky, 88, American photographer and film director.
- Tom Strachan, 48, Australian businessman, plane crash.
- Hans-Christian Ströbele, 83, German lawyer and politician, MP (1985–1987, 1998–2017).
- John P. Varkey, 52, Indian guitarist (Avial) and composer (Frozen).
- Ernie Zampese, 86, American football coach (San Diego Chargers, San Diego State Aztecs).

=== 30 ===
- Michael Adams, 88, British Royal Air Force officer.
- Gheorghe Berceanu, 72, Romanian wrestler, Olympic champion (1972).
- Eve Borsook, 92, Canadian-born American art historian, teacher and author.
- Robert Brawner, 92, American swimmer.
- Thomas Carney, 82, English-American mixologist.
- Sir Graeme Davies, 85, New Zealand engineer, academic and administrator.
- Eddie Deerfield, 99, American government official and World War II veteran.
- Karel Eykman, 86, Dutch children's book writer.
- Irwin Glusker, 98, American art director.
- Mikhail Gorbachev, 91, Russian politician, final general secretary of the Communist Party (1985–1991) and president of the Soviet Union (1990–1991), Nobel Prize laureate (1990).
- Francesc Granell, 78, Spanish economist and academic, cardiac arrest.
- Elizabeth Gunn, 95, American mystery author.
- Fauziyya Hassan, 80, Maldivian actress (Emme Fahu Dhuvas, Umurah, Hiyy Halaaku).
- Brian Herbinson, 91, Northern Irish-born Canadian equestrian, Olympic bronze medallist (1956).
- Jaak Kangilaski, 82, Estonian art historian.
- Ruth Lapide, 93, German theologian and historian.
- Don Lind, 92, American astronaut.
- Liu Shunsong, 69, Taiwanese politician, member of the Miaoli County Council (since 2014), COVID-19.
- Ron Logan, 84, American entertainment executive (Walt Disney Entertainment).
- Tadeusz Myler, 73, Polish politician, deputy (2001–2005).
- Bob Russell, 91, Canadian politician.
- Arthur Secunda, 94, American painter and sculptor.
- Michael Slocombe, 81, English footballer (Welton Rovers, Bristol Rovers, Bath City).
- Steve White, 48, American football player (Tampa Bay Buccaneers, New York Jets) and blogger (SB Nation), leukemia.
- George Woods, 79, American shot putter, Olympic silver medalist (1968, 1972).

=== 31 ===
- Richard F. Abel, 88–89, American brigadier general.
- Kadyr Baikenov, 77, Kazakh politician, minister of energy and fuel resources (1992–1994).
- Bang Young-ung, 80, South Korean novelist.
- Lorraine Botha, 57, South African politician, Western Cape MPP (since 2014), heart attack.
- Michel Briand, 91, French Olympic sailor.
- Normand Chaurette, 68, Canadian playwright.
- Richard Cook, 68–69, American system safety researcher and physician.
- James Cowan, 93, Scottish cricketer.
- Carlos Cuadra, 96, American computer scientist and filmmaker.
- Ed Gregory, 90, American basketball scout, coach, and executive.
- Allan Hawke, 74, Australian public servant, chief of staff to the prime minister (1993–1996), high commissioner to New Zealand (2003–2005) and chancellor of ANU (2006–2008), cancer.
- Klaudia Hornung, 60, German Olympic rower (1984).
- Alexander Horváth, 83, Slovak football player (MŠK Žilina, Slovan Bratislava) and manager (R.W.D. Molenbeek).
- Zeno Karcz, 87, Canadian football player (Hamilton Tiger-Cats).
- Domingo Liotta, 97, Argentine heart surgeon.
- Francesco Manganelli, 79, Italian politician, deputy (1994–1996), and writer.
- Sir Francis McWilliams, 96, Scottish engineer, lord mayor of London (1992–1993).
- Mary Noel Menezes, 92, Guyanese historian.
- Lorinda Roland, 84, American sculptor.
- Jim Ryan, 86, American television writer (Tom & Jerry Kids, The Pink Panther Show, The U.S. of Archie).
- Mark Shreeve, 65, British electronic music composer (Redshift) and songwriter ("Touch Me (I Want Your Body)").
- Lee Thomas, 86, American baseball player (Boston Red Sox, Los Angeles Angels) and executive (Philadelphia Phillies).
- Bill Turnbull, 66, British journalist and presenter (BBC Breakfast, Songs of Praise, Think Tank), prostate cancer.
- Charles Wilson, 87, Scottish journalist and newspaper editor (The Times, The Independent), blood cancer.
- David Young, 73, English musician (John Cale, Element of Crime).
