= Schiebler =

Schiebler is a surname. Notable people with the surname include:

- Jeff Schiebler (born 1973), Canadian athlete
- Theodor Heinrich Schiebler (1923–2022), German anatomist

== See also ==
- Schieber
