= Schieber =

Schieber is a German surname. Notable people with the surname include:

- Julian Schieber (born 1989), German footballer
- Walter Schieber (1896–1960), Nazi SS officer

== See also ==
- Jass, a card game
- Schiebler
