= Jack K. Berry =

American politician (1930–2022)

Member of the Georgia House of Representatives from the 113-2 district
- In office 1967–1969

Personal details
- Born: Jack Keith Berry; August 30, 1930 Colleton County, South Carolina, U.S.
- Died: August 24, 2022 (aged 91) Savannah, Georgia, U.S.
- Party: Democratic
- Education: The Citadel, The Military College of South Carolina; Emory University School of Law

Jack Keith Berry (August 30, 1930 – August 24, 2022) was an American politician. He was a Democratic Party member for the 113-2 district of the Georgia House of Representatives.

== Life and career ==
Berry was born August 30, 1930, in Colleton County, South Carolina. He attended Savannah High School, The Citadel and Emory University School of Law.

Berry sat in the Georgia House of Representatives from 1967 to 1969.

He died on August 24, 2022, in Savannah, Georgia, at the age of 91.
