= Horst Vetter =

German businessman and politician (1927–2022)

Member of the Abgeordnetenhaus of Berlin
- In office 1971–1986

Personal details
- Born: 28 August 1927 Berlin, Brandenburg, Prussia, Germany
- Died: 27 August 2022 (aged 94)
- Party: FDP
- Occupation: Businessman

Horst Vetter (28 August 1927 – 27 August 2022) was a German politician. A member of the Free Democratic Party, he served in the Abgeordnetenhaus of Berlin from 1971 to 1986.

Vetter died on 27 August 2022, at the age of 94.
