= Stann Champion =

American singer-songwriter (1952 – 2022)

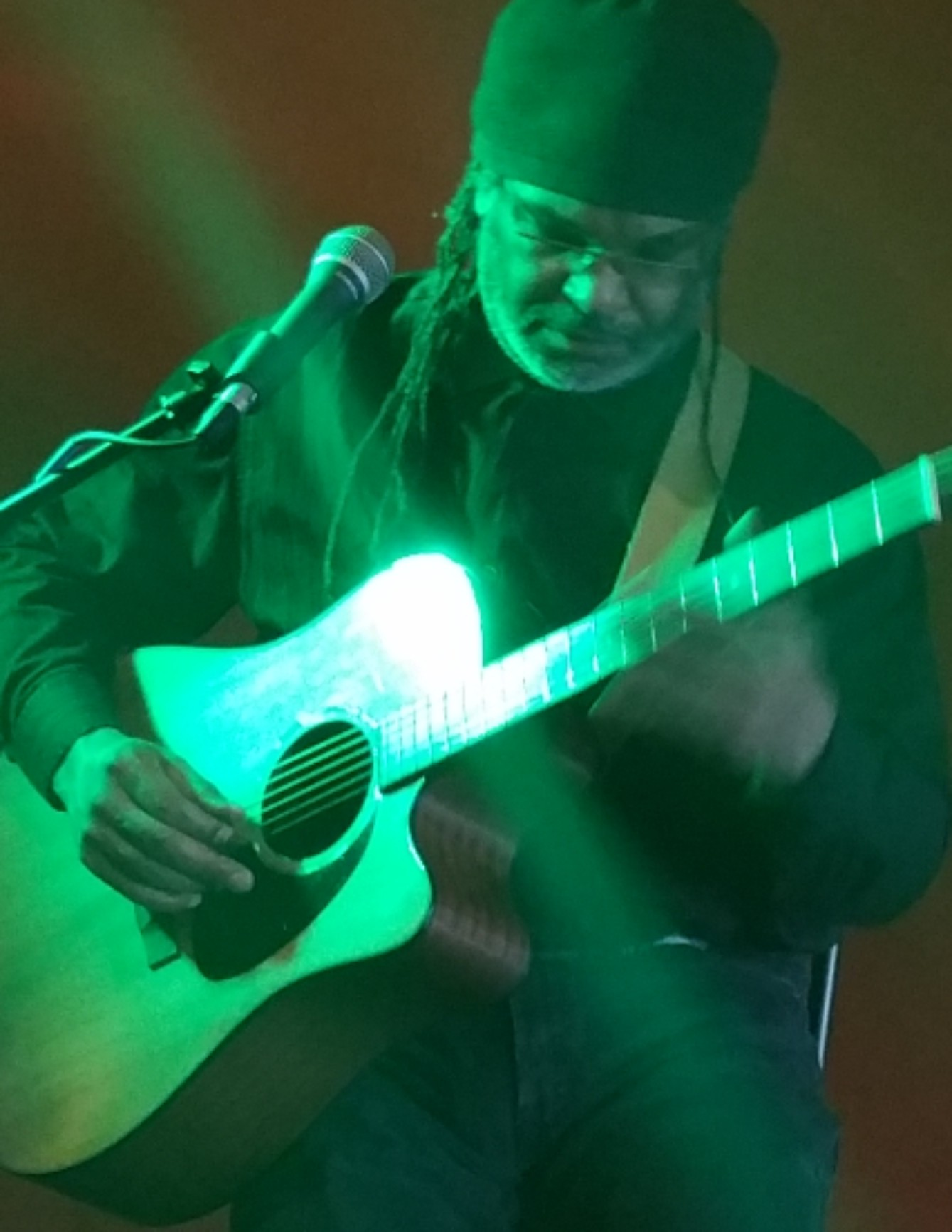
- Stann Champion

Background information
- Born: May 16, 1952; Pittsburgh, Pennsylvania, United States
- Died: August 16, 2022 (aged 70)
- Genres: Reggae World
- Instruments: Vocals, keyboards, drums, guitar, bass
- Years active: 1978–2022
- Labels: Sonic Sounds, Obvio Records, RRS International, VP Music
- Formerly of: Bob Marley, Earth Wind and Fire, Ziggy Marley, Al Jardine, Brett Michaels

Stann Champion (born Stanley Higgins; May 16, 1952 – August 16, 2022) was a Chicago-based American guitarist, singer, songwriter and producer. His music style incorporated reggae, calypso, R&B and, rock.

In 1986, Champion founded the band Roots Rock Society (RRS), which became a part of Chicago's Caribbean music scene. Throughout his career, he performed with Blue Öyster Cult, Quiet Riot, Gil Scott-Heron, Steel Pulse, Third World, Culture, and Burning Spear. Champion provided music therapy at hospitals and nursing homes.

He received twelve Chicago Music Awards, including "Best Calypso," "Best Soul Calypso," and "Best Gospel/Spiritual Band," as well as a "Lifetime Achievement Award" for his contributions to the Chicago music industry and community.

== Early life and education ==
Champion was born on May 16th, 1952 in Pittsburgh, Pennsylvania, and moved to Chicago, Illinois when he was young. He attended public K-12 schools and the Art Institute of Chicago Junior School before attending Southern Illinois University at Edwardsville (SIUE) and Columbia College Chicago, where he received his Bachelor of Arts in Graphic Design in 1974.

== Career ==
Before graduating from Columbia College Chicago, Champion worked in advertising agencies and played music. He collaborated with a songwriter from Saint Kitts on a recording session at Bob Marley's Tuff Gong Studio in Kingston. In 1982, as part of the band Gypsi-Fari, he recorded his first release, "The Girls," for Obvio Records at Paul Serrano Studios in Chicago.

After leaving Gypsi-Fari in 1982, Champion returned to the private sector and joined Carlene Davis's backing band for her North American tour. Champion later wrote two songs on Davis's EP.

In December 1986, Champion formed his own band, the Roots Rock Society (RRS). They toured with reggae bands such as Steel Pulse, Third World, Culture, Burning Spear, and Gil Scott-Heron. RRS's membership changed regularly, but the project continued. With RRS, Champion created his 'Tropical Roots' sound with the release of Again, a four-song EP co-produced by David Axelbaum, which reached over 250 radio stations worldwide.

== Stann Champion Radio Show ==
- WNUR Chicago's Sound Experiment 89.3 FM
- Stann Champion Show - Mondays +7:30 a.m. to 10:00 a.m. (Central)

== Discography ==
- Gypsi-Fari -- Hail Jah 45' (1981, Sonic Sounds)
- Stann Champion Roots Rock Society Cassette (1987 RRS International)
- Bass Mint Sessions Cassette (1991 RRS International)
- Again Cassette (1994 RRS International)
- Riddim to Riddim Cassette (2007 RRS International)
- La Familia Cassette (2010 RRS International)
- Cost of Living Cassette (2013 RRS International)
- TimeBless Cassette (2015 RRS International)
- Paradise Love Cassette (2016 VP Records)
- See Me Cassette (2016 VP Records)

== Awards and nominations ==
- 1980 'Playing for Peace Award,' Kingston, Jamaica
- 1982 "Best Band", Gypsi-Fari Chicago Music Awards (CMA)
- 1984 "Best New Band", Safari CMA
- 1985 "Best Band", Safari CMA
- 1989 "Most Versatile Band", Roots Rock Society (RRS)
- 1990 RRS Received Certificate of "Special Recognition" from Lucent Technologies
- 1993 RRS nominated "Best Roots and Reggae", Illinois Entertainer
- 1994 "Best Gospel/Spiritual Entertainer", RRS CMA
- 1995 "Best Gospel Entertainer", RRS CMA
- 1996 "Best Band", RRS CMA
- 1997 "Most Versatile Band", RRS CMA
- 2002 "Producers Award" for Stann Champion CMA
- 2002 "Best Reggae Album/CD" for "Riddim to Riddim" CMA
- 2007 RRS awarded "Best Entertainer" by CMA
- 2008 RRS awarded "Best Entertainer" by CMA
- 2015 Awarded Certificate of Appreciation for Community Leadership by Chatham Avalon Park Community Council
- 2016 Awarded "Gresham 6 Award" for community service by 6th District
- 2016 Awarded the "Lifetime Achievement Award"
- 2019 Elixir Strings Performing Artist Program
