= Roger H. Scherer =

American lawyer and politician (1935–2022)

Roger Henry Scherer (July 31, 1935 – August 14, 2022) was an American lawyer and politician.

Scherer was born in Minneapolis, Minnesota, and graduated from DeLasalle High School in Minneapolis. He served in the United States Army as a lieutenant with the military police. Scherer graduated from the College of Saint Benedict and Saint John's University and received his law degree from William Mitchell College of Law. He was admitted to the Minnesota bar. Scherer lived in Brooklyn Center, Minnesota with his wife and family. He practiced law and was involved with the lumber business. Scherer served in the Minnesota House of Representatives from 1967 to 1972. He died at his home on August 14, 2022, on Bass Lake, in Plymouth, Minnesota.
