= Joan Gould =

American author and journalist (1927–2022)

- Born: February 27, 1927; New York City, New York
- Died: 20 August 2022 (aged 95); Rye, New York
- Education: Bryn Mawr College
- Occupations: Journalist; Novelist
- Writing career
- Genre: Science fiction

Joan Gould (February 27, 1927 – August 20, 2022) was an American author and journalist. As a freelance journalist in the 1960s, Gould contributed articles to publications such as Esquire Life, Sports Illustrated, McCall's and The New York Times. She helped to plan and was the inaugural columnist of the Times' "Hers" column, for "intelligent, involved women".

Her first book, Otherborn (1980), was a science fiction novel for young adults. She has also published Spirals: A Woman's Journey Through Family Life (1988) and Spinning Straw into Gold: What Fairy Tales Reveal About the Transformations in a Woman's Life (2005).

== Writing ==
After attending Bryn Mawr College where she studied with W. H. Auden, she worked as a freelance journalist in the 1960s, contributing articles to a variety of publications. Most notably, she wrote about boat racing for Esquire.

In 1980, Gould wrote her first book, Otherborn, a science fiction novel for young adults. The book follows a shipwrecked brother and sister who are stranded on a Pacific Island inhabited by an unusual race of people.

In 1976, at a Manhattan party, Gould suggested the idea of a column for "intelligent, involved women" to A. M. Rosenthal, editor of The New York Times. With Gould's assistance, Rosenthal developed the New York Times' "Hers" column, "designed as a forum for writing by women." Gould became its first columnist.

Her pieces focus on the unique relational roles women play in the lives of their families and friends. She draws from her own experiences as a widow navigating the world without her longtime partner. An avid sailor, Gould also wrote about finding her sense of self on the open water: "For a while, a boat is more than a boat, and I am more than a blunderer. I am myself."

Gould chronicles her husband's illness and subsequent death from cancer in her 1988 book, Spirals: A Woman's Journey Through Family Life. Gould writes about her evolving roles and responsibilities as her husband dies and as her children grow up:

"What do I count for, after all, now that my daughter is a wife and a mother and a working woman besides, now that my son is a professional man and the equal of his father, who isn't a professional man any longer, while I'm without employment?"

Gould's travel writing has also been featured in the NY Times travel section. Some of her work was included in Katharine Lee Bates collection Spain: The Best Travel Writing from the New York Times (2001).

In 2005, Random House published Gould's feminist examination of cultural lore, Spinning Straw into Gold: What Fairy Tales Reveal About the Transformations in a Woman's Life.

"Fairy tales tell us that a day comes when we are due to wake up to a new reality, come to life again transformed... with a sense of wonder at how far we've come," she writes, "along with a twinge of nostalgia for the person we used to call 'me' but for whom we no longer have a name."

== Critical response ==
Gould's memoir, Spirals, received a rave review in The New York Times. The reviewer, Bob Greene, called the book "unlike anything I have ever read before," and praised its honest representation of life's banalities:

The real truths of our lives do not make the 6 o'clock news, and do not make the front page of the newspaper; life is far too important to permit that. Many people, including many journalists, don't understand this. Joan Gould does...

— Bob Greene

Spirals was selected a New York Times Editor's Choice the week of July 24, 1988.

== Personal life ==
After graduating, she married Martin Kleinbard, a lawyer. They were married for twenty-eight years, until his death from cancer in 1978. They had three children. Their marriage and family life serves as the inspiration for much of her writing.

Gould died in Rye, New York on August 20, 2022, aged 95.

== Select works ==
- "The Fastest, Smoothest Boat Yet," Esquire (February 1966)
- "An Aquarium for the People," Esquire (July 1966)
- "Nine Intrepid Men," Esquire (April 1, 1967)
- Otherborn (1980)
- Spirals: A Woman's Journey Through Family Life (1988)
- "Musings from the Underworld," New York Times, January 31, 1993
- "By Copter to the Wilds of Canada," New York Times, July 2, 1996
- Spinning Straw Into Gold: What Fairy Tales Reveal About the Transformations in a Woman's Life (2005)
