= Aldo Mirate =

Italian lawyer and politician (1943–2022)

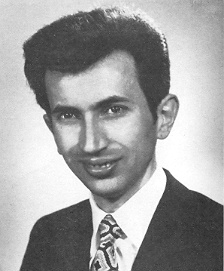

Member of the Chamber of Deputies of Italy
- In office 25 May 1972 – 19 June 1979

Personal details
- Born: 7 May 1943 Asti, Italy
- Died: 26 August 2022 (aged 79) Asti, Italy
- Party: PCI
- Occupation: Lawyer

Aldo Mirate (7 May 1943 – 26 August 2022) was an Italian politician. A member of the Italian Communist Party, he served in the Chamber of Deputies from 1972 to 1979.

Mirate died in Asti on 26 August 2022, at the age of 79.

== Biography ==
He earned a Liceo classico high school diploma and graduated with degrees in political science and law. After joining the Italian Communist Party, he served as a city councilor in Asti and later as a provincial councilor. Elected to the Chamber of Deputies, he combined his political career with his legal practice; in 1986, he was appointed by the Piedmont region to handle the case resulting from the methanol wine scandal. He died in his hometown, Asti, on August 26, 2022.
