= Trevor Baines =

British convicted criminal, formerly a businessman (1939–2022)

- Born: John Trevor Roche Baines; 19 December 1939; Formby, Lancashire, England
- Died: 1 August 2022 (aged 82); Douglas, Isle of Man
- Occupation: Businessman
- Criminal charges: Money laundering, false accounting and theft
- Criminal penalty: 8 1/2 years in total
- Spouse: Wendy Baines

John Trevor Roche Baines (19 December 1939 – 1 August 2022) was a British convicted criminal, formerly a businessman, who claimed to have amassed an estimated fortune of over £130 million, through banking, financial trading, and investment in the Miss World competition.

He was sentenced to six years imprisonment in November 2009 by a Manx Court, after it was determined that he was guilty of money laundering and false accounting. The laundering - the far more serious charge - alleged was that he and two others had administered a trust fund in excess of $100 million, which was acquired by others and independently of Baines as a result of a share push scam or a pump and dump fraud known as the AremisSoft fraud. The prosecution alleged that once the funds came to be managed by or through him, he knew of the provenance of the fund and administered it with that knowledge (the level of knowledge required for criminal liability is suspicion, though that suspicion has to be proven beyond reasonable doubt). He did not benefit directly from the fund itself but did receive payment by the fund for his administration of it. One of the two individuals, Roys Poyiadjis, responsible for the original scam was subsequently sentenced to a non-custodial term. The other remains at large.

In order to fund his defence and shortly before trial he was alleged, with his wife, to have expropriated and handled almost £1.3m. He and his wife pleaded guilty. He was sentenced to an additional term of 2 1/2 years imprisonment. Their advocate was also accused of complicity but, although convicted, the conviction was quashed on appeal.

== Death ==
He died at home in Douglas, Isle of Man on 1 August 2022, aged 82.
