= Nancy Hiller =

American cabinetmaker (1959–2022)

- Born: July 2, 1959; Miami Beach, Florida
- Died: August 29, 2022 (aged 63); Bloomington, Indiana
- Known for: Cabinetmaking, furniture making, restoration
- Style: Period and Arts & Crafts
- Website: http://www.nrhillerdesign.com/

Nancy Hiller (July 2, 1959 – August 29, 2022) was a cabinetmaker, period furniture maker, and author based in Bloomington, Indiana. Hiller owned and operated NR Hiller Design: Custom Furniture and Cabinetry, taught woodworking classes, and was the author of several books including Making Things Work: Tales from a Cabinetmaker's Life.

== Early life and education ==
Nancy Hiller was born on July 2, 1959, in Miami Beach, Florida to Herbert Hiller and Mary Lee Adler.

Hiller moved to England with her mother and sister in 1971 after her parents' divorce. She started building furniture out of necessity and for additional income while living as a young person in London in the late 1970s. Inspired to learn the craft, she earned a Certificate in Furniture Making from the City & Guilds of London in 1980. After graduation, she worked for Roy Giffiths building antique kitchens in Wisbech, Cambridgeshire. She went on to work briefly in the wood shop at the Imperial War Museum at Duxford Airbase outside of London.

Upon returning to the United States, she attended Indiana University, receiving a Bachelor of Arts degree in 1993 and a Master of Arts degree in 1996, both in Religious studies.

== Career ==
=== Woodworker ===
In 1995 Hiller founded NR Hiller Design, Inc. She was inspired by 19th- and 20th-century architecture and furniture, and specialized in restoration and period work. She enjoyed custom work on old houses and antique architecture. Her work has been featured in Popular Woodworking, Old-House Journal, and Fine Woodworking.

=== Educator ===
Hiller taught woodworking and cabinetmaking workshops at Kelly Mehler School of Woodworking in Berea, Kentucky, and Marc Adams School of Woodworking in Franklin, Indiana.

=== Author ===
Hiller wrote articles for journals including Fine Woodworking, Popular Woodworking, and Huffington Post. She authored the books English Arts and Crafts Furniture (2018), Making Things Work: Tales from a Cabinetmaker's Life (2017), Historic Preservation in Indiana: Essays from the Field (2013), A Home of Her Own (2011), and The Hoosier Cabinet in Kitchen History (2009).

== Publications ==
=== English Arts and Crafts Furniture: Projects & Techniques for the Modern Maker ===
Published in 2018, this book is an in-depth depiction of the furniture of the Arts and Crafts movement. This book includes historical lessons as well as drawings and photos to illustrate the traditional construction methods. Hiller describes the founding principles, the people such as William Morris and John Ruskin, and links the methods of construction to the philosophy of the movement.

=== Making Things Work: Tales from a Cabinetmaker's Life ===
First published in 2017, this book is a reflection of Hiller's decades-long career as a cabinet maker. This book is a series of short essays about making things from wood and about running a one-woman business in a traditionally male field.

== Death ==
Hiller died on August 29, 2022, of pancreatic cancer at her home in Bloomington, Indiana.
