= Edir Oliveira =

Brazilian politician (1950–2022)

Edir Pedro de Oliveira

Mayor of Gravataí
- In office 1 January 1993 – 1 January 1997
- Preceded by: José Mariano Garcia da Mota
- Succeeded by: Daniel Bordignon

Personal details
- Born: 3 February 1950; Rolante, Brazil
- Died: 4 August 2022 (aged 72); Gravataí, Brazil
- Political party: PTB

Edir Pedro de Oliveira (3 February 1950 – 4 August 2022) was a Brazilian politician. A member of the Brazilian Labour Party, he served as the mayor of Gravataí from 1993 to 1997.

Oliveira died of cardiac arrest in Gravataí on 4 August 2022, at the age of 72.
