= Katinka Mann =

American artist (1925–2022)

Katinka Mann (June 28, 1925 – August 22, 2022) was an American artist and sculptor. Mann was born in New York City on June 28, 1925. Her work is included in the collections of the Whitney Museum of American Art, the Smithsonian American Art Museum and the Museum of Modern Art, New York. Mann died on August 22, 2022, at the age of 97.
