= Joanna Clark =

University of Reading professor (1978–2022)

- Born: 1978
- Died: 4 August 2022 (aged 43–44)
- Education: University of Durham (BSc); King's College London (MSc); University of Leeds (PhD)
- Scientific career
- Fields: Environmental science
- Workplaces: University of Reading

Joanna Clark (1978 – 4 August 2022) was professor of environmental science at the University of Reading. She worked on aspects of carbon and water cycles in terrestrial and freshwater ecosystems from test-tube to catchment scale. She was founder and director of the Loddon Observatory, which aims to bring together academia, charities, public sector and business to support sustainable societies.

== Education and research career ==
Clark completed a BSc in geography at the University of Durham in 1999, followed by an MSc in monitoring, modelling and management of environmental change at King's College London in 2000. She earned a PhD in physical geography at the University of Leeds in 2005, before undertaking postdoctoral research associate positions at Leeds, Bangor and Imperial College London. She moved to the University of Reading in 2010.

=== Carbon and water cycle research ===
Clark's research focused on understanding the interactions between water, carbon, and other biogeochemical cycles within terrestrial and freshwater ecosystems. She had specific interests in peatland biogeochemistry. Clark used lab simulation experiments, field monitoring, modelling, and remote sensing. Her work on natural flood management employed land-based measures to reduce the risk of flooding for communities. Her collaborations with the water sector addressed issues related to the continued supply of clean water in the face of a growing population, ageing infrastructure, and the impacts of climate change. Clark also promoted the use of agroforestry to remove greenhouse gases from the atmosphere.
