= Roger Jouet =

French writer and historian (1944–2022)

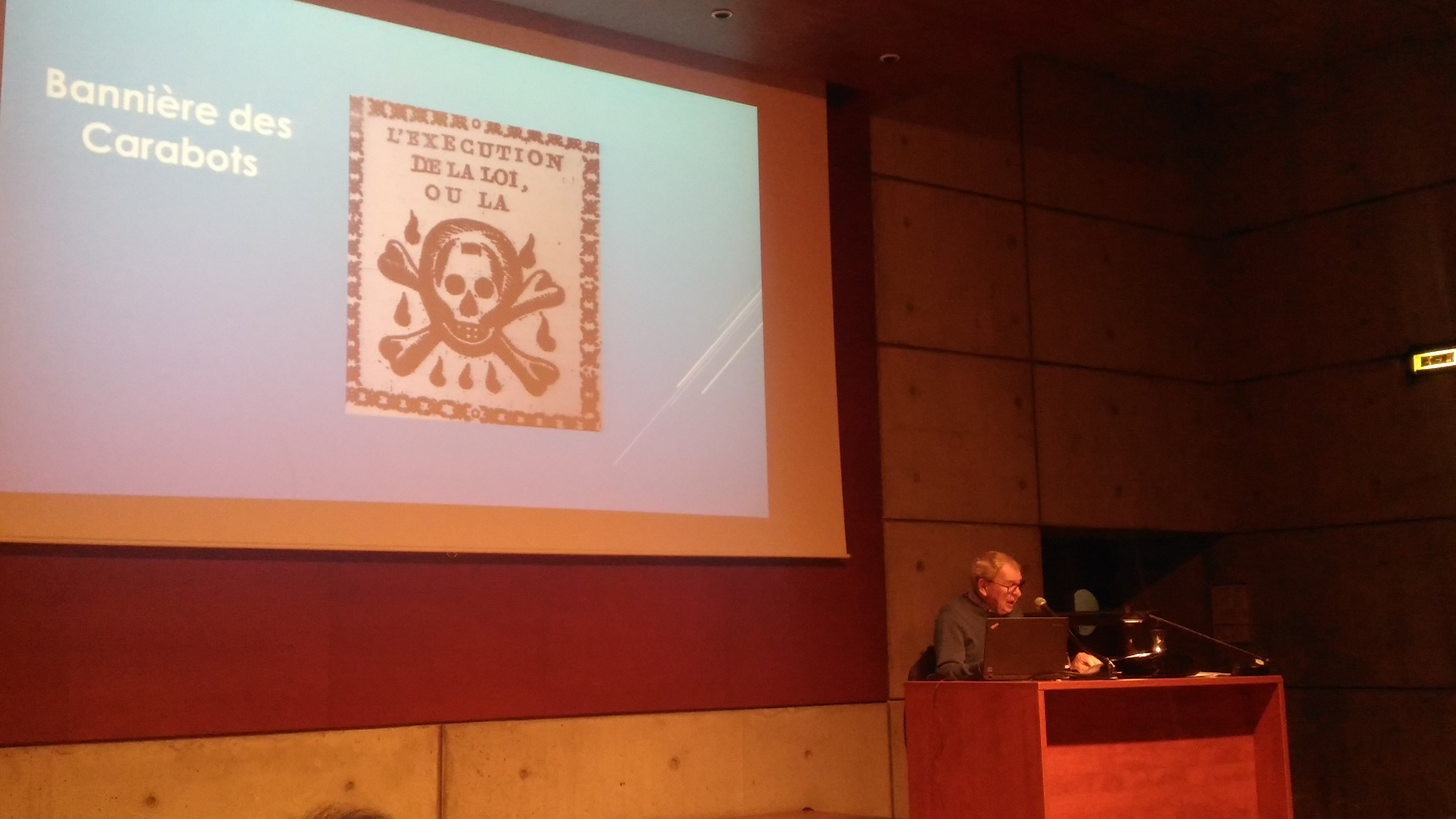

Member of the Regional Council of Lower Normandy
- In office 1986–1992
- President: René Garrec

Mayor of Trévières
- In office 1971–1994

Personal details
- Born: 15 September 1944; Saint-Georges-Montcocq, France
- Died: 25 August 2022 (aged 77); Caen, France
- Profession: Writer; Historian

Roger Jouet (15 September 1944 – 25 August 2022) was a French writer and historian.
