= Jonathan Destin =

French writer (1994–2022)

- Born: 9 December 1994; Lille, Nord, France
- Died: 20 August 2022 (aged 27); Marquette-lez-Lille, France
- Occupation: Writer
- Writing career
- Language: French
- Genre: Autobiography
- Notable works: Condamné à me tuer [Sentenced to Take My Own Life] The Day I Burned My Heart (film adaptation)

Jonathan Destin (9 December 1994 – 20 August 2022) was a French writer. A victim of harassment, he attempted suicide on 7 February 2011. He survived but suffered visible injuries, and later wrote about his torments.

== Biography ==
During his school years, Destin endured very severe school bullying for six years, from CM2 (a primary school grade for ages 10–11 in the French educational system) through secondary school. In February 2011 when he was 16 years old, bullies threatened him with a weapon and told him to bring 100 € (139.2 US dollars) to school for them. The next day, he attempted suicide by setting himself on fire. He then threw himself into the Deûle river. To treat the burns that covered 72% of his body, medical staff put him into an induced coma for three months. He went through twenty surgeries.

His book, Condamné à me tuer [Sentenced to Take My Own Life], written in collaboration with Marie-Thérèse Cuny, is an autobiography that traces the story that led to his suicide attempt.

On the occasion of the national day against bullying in November 2018, TF1 broadcast a TV movie called The Day I Burned My Heart, an adaptation of his book. Michaël Youn was part of the cast. The telefilm drew a record audience during its broadcast.

Destin's mother announced that her son died on 20 August 2022 in his sleep. As of 24 August 2022, the cause of death was unknown. There is an autopsy and a police investigation.

== Bibliography ==
- Destin, Jonathan (2013). Cuny, Marie-Thérèse (ed.). Condamné à me tuer [Sentenced to Take My Own Life] (in French). Paris: XO éd. ISBN 978-2-84563-646-0. OCLC 866825115.
