= Robert Deam Tobin =

American academic (1961–2022)

Robert Deam Tobin (1961 – 10 August 2022) was the Henry J Leir Chair in Literature, Language and Culture at Clark University in Worcester, Massachusetts, from 2008 to 2022. He was a leading scholar of German and European literature, culture, and sexuality studies. Tobin died of cancer in August 2022.

== Early life and education ==
Tobin was born in Urbana, Illinois, and raised in Eugene, Oregon. Following studies of German literature at Harvard College, where he received a B.A. in 1983, and Princeton, where he completed an M.A. and PhD. in 1987 and 1990, respectively, he joined the faculty of Whitman College in Walla Walla, Washington. At Whitman, he actively contributed to the German Studies program and various initiatives related to sexuality studies. While there, he was named the Cushing Eells Professor of the Humanities. In 2008, he gave Whitman College's commencement address. An eternal optimist, he told graduates "Our dark strivings will at times be obscurely motivated and incomprehensible to our loved ones. Even the good and beautiful things that we do will leave behind regrets. But as we leave ... I think we need to take the risk of hoping and believing that after such tragic storms there will be a rainbow and that rainbow will reflect the vast diversity of experiences that wait in store for us."

== Career ==
Tobin combined a rigorous research agenda with community-driven social justice initiatives. Between 2008 and 2022, Tobin served as the Henry J. Leir Chair in Foreign Languages and Cultures at Clark University. His courses focused on German literature, sexuality studies, and human rights. In his position, Tobin hosted a lecture series on queer studies, which featured internationally renowned scholars in the fields of European literary, cultural, and sexuality studies. Loved by students and colleagues alike, in recognition of his contribution to the intellectual community at his university, in 2019 Clark awarded him the Steinbacker Award. He was a member of the Strassler Center for Holocaust and Genocide Studies.

== Research ==
Tobin's scholarship on queer German studies ranged from literature to psychoanalysis, and from culture studies to the history of medicine. He published extensively on the writings of Johann Wolfgang von Goethe, Thomas Mann, and Sigmund Freud, with his research on these canonical figures funded by the German Academic Exchange Service (DAAD) and the National Endowment for the Humanities. In 2004-2005 Tobin was a Rockefeller Fellow in the Program for the Study of Sexuality, Gender, Health and Human Rights at Columbia University, and his research on German colonial history led him to archival research in Samoa and Namibia. In 2013, he held a guest professorship at the University of Vienna.

His first book, Warm Brothers: Queer Theory and the Age of Goethe (2000), relays a new history of German literature of the 18th and 19th centuries from the perspective of queer studies. Reviewed in prominent journals in German and European studies, the book was hailed as a vital study in the field of queer German studies.

In Peripheral Desires: The German Discovery of Sex (2015), Tobin charts the emergence of language to describe non-normative sexuality in the writing of German literary authors and intellectuals in the century spanning 1830 to 1930. The Times Literary Supplement deemed the book "brilliantly argued, beautifully written and highly erudite."

In 2019, Tobin gave an invited lecture at Berlin's Schwules Museum (gay museum) on the theme of "Jews, Germans, and Same-Sex Desire" in the 19th century. He was the 2013 Fulbright-Freud Visiting Lecturer of Psychoanalysis, which is sponsored by the Sigmund Freud Foundation and the Austrian Fulbright Commission.

Tobin's research interest in cultural history and diversity led him to write about the Eurovision song contest as a place where Europeans negotiated the boundaries of tolerance. In recent years, he took up the theme of illiberalism, the alt right, and male-male desire.

== Public History ==
In addition to his scholarly work, Tobin was part of the curatorial team that put together the Worcester County LGBTQ+ History Project. This was a partnership between the Worcester Historical Museum (WHM), Digital Worcester, Clark University, the College of the Holy Cross, and Worcester Polytechnic Institute. On January 26, 2020, Tobin received the key to the city of Worcester in recognition of his collaboration with Joseph F. Cullon and Stephanie E. Yuhl on the Worcester Historical Museum exhibit. It was the first of its kind to celebrate the long history of LGBTQ+ people in Worcester. The exhibit findings are collected in a book with the same name as the exhibit Tobin authored with his collaborators.

He was committed to public engagement, writing about how gay rights were human rights in honor of Human Rights Day in 2011. He gave a guest appearance on WXLO-FM, bringing his research to the public.

== Publications ==
=== Books ===
- Peripheral Desires: The German Discovery of Sex. University of Pennsylvania Press, 2015. ISBN 978-0-8122-4742-8
- Doctor's Orders: Goethe and Enlightenment Thought Lewisburg, PA: Bucknell University Press, 2001. ISBN 0-8387-5466-X
- Warm Brothers: Queer Theory and the Age of Goethe Philadelphia: University of Pennsylvania Press, 2000. ISBN 978-0-8122-3544-9

=== Edited Book ===
- with Ivan Raykoff, A Song for Europe: Popular Music and Politics in the Eurovision Song Contest. New York: Routledge, 2007. ISBN 978-0-7546-5879-5
