= Ronald J. Glasser =

American doctor and author (1939–2022)

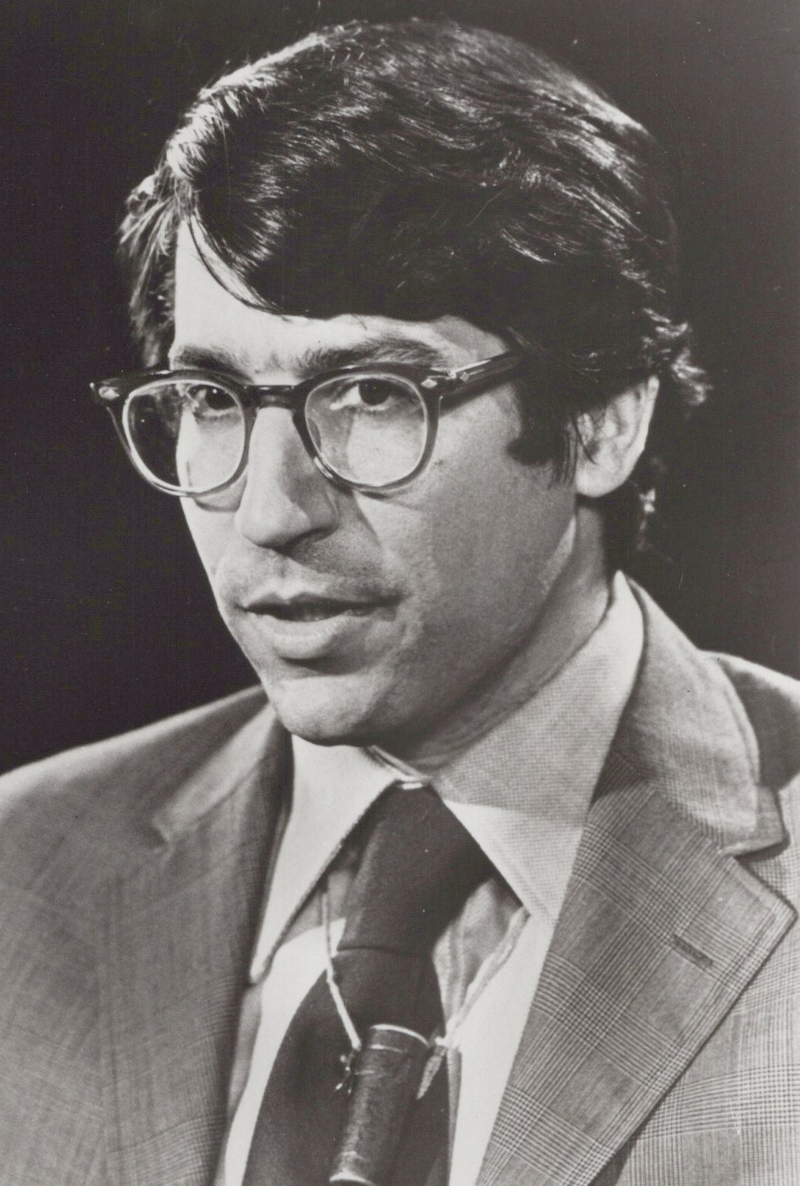
Glasser in 1973

Ronald Joel Glasser (May 31, 1939 – August 26, 2022) was an American doctor and author, best known for his book 365 Days, chronicling his tour of duty as a US Army doctor during the Vietnam War. He was born in Chicago, Illinois.

Published in 1971, the book became a best-seller. It was reviewed in the Washington Monthly and the New York Times. 365 Days has been translated into nine languages.

In June 2006, Glasser, a Minneapolis physician, published his seventh book, Wounded: Vietnam to Iraq. In his foreword, Glasser writes:

These stories are true. I was part of some of them; the rest belonged to others. What was so troubling was not what I saw or heard, but that it all kept happening again and again... As for me, none of this was written out of pique or anger, but to give those caught up in this terrible enterprise something all their own, something they could give to others and say, "this is what happened."

Glasser died at the age of 83 on August 26, 2022, in St. Louis Park, Minnesota, from complications of dementia.

== Works ==
- 365 Days (1971). G. Braziller. ISBN 0-8076-0615-4.
- Wounded: Vietnam to Iraq (2006). G. Braziller. ISBN 0-8076-1571-4.
- Ward 402 (1973) G. Braziller. ISBN 0-671-80389-1.
- Broken Bodies Shattered Minds: A Medical Odyssey From Vietnam to Afghanistan (2011). History Publishing.
- The Body Is the Hero (1976). Bantam Books.
- Another War, Another Peace (1985). Summit Books.
- The Greatest Battle (1976). Random House.
- The Light In the Skull: An Odyssey of Medical Discovery (1997). Faber & Faber.
