= Stephen Glasser =

American publisher (1943–2022)

Stephen Glasser (July 27, 1943 – August 25, 2022) was an American publisher who founded the Legal Times.

== Biography ==
Stephen Glasser was born on July 27, 1943 in Memphis, Tennessee. He attended and graduated with a bachelor's degree in political science from Colgate University in 1965. Later, in the same year, he married Lynn Schreiber. In 1968, he graduated with a law degree from the University of Michigan Law School.

After his graduation, he briefly worked for United States Department of Labor before joining the New York Law Journal.

In 1978, Glasser started a weekly newspaper, Legal Times, with his wife.

In 1995, he founded Glasser LegalWorks which was acquired by FindLaw in 2003.

A resident of Montclair, New Jersey, Glasser died on August 25, 2022, at NewYork-Presbyterian Hospital.
