= Juan Antonio Arévalo =

Spanish politician (1935–2022)

Member of the Senate of Spain
- In office 1979–2000

Personal details
- Born: 2 June 1935
- Died: 2 August 2022 (aged 87)
- Political party: PSOE

Juan Antonio Arévalo (2 June 1935 – 2 August 2022) was a Spanish politician. He served as a member of the Senate of Spain from 1979 to 2000.

Arévalo was a promoter of the bullfighting law in 1991. He died on 2 August 2022, at the age of 87.
