= Kenneth Foulkes =

English rugby league footballer (1944–2022)

Personal information
- Born: first ¼ 1944; Pontefract district, England
- Died: August 2022 (aged 78)

Playing information
Club
Years	Team	Pld	T	G	FG	P
1962–65	Castleford	15	6	0	0	18
1964–78	Hull FC
	Total	15	6	0	0	18

Coaching information
Club
Years	Team	Gms	W	D	L	W%
1985–86	Hull FC

Kenneth Foulkes (birth registered first ¼ 1944 – August 2022) was an English professional rugby league footballer who played in the 1960s. He played at club level for Castleford, and Hull FC.

== Playing career ==
=== County League appearances ===
Kenneth Foulkes played in Castleford's victory in the Yorkshire League during the 1964–65 season.

== Personal life and death ==
Kenneth Foulkes' birth was registered in Pontefract district, West Riding of Yorkshire, England. He died in August 2022, at the age of 78.
