= Harland Whitmore =

American economist (1939–2022)

Harland William Whitmore (October 14, 1939 – August 15, 2022) was an American economist. An emeritus professor of economics, he formerly worked at the University of Cincinnati. He published several books related to the economy and the world. He also consulted and worked with the United States Environmental Protection Agency on the integration of the macroeconomy with ecological systems. Harland earned a bachelor's in mathematics from Lawrence University, a master of business administration, and a PhD in economics from Michigan State University.

Harland Whitmore died on August 15, 2022, at the age of 82. He was the son of Harland William Whitmore Sr. who holds multiple patents in refrigeration assembly.

== Books ==
- The world economy, population growth, and the global ecosystem : a unified theoretical model of interdependent dynamic systems New York, NY : Palgrave Macmillan, 2007.
- World economy macroeconomics Armonk, N.Y. : M.E. Sharpe, ©1997.
- Global environmental macroeconomics Armonk, N.Y. : M.E. Sharpe, ©1999.
- Aggregate Economic Choice. Berlin: Springer-Verlag, 1986.
