= Bernice Lott =

American social psychologist (1930–2022)

- Occupations: Professor of Psychology and Woman's Studies
- Spouse: Albert J. Lott
- Awards: Honorary Doctor of Humane Letters, University of Rhode Island (1999); APA Gold Medal Award for Life Achievement in Psychology in the Public Interest (2011)

Academic background
- Education: University of California, Los Angeles

Bernice Lott (March 31, 1930 – August 14, 2022) was an American social psychologist known for her work on feminist psychology, gender, poverty, social class, and prejudice and discrimination. She was Professor Emerita of Psychology and Woman's Studies at the University of Rhode Island and was a former Dean of its University College.

Lott served as President of the Society for the Psychology of Women, American Psychological Association (APA) Division 35 from 1990 to 1991.

== Awards ==
Lott presented the APA Carolyn Wood Sherif Award lecture in 1997 in which she discussed what are widely held beliefs about differences between women and men and why such beliefs are problematic.

In 2011 Lott received the American Psychological Association Gold Medal Award for Life Achievement in Psychology in the Public Interest. Her award citation emphasized that her "leadership on issues of economic injustice paved the way for attention to little-explored dimensions of psychology’s social justice agenda: classism and poverty. She was a catalyst for APA initiatives such as the Resolution on Poverty and Socioeconomic Status, and she was instrumental in the establishment of APA’s Committee on Socioeconomic Status."

The University of Rhode Island awarded her an honorary Doctor of Humane Letters degree in 1999.

== Biography ==
Bernice Lott was born on March 31, 1930, in Brooklyn, New York. Her parents were Eastern European Jewish immigrants who had experienced the hardships of being immigrants. Lott grew up in a working-class family as the youngest of three daughters. Lott's upbringing in Brooklyn sparked her interest in social issues and social justice, and as a student, she was politically active, joining a variety of student groups that addressed social issues. When Lott was only 16, she enrolled at Brooklyn College. At age 19, Lott married a fellow psychology student at Brooklyn College, and subsequently transferred to the University of California, Los Angeles (UCLA) to finish her degree. Lott received her Bachelor of Science degree from UCLA in 1950. She then entered the graduate program and earned her PhD in Experimental/Social Psychology in 1953.

Lott had teaching positions at various institutions, including the University of Colorado and Kentucky State University, before moving to the University of Rhode Island in 1970. Finally, in 1977, 24 years after receiving her doctorate, she obtained a tenure-track faculty position in psychology. Lott was visiting scholar at Brown University’s Center for Research and Teaching on Women, Stanford University’s Institute for Research on Women and Gender, the University of Waikato, New Zealand, and the University of Hawaii at Manoa.

Lott died on August 14, 2022, at the age of 92.

== Research ==
Lott's research focuses on multiculturalism, economic injustice, interpersonal discrimination. She was interested in the kinds of attitudes people have towards one another, in prejudice, and in war and peace.

Lott demonstrated, experimentally, how young children can learn to prefer one color to others through the process of mediated generalization. To learn a color preference seemed very much like the formation of an attitude, and it was the learning of social attitudes relevant to people, and their consequences for behavior, that was her primary interest. She was particularly interested in what men did in the presence of women (i.e., in discriminatory behavior) instead of in what they said they felt (affect or attitudes) or in what they said they believed (cognitions or stereotypes). She proposed a social psychological model of interpersonal sexism in which prejudice, stereotypes, and discrimination are conceptually and operationally distinguished.

Lott wrote many books and articles that focused around the study of culture and ethnicity, gender psychology, prejudice and stereotyping, etc. In her book, Women’s Lives: Themes and Variations in Gender Learning, she considers these issues and explores the common themes and variations in gender learning. Her book, Multiculturalism and Diversity: A Social Psychological Perspective, develops the thesis that social class, ethnicity, gender, and sexual identity are cultures (among others) in which individuals are located within a broad multicultural mosaic. She argues that each cultural identity exerts an influence on behavior to an extent that varies with its strength or dominance, context, situation, place, time, and expected consequences.

== Books ==
- Chin, J. L., Lott, B., Rice, J., & Sanchez-Hucles, J. (Eds.). (2008). Women and leadership: Transforming visions and diverse voices. John Wiley & Sons.
- Lott, B. E. (1981). Becoming a woman: The socialization of gender. Charles C. Thomas Publisher.
- Lott, B. (1987). Women's lives: Themes and variations in gender learning. Thomson Brooks/Cole Publishing Co.
- Lott, B. (2009). Multiculturalism and diversity: A social psychological perspective (Vol. 3). John Wiley & Sons.
- Lott, B., & Bullock, H. E. (2007). Psychology and economic injustice: Personal, professional, and political intersections. American Psychological Association.
