= Vahan Chamlian =

Armenian businessman (1926–2022)

Vahan Chamlian (Armenian: Վահան Շամլեան, 1926 – August 11, 2022), was an American-Armenian philanthropist and businessman, and the world's largest dealer of secondhand clothes.

== Life and career ==
Of Armenian descent, Vahan Chamlian emigrated from Lebanon to the United States in 1957, arriving in the United States with just $20 in his pocket. He eventually founded the company Chamlian Enterprises Inc., which became the world's largest dealer in secondhand clothes. The company employs eight hundred workers in its Los Angeles, Fresno and San Lorenzo locations; he has also opened a factory in Germany. By 1996, Chamlian owned three sorting plants which grossed $78.6 million from the recycling and exporting of used clothing. Some of Chamlian's suppliers include Salvation Army and Goodwill. The largest demand for Chamlian's used clothing comes from Third World countries, in particular West African countries. John, the nephew of Vahan Chamlian, who manages the operations in Los Angeles states the attention to detail is what "makes them the best".

Vahan Chamlian married Anoush, who is also a philanthropist.

He and his wife resided in Fresno, California.

== Legacy and philanthropy ==
In 1975, Vahan Chamlian along with his wife Anoush raised funds to pay for all expenses for the establishment of an Armenian private school in Glendale, California. The name of the school became Vahan & Anoush Chamlian. The school, located on Lowell Avenue, continues to function till this day. Vahan Chamlian is noted to have taken "pride" in its establishment.

He was a major contributor to the Armenia Fund, donating as much as $500,000 at a time.

He was a donator of funds for the publication of Armenian related books.

Chamlian met the former president of Armenia, Levon Ter-Petrosyan and Karekin II, Catholicos of All Armenians.
