= Liu Shunsong =

Taiwanese politician (1952–2022)

Member of the Miaoli County Council
- In office 10 May 2014 – 30 August 2022

Personal details
- Born: 1 December 1952 Miaoli County, Taiwan
- Died: 30 August 2022 (aged 69) Taipei, Taiwan
- Party: Democratic Progressive Party

Liu Shunsong (Chinese: 劉順松; 1 December 1952 – 30 August 2022) was a Taiwanese politician.

== Biography ==
He was a member of the Miaoli County Council from 2014 until his death in 2022, representing the Democratic Progressive Party. Liu died due to COVID-19 at the Taipei Veterans General Hospital, on 30 August 2022, at the age of 69.
