= Ann McGuiness =

American reproductive rights advocate (1957–2022)

- Born: 27 July 1957; New Britain, USA
- Died: 3 August 2022 (aged 65); Albany, New York, USA
- Education: University of Saint Joseph (Connecticut) West Hartford, CT
- Occupations: Reproductive and sexual health rights advocate and fundraiser
- Years active: 1986–2022
- Known for: Director of Development NARAL Pro-Choice America, political advocacy at Planned Parenthood

Ann McGuiness (27 July 1957 – 3 August 2022) was an American reproductive rights advocate. She worked with NARAL Pro-Choice America for 20 years from 1986 to 2006, a specialist in fundraising and political advocacy. She worked with Planned Parenthood from 2006 until 2018.

== Early life and education ==
Ann McGuiness was born in New Britain, Connecticut, USA into an Irish-Catholic family. Herfather was steamfitter Edward McGuiness and her mother Catherine a public schoolteacher. She had two brothers Patrick and Timothy, and one sister, Mary Kate. She studied political science at the University of Saint Joseph (Connecticut) in West Hartford, and graduated in 1979. At Columbia University in New York she earned a master's degree in public administration in 1984.

== Career ==
In 1986 she moved to Washington, D.C., and worked for Timothy Wirth's campaign for the US Senate. She then joined NARAL Pro-Choice America. From 2006 until 2018, McGuiness worked for Planned Parenthood. In 2020 she founded the Contraceptive Access Initiative. She also furthered organizations such as Families USA, International Women's Health Coalition, the National Family Planning and Reproductive Health Association, and Rewire News Group.

== Personal life ==
McGuiness was married to William Reynolds, and had a daughter, Nora McGuiness Reynolds, and a son, Nicholas McGuiness Reynolds. In 2000, a career shift brought the family to the Albany, New York, area. She practiced backcountry skiing in Canadian wilderness areas, and sailed on the Chesapeake Bay and the Gulf of Mexico. In August 2022, McGuiness died of leiomyosarcoma of the lungs.
