= Randall B. Campbell =

American historian

Randolph B. Campbell (November 16, 1940–August 13, 2022) was an American historian.

== Early life ==
Randolph B. Campbell was born on November 16, 1940, in Charlottesville, Virginia, the son of John Landon and Virginia Lyon Campbell. He had no siblings.

== Career ==
In 1963, while completing his doctoral work at the University of Virginia, Campbell accepted a position at the Virginia Polytechnic Institute. He earned his PhD in 1966, and began a long career as a historian at the University of North Texas. Campbell assumed leadership positions in the Texas State Historical Association (TSHA). He was their president in 1993 and 1994. TSHA selected Campbell as its first Chief Historian in 2008, a role which he served though 2017. The TSHA publications under Campbell's management as Chief Historian included the Southwestern Historical Quarterly and the Handbook of Texas. In addition to supervising the Handbook of Texas, he edited numerous entries and composed many new ones.

== Personal life ==
Campbell was married to Diana Snow. They had two sons, James Landon and Jonathan Clay Campbell.

== Death and legacy ==
Campbell died on August 13, 2022. Survivors included two sons and three grandchildren.

== Publications ==
- Campbell, Randolph B. (1989). An Empire for Slavery: The Peculiar Institution in Texas, 1821–1865. Baton Rouge: Louisiana State University Press. ISBN 978-0-8071-1723-1.
