= Duro Onabule =

Nigerian journalist (1939–2022)

Duro Onabule (27 September 1939 – 16 August 2022) was a Nigerian journalist, who was an editor of the National Concord from 1984 to 1985, and later became Chief Press Secretary to President Ibrahim Babangida.

Onabule was presidential spokesman for most of the Babangida administration when government punished newspaper and magazine publishers with temporary proscription to make them conform to the code of conduct set up by the administration.

== Life and career ==
Onabule was born on 27 September 1939 in Ijebu-Ode, he graduated from the CMS Grammar School and the School of Journalism, London. His first media work was a reporter for the Daily Express in 1961; three years later, he joined the staff of the Daily Sketch. He spent some time with the Daily Sketch before going back to his previous employer, the Daily Express. In 1969, he served as the London correspondent for the Daily Express. In the mid 1970s, he worked for the Daily Times, rising to become a deputy editor of the Headlines magazine. When MKO Abiola started the Concord Press, Onabule was appointed features editor, in 1984, he became the editor of the National Concord.

Onabule died on 16 August 2022, at the age of 82.
