= Edmund Hein =

German economist and politician (1940–2022)

Member of the Landtag of Saarland
- In office 1970–1994

Personal details
- Born: 13 August 1940 Nalbach, Rhine Province, Prussia, Germany
- Died: 19 August 2022 (aged 82)
- Party: CDU
- Education: Saarland University
- Occupation: Economist

Edmund Hein (13 August 1940 – 19 August 2022) was a German economist and politician. A member of the Christian Democratic Union of Germany, he served in the Landtag of Saarland from 1970 to 1994.

Hein died on 19 August 2022, at the age of 82.
