= Lee Gi-ho =

South Korean politician (1945–2022)

Minister of Labor
- In office 5 August 1997 – 25 May 1999
- Preceded by: Jin Nyum
- Succeeded by: Lee Sang-ryong

Chief Executive of the Office of Administrative Coordination
- In office 7 March 1997 – 5 August 1997
- Preceded by: Lee Hwan-myeon
- Succeeded by: Lee Young-tak

Personal details
- Born: 1 October 1945
- Died: 3 August 2022 (aged 76)
- Education: Seoul National University; Boston University

Lee Gi-ho (Korean: 이기호; 1 October 1945 – 3 August 2022) was a South Korean politician. He served as Minister of Labor from 1997 to 1999.

Lee died on 3 August 2022, at the age of 76.
