= Tycho Q. Mrsich =

German scholar of Ancient Egyptian law (1925–2022)

Tycho Quirinus Mrsich (15 September 1925 – 22 August 2022) was a German scholar of Ancient Egyptian law.

Mrsich received his Dr. phil. degree in Egyptology from LMU Munich in 1966 with a dissertation on the ancient Egyptian legal term imyt-pr (translated as Hausurkunde in German or often “Testament” in English).

From the late 1960s, he was post-doctoral assistant, academic advisor, and then Academic Director at the Leopold Wenger Institute for Ancient Legal History and Papyrus Research at LMU Munich where he also taught (and continued to teach in retirement) courses on Demotic and Ancient Egyptian legal sources as well as Egyptian.

Mrsich wrote several important works on Ancient Egyptian law. His Untersuchungen zur Hausurkunde des alten Reiches: Ein Beitrag zum altägyptischen Stiftungsrecht (a revision of his doctoral dissertation) examined the ancient Egyptian legal term imyt-pr. He followed this with his article “Gehört die Hausurkunde (ı͗myt-pr) in den Pyramidentexten zum sakaralen Recht?” in Studien zur Altägyptischen Kultur 2 (1975), pp. 189–212. A series of articles delved deeper into technical issues of ancient Egyptian law (in both hieroglyphic and demotic sources). When he began to write a book review on Heinz Felber's Demotische Ackerpachtverträge der Ptolemäerzeit: Untersuchungen zu Aufbau, Entwicklung und inhaltlichen Aspekten einer Gruppe von demotischen Urkunden (Wiesbaden: Harrassowitz, 1997), it grew so long that he published it in 2003 as a book entitled Rechtsgeschichtliches zur Ackerverpachtung auf Tempelland nach demotischem Formular. Recently, Mrsich has delved into large-scale analysis of the ancient legal system of Egypt in his Fragen zum altägyptischen Recht der "Isolationsperiode" vor dem Neuen Reich: ein Forschungsbericht aus dem Arbeitskreis "Historiogenese von Rechtsnormen” (Munich: Utz, 2005) and his Zum rechtssystematischen Anfang in Ägypten: eine Methodenkunde, vol. I (Munich: Utz, 2018).

His attention to detail in both reading ancient texts and modern scholarly arguments has been praised by scholars.

Mrsich died on 22 August 2022, at the age of 96.

== Selected publications ==
- Untersuchungen zur Hausurkunde des alten Reiches: Ein Beitrag zum altägyptischen Stiftungsrecht Münchner ägyptologische Studien vol. 13 (Berlin: Hessling, 1968)
- “Ein Beitrag zum "hieroglyphischen Denken, Studien zur Altägyptischen Kultur 6 (1978), pp. 107-129
- “Eine Zwischenbilanz zum "zivilprozessualen" Abschnitt des demotischen Rechtsbuches "S" (P.Berl. 13621 Rc.Col.II),” in D. Noerr and D. Simon, eds., Gedächtnisschrift für Wolfgang Kunkel (Frankfurt: V. Klostermann, 1984), pp. 205-282
- Rechtsgeschichtliches zur Ackerverpachtung auf Tempelland nach demotischem Formular, Sitzungsberichte / Österreichische Akademie der Wissenschaften, Philosophisch-Historische Klasse; Vol. 703; Veröffentlichungen der Kommission für Antike Rechtsgeschichte / Österreichische Akademie der Wissenschaften; vol. 10 (Vienna: Austrian Academy of Science, 2003)
- Fragen zum altägyptischen Recht der "Isolationsperiode" vor dem Neuen Reich: ein Forschungsbericht aus dem Arbeitskreis "Historiogenese von Rechtsnormen” (Munich: Utz, 2005)
- “Methodisches zur altägyptischen Rechtsgeschichte,” Zeitschrift der Savigny-Stiftung (Rom. Abt.) 130 (2013), pp. 507-526
- “Methodisches zur altägyptischen Rechtsgeschichte. Zweiter Teil,” Zeitschrift der Savigny-Stiftung (Rom. Abt.) 131 (2014), pp. 349-369
- Zum rechtssystematischen Anfang in Ägypten: eine Methodenkunde, vol. I (Munich: Utz, 2018)
- Rechtsgeschäftliches Denken in der Frühkultur Ägyptens, vol. II (München: Utz, 2020)
