= Shigeaki Kato (politician) =

Japanese politician (1947–2022)

- 加藤 繁秋

Member of the House of Representatives
- In office 18 February 1990 – 18 June 1993
- Preceded by: Shigeaki Tsukihara
- Succeeded by: Shigeaki Tsukihara
- Constituency: Kagawa 2nd

Personal details
- Born: 11 June 1947 Kagawa Prefecture, Japan
- Died: 17 August 2022 (aged 75)
- Party: Socialist (before 1996)
- Other political affiliations: SDP (after 1996)
- Education: Kagawa Prefectural Marugame High School

Shigeaki Kato (Japanese: 加藤繁秋 Katō Shigeaki; 11 June 1947 – 17 August 2022) was a Japanese politician. A member of the Japan Socialist Party, he served in the House of Representatives representing the 2nd District of Kagawa prefecture from 1990 to 1993.

Kato died on 17 August 2022, at the age of 75.
