= Karl Lamers =

German politician (1935–2022)

Member of the Bundestag; from North Rhine-Westphalia
- In office 4 November 1980 – 17 October 2002
- Constituency: State list

Personal details
- Born: 11 November 1935 Königswinter, Germany
- Died: 27 August 2022 (aged 86)
- Party: Christian Democratic Union
- Children: 1
- Education: Aloisiuskolleg; University of Bonn; University of Cologne

Karl Lamers (11 November 1935 – 27 August 2022) was a German politician of the Christian Democratic Union (CDU) and member of the German Bundestag.

== Life ==
Lamers joined the CDU in 1955. From 1968 to 1971 he was state chairman of the Junge Union in the Rhineland. From 1971 he was a member of the North Rhine-Westphalia CDU state executive committee, from 1975 to 1981 as deputy state chairman. From 1986 to 2005 he was chairman of the CDU's Central Rhine District Association.

From 1990 to 2002, Lamers was foreign policy spokesman for the CDU parliamentary group and chairman of the Foreign Affairs Committee.
