= Gar Baxter =

Canadian football player (1930–2022)

Joseph Garth Baxter
Profile
- Position: Centre

Personal information
- Born: 16 February 1930; Winnipeg, Manitoba, Canada
- Died: 15 August 2022 (aged 92); Surrey, British Columbia, Canada
- Listed height: 6 ft 2 in (1.88 m)
- Listed weight: 210 lb (95 kg)

Career history
- 1951–1954: Winnipeg Blue Bombers

Gar Baxter (16 February 1930 – 15 August 2022) was a Canadian professional football player who played for the Winnipeg Blue Bombers. He previously played for the Winnipeg Rods.

In 1956, he left the Blue Bombers after missing a season due to an injury.

Baxter died on 15 August 2022, aged 92.
