= Stefan Arczyński =

Polish photographer (1916–2022)

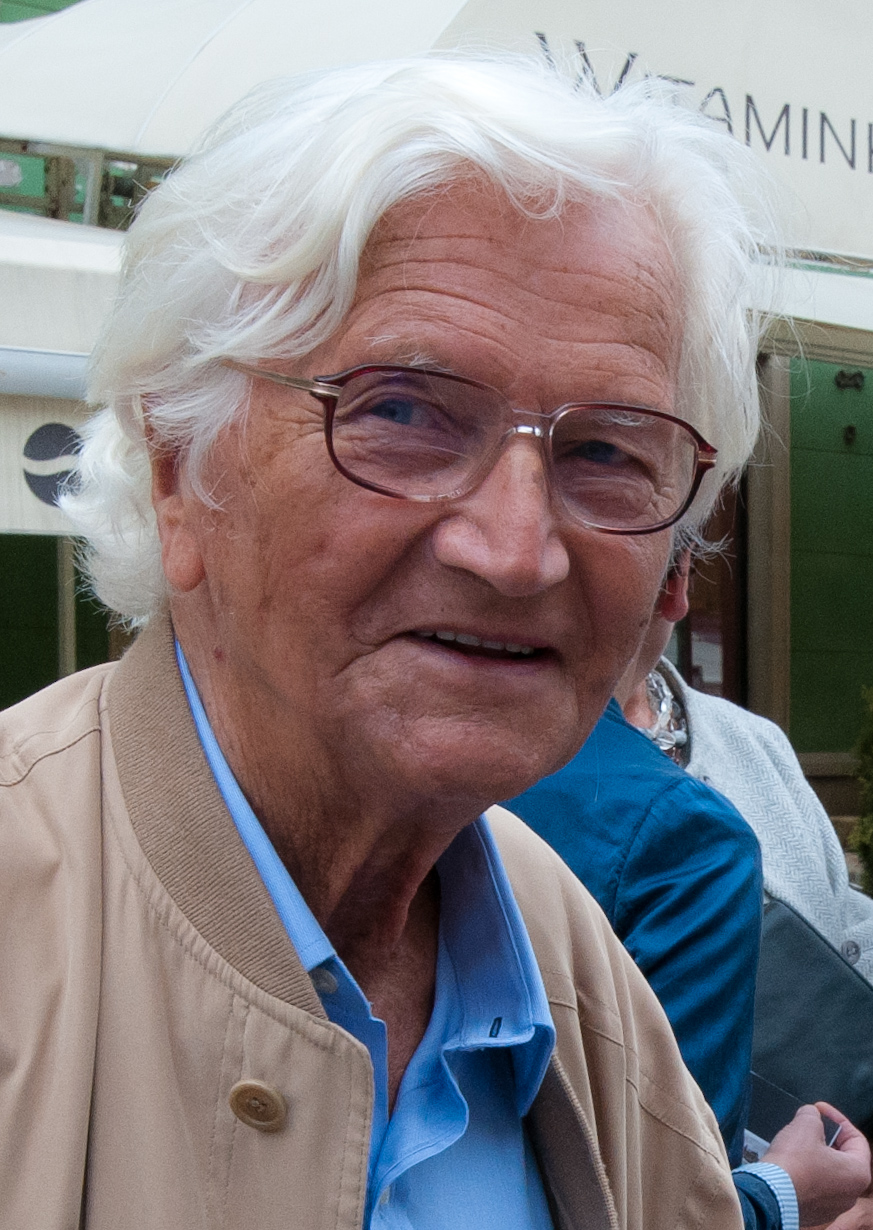
- Arczyński in 2011
- Born: 31 July 1916; Essen, Rhine Province, Kingdom of Prussia, German Empire (now in North Rhine-Westphalia, Germany)
- Died: 28 August 2022 (aged 106); Wroclaw, Poland
- Known for: Photography

Stefan Arczyński (31 July 1916 – 28 August 2022) was a Polish photographer and veteran of World War II. He worked in Essen, Berlin, and Wrocław.

Born in Germany on 31 July 1916 to a family of immigrants from Greater Poland, he was interested in photography in his youth, in particular sports photography. After World War II, he went to France and worked on the development of aerial photography. He took pictures for magazine covers and for postcards; he also photographed art. For many years, he collaborated with director Henryk Tomaszewski. He travelled extensively and, in addition to photos from various regions of Poland, he also photographed in numerous countries around the world, including China, India, Africa, and the United States.

After the outbreak of World War II, he was drafted into the Luftwaffe and sent to France; there he was involved in the development of aerial photography. Later transferred to the infantry, he was sent to the Eastern Front in Ukraine. There, too, he did not part with his camera and photographed during the war with the USSR. Wounded at Stalingrad, he was taken to a field hospital and, after recovery, captured in Latvia. His father's activity in the Union of Poles in Germany helped secure his release.

Arczyński died on 28 August 2022, at the age of 106.

== Awards and honors ==
- Gold Cross of Merit (1977),
- Gold Medal for Merit to Culture – Gloria Artis (July 14, 2011),
- Silver Medal for Merit to Culture – Gloria Artis (June 27, 2006),
- Badge of Honor "Distinguished Cultural Activist",
- Honorary Badge of Merit for the Lower Silesian Voivodeship (2016),
- Honorary Badge of Wrocław (2021).
