= Joo Don-sik =

South Korean politician (1937–2022)

Minister of Culture and Sports
- In office 24 December 1994 – 20 December 1995
- Preceded by: Lee Min-sup
- Succeeded by: Kim Yeong-su

Personal details
- Born: 8 July 1937; Chūseinan Province, Korea, Empire of Japan
- Died: 2 August 2022 (aged 85); Seoul, South Korea
- Political party: Independent
- Education: Seoul National University; Korea University; Kyung Hee University
- Occupation: Secretary, politician

Joo Don-sik (Korean: 주돈식; 8 July 1937 – 2 August 2022) was a South Korean politician. An independent, he served as Minister of Culture and Sports from 1994 to 1995.

Joo died in Seoul on 2 August 2022, at the age of 85.
