= Francesco Manganelli =

Italian politician and writer (1940–2022)

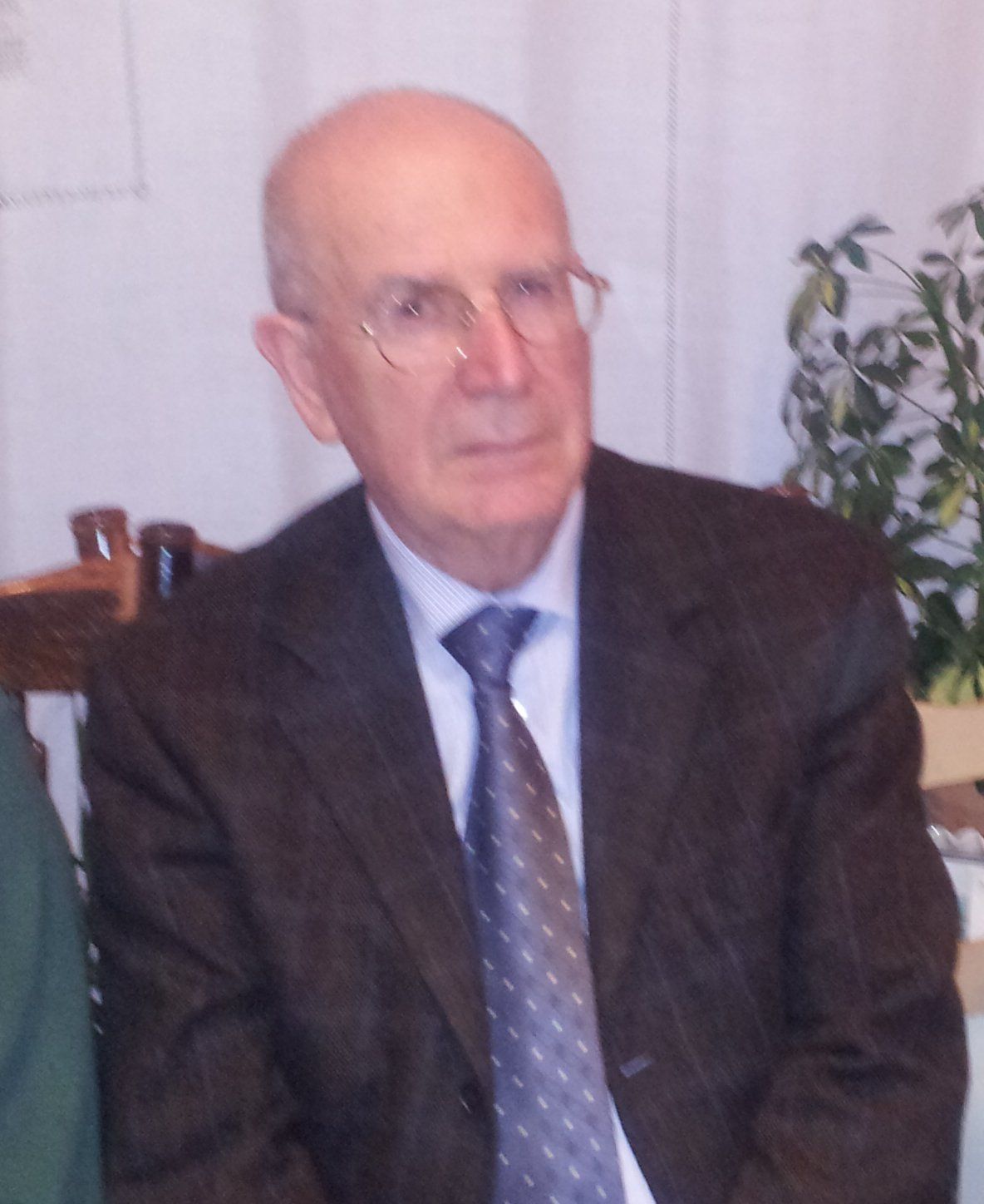

Francesco Manganelli (20 October 1940 – 31 August 2022) was an Italian writer and politician who served as a Deputy.
