= Arthur Secunda =

American sculptor (1927–2022)

Arthur Secunda (November 12, 1927, Jersey City, New Jersey – August 30, 2022) was an American painter, sculptor, and printmaker. Secunda had his first one-man show in 1950 at the Galerie Lucien Gout in Montpellier. His works hang in the permanent collections of institutions worldwide including the Museum of Modern Art in New York, the Library of Congress in Washington, DC, the Chicago Art Institute, the Honolulu Academy of Fine Arts, and the Detroit Art Institute.

Secunda was one of the mail artist Ray Johnson's first correspondents and the man to whom Johnson traced the beginnings of his work in Correspondance Art. Johnson sent his school friend drawings of female movie stars after Secunda's family moved away from Detroit in 1943.

Secunda died on August 30, 2022, aged 94.
