= Eddie Deerfield =

American government official (1923–2022)

Eddie Deerfield (August 24, 1923 – August 30, 2022) was an American government official and aviator. A high-ranking member of the United States Information Agency, he was also a decorated veteran of World War II and the Korean War.

== Early life ==
Deerfield was born in August 1923, in Omaha, Nebraska. He graduated from high school in Chicago, Illinois in 1941.

== Military service ==
After the attack on Pearl Harbor, he enlisted in the United States Army Air Corps. Deerfield arrived in England in 1943. He was a radio operator and gunner on B-17's and served with the 303rd Bomb Group. Deerfield flew 30 combat missions over Nazi Germany and Occupied Europe. On his 6th bombing mission over Kassel, Germany, his bomber was hit and crashed into the North Sea. On his 14th mission, he survived a bail-out from a burning bomber and a crash landing on his 20th mission. He was wounded by anti-aircraft fire over Saarbrücken, Germany on his 30th mission. Deerfield was honorably discharged in 1945 as a technical sergeant. he was awarded a Distinguished Flying Cross, the Air Medal with three Oak Leaf Clusters and a Purple Heart.

He was commissioned as a second lieutenant in the U. S. Army Reserve in 1949 and called back into service in 1951 in the 1st Radio Broadcasting and Leaflet Group, a psychological warfare unit. He was based in Pusan, Korea, as detachment commander. He was awarded a citation by the Republic of Korea "for aggressive leadership" in directing radio broadcasts to the enemy. He retired in 1983 with the rank of lieutenant colonel.

== Diplomatic career ==
Deerfield served abroad as a Foreign Service diplomat for more than two decades (1966 to 1988) in the U. S. Information Agency, with assignments as public affairs officer in India, Pakistan, Malawi, Canada, Uganda and Nigeria. He received the USIA Career Achievement Award (1988) for promoting a better understanding of the United States among peoples abroad, the USIA Superior Honor Award (1981) for establishing an American Center in war-ravaged Uganda after the fall of dictator Idi Amin, and the State Department Meritorious Honor Award (1971) for assisting American news correspondents covering a cyclone disaster which took the lives of thousands in East Pakistan, now Bangladesh. He retired in 1988 as counselor in the U. S. Senior Foreign Service.

== Later life and death ==
From 1997 to 1999, Deerfield was chairman of the Foreign Service Retirees Association of Florida. In 1996, he was elected president of the 303rd Bomb Group Association, and served as its newsletter editor from 1998 to 2007. In 1965, he was elected vice-president of the State of Illinois Chapter of the Reserve Officers Association. In 1958, as a resident of Hoffman Estates, Illinois, he was elected by popular vote to the town's first board of trustees. Deerfield's historical novel "The Psy-Warriors," about the Korean War was published in 1994. He was editor of the two-volume 1,300 page anthology "Hell's Angels Newsletter Silver Anniversary Collection--A World War II Retrospective" published in 2002 and a third volume published in 2007. The books focus on personal narratives of aerial combat on B-17 bombers in the European Theater of Operations during World War II, and are available for research at university, military and community libraries. In 2010 he was awarded the Legion of Honor by the government of France for combat missions in the World War II Normandy campaign which led to the freeing of France from Nazi occupation.

Deerfield died on August 30, 2022, at the age of 99.

== Sources ==
- Eddie Deerfield Biography — 303rd Bomb Group
