= Wang Weiqi =

Chinese biomedician (1939–2022)

- 王威琪
- Born: 30 May 1939; Shanghai, China
- Died: 26 August 2022 (aged 83); Shanghai, China
- Education: Fudan University
- Scientific career
- Fields: Biomedical engineering
- Workplaces: Fudan University

Wang Weiqi (Chinese: 王威琪; pinyin: Wáng Wēiqí; 30 May 1939 – 26 August 2022) was a Chinese biomedician who was a professor at Fudan University, and an academician of the Chinese Academy of Engineering.

== Biography ==
Wang was born in Shanghai, on 30 May 1939, while his ancestral home in Haimen, Jiangsu. He attended Wusong High School. After graduating from Fudan University in 1961, he stayed at the university and worked successively as associate professor and full professor in 1988. On 26 August 2022, he died of an illness in Shanghai, at the age of 83.

== Contributions ==
Wang took the lead in carrying out blood flow detection research in China, he successfully trial manufactured the first "electromagnetic blood flowmeter" in China, and developed a 60 unit B-type ultrasonic diagnostic instrument, and proposed an independent method for quantitatively measuring blood flow velocity by using dual ultrasonic beam doppler effect, making a series of original and outstanding contributions to basic research of ultrasonic diagnosis.

== Honours and awards ==
- 1999 Member of the Chinese Academy of Engineering (CAE)
