= Rosina Lajo =

Spanish politician (1931–2022)

Member of the Congress of Deputies
- In office 2 July 1977 – 28 July 1978
- Constituency: Girona

Personal details
- Born: Rosina Lajo Pérez; 1931 Valladolid, Spain
- Died: 10 August 2022 (aged 90) Valladolid, Spain
- Party: PSC–PSOE
- Education: University of Valladolid
- Occupation: Teacher

Rosina Lajo Pérez (1931 – 10 August 2022) was a Spanish politician. A member of the Socialists' Party of Catalonia, she served in the Congress of Deputies from 1977 to 1978.

Lajo died in Valladolid on 10 August 2022, at the age of 90.
