= Louis Burgio =

American gerontologist (1954–2022)

Louis D. Burgio (May 16, 1954 – August 20, 2022) was an American gerontologist formerly the Harold R. Johnson Professor of Social Work and research professor at University of Michigan and previously a UA Distinguished Professor at University of Alabama.

== Early life and education ==
Burgio was born on 16 May 1954 in Buffalo to John Burgio and Angeline Burgio (née Lipomi). He grew up in a Sicilian Italian neighborhood in Buffalo. He studied at Canesius College, and then at the University of Notre Dame where he got his Ph.D. developmental psychology and applied behavior analysis.
