= Kadyr Baikenov =

Kazakh engineer and politician (1944–2022)

Minister of Energy and Fuel Resources
- In office February 1992 – June 1994
- Preceded by: Bulat Nurzhanov
- Succeeded by: Vladimir Karmakov

Personal details
- Born: Kadyr Karkabatuly Baikenov; 10 October 1944 Kurshim, Kazakh SSR, East Kazakhstan Region, Soviet Union
- Died: 31 August 2022 (aged 77)
- Education: STANKIN; Russian Presidential Academy of National Economy and Public Administration
- Occupation: Engineer

Kadyr Karkabatuly Baikenov (Kazakh: Қадыр Қарқабатұлы Бәйкенов, Qadyr Qarqabatūly Bäikenov; 10 October 1944 – 31 August 2022) was a Kazakh engineer and politician. He served as Minister of Energy and Fuel Resources from 1992 to 1994.

== Biography ==
He was born on 10 October 1944 in the village of Kumashkino, Kurchumsky District, East Kazakhstan Region. He comes from the Uak clan.

In 1961, he graduated from secondary school in Uralsk.

In 1966, he graduated from the Moscow Machine Tool Institute with a degree in mechanical engineering.

In 1983, he entered and in 1985 graduated from the Academy of National Economy under the Council of Ministers of the USSR with a specialization as a senior specialist in national economy management.

Baikenov died on 31 August 2022, at the age of 77.
