= Theodor Heinrich Schiebler =

German anatomist (1923–2022)

Theodor Heinrich Schiebler (3 February 1923 – 27 August 2022) was a German anatomist.

== Life and career ==
Schiebler was born in Berlin on 3 February 1923, as the son of Theodor Schiebler and his wife Hedwig Schiebler, née Bombach. He graduated from high school (Abitur) in 1940 and subsequently took part in World War II as a Wehrmacht soldier. After being wounded, he began studying medicine at the University of Würzburg in 1942 and passed his medical preliminary examination in 1944. After redeployment and being briefly prisoner of war, he continued his studies in 1945 at the University of Göttingen and graduated there in 1948.

In 1948 he received his doctorate in Göttingen. After a short residency in anatomy, Schiebler went in 1949 to the University of Kiel, where he worked as a research assistant at the institute of Anatomy. From October 1950 to September 1951 he did research at the Karolinska Institute under a Rockefeller Fellowship. His habilitation took place in Kiel in 1955. In 1962 he was appointed an extraordinary professor of anatomy in Kiel and in 1962 an extraordinary professor. In the following year, 1963, Schiebler accepted an appointment at the University of Würzburg. In 1966 he was appointed a full professor here. In 1970/1972 he was Dean of the Medical Faculty. He was emeritus in 1990.

Schiebler was married and father of five children. He died on 27 August 2022, at the age of 99.

== Work ==
Theodor Schiebler researched tissues of the neuroendocrine system, the kidney and the placenta using methods of histochemistry and electron microscopy and was the author of over 150 scientific publications.

In addition, Schiebler was the author of an anatomical textbook, which was published in ten editions (most recently in 2007). He also translated and supplemented the histology textbook by Luiz Carlos Uchôa Junqueira (last edition with Schiebler's collaboration in 1996).

== Awards (selection) ==
- 1968: Member of the Academy of Sciences Leopoldina
- 1986: Honorary member of the American Association for Anatomy
- 1987: Honorary doctorate from the University of Nancy I
- Honorary member of the German Anatomical Society

== Selected publications ==
- Schiebler, T. H. (2007). Anatomie : Histologie, Entwicklungsgeschichte, makroskopische und mikroskopische Anatomie, Topographie; unter Berücksichtigung des Gegenstandskatalogs. Darmstadt: Steinkopff Verlag. ISBN 978-3-7985-1771-4.
- Carneiro, José (1996). Histologie : Zytologie, Histologie und mikroskopische Anatomie des Menschen; unter Berücksichtigung der Histophysiologie; mit 21 Tabellen. Berlin: Springer. ISBN 978-3540604044.
