= Deaths in January 2022 =

The following is a list of notable deaths in January 2022.

Entries for each day are listed alphabetically by surname. A typical entry lists information in the following sequence:

- Name, age, country of citizenship at birth, subsequent country of citizenship (if applicable), reason for notability, cause of death (if known), and reference.

== January 2022 ==
=== 1 ===
- Ramiz Abutalibov, 84, Azerbaijani diplomat and historian.
- Paul Adegboyega Olawoore, 60, Nigerian Roman Catholic prelate, coadjutor bishop (2018–2019) and bishop (since 2019) of Ilorin.
- Edna Brown, 81, American politician, member of the Ohio Senate (2011–2018) and House of Representatives (2002–2010).
- Gary Burgess, 46, British broadcaster (ITV Channel Television), cancer.
- Barbara Chilcott, 99, Canadian actress (The Full Treatment, The Trap, M. Butterfly).
- Maurice B. Cohill Jr., 92, American jurist, judge (since 1976) and chief judge (1985–1992) of the U.S. District Court for Western Pennsylvania, complications from a stroke.
- David Cunliffe, 86, British television director and producer (The Attic: The Hiding of Anne Frank).
- Patricia DeCoursey, 89, American biologist.
- Jean-Pierre Defontaine, 84, French politician, deputy (1978–2007).
- Francesco Forte, 92, Italian politician, economist and academic, MP (1979–1994), minister of European affairs (1983–1986) and of finance (1982–1983).
- Richard Freed, 93, American music critic, heart attack.
- Sir Victor Garland, 87, Australian politician and diplomat, MP (1969–1981) and high commissioner to the United Kingdom (1981–1983).
- Peter J. Hammond, 87, English screenwriter (Sapphire & Steel, The Bill, Torchwood) and novelist (Downtimers).
- Gergely Homonnay, 46, Hungarian writer, journalist and LGBTQ activist.
- Arnold Jeter, 82, American college football coach (Delaware State, New Jersey City).
- Max Julien, 88, American actor (The Mack, Getting Straight) and screenwriter (Cleopatra Jones).
- Andreas Kunz, 75, German Nordic combined competitor, Olympic bronze medalist (1968).
- Theodore Kuwana, 90, American chemist, pneumonia.
- Roger-Xavier Lantéri, 91, French journalist.
- Bob Leamy, 87, New Zealand Roman Catholic prelate, bishop of Rarotonga (1984–1996).
- Janusz Łęski, 91, Polish film director (Janna) and screenwriter.
- Mighty Bomber, 93, Grenadian-born Trinidad and Tobago calypsonian.
- Anthony Obi, 69, Nigerian politician, military administrator of Osun State (1996–1998).
- Pierre Parsus, 100, French painter and illustrator.
- Dan Reeves, 77, American football player (Dallas Cowboys) and coach (Denver Broncos, Atlanta Falcons), Super Bowl champion (1972), complications from dementia.
- Ralph Staub, 93, American football coach (Cincinnati Bearcats, Ohio State Buckeyes, Houston Oilers).
- Calisto Tanzi, 83, Italian food industry executive and convicted fraudster, founder of Parmalat and owner of Parma Calcio (1989–2003), lung infection.
- Jean-Charles Terrassier, 81, French psychologist.
- Jim Toy, 91, American LGBTQ activist.
- Xu Xingchu, 87, Chinese engineer, member of the Chinese Academy of Sciences.
- David E. Zweifel, 87, American diplomat.

=== 2 ===
- Saliu Adetunji, 93, Nigerian traditional ruler, Olubadan of Ibadan (since 2016).
- Juan Manuel Albendea Pabón, 84, Spanish economist, bullfighting critic, and politician, deputy (1996–2015).
- Larry Biittner, 75, American baseball player (Chicago Cubs, Washington Senators/Texas Rangers, Montreal Expos), cancer.
- Kay Brown, 88, American singer and actress (The Strip).
- Afra Bukhari, 83, Pakistani writer.
- Jean-Guy Couture, 92, Canadian Roman Catholic prelate, bishop of Chicoutimi (1979–2004).
- Edward J. Cowan, 77, Scottish historian, lung cancer.
- Da Hoss, 29, American racehorse.
- John Efford, 77, Canadian politician, MP (2002–2006) and Newfoundland and Labrador MHA (1985–2001).
- Eric Walter Elst, 85, Belgian astronomer.
- Jody Gibson, 64, American convicted procurer.
- Bob Halloran, 87, American sportscaster (CBS Sports).
- Jens Jørgen Hansen, 82, Danish football player (Esbjerg fB, national team) and manager.
- Jarmo Jääskeläinen, 84, Finnish journalist and documentary filmmaker.
- Johan Jansonius, 89, Dutch chemist and structural biologist.
- Jorma Katrama, 85, Finnish double bassist.
- Charles Stuart Kennedy, 93, American oral historian.
- Kenny J, 69, Trinidad and Tobago calypsonian and soca parang singer, COVID-19.
- Richard Leakey, 77, Kenyan paleoanthropologist, conservationist, and politician, co-founder of Safina and WildlifeDirect.
- Maharram Mammadyarov, 97, Azerbaijani chemist, member of the Azerbaijan National Academy of Sciences.
- Abd al-Mawla Naqi, 90, Libyan politician, deputy (1960–1964).
- Dorothy McGowan, 82, American model and actress (Who Are You, Polly Maggoo?).
- Hamish More, 81, Scottish cricketer (national team).
- Ion Niculiță, 82, Moldovan archaeologist.
- Charles Njonjo, 101, Kenyan jurist and politician, attorney general (1963–1973), minister of justice (1978–1982) and MP (1980–1983), pneumonia.
- John Quinn, 67, British legal adviser, attorney general of the Isle of Man (since 2017).
- Hagit Shatkay, 56, Israeli-American computer scientist.
- Basti Vaman Shenoy, 87, Indian writer and political activist, founder of World Konkani Centre.
- R. N. Singh, 74, Indian politician, Maharashtra MLC (since 2016), heart disease.
- Joan Soler i Amigó, 80, Spanish pedagogue and writer.
- Traxamillion, 42, American hip hop producer, cancer.
- Robert H. Waterman Jr., 85, American business theorist and author (In Search of Excellence).
- Zhou Xiaofeng, 57, Chinese entrepreneur and politician, member of the National People's Congress (2008–2012).

=== 3 ===
- Oussou Konan Anicet, 32, Ivorian footballer (Makkasa, HJK, Nam Dinh).
- George Bălan, 92, Romanian philosopher, COVID-19.
- Odell Barry, 80, American football player (Denver Broncos) and politician, mayor of Northglenn, Colorado (1980–1982), heart disease.
- Egle Becchi, 91, Italian pedagogist, historian and academic.
- Mordechai Ben-Porat, 98, Israeli politician, MK (1965–1984).
- Igor Bogdanoff, 72, French television presenter and academic fraudster (Bogdanov affair), COVID-19.
- Gina Cabrera, 93, Cuban actress (The White Rose, Star Without Light).
- Gianni Celati, 84, Italian writer and translator, complications from a broken hip.
- Daniel Colliard, 91, French politician, deputy (1993–1997).
- Louis Tuffly Ellis, 95, American historian.
- Mel Foss, 82, Canadian football player (Edmonton Eskimos).
- Olga Gavrilova, 64, Russian javelin thrower.
- John D. Hawke Jr., 88, American lawyer and politician, under secretary of the Treasury for domestic finance (1995–1998).
- Nancy B. Jackson, 65, American chemist.
- Ulysses Kokkinos, 73, Turkish-born Australian footballer (South Melbourne Hellas, Melbourne Juventus).
- Mario Lanfranchi, 94, Italian film director (Death Sentence, Merciless Man, The Mistress Is Served) and screenwriter.
- Kamel Lemoui, 82, Algerian football player (Béziers, MC Alger) and manager (national team), COVID-19.
- Jud Logan, 62, American four-time Olympic hammer thrower, complications from COVID-19.
- Zbigniew Łój, 76, Polish Olympic field hockey player (1972).
- Adam Maldzis, 89, Belarusian historian and literary critic.
- Tu'u Maori, 33, New Zealand-born Papua New Guinean rugby league player (national team), motor neurone disease.
- Willie McCray, 68, American football player (San Francisco 49ers).
- Beatrice Mintz, 100, American embryologist.
- Silvino Adolfo Morais, 65, East Timorese politician, MNP (since 2018), complications from a heart attack.
- Jiří Patera, 85, Czech-born Canadian mathematician.
- Carter Revard, 90, American poet and scholar.
- Wayne Rollings, 80, American major general.
- Viktor Saneyev, 76, Georgian triple jumper, Olympic champion (1968, 1972, 1976).
- S. H. Sarma, 99, Indian vice admiral, FOCEF (1971–1973) and commandant of the National Defence College (1975–1977).
- Richard Sinnott, 74, Irish academic, political commentator and broadcaster.
- Harvey G. Stack, 93, American numismatist.
- Nino Sydney, 89, Yugoslav-born Australian architect and water polo player.
- Claude Taittinger, 94, French businessman, director of Taittinger.
- Bashir Tofa, 74, Nigerian politician, MP (1977–1979).
- Lila Wallis, 100, Polish-born American endocrinologist and hematologist.
- Frederick E. Wang, 89, Taiwanese-American physicist.
- Marice Moylan Wolfe, 86, American archivist.
- Jay Wolpert, 79, American television producer (The Price Is Right) and screenwriter (Pirates of the Caribbean, The Count of Monte Cristo), complications from Alzheimer's disease.
- Zheng Min, 101, Chinese poet.
- Vladan Živković, 80, Serbian actor (England Made Me, Cross of Iron, A Tight Spot).
- Frank Zuccarelli, 70, American politician.

=== 4 ===
- Rolf-Dieter Amend, 72, German slalom canoeist, Olympic champion (1972).
- William M. Anderson, 73, Irish film editor (Dead Poets Society, The Truman Show, Tender Mercies), cancer.
- Leanne Armand, 53, Australian marine scientist, cancer.
- Javier Astúa, 53, Costa Rican footballer (Puntarenas, Palestino, national team), heart disease.
- Michael Billen, 66, German politician, member of the Rhineland-Palatinate Landtag (1996–2020), leukemia.
- Ross Browner, 67, American Hall of Fame football player (Notre Dame Fighting Irish, Cincinnati Bengals, Green Bay Packers), complications from COVID-19.
- Tyrone Caldwell, 74, American football player and coach (Maryland Eastern Shore Hawks).
- David Carpenter, 86, English cricketer (Gloucestershire).
- Hilton Cheong-Leen, 99, Hong Kong politician, member (1957–1991) and chairman (1983–1986) of the Urban Council, member of the Legislative Council (1973–1979, 1985–1988).
- Joan Copeland, 99, American actress (Search for Tomorrow, Brother Bear, The Peacemaker).
- Jim Corsi, 60, American baseball player (Oakland Athletics, Boston Red Sox, Houston Astros), liver and colon cancer.
- Sergio Dangelo, 89, Italian surrealistic painter.
- William M. Ellinghaus, 99, American business executive, president of AT&T (1979–1984).
- Julio Ferrer, 68, Puerto Rican Olympic sprinter (1976).
- Max Fordham, 88, British engineer.
- Aranka Goijert, 80, Dutch politician, senator (2007–2011).
- Percy Hobson, 79, Australian high jumper, British Empire and Commonwealth Games gold medallist (1962).
- William Terrell Hodges, 87, American jurist, judge (since 1971) and chief judge (1982–1989) of the U.S. District Court for Middle Florida.
- Gertrude Reif Hughes, 85, American anthroposophist.
- Jaakko Jonkka, 68, Finnish jurist, chancellor of justice (2007–2018).
- Kevin Kalkhoven, 77, Australian telecom (JDS Uniphase) and motorsport (Champ Car World Series) executive and motor racing team owner (KV Racing Technology).
- Anatoliy Kuksov, 72, Ukrainian football player (Zorya Luhansk, Soviet Union national team) and coach (Hirnyk Rovenky), Olympic bronze medallist (1972).
- Carl Linhart, 92, Slovak-born American baseball player (Detroit Tigers).
- Tom Matchick, 78, American baseball player (Detroit Tigers, Kansas City Royals, Milwaukee Brewers), World Series champion (1968), COVID-19.
- María Mérida, 96, Spanish folk singer.
- Andreas Michalopoulos, 73, Greek footballer (Panachaiki, national team).
- Irma Mico, 107, Austro-Hungarian-born French resistance fighter.
- Arnold Modell, 97, American psychologist.
- Henny Orri, 96, Dutch actress (Puppet on a Chain, Dokter Pulder zaait papavers).
- Darryl Owens, 84, American politician, member of the Kentucky House of Representatives (2005–2019).
- Craig Ruddy, 53, Australian artist, complications from COVID-19.
- Sindhutai Sapkal, 73, Indian social worker, heart attack.
- Darwin Semotiuk, 76, Canadian football coach (Western Mustangs) and basketball player (national team), complications from sepsis.
- Stelios Serafidis, 86, Greek football player (AEK Athens, national team) and coach, cancer.
- Keishu Tanaka, 83, Japanese politician, minister of justice (2012) and three-time MP.

=== 5 ===
- Josephine Abercrombie, 95, American horse breeder.
- Francisco Álvarez Martínez, 96, Spanish Roman Catholic cardinal, bishop of Tarazona (1973–1976) and Orihuela-Alicante (1989–1995), archbishop of Toledo (1995–2002).
- Lowell Amos, 79, American convicted murderer.
- Rose Beauchamp, 75, New Zealand puppeteer and pianist.
- Enrico Berti, 86, Italian philosopher.
- Robert Blust, 81, American linguist, cancer.
- Stephen Bouquet, 55, British cat killer, COVID-19.
- Lawrence Brooks, 112, American supercentenarian, nation's oldest living man and oldest WWII veteran.
- Bill Bryden, 79, Scottish theatre and film director.
- Dale Clevenger, 81, American horn player, Grammy winner (1994, 2001), complications from Waldenstrom's disease.
- Antoni Dalmau, 70, Spanish politician and writer, member of the Catalan parliament (1988–1999) and president of the Provincial Deputation of Barcelona (1982–1987).
- Yoshihide Fukutome, 88, Japanese Olympic pentathlete (1964).
- Alyaksandr Fyedarovich, 48, Belarusian football player (BATE Borisov, Dnepr Mogilev, Naftan Novopolotsk) and coach.
- Valeriy Gorbach, 53, Tajik footballer (Fakel Voronezh, Lokomotiv Liski, national team), heart failure.
- Keith Goullet, 89, Australian footballer (North Melbourne).
- Mohamed Hilmi, 90, Algerian film director and actor.
- Filza Khamidullin, 86, Russian economist and politician, senator (2003–2005).
- Kim Mi-soo, 29, South Korean actress (Hi Bye, Mama!, The School Nurse Files, Snowdrop).
- Jack Kissane, 92, Irish Gaelic footballer (Galway) and brigadier general.
- Charlie Luce, 93, American basketball coach.
- Saleh al-Luhaydan, 89, Saudi Arabian Islamic scholar.
- Marian Machowski, 89, Polish footballer (Wisła Kraków, national team).
- John J. Miller, 67, American author (Wild Cards).
- John Moriarty, 91, American conductor.
- Ralph Neely, 78, American football player (Dallas Cowboys), Super Bowl champion (1972, 1978).
- Neil Nongkynrih, 51, Indian pianist, founder of Shillong Chamber Choir.
- Anatole Novak, 84, French road bicycle racer.
- Siiri Perälä, 28, Finnish futsal player, B-cell lymphoma.
- Aiyappan Pillai, 107, Indian lawyer and politician, heart disease.
- Sir Allan Ramsay, 84, British diplomat, ambassador to Lebanon (1988–1990), Sudan (1990–1991) and Morocco (1992–1996).
- Greg Robinson, 70, American football coach (Syracuse University, UCLA Bruins, Denver Broncos), complications from Alzheimer's disease.
- George Rossi, 60, Scottish actor (The Bill, Roughnecks, The Singing Detective), pancreatic cancer.
- Peter Saville, 75, British psychologist.
- Shahid Uddin Ahmed Selim, 68, Bangladeshi footballer (Brothers Union, national team), oral cancer.
- Mircea Stoenescu, 78, Romanian footballer (Dinamo București) and referee.
- Arnljot Strømme Svendsen, 100, Norwegian economist, politician, and writer.
- Olga Szabó-Orbán, 83, Romanian fencer, Olympic silver medallist (1956).
- Frank H. Wadsworth, 106, American forester and conservationist.

=== 6 ===
- Peter Bogdanovich, 82, American film director (The Last Picture Show, What's Up, Doc?, Paper Moon), actor and writer, complications from Parkinson's disease.
- Ray Boyle, 98, American actor (Zombies of the Stratosphere, The Life and Legend of Wyatt Earp) and production designer (A Boy and His Dog).
- José Cardoso Dutra, 84, Brazilian politician, deputy (1987–1995), cardiac arrest.
- Maria Victoria Carpio-Bernido, 60, Filipino physicist, colon cancer.
- Gritakumar E. Chitty, 82, Sri Lankan jurist and diplomat.
- A. Jamie Cuticchia, 55, American geneticist, cancer.
- Éliane Dudal, 95, French Olympic long jumper (1952).
- Bob Falkenburg, 95, American Hall of Fame tennis player and businessman, founder of Bob's.
- Kass Fleisher, 63, American author.
- Vladimir Gudev, 81, Russian diplomat, Soviet ambassador to Iran (1987–1993), Egypt (1995–2000) and Georgia (2000–2002).
- Larry Haylor, 76, Canadian football coach (Western Ontario Mustangs), heart attack.
- Barbara Jacket, 87, American track and field coach (Prairie View A&M) and athletic director.
- F. Sionil José, 97, Filipino writer (Po-on, Sin, Three Filipino Women).
- Maria Klenskaja, 70, Estonian actress (Autumn, Rahu tänav, Vana daami visiit).
- E. F. K. Koerner, 82, German linguist.
- Mariano Laurenti, 92, Italian film director (Ubalda, All Naked and Warm, The Schoolteacher Goes to Boys' High, How to Seduce Your Teacher) and actor.
- Jo Manning, 98, Canadian etcher, painter and author, euthanasia.
- Carlo Meliciani, 92, Italian operatic baritone.
- Rómulo Méndez, 83, Guatemalan football referee.
- Enrique Montserrat, 86, Spanish Olympic gymnast.
- Ursula O'Farrell, 87, Irish author.
- Volodymyr Pak, 87, Ukrainian politician, deputy (2005–2006).
- Murray Peden, 98, Canadian Air Force pilot and author.
- Gloria Piedimonte, 66, Italian actress (The Face with Two Left Feet), singer and dancer (Discoring), complications from COVID-19.
- Sidney Poitier, 94, Bahamian-American actor (In the Heat of the Night, Lilies of the Field, Guess Who's Coming to Dinner), Oscar winner (1963), heart failure.
- Julian Reed, 85, Canadian politician, Ontario MLA (1975–1985), MP (1993–2004).
- Calvin Simon, 79, American Hall of Fame singer (Parliament-Funkadelic).
- Tony Tallarico, 88, American comic book artist (Lobo).
- Yoram Taharlev, 83, Israeli songwriter and poet.
- Samuel K. Tan, 88, Filipino historian and academic, complications from COVID-19.
- Kwasi Wiredu, 90, Ghanaian philosopher.
- Clive Zanda, 82, Trinidad and Tobago jazz musician and architect, complications from diabetes.
- Zhang Jiqing, 83, Chinese Kunqu artist.

=== 7 ===
- Amanda Asay, 33, Canadian baseball player (national team), injuries sustained in skiing accident.
- Ishmael Ashitey, 67, Ghanaian politician, MP (1997–2009).
- Ahmad Bamba, 79, Ghanaian Islamic scholar.
- Stéphane Blet, 52, French classical pianist and composer, fall.
- Laurence Boissier, 56, Swiss writer and artist.
- Dee Booher, 73, American professional wrestler (GLOW) and actress (Brainsmasher... A Love Story, Spaceballs).
- Edward Bozek, 71, American Olympic fencer (1972, 1976).
- Harpdog Brown, 59, Canadian blues musician.
- Guy Cavagnac, 87, French filmmaker.
- Tom Corston, 72, Canadian Anglican prelate, bishop of Moosonee (2010–2013), cancer.
- Gerson da Cunha, 92, Indian actor (Electric Moon, Cotton Mary, Water).
- Mino De Rossi, 90, Italian road bicycle and track cyclist, Olympic champion (1952).
- Jack Dromey, 73, British politician, MP (since 2010), heart failure.
- Barbara Durkee, 86, American artist.
- José Évrard, 76, French politician, deputy (since 2017), COVID-19.
- Mark Forest, 89, American bodybuilder and actor (Goliath and the Dragon).
- George Gerberman, 79, American baseball player (Chicago Cubs), glioblastoma.
- Lani Guinier, 71, American civil rights theorist, complications from Alzheimer's disease.
- Bobby Harrison, 82, English rock drummer and singer (Procol Harum, Freedom, Snafu).
- Robert Hughes, Baron Hughes of Woodside, 90, British politician, MP (1970–1997) and chair of the Anti-Apartheid Movement (1976–1995).
- Martha Sharp Joukowsky, 85, American archaeologist.
- Anatoly Kvashnin, 75, Russian military officer, chief of the general staff (1997–2004), COVID-19.
- Francisco Laína, 85, Spanish politician.
- Liu Siqi, 91, Chinese public figure.
- Raymond Malenfant, 91, Canadian businessman.
- Robbie Moore, 67, Canadian ice hockey player (Philadelphia Flyers, Washington Capitals).
- Ruby Moscoso de Young, 80, Panamanian politician, first lady (1999–2004).
- Luis Pareto, 93, Chilean politician, three-time member and president (1973, 2001–2002) of the Chamber of Deputies.
- François Perigot, 95, French businessman and trade unionist, president of BusinessEurope (1988–1998) and CNPF (1986–1994).
- Enda Rohan, 92, Irish chess player.
- Jimmy Smith, 91, English footballer (Chelsea, Leyton Orient).
- Jorge Sotomayor Tello, 79, Peruvian-born Brazilian mathematician.
- John Swantek, 88, American Polish Catholic prelate, prime bishop (1985–2002).
- R. Dean Taylor, 82, Canadian singer-songwriter ("Indiana Wants Me", "There's a Ghost in My House") and producer ("Love Child"), complications from COVID-19.
- Alexander Timofeevskiy, 88, Russian writer, songwriter and screenwriter (The Stone Flower).
- Vitaliano Trevisan, 61, Italian writer, playwright, and actor (First Love, Riparo), suicide by drug overdose.
- Eberhard Zeidler, 95, German-born Canadian architect.

=== 8 ===
- Christian Aagaard, 84, Danish politician.
- Baktash Abtin, 48, Iranian poet and filmmaker, complications from COVID-19.
- Ramesh Babu, 56, Indian film producer (Arjun, Athidhi) and actor (Mugguru Kodukulu), liver disease.
- Eddie Basinski, 99, American baseball player (Brooklyn Dodgers, Pittsburgh Pirates, Portland Beavers).
- Marilyn Bergman, 93, American Hall of Fame songwriter ("The Way We Were", "The Windmills of Your Mind", "You Don't Bring Me Flowers"), Oscar winner (1969, 1974, 1984), respiratory failure.
- Hanef Bhamjee, 75–76, South African-British anti-apartheid activist.
- Lourdes Castro, 91, Portuguese abstract artist.
- Bill Cornish, 84, Australian-British legal scholar.
- José Curiel, 84, Venezuelan politician, governor of Falcón (1996–2000).
- Truus Dekker, 99, Dutch actress (Turkish Delight, Soldier of Orange).
- Don Dillard, 85, American baseball player (Cleveland Indians, Milwaukee Braves).
- Robin Fernando, 84, Sri Lankan actor (Veera Puran Appu, Saptha Kanya, Kolompoor), complications from Parkinson's disease.
- Mike Gore, 87, British-born Australian physicist.
- Frank Hasenfratz, 86, Hungarian-born Canadian businessman (Linamar).
- Andrew Jennings, 78, British investigative journalist, aortic aneurysm.
- Ramdas Kamat, 90, Indian musician and actor.
- Attila Kelemen, 73, Romanian politician, deputy (1996–2016) and MEP (2007).
- Michael Lang, 77, American concert producer, co-creator of Woodstock, non-Hodgkin lymphoma.
- Aleksandr Lebedev-Frontov, 61, Russian painter, collagist, and musician.
- Peter G. Levine, 61, American medical researcher.
- Viktor Mazin, 67, Russian weightlifter, Olympic champion (1980).
- Matt Miller, 49, American football player (Kansas State Wildcats).
- Jaime Ostos, 90, Spanish bullfighter, heart attack.
- Michael Parks, 78, American journalist and editor (The Los Angeles Times, The Baltimore Sun), heart attack and kidney failure.
- Carmelo Pujia, 94, Italian politician, president of the Province of Catanzaro (1970–1975) and deputy (1983–1994).
- John Rambo, 78, American high jumper, Olympic bronze medallist (1964), heart attack.
- Nina Rocheva, 73, Russian cross-country skier, Olympic silver medallist (1980).
- Stanislav Rudolf, 89, Czech writer, screenwriter and dramaturge.
- Hiranmay Sen Gupta, 87, Bangladeshi nuclear physicist, member of the Bangladesh Academy of Sciences.
- Sinan Al Shabibi, 80, Iraqi economist, governor of the central bank (2003–2012).
- Howard Solomon, 94, American businessman (Forest Laboratories).
- Sornphet Sornsuphan, 73, Thai luk thung singer.
- Manfred Srb, 80, Austrian politician, MP (1986–1994).
- Kazuo Takahashi, 91, Japanese politician, governor of Yamagata Prefecture (1993–2005).
- György Telegdy, 94, Hungarian Olympic basketball player (1952).
- Keith Todd, 80, Welsh footballer (Swansea Town, Pembroke Borough).

=== 9 ===
- Jim Bakhtiar, 88, Iranian-born American college football player (Virginia Cavaliers).
- Harley Balic, 25, Australian footballer (Fremantle, Melbourne).
- Khalid Balti, 48–50, Pakistani militant commander, spokesman of the Tehrik-i-Taliban Pakistan, shot.
- Bill Boomer, 84, American swim coach (University of Rochester).
- Moe Brooker, 81, American artist.
- Franco Cavallo, 89, Italian sailor, Olympic bronze medalist (1968).
- Viktor Chakrygin, 37, Russian footballer (Dynamo Makhachkala, Zenit Penza, Anzhi Makhachkala).
- Rudolf Čillík, 90, Slovak Olympic cross-country skier.
- Michael Joe Cosgrave, 83, Irish politician, TD (1981–1992, 1997–2002).
- Fiona Denison, 51–52, Scottish academic, suicide.
- Shakuntala Devi, 90, Indian politician, MP (1957–1967).
- Nicholas Donnelly, 83, British actor (Grange Hill, Dixon of Dock Green, Lifeforce).
- Richard Dorman, 96, British diplomat, high commissioner to Vanuatu (1982–1985).
- Wael el-Ebrashy, 58, Egyptian journalist and television presenter, complications from COVID-19.
- Maria Ewing, 71, American opera singer, cancer.
- Andrée Fortin, 68, Canadian sociologist and academic.
- Tahani al-Gebali, 71, Egyptian judge, vice president of the supreme constitutional court (2003–2012), COVID-19.
- Derek Goldby, 81, Australian theatre director.
- Althea Gwyn, 65, American basketball player.
- Dwayne Hickman, 87, American actor (The Many Loves of Dobie Gillis, The Bob Cummings Show, Cat Ballou), complications from Parkinson's disease.
- Akira Inoue, 93, Japanese film director (Zatoichi's Revenge, Sleepy Eyes of Death 7: The Mask of the Princess, Lone Wolf and Cub: Final Conflict), stroke and pneumonia.
- Mike Jones, 80, Welsh painter.
- Toshiki Kaifu, 91, Japanese politician, prime minister (1989–1991), pneumonia.
- Roman Karpyuk, 57, Ukrainian teacher and politician, member (since 2010) and deputy chairman (since 2014) of the Volyn Oblast Council.
- Abdelkrim Kerroum, 85, Algerian footballer (FC Sète 34, Troyes, national team).
- Dušan Klein, 82, Czech film director and screenwriter (How the World Is Losing Poets, How Poets Are Losing Their Illusions, How Poets Are Enjoying Their Lives).
- Per Knuts, 83, Swedish Olympic runner (1960).
- Jean Maheu, 90, French government official, president of the Centre Pompidou (1983–1989), président-directeur général of Radio France (1989–1995).
- James Maraniss, 76, American academic and librettist, Pulitzer Prize winner (2000), heart attack.
- Thomas H. McTavish, 79, American accountant, Michigan Auditor General (1989–2014).
- James Mtume, 76, American musician (Mtume) and songwriter ("Juicy Fruit", "The Closer I Get to You").
- Nguyễn Côn, 105, Vietnamese politician, deputy prime minister (1967–1976).
- Giacomo Properzj, 82, Italian politician, president of the Province of Milan (1990–1992).
- Bob Saget, 65, American comedian, television presenter (America's Funniest Home Videos) and actor (Full House, How I Met Your Mother), blunt head trauma.
- Jouni Seistamo, 82, Finnish Olympic ice hockey player (1960, 1964).
- Bob Shearer, 73, Australian golf player and course architect, heart attack.
- Desmond de Silva, 78, Sri Lankan singer, heart attack.
- Earl Swavey, 26, American rapper.
- Marc Wilkinson, 92, Australian-British composer and conductor.

=== 10 ===
- Herbert Achternbusch, 83, German film director (Hades, Der Neger Erwin, The Ghost), writer, and painter.
- Robert Allan Ackerman, 77, American television and theatre director (Life with Judy Garland: Me and My Shadows, The Reagans, Bent), kidney failure.
- Johan Anuar, 56, Indonesian politician, regent of Ogan Komering Ulu (2021), cancer.
- Garry Bradbury, 61–62, British-born Australian electronic musician. (death announced on this date)
- Marion Brash, 90, German-born American actress (Search for Tomorrow, Slaughter).
- Jan Ciechanowicz, 75, Lithuanian politician, member of the Supreme Soviet of the Soviet Union (1989–1991).
- Vince Copley, 85, Australian athlete and indigenous rights activist.
- Bill Cranston, 79, Scottish footballer (Blackpool, Preston North End, Oldham Athletic).
- John Cull, 70, Australian politician, New South Wales MLA (2001–2003).
- Martin Jay Davis, 84, American Olympic fencer (1972) and astrologer.
- Vladimir Dolgov, 61, Ukrainian swimmer, Olympic bronze medalist (1980), stomach cancer.
- James Drake, 89, American photographer (Sports Illustrated), lung cancer.
- Jim Drake, 77, American film and television director (Night Court, Mary Hartman, Mary Hartman, Police Academy 4: Citizens on Patrol).
- Gérard Drouot, 69, French artistic director and live performance organizer, leukemia.
- Ciro Durán, 84, Colombian screenwriter and film director (Gamín).
- Robert Durst, 78, American convicted murderer, subject of The Jinx, cardiac arrest.
- Joyce Eliason, 87, American television writer and producer (The Jacksons: An American Dream, The Last Don, Titanic, A Loss of Innocence).
- Alfred Gager, 79, Austrian footballer (Austria Wien, Wacker Wien, national team).
- Christian Gasc, 76, French costume designer (Madame Butterfly, Farewell, My Queen).
- Christian Görlitz, 78, German film director.
- Gerry Granahan, 89, American singer-songwriter ("Leave Me Alone (Let Me Cry)") and record producer.
- Ian Greenberg, 79, Canadian businessman, co-founder of Astral Media.
- Brian Hannon, 85, Irish Anglican prelate, lord bishop of Clogher (1986–2001).
- Aura Herzog, 97, Israeli social activist, first lady (1983–1993) and founder of the Council for a Beautiful Israel.
- Francis Jackson, 104, British organist and composer.
- Khan Jamal, 75, American jazz vibraphonist, kidney failure.
- Arthur J. Jelinek, 93, American anthropologist.
- Glyn Jones, 85, English footballer (Sheffield United, Rotherham United, Mansfield Town). (death announced on this date)
- Friedrich Kurrent, 90, Austrian architect and author.
- Deon Lendore, 29, Trinidad and Tobago sprinter, Olympic bronze medallist (2012), traffic collision.
- Gary Lindstrom, 78, American computer scientist.
- Liu Xianping, 83, Chinese writer.
- Øystein Lønn, 85, Norwegian writer.
- Taskeen Manerwal, 72, Pakistani poet.
- Margherita, Archduchess of Austria-Este, 91, Italian aristocrat.
- Mary A. Marsh, 91, American brigadier general.
- Don Maynard, 86, American Hall of Fame football player (New York Titans / Jets, New York Giants, St. Louis Cardinals), Super Bowl champion (1969).
- Ali Mitgutsch, 86, German illustrator, pneumonia.
- Shinji Mizushima, 82, Japanese manga artist (Yakyū-kyō no Uta, Dokaben, Abu-san), pneumonia.
- Miguel Muñiz, 82, Spanish economist, president of Official Credit Institute (1986–1995) and director of Teatro Real (2004–2012).
- Valentine Palmer, 86, English voice coach, singer and actor (Doctor Who, The Six Wives of Henry VIII, Emmerdale).
- Chandrashekhar Patil, 82, Indian poet and playwright.
- Alejandro Quiroz, 101, Mexican Olympic pentathlete (1948).
- Olavi Rinteenpää, 97, Finnish Olympic steeplechase runner (1952, 1956).
- Nils A. Røhne, 72, Norwegian politician, deputy MP (1997–2009).
- Tina Scala, 86, Italian-Irish actress (Capone).
- Burke Shelley, 71, Welsh bassist and vocalist (Budgie).
- Colin Slater, 87, English football commentator (BBC Radio Nottingham).
- Ronald Stewart, 94, Canadian politician, MP (1979–1988).
- Zhanat Suleimenov, 59, Kazakh military leader and politician, deputy minister of internal affairs (2017–2019), suicide.
- Gerald Tanner, 100, Australian footballer (Richmond).
- Silvia Tortora, 59, Italian journalist.
- Abdurrahman Vazirov, 91, Azerbaijani politician, leader of Azerbaijan SSR (1988–1990).
- Gary Waldhorn, 78, English actor (The Vicar of Dibley, Brush Strokes, All at No 20).

=== 11 ===
- Anatoly Alyabyev, 70, Russian biathlete, Olympic champion (1980 individual, 1980 relay), COVID-19.
- Clyde Bellecourt, 85, American civil rights activist, co-founder of the American Indian Movement, cancer.
- Jana Bennett, 66, American-born British media executive, brain cancer.
- Orlando Busino, 95, American cartoonist.
- Ahmet Yılmaz Çalık, 27, Turkish footballer (Galatasaray, Konyaspor, national team), traffic collision.
- Jeffery Paul Chan, 79, American author (Aiiieeeee! An Anthology of Asian-American Writers) and scholar.
- Stephen Churchett, 74, British actor (EastEnders, Doctor Who, Agatha Christie's Marple).
- Mike Cochran, 85, American journalist (Associated Press, Fort Worth Star-Telegram).
- Evence-Charles Coppée, 68, Belgian press director, director of Libération (1996–2005).
- Jerry Crutchfield, 87, American music executive.
- Mihir Das, 62, Indian actor (To Bina Bhala Lagena, Dream Girl, Tu Mo Love Story).
- Razmik Davoyan, 81, Armenian poet.
- Louis Dupré, 96, Belgian religious philosopher.
- Marion Fahey, 96, American superintendent.
- Francesco Focardi, 72, Italian Roman Catholic prelate, vicar apostolic of Camiri (2009–2017).
- Richard Folmer, 79, American actor (The St. Tammany Miracle, Mad Money, Straw Dogs).
- Jerzy Głowacki, 71, Polish Olympic cyclist (1972).
- Dinos Hadjinicolas, 66, Cypriot politician, member of the House of Representatives (2003–2011).
- M. Daria Haust, 100, Polish-born Canadian pathologist.
- Marleen Hutchful, 35, Ghanaian actress (Things We Do for Love), acute myeloid leukemia.
- Boris Khazanov, 93, Russian writer.
- Armand Loreau, 90, French Olympic sprint canoer.
- Liv Lundberg, 77, Norwegian poet and novelist.
- Magawa, 8, Cambodian African giant pouched rat, HeroRAT.
- Duryodhan Majhi, 83, Indian politician, Odisha MLA (1990–2019).
- Kay McNamee, 91, Canadian Olympic swimmer (1948, 1952), complications from COVID-19.
- Larry Mead, 83, American politician.
- Khaleel Mohammed, 66, Guyanese-Canadian religious scholar. (death announced on this date)
- Abdillahi Nassir, 89, Kenyan Islamic scholar.
- Hans Nisblé, 76, German politician.
- Pang Chien-kuo, 68, Taiwanese politician, member of the Legislative Yuan (2002–2005), fall.
- Klaus Ploghaus, 65, German hammer thrower, Olympic bronze medalist (1984).
- Karl Harrington Potter, 94, American Indologist.
- A. G. S. Ram Babu, 59, Indian politician, MP (1989–2001), COVID-19.
- Herman Rechberger, 74, Austrian-born Finnish composer.
- Tim Rosaforte, 66, American golf writer (Sports Illustrated, Golf Digest) and broadcaster (ESPN), complications from Alzheimer's disease.
- Jordi Sabatés, 73, Spanish pianist.
- Guy Sajer, 94, French writer (The Forgotten Soldier) and cartoonist.
- Phil Samis, 94, Canadian ice hockey player (Toronto Maple Leafs), Stanley Cup champion (1948).
- Noureddine Sammoud, 90, Tunisian author.
- David Sassoli, 65, Italian politician and journalist, member (since 2009) and president (since 2019) of the European Parliament, complications from multiple myeloma.
- Arna Schram, 53, Icelandic journalist (DV, Morgunblaðið, Viðskiptablaðið).
- Rosa Schupbach, 93, American economist.
- Ernest Shonekan, 85, Nigerian politician, interim head of state (1993).
- Snowfall, 3, Japanese-bred Irish racehorse, euthanized.
- Valentina Sorokina, 85, Russian politician, member of the Supreme Soviet of the Soviet Union (1971–1975).
- Don Sutherin, 85, American Hall of Fame football player (Hamilton Tiger-Cats, Ottawa Rough Riders, Pittsburgh Steelers) and coach, complications from COVID-19.
- Charles V. Willie, 94, American sociologist.
- Jules Wright, 88, American politician, member of the Alaska House of Representatives (1967–1969).

=== 12 ===
- Adebayo Alao-Akala, 71, Nigerian politician, governor of Oyo State (2006, 2007–2011).
- Luis Castañeda, 76, Peruvian politician and lawyer, mayor of Lima (2003–2010, 2015–2018), cardiopulmonary arrest.
- CPO Boss Hogg, 58, American rapper.
- Marie-José Denys, 71, French politician, MEP (1989–1994, 1997–1999).
- Jan Einar Greve, 88, Norwegian lawyer.
- Colin Harburn, 83, Australian cricketer (Western Australia).
- William Hogan, 84, Canadian politician, Newfoundland and Labrador MHA (1989–1993).
- Marc Janson, 91, Belgian-born French painter.
- Willem Jewett, 58, American politician, member of the Vermont House of Representatives (2003–2017), assisted suicide.
- Serge Koster, 81, French writer and academic.
- Stjepan Lamza, 81, Croatian footballer (Dinamo Zagreb, Châteauroux, Yugoslavia national team).
- Everett Lee, 105, American violinist and conductor.
- Frank Moe, 56, American politician, member of the Minnesota House of Representatives (2005–2008), brain cancer.
- Chu Okongwu, 87, Nigerian economist and politician, minister of finance (1986–1990).
- Iraj Pezeshkzad, 94, Iranian writer (My Uncle Napoleon).
- Waiphot Phetsuphan, 79, Thai luk thung singer.
- Didier Poidyaliwane, 55, New Caledonian politician and pro-independence activist.
- Klara Post, 95, Dutch Olympic gymnast.
- Richard W. Sabers, 83, American jurist, justice of the South Dakota Supreme Court (1986–2008).
- Stephen H. Sachs, 87, American lawyer and politician, U.S. attorney for the District of Maryland (1967–1970) and attorney general of Maryland (1979–1987).
- Meier Schwarz, 95, German-born Israeli plant physiologist.
- Shebby Singh, 61, Malaysian footballer (Johor, Kuala Lumpur, national team), heart attack.
- Adi Andojo Soetjipto, 89, Indonesian jurist and lecturer.
- Ronnie Spector, 78, American Hall of Fame singer (The Ronettes), cancer.
- Stephen J. Stein, 81, American academic and author.
- Sun Bigan, 80, Chinese diplomat, ambassador to Saudi Arabia (1990–1994), Iraq (1994–1998), Iran (1999–2002).
- Taffy Thomas, 76, Welsh jockey.
- Ahmed Touili, 79, Tunisian academic.
- Aminata Touré, 69, Guinean politician, mayor of Kaloum (since 2018).
- Eduard Vaytsyakhovich, 61, Belarusian politician, deputy (1996).
- Geoff Wilson, 82, Australian footballer (Hawthorn).
- George O. Wood, 80, American Pentecostal minister, general superintendent of the Assemblies of God USA (2007–2017), cancer.
- J. Robert Wright, 85, American Episcopalian priest and church historian, complications from COVID-19.
- Joseph Zangerle, 72, Luxembourgish footballer (Union Luxembourg, national team).
- Lisa M. Zurk, 59, American scientist.

=== 13 ===
- Vincent Arcilesi, 89, American painter.
- Joe Babich, 81, New Zealand winemaker.
- Jean-Jacques Beineix, 75, French film director (Diva, Moon in the Gutter, Betty Blue), leukaemia.
- Mario Cámpora, 91, Argentine diplomat, ambassador to the United Kingdom (1990–1994) and Belgium (1995–1999).
- C. Thomas Caskey, 83, American geneticist.
- Rick Cook, 77, American author.
- L. Adrienne Cupples, 77, American epidemiologist and biostatistician, cancer.
- Werner Delmes, 91, German field hockey player, Olympic bronze medalist (1956).
- Israel S. Dresner, 92, American Reform rabbi and civil rights activist, colon cancer.
- Jim Forest, 80, American writer and lay theologian.
- Larry Forgy, 82, American politician.
- Arturo Frei Bolívar, 82, Chilean politician, deputy (1969–1973) and senator (1990–1998).
- Lisa Goddard, 55, American climate scientist, breast cancer.
- Donald Gurnett, 81, American space physicist.
- John Hempel, 86, American mathematician.
- William K. James, 86, American major general.
- Kalamandalam Kuttan Asan, 84, Indian Kathakali artist.
- Leon Lissek, 82, Australian-born British actor (The Sullivans, EastEnders, Time Bandits).
- Ashling Murphy, 23, Irish music teacher and traditional music performer, strangled.
- Cholly Naranjo, 87, Cuban baseball player (Pittsburgh Pirates), complications from COVID-19.
- Darby Nelson, 81, American politician and environmentalist.
- Ann Newmarch, 75, Australian artist.
- Addie Pearl Nicholson, 90, American quilter.
- Fred Parris, 85, American doo-wop singer (The Five Satins).
- Troy Pickard, 48, Australian politician, president of the Australian Local Government Association (2014–2016), mayor of Joondalup (2006–2017).
- Wajeeh Qassim, 83, Palestinian politician and diplomat, ambassador to Morocco (1988–2005).
- S. Ramesan, 69, Indian poet, orator and literary activist.
- Chiara Samugheo, 86, Italian photographer.
- Rudolf Schwemmbauer, 78, German politician.
- Junior Siavii, 43, American football player (Kansas City Chiefs, Dallas Cowboys, Seattle Seahawks).
- Abdul Sajid Tamrin, 69, Indonesian politician, mayor of Baubau (since 2013).
- Lambert Amon Tanoh, 95, Ivorian politician, minister of education (1963–1970), COVID-19.
- Terry Teachout, 65, American playwright and critic (The Wall Street Journal).
- Len Tillem, 77, American attorney and radio broadcaster (KVON, KSRO, KGO).
- Claire Tomlinson, 77, British polo player and coach.
- Sonny Turner, 83, American singer (The Platters), throat cancer.
- Fred Van Hove, 84, Belgian jazz musician.
- Giacomo Vianello, 74, Italian footballer (Como).
- Raúl Vilches, 67, Cuban volleyball player, Olympic bronze medallist (1976), cancer.
- Caroline Wickham-Jones, 66, British archaeologist, amyloidosis.
- Lynn Yeakel, 80, American politician and academic administrator.
- Farrukh Zeynalov, 79, Azerbaijani politician, deputy (2005–2010).

=== 14 ===
- H. P. S. Ahluwalia, 85, Indian mountaineer.
- J. Alexander, 83, Indian civil servant and politician, Karnataka MLA (1999–2004), heart attack.
- Ann Arensberg, 84, American book publishing editor and author, COVID-19.
- Flo Ayres, 98, American radio actress.
- Ricardo Bofill, 82, Spanish architect, founder of Ricardo Bofill Taller de Arquitectura, COVID-19.
- Boris Brozhovsky, 86, Russian cinematographer (The Mysterious Wall, The Cold Summer of 1953, Dreams).
- Maria Aurora Couto, 84, Indian writer and educationalist.
- Leonid Derkach, 82, Ukrainian politician, head of the security service (1998–2001).
- Joe Dunne, 86, British actor and stuntman.
- Jim Fahy, 75, Irish journalist (RTÉ News and Current Affairs).
- Dallas Frazier, 82, American country musician and songwriter ("There Goes My Everything", "All I Have to Offer You (Is Me)", "Elvira").
- Angelo Gilardino, 80, Italian composer, guitarist and musicologist.
- Ron Goulart, 89, American author and comics historian.
- Alice von Hildebrand, 98, Belgian-born American philosopher and theologian.
- Thiago de Mello, 95, Brazilian poet and translator.
- Lol Morgan, 90, English footballer (Rotherham United, Darlington) and manager (Norwich City).
- Fadwa Obeid, 86, Lebanese-American singer.
- Qi Huaiyuan, 92, Chinese diplomat and politician, COVID-19.
- Sean Rice, 49, Canadian figure skater.
- Edward Roberts, 81, Canadian politician, Newfoundland and Labrador MHA (1966–1985, 1992–1996) and lieutenant governor (2002–2006).
- Maoi Roca, 47, Filipino basketball player (Batangas Blades) and actor, complications from diabetes.
- Angelo Rossetto, 75, Italian Olympic rower (1972).
- John Sainsbury, Baron Sainsbury of Preston Candover, 94, British businessman and politician, chairman of Sainsbury's (1969–1992) and member of the House of Lords (since 1989).
- Malladi Chandrasekhara Sastry, 96, Indian Vedic scholar.
- Paolo Schiavocampo, 97, Italian painter and sculptor.
- Peter Seabrook, 86, British gardening writer and television broadcaster, heart attack.
- Bill Seward, 63, American broadcaster, cancer.
- Jaswant Singh, 90, Indian field hockey player, Olympic silver medallist (1960).
- Carol Speed, 76, American actress (Abby, Disco Godfather, Dynamite Brothers).
- Anastasia Voznesenskaya, 78, Russian actress (Major Whirlwind, The Garage, Station for Two), COVID-19.
- Kameshwar C. Wali, 94, Indian-born American physicist.
- Dave Wolverton, 64, American writer (The Runelords), fall.
- Yuri Zhuravlyov, 87, Russian mathematician.

=== 15 ===
- Slim Andrews, 90, American country musician, cancer.
- Rink Babka, 85, American discus thrower, Olympic silver medallist (1960).
- Amit Bhardwaj, 38, Indian businessman and convicted fraudster, cardiac arrest.
- Marlon Bundo, 8–9, American rabbit and book subject (A Day in the Life of Marlon Bundo, Marlon Bundo's A Day in the Life of the Vice President).
- Ebrahim Buzhu, 52, Dutch drug trafficker, shot.
- Nino Cerruti, 91, Italian stylist, founder of Cerruti 1881, complications from hip surgery.
- Ed Cheff, 78, American college baseball coach (Lewis–Clark State College).
- Claire D. Clarke, American politician, member of the New Hampshire House of Representatives (2001–2011).
- Paul Cooper, 94, Hong Kong Olympic sailor (1964, 1968).
- Dan Einstein, 61, American record producer, Grammy winner (1987, 1988).
- Ralph Emery, 88, American Hall of Fame disc jockey and television host.
- Michelle Go, 40, American financial advisor, struck by train.
- Michelle Grangaud, 80, Algerian-born French poet.
- Daniel Guerrero, 76, Argentine actor (Yo Se Que Mentia), pulmonary embolism.
- Joe B. Hall, 93, American Hall of Fame basketball coach (Kentucky Wildcats).
- Jane-Howard Hammerstein, 87, American screenwriter (Wait Until Dark, Summer of My German Soldier, Long Road Home).
- Paul Hinshelwood, 65, English footballer (Crystal Palace).
- Bernard Ryosuke Inagaki, 93, Japanese philosopher and scholar, stomach cancer.
- Michael Jackson, 87, British-American Hall of Fame talk radio host (KABC, KGIL), complications from Parkinson's disease.
- Erwin Jaisli, 84, Swiss Olympic cyclist (1960, 1964).
- Stephen Kovacs, 50, American saber fencer and coach.
- Jon Lind, 73, American songwriter ("Save the Best for Last", "Crazy for You") and musician, cancer.
- Jean-Claude Lord, 78, Canadian film director (Deliver Us from Evil, Toby McTeague, Tadpole and the Whale) and screenwriter, stroke.
- Aurora del Mar, 87, Argentine actress (Aquellos años locos, Había una vez un circo, Crazy Women).
- Robert E. McCarthy, 82, American politician, member of the Massachusetts House of Representatives (1971–1975) and Senate (1975–1981).
- Alexa McDonough, 77, Canadian politician, Nova Scotia MLA (1981–1995) and MP (1997–2003), complications from Alzheimer's disease.
- John McIndoe, 87, British Church of Scotland minister, moderator of the General Assembly (1996–1997).
- Pete Newbon, 38, British academic and anti-racism activist, suicide by jumping.
- Félix Ormazabal, 81, Spanish politician, member of the Basque parliament (1980, 1984–1995).
- Scot Palmer, 84, Australian sports journalist.
- Robert Péri, 80, French footballer (Bordeaux, FC Metz, Toulon).
- Quarto Pianesi, 81, Italian Olympic field hockey player (1960), COVID-19.
- Beverly Ross, 87, American musician (Ronald & Ruby) and songwriter ("Lollipop", "The Girl of My Best Friend"), dementia.
- Ramazan Rragami, 77, Albanian football player (Vllaznia Shkodër, Partizani Tirana, national team) and manager.
- Michel Ruhl, 87, French actor (Death of a Corrupt Man, Wild Reeds).
- María Cristina Sangri Aguilar, 81, Mexican politician, deputy (1985–1991).
- Steve Schapiro, 87, American photojournalist, pancreatic cancer.
- David Schumacher, 90, Australian Olympic wrestler (1956).
- Nazim Hussain Siddiqui, 81, Pakistani politician and lawyer, Chief Justice (2003–2005).
- Tong Wai Ki, 82, Hong Kong politician, member of the People's PCC (2008–2013).
- Hossein Valamanesh, 72, Iranian-Australian artist, heart attack.
- Andrew P. Vayda, 90, Hungarian-born American anthropologist.
- Reidar Webster, 87, Norwegian civil servant, state conciliator (1988–2004).
- Norma Wilson, 92, Australian cricketer.

=== 16 ===
- Ibrahim Ashk, 70, Indian poet and lyricist, complications from COVID-19.
- Jaco Azafrani, 89, Spanish football player (UD España, Rayo Vallecano) and manager (San Fernando).
- Francis Bazire, 82, French Olympic cyclist (1964).
- Tova Berlinski, 106, Polish-born Israeli painter.
- Ethan Blackaby, 81, American baseball player (Milwaukee Braves).
- Morton J. Blumenthal, 90, American politician, member of the Connecticut House of Representatives (1971–1975).
- Michael Brecher, 96, Canadian political scientist.
- Rocco J. Carzo, 89, American football (Tufts) and lacrosse coach (Delaware).
- William Cochran, 78, American opera singer.
- Frederick R. Cohen, 76, American mathematician.
- Carmela Corren, 83, Israeli singer ("Vielleicht geschieht ein Wunder") and actress (His Best Friend, Don't Fool with Me).
- William Daley, 96, American ceramist and academic.
- Brian DeLunas, 46, American baseball coach (Seattle Mariners, Missouri Tigers), kidney disease.
- Shanti Devi, 87, Indian social worker.
- Rod Driver, 89, British-born American mathematician and politician, member of the Rhode Island House of Representatives (1987–1995, 2009–2011).
- Bas Edixhoven, 59, Dutch mathematician and academic.
- Sten Elliot, 96, Swedish Olympic sailor (1960).
- Bruce Erickson, 88, American paleontologist.
- Alekos Fassianos, 86, Greek painter.
- Richard J. Ferris, 85, American business executive (United Airlines Limited), complications from amyotrophic lateral sclerosis.
- Kevin Flynn, 82, Irish rugby union player (Wanderers, national team).
- Françoise Forton, 64, Brazilian actress (Estúpido Cupido, Tieta).
- Bob Gajda, 81, American bodybuilder.
- John Rice Irwin, 91, American cultural historian, founder of the Museum of Appalachia.
- Ibrahim Boubacar Keïta, 76, Malian politician, president (2013–2020), prime minister (1994–2000) and president of the National Assembly (2002–2007).
- Tafazzal Hossain Khan, 101, Bangladeshi jurist and politician, MP (1979–1982), pneumonia.
- Birju Maharaj, 83, Indian Kathak dancer, heart attack.
- Charles McGee, 102, American fighter pilot (Tuskegee Airmen).
- Shaoli Mitra, 74, Indian playwright and actress (Jukti Takko Aar Gappo).
- Lucienne Moreau, 88, French actress.
- Andrei Mudrea, 67, Moldovan painter and plastic artist.
- Paul Myners, Baron Myners, 73, British politician, member of the House of Lords (since 2008).
- Georges Pelletier, 82, Canadian doctor.
- Alleppey Ranganath, 72, Indian composer (Pappan Priyappetta Pappan, Captain), film director and screenwriter (Ambadi Thannilorunni), COVID-19.
- Jill Robb, 87, English-born Australian film producer and executive.
- Shizuo Satō, 90, Japanese politician, councillor (1992–1998), heart attack.
- Thomas T. Sekine, 88, Japanese economist.
- Jeremy Sivits, 42, American military policeman and convicted war criminal, COVID-19.
- Jamie Vincent, 46, English footballer (Bournemouth, Portsmouth, Swindon Town), heart attack.
- Gale Wade, 92, American baseball player (Chicago Cubs).
- Rabia Zuberi, 81, Pakistani sculptor, founder of the Karachi School of Art.

=== 17 ===
- Carlos Mario Álvarez, 54, Colombian politician, mayor of Armenia (2016–2018).
- Rolf Bock, 85, German football manager (Borussia Dortmund, Rot-Weiss Essen), cancer.
- Oliver Braddick, 77, British developmental psychologist.
- Jonathan Brown, 82, American art historian.
- Juan Caviglia, 92, Argentine Olympic gymnast (1952, 1960).
- Tulivu-Donna Cumberbatch, 71, American jazz singer.
- Jackie Fisher, 96, English footballer (Millwall, Bournemouth).
- Armando Gama, 67, Portuguese singer-songwriter ("Esta balada que te dou").
- Edward Irons, 98, American economist, heart disease.
- Bill Jackson, 86, American television personality (The BJ and Dirty Dragon Show, Gigglesnort Hotel), complications from COVID-19.
- Dean Jaensch, 85, Australian political scientist.
- Michel Konen, 70, Belgian journalist.
- Björn Natthiko Lindeblad, 60, Swedish economist and Buddhist monk, assisted suicide.
- Benoît Lwamba, 76, Congolese magistrate, president of the Court of Cassation (2015–2020).
- Gilbert S. Merritt Jr., 86, American lawyer and jurist, U.S. attorney for the Middle District of Tennessee (1966–1969), judge (since 1977) and chief judge (1989–1996) of the U.S. Court of Appeals for the Sixth Circuit.
- Joseph M. Minard, 90, American politician, member of the West Virginia Senate (1990–1994, 1998–2013).
- Rasheed Naz, 73, Pakistani actor (Qayamat – A Love Triangle In Afghanistan, Khuda Kay Liye, Baby).
- Stan Neilly, 79, Australian politician, NSW MLA (1981–1988, 1991–1999).
- Merrill Newman, 93, American army officer.
- Keiji Nishikawa, 60, Japanese shogi player.
- Patricia Kenworthy Nuckols, 100, American Hall of Fame field hockey player (national team) and WASP pilot.
- Karim Ouellet, 37, Senegalese-born Canadian singer-songwriter.
- M. K. Prasad, 89, Indian environmentalist, COVID-19.
- Balram Singh Rai, 100, Guyanese politician, minister of home affairs (1961–1962). (death announced on this date)
- Roger Samuels, 61, American baseball player (Pittsburgh Pirates, San Francisco Giants), cancer.
- Mihir Sengupta, 75, Indian writer.
- Raima Islam Shimu, Bangladeshi actress. (body discovered on this date)
- Michel Subor, 86, French actor (Le petit soldat, Topaz, Beau Travail), traffic collision.
- Ronald G. Tompkins, 70, American physician and academic.
- Jennifer Toye, 88, British opera singer.
- Hale Trotter, 90, Canadian-American mathematician.
- Vaʻai Papu Vailupe, 77, Samoan politician, MP (1991–2001, 2006–2011) and minister of justice (1996–1998).
- Neela Wickramasinghe, 71, Sri Lankan singer, heart attack.

=== 18 ===
- Lorenzo Alocén, 84, Spanish Olympic basketball player (1968).
- Hilario Candela, 87, Cuban-born American architect, COVID-19.
- Sir David Cox, 97, British statistician (Cox process, Point Processes).
- Narayan Debnath, 96, Indian cartoonist (Handa Bhonda, Bantul the Great, Nonte Phonte).
- Guillaume Domingue, 36, Mauritian radio broadcaster.
- Fanita English, 105, Romanian-born American psychoanalyst.
- Burton M. Fine, 89, American politician, member of the New York State Assembly (1961–1965).
- Dave Finney, 88, American politician, member of the Texas House of Representatives (1962–1977).
- Ron Franklin, 79, American sportscaster (ESPN), complications from COVID-19.
- Paco Gento, 88, Spanish football player (Real Madrid, national team) and manager (Granada).
- Dick Halligan, 78, American musician (Blood, Sweat & Tears) and film composer (Go Tell the Spartans, Fear City), Grammy winner (1970).
- Lusia Harris, 66, American Hall of Fame basketball player (Delta State Lady Statesmen, Houston Angels), Olympic silver medalist (1976).
- Paavo Heininen, 84, Finnish composer and pianist.
- Freddie Hughes, 78, American gospel and soul singer, complications from leukemia and COVID-19.
- G. V. Kromah, 68, Liberian journalist, politician, and warlord.
- Michelangelo La Neve, 62, Italian comics writer (Dylan Dog, Martin Mystère) and screenwriter (Diabolik).
- Jean Laborde, 99, French resistant and politician, deputy (1977–1995).
- Ankica Lepej, 73–74, Croatian whistleblower, COVID-19.
- Tito Matos, 53, Puerto Rican requinto player, heart attack.
- Paddy Mendis, 88, Sri Lankan aviator, commander of the air force (1971–1976).
- Jordan Michallet, 29, French rugby union player (FC Grenoble, CS Bourgoin-Jallieu, Rouen Normandie Rugby), suicide by jumping.
- Alberto Michelotti, 91, Italian Hall of Fame football referee and player (Fidenza).
- Arnold Mickens, 49, American football player (Indianapolis Colts).
- Yvette Mimieux, 80, American actress (The Time Machine, The Black Hole, Jackson County Jail).
- Anatoliy Novikov, 75, Ukrainian judoka, Olympic bronze medalist (1972).
- Arvid Nyberg, 93, Norwegian politician, mayor of Trysil Municipality (1972–1999).
- Jan Økern, 69, Norwegian business executive.
- David L. Paul, 82, American banker (CenTrust Bank), real estate developer and convicted fraudster, complications from COVID-19.
- Don Pepot, 88, Filipino comedian, actor (Hee-Man: Master of None, My Bugoy Goes to Congress, Enteng the Dragon) and radio host, COVID-19.
- Donald Philbrick, 87, American politician, member of the New Hampshire House of Representatives (1993–2007).
- Elio Pietrini, 83, Argentine-Venezuelan actor (Abigail, Amores de fin de siglo, Destino de Mujer), COVID-19.
- Manoel Henriques Ribeiro, 76, Brazilian politician, mayor of Manaus (1986–1988).
- Peter Robbins, 65, American actor (Peanuts, Blondie, A Ticklish Affair), suicide.
- Badal Roy, 82, Indian tabla player, percussionist and recording artist, COVID-19.
- Vic Roznovsky, 83, American baseball player (Chicago Cubs, Baltimore Orioles, Philadelphia Phillies).
- Eliezer Schweid, 92, Israeli philosopher.
- Stepan Shalaev, 93, Russian politician, chairman of the All-Union Central Council of Trade Unions (1982–1990).
- Shi Jiuyong, 95, Chinese jurist, judge (1994–2010) and president (2003–2006) of the International Court of Justice.
- Jan Smith, 76, American Olympic speed skater (1964), complications from a stroke.
- André Leon Talley, 73, American fashion journalist (Vogue), complications from a heart attack and COVID-19.
- Eloy Tato Losada, 98, Spanish-born Colombian Roman Catholic prelate, bishop of Magangué (1969–1994).

=== 19 ===
- Tommy Angell, 97, American Olympic fencer (1964).
- Yevgeny Aryeh, 74, Israeli theater director, playwright, and set designer.
- Bill Beeny, 95, American Baptist minister.
- Sonya Biddle, 64, Canadian actress (Rebel High, Snake Eater II: The Drug Buster, The Bone Collector) and politician.
- Alica Bieliková, 79, Slovak politician, member of the National Council (1994–1998).
- Antonio Borrometi, 68, Italian politician, deputy (1996–2001).
- Leland Byrd, 94, American basketball player, coach and athletics administrator (Western Michigan Broncos, West Virginia Mountaineers).
- Nancy Devlin, 92, American educational psychologist, stroke.
- Hans-Jürgen Dörner, 70, German football player (Dynamo Dresden, East Germany national team) and manager (Werder Bremen), Olympic champion (1976).
- Dan Dworsky, 94, American architect and football player (Michigan Wolverines).
- Nils Arne Eggen, 80, Norwegian football player (Vålerenga, national team) and manager (Rosenborg).
- Elmar Fischer, 85, Austrian Roman Catholic prelate, bishop of Feldkirch (2005–2011), COVID-19.
- Kirsten Fründt, 54, German politician.
- Antonina Girycz, 82, Polish actress (Katastrofa, Hunting Flies, A Woman's Decision).
- Bob Goalby, 92, American golfer, Masters winner (1968).
- Stanisław Grędziński, 76, Polish Olympic sprinter (1968), European champion (1966).
- Qazi Anwar Hussain, 85, Bangladeshi writer (Masud Rana).
- Kenneth Norman Jones, 97, Australian public servant.
- Michael Jones, 79, Canadian new-age pianist and composer.
- David Karpeles, 86, American mathematician and philanthropist.
- Haig Kazazian, 84, American geneticist, heart failure.
- Fraser Kelly, 87, Canadian journalist and broadcaster.
- Hardy Krüger, 93, German actor (Barry Lyndon, A Bridge Too Far, The Wild Geese) and author.
- Richard Liversedge, 81, British Olympic luger (1968, 1972, 1976).
- Anatoly Malofeyev, 88, Belarusian politician, speaker of the House of Representatives (1997–2002) and member of the Politburo (1990–1991).
- Gloria McMillan, 88, American actress (Our Miss Brooks).
- Tom Mount, 82, American diver.
- Aleksandr Nazarenko, 74, Russian historian, COVID-19.
- Pan Ziqiang, 85, Chinese engineer, member of the Chinese Academy of Engineering.
- Marcus Reichert, 73, American painter, photographer, and film director.
- Nigel Rogers, 86, English tenor.
- Rafael Rojas, 59, Mexican operatic tenor.
- Wilho Saari, 89, American musician.
- Mohan Prasad Sharma, 87, Nepalese jurist, chief justice of the Supreme Court (1998–1999).
- Lyman F. Sheats Jr., 55, American pinball designer, suicide.
- Billy Taylor, 69, British Olympic boxer (1972).
- Gaspard Ulliel, 37, French actor (Hannibal Rising, Saint Laurent, It's Only the End of the World), César winner (2017), skiing accident.
- Jamye Coleman Williams, 103, American activist.
- Brian Whittingham, 71, Scottish writer.

=== 20 ===
- Sir Martin Berthoud, 90, British diplomat, high commissioner to Trinidad and Tobago (1985–1991).
- Heidi Biebl, 80, German alpine skier, Olympic champion (1960).
- Bobs Worth, 16, Irish racehorse.
- Gernot Böhme, 85, German philosopher and author.
- Randy Boyd, 59, Canadian ice hockey player (Pittsburgh Penguins, New York Islanders, Vancouver Canucks).
- David Bramwell, 79, British botanist.
- Bernardo Caraballo, 87, Colombian boxer, heart disease.
- Athan Catjakis, 90, American politician, member of the Massachusetts House of Representatives (1985–1993).
- José Augusto Curvo, 72, Brazilian politician, deputy (1991–1995, 2016), complications from COVID-19.
- Frank Dutton, 72, South African police officer.
- Eduardo Flores, 77, Argentine footballer (Estudiantes), cancer.
- Carla Galle, 73, Belgian Olympic swimmer (1968).
- Ron Grey, 91, Australian senior army officer and Commissioner of the Federal Police (1983–1988).
- Gary W. Johnston, 57, American major general.
- Benjamin Kogo, 77, Kenyan steeplechase runner, Olympic silver medalist (1968), prostate cancer.
- Hattie Ladbury, 47, British actress (Mrs Brown), cancer.
- Sergio Lepri, 102, Italian journalist, director of ANSA (1961–1990).
- Emil Mangelsdorff, 96, German jazz musician.
- Alan Gray Martin, 91, Canadian politician.
- Meat Loaf, 74, American singer ("Two Out of Three Ain't Bad", "I'd Do Anything for Love") and actor (The Rocky Horror Picture Show), complications from COVID-19.
- Juro Mětšk, 67, German composer.
- Sidney August Anthony Miller Jr., 89, American music executive, complications from COVID-19.
- Camillo Milli, 92, Italian actor (Fantozzi subisce ancora, L'allenatore nel pallone, Il Marchese del Grillo), complications from COVID-19.
- Domingo Miras, 87, Spanish dramatist.
- Klaus Peter Möller, 84, German politician, member (1977–2003) and president (1988–1991, 1995–2003) of the Landtag of Hesse.
- Hideo Onchi, 88, Japanese film director (Warabi no kō), lung cancer.
- Popcorn Deelites, 23, American racehorse and animal actor (Seabiscuit), colic.
- René Robert, 85, Swiss-born French photographer, hypothermia.
- Clyde Sanger, 93, British-Canadian journalist and author.
- Egon Schübeler, 94, German politician, member of the Landtag of Schleswig-Holstein (1967–1987).
- Elza Soares, 91, Brazilian singer.
- Earl Swensson, 91, American architect (AT&T Building, Gaylord Opryland Resort & Convention Center).
- Donald Serrell Thomas, 87, British crime fiction writer.
- Karolos Trikolidis, 74, Austrian conductor.
- Sam Wetzel, 91, American lieutenant general.
- Kostiantyn Yastrub, 86, Ukrainian politician, chairman of the Cherkasy Oblast Council (1991–1992).
- Irwin Young, 94, American film stock businessman.

=== 21 ===
- Louie Anderson, 68, American comedian, actor (Life with Louie, Baskets), and game show host (Family Feud), Emmy winner (1997, 1998, 2016), large B-cell lymphoma.
- Brown Ayres, 90, American politician.
- Rex Cawley, 81, American hurdler, Olympic champion (1964) and men's 400 meter hurdles world record-holder (1964–1968).
- Romualdo Coviello, 81, Italian politician, senator (1987–2006).
- Felicia Donceanu, 90, Romanian painter, sculptor, and composer.
- James Forbes, 69, American basketball player, Olympic silver medalist (1972), complications from COVID-19.
- Francesco Paolo Fulci, 90, Italian diplomat, ambassador to the United Nations (1993–1999).
- Krzysztof Gawedzki, 74, Polish-French mathematical physicist.
- Clark Gillies, 67, Canadian Hall of Fame ice hockey player (New York Islanders, Buffalo Sabres), four-time Stanley Cup champion.
- G. William Hamilton, 88, American politician, member of the Vermont House of Representatives (1973–1975, 1977–1983).
- Bill Harrington, 95, American baseball player (Kansas City Athletics).
- William Higgins, 79, American tennis player.
- Joyce Holden, 91, American actress (The Milkman, Iron Man, Bronco Buster).
- Donal Hurley, 85, Irish Gaelic footballer and hurler.
- Edwilda Gustava Allen Isaac, 84, American civil rights activist.
- Jean Jamin, 76, French ethnologist and anthropologist.
- Arnie Kantrowitz, 81, American LGBT activist and author, complications from COVID-19.
- Aftab Ahmed Khan, 81, Indian police officer, founder of the Anti-Terrorism Squad, post-COVID-19 pneumonia.
- Sharon Kinne, 82, American murderer and prison escapee.
- Czesław Krakowski, 71, Polish politician, senator (1993–1997).
- Harry Kurschat, 91, German boxer, Olympic silver medalist (1956).
- Arlo U. Landolt, 86, American astronomer.
- Arnis Līcītis, 76, Latvian actor (The Favorite, Aquanauts, The Fairfax Millions).
- Adolfo Lugo Verduzco, 88, Mexican politician, president of PRI (1982–1986), senator (1982–1987) and governor of Hidalgo (1987–1993).
- Elsa Malpartida, 60, Peruvian politician, member of the Andean Parliament (2006–2011).
- Marcel Mauron, 92, Swiss footballer (FC La Chaux-de-Fonds, national team).
- Valentin Mazikin, 76, Russian politician and volleyball administrator (VC Kuzbass Kemerovo).
- David McGill, 75, Scottish lawn bowler.
- Fred Moore, 99, Australian miner and trade unionist.
- Anatoly Naiman, 85, Russian poet, translator, and writer.
- Mace Neufeld, 93, American film producer (The Hunt for Red October, Invictus, The Equalizer).
- Tatyana Nikolayeva, 102, Russian politician.
- Axel Nikulásson, 59, Icelandic basketball player (Keflavík, Grindavík, KR) and coach.
- Leonor Oyarzún, 102, Chilean family therapist, first lady (1990–1994).
- Jean-Luc Parodi, 84, French political scientist.
- Robert Phillips, 83, American poet and academic.
- Howard Radford, 91, Welsh footballer (Bristol Rovers).
- Robert Russell Reid, 94, Canadian artist.
- Hal Sadler, 91, American architect.
- Petro Sardachuk, 83, Ukrainian diplomat, ambassador to Slovakia (1993–1994), Poland (1994–1998) and Finland (2001–2003).
- Haim Shahal, 99, Israeli naval engineer.
- Dennis Smith, 81, American writer and firefighter, complications from COVID-19.
- Arthur Tarnow, 79, American jurist, judge of the U.S. District Court for Eastern Michigan (since 1998), heart disease.
- Terry Tolkin, 62, American music journalist and music executive (Elektra Records, Touch and Go Records, No. 6 Records).
- Mario Trafeli, 93, American speed skater.
- Antonino Valletta, 83, Italian politician, senator (1994–2001).
- Billy Waddy, 67, American football player (Los Angeles Rams, Minnesota Vikings).
- Gerald Weiß, 76, German politician, MP (1998–2009).
- Kohei Yoshiyuki, 76, Japanese photographer.
- Zhang Jie, 84, Chinese novelist.

=== 22 ===
- Emilbek Abakirov, 92, Kyrgyz politician.
- Denise Allen, 68, Australian politician, Victorian MLA (2000–2002), cancer.
- Ron Arnold, 84, American writer and artist.
- Judy Banks, 86, Australian television presenter (Fredd Bear's Breakfast-A-Go-Go).
- Hartmut Becker, 83, German actor (Escape from Sobibor, o.k., He Who Loves in a Glass House).
- Subhash Bhowmick, 71, Indian football player (East Bengal, Mohun Bagan, national team) and manager, kidney disease.
- Billy the Artist, 57, American artist, complications from colon cancer.
- Jimmy Campbell, 84, Irish fiddler.
- Marc Crousillat, 62, French Olympic water polo player (1988).
- Gianni Di Marzio, 82, Italian football manager (Napoli, Catania, Catanzaro).
- Rasmi Djabrailov, 89, Russian actor (Lăutarii, Drama from Ancient Life, The Return of the Battleship) and stage director.
- Pierre Escourrou, 84, French rugby league player (AS Carcassonne, national team).
- Raphaël Esrail, 96, Turkish-born French resistance member and engineer, cancer.
- Andrew Ezergailis, 91, Latvian-born American historian, complications from Parkinson's disease.
- René Gagnon, 93, Canadian painter, cancer.
- Benjamin Harrison, 93, American major general.
- Johan Hultin, 97, Swedish-born American pathologist.
- Robert Jashari, 83, Albanian football player (Partizani Tirana, national team) and manager (Kastrioti).
- Kathryn Kates, 73, American actress (The Many Saints of Newark, Law & Order: Special Victims Unit, Shades of Blue), lung cancer.
- Katuutire Kaura, 80, Namibian politician, MP (1990–2015).
- Colm Keane, 70, Irish journalist (RTÉ Radio 1), cancer.
- Walt McDonald, 87, American poet.
- Craig McGregor, 88, Australian journalist.
- Ralph Natale, 86, American mobster (Philadelphia crime family).
- Agripino Núñez Collado, 88, Dominican Roman Catholic clergyman and scholar, rector of the Pontificia Universidad Católica Madre y Maestra (1970–2015).
- Phyllis E. Oakley, 87, American diplomat, assistant secretary of state for population, refugees and migration (1994–1997).
- Hugo Ott, 90, German historian and academic.
- Bill Owens, 84, American politician, member of the Massachusetts Senate (1975–1982, 1989–1992), COVID-19.
- António Lima Pereira, 69, Portuguese footballer (Porto, Maia, national team).
- Tuomo Polvinen, 90, Finnish historian, chief of the National Archives (1970–1974).
- Emerich Roth, 97, Slovak-born Swedish Holocaust survivor and writer.
- Clive Sarstedt, 78, British pop singer ("My Resistance Is Low") and musician, heart attack.
- Patrick Shai, 65, South African actor (Red Scorpion, Schweitzer, Generations), suicide by hanging.
- Kirti Shiledar, 69, Indian classical singer.
- Sverre Stensheim, 88, Norwegian Olympic cross-country skier (1960, 1964).
- Thích Nhất Hạnh, 95, Vietnamese Zen Buddhist monk (The Art of Communicating, Love Letter to the Earth), co-founder of Plum Village Monastery.
- Michael Thornhill, 80, Australian film producer, screenwriter, and director (Between Wars, The FJ Holden, The Everlasting Secret Family).
- Roger Wallis, 80, British-Swedish journalist and radio presenter.
- Alon Wieland, 86, American politician, member of the North Dakota House of Representatives (2003–2014).
- Don Wilson, 88, American guitarist (The Ventures).
- Joe Yukica, 90, American college football player and coach (Boston College Eagles, Dartmouth Big Green, New Hampshire Wildcats).

=== 23 ===
- Beegie Adair, 84, American jazz pianist.
- William Álvarez, 87, Colombian-Spanish tennis player and coach.
- Kenes Aukhadiev, 83, Kazakh politician.
- Antonio Benítez, 79, Spanish football player and coach (Málaga).
- Edgar S. Cahn, 86, American law professor and counsel.
- Renato Cecchetto, 70, Italian actor (Parenti serpenti, Fracchia la belva umana, Pierino colpisce ancora) and voice actor, traffic collision.
- Marie-Claire Chevalier, 66, French abortion rights activist.
- Noel Corngold, 93, American physicist.
- Jay Cowan, 75, American-born Canadian politician, Manitoba MLA (1977–1990).
- Narciso Debourg, 96, Venezuelan sculptor.
- Božidar Đurašević, 88, Serbian chess player.
- Maiquel Falcão, 40, Brazilian mixed martial artist, stabbed.
- Enzo Fasano, 70, Italian politician, deputy (2001–2006, since 2018), cancer.
- Doc Faustina, 82, American racing driver.
- Trude Feldman, 97, American journalist (The New York Times, The Washington Post), member of the White House Press Corps.
- Greta Ferušić, 97, Bosnian architect and academic, survivor of Auschwitz and the Siege of Sarajevo.
- Guo Shuyan, 86, Chinese politician, governor of Hubei (1990–1993).
- Ezra Kanoho, 94, American politician, member of the Hawaii House of Representatives (1987–2006), heart failure.
- Hiroyuki Konishi, 85, Japanese politician, councilor (1980–1992).
- Serge Korber, 85, French film director (An Idiot in Paris, A Little Virtuous, L'homme orchestre) and screenwriter.
- Barbara Krafftówna, 93, Polish actress (Tonight a City Will Die, How to Be Loved, The Saragossa Manuscript).
- Keto Losaberidze, 72, Georgian archer, Olympic champion (1980).
- Lourdes Maldonado López, 52, Mexican journalist, shot.
- Jean-Claude Mézières, 83, French comic book artist (Valérian and Laureline).
- Bruce Miller, 99, New Zealand soil chemist and scientific administrator.
- Thierry Mugler, 73, French fashion designer.
- Baillieu Myer, 96, Australian businessman and philanthropist.
- R. Nagaswamy, 91, Indian historian, archaeologist and epigraphist.
- Osea Naiqamu, 60, Fijian politician, MP (since 2014).
- Carlo Parietti, 71, Italian journalist and trade unionist.
- Roberto Romulo, 83, Filipino businessman and diplomat, secretary of foreign affairs (1992–1995).
- Guy Saint-Pierre, 87, Canadian politician and businessman, Quebec MNA (1970–1976).
- Larry Salmans, 84, American politician, member of the Kansas Senate (1997–2005).
- Janet Scott, 57, South African chemist.
- Alan A. Stone, 92, American lecturer and psychologist, laryngeal cancer.
- Ralph Thompson, 93, Jamaican poet.
- Armido Torri, 83, Italian Olympic rower (1960).
- Lavrentije Trifunović, 86, Serbian Orthodox prelate, eparch of Western Europe (1973–1989) and Šabac (since 1989).
- Emmanuel Tumusiime-Mutebile, 72, Ugandan economist and banker, governor of the Bank of Uganda (since 2001), complications from diabetes.
- Zofia Walasek, 89, Polish Olympic middle-distance runner (1960).
- Glyndwr Williams, 89, British historian.
- Rolf Zehetbauer, 92, German production designer (Cabaret, The NeverEnding Story, Das Boot), Oscar winner (1973).

=== 24 ===
- Theresa Amayo, 88, Brazilian actress (S.O.S. Mulheres ao Mar, The Pilgrim).
- John Arrillaga, 84, American real estate developer and philanthropist.
- Aftab Baloch, 68, Pakistani cricketer (national team).
- Tadeusz Bradecki, 67, Polish actor (Camera Buff, The Constant Factor, Schindler's List) and stage director.
- Olavo de Carvalho, 74, Brazilian polemicist and conspiracy theorist, COVID-19.
- Szilveszter Csollány, 51, Hungarian gymnast, Olympic champion (2000), COVID-19.
- Richard Slator Dunn, 93, American historian and author.
- Constance Edjeani-Afenu, Ghanaian military officer.
- Ron Esau, 67, American racing driver.
- Ronnie Fearn, Baron Fearn, 90, British politician, MP (1987–1992, 1997–2001), member of the House of Lords (2001–2018).
- Alma Speed Fox, 98, American civil rights activist.
- Fatma Girik, 79, Turkish actress (Karakolda Ayna Var, Kız Kolunda Damga Var, Seviştiğimiz Günler), complications from COVID-19.
- Silvia Gmür, 82, Swiss architect.
- Rod Humenuik, 83, American football player (Winnipeg Blue Bombers) and coach (New England Patriots, Cleveland Browns).
- Tomoo Ishii, 98, Japanese golfer.
- Hubertus Kramer, 62, German politician, member of the Landtag of North Rhine-Westphalia (since 2005).
- Miriam Naor, 74, Israeli jurist, president of the Supreme Court (2015–2017).
- Felix Neuhaus, 93, Swiss Olympic wrestler (1952).
- Sally Olsen, 87, American politician, member of the Minnesota House of Representatives (1979–1992).
- Stevan K. Pavlowitch, 88, Serbian-born British historian.
- Ayberk Pekcan, 51, Turkish actor (Mustang, Winter Sleep), lung cancer.
- Osvaldo Peredo, 91, Argentine tango singer.
- Joaquim Amado Quevedo, 75, Brazilian politician, mayor of Tatuí (1983–1987, 1993–1996).
- Ghulam Noor Rabbani Khar, 74, Pakistani politician, MNA (2013–2018).
- Sheldon Silver, 77, American politician, member (1977–2015) and speaker (1994–2015) of the New York State Assembly.
- Arnaud Spire, 82, French journalist (L'Humanité).
- Borislav Stevanović, 46, Serbian footballer (Radnički Niš, Rad, BASK).
- Mark Thomas, 90, American flutist.

=== 25 ===
- Ekundayo Adeyinka Adeyemi, 84, Nigerian academic and architect.
- Martin Barooshian, 92, American painter.
- Judd Bernard, 94, American film producer (Double Trouble, Blue, The Marseille Contract).
- Héctor Borda, 94–95, Bolivian politician, anthropologist, and poet, member of the Chamber of Senators (1982–1985).
- Margaret Gillies Brown, 92, Scottish poet.
- Wyn Calvin, 96, Welsh comedian and entertainer.
- Svetlana Căpățînă, 52, Moldovan politician, deputy (since 2021), complications from COVID-19.
- Etchika Choureau, 92, French actress (Children of Love, A Girl from Paris, Darby's Rangers).
- Jean-Claude Corbeil, 89, Canadian linguist and lexicographer.
- Barry Cryer, 86, English comedian (I'm Sorry I Haven't a Clue) and screenwriter (Doctor in the House).
- Hardev Dilgir, 82, Indian lyricist ("Tere Tille Ton"), heart attack.
- Erwin Eisch, 94, German artist.
- David Green, 61, Nicaraguan baseball player (St. Louis Cardinals, San Francisco Giants), respiratory failure.
- Vladimir Gubarev, 83, Russian writer and journalist.
- Toshiko Hayashi, 81, Japanese politician, complications from amyotrophic lateral sclerosis.
- Bill Hodgson, 77, Canadian curler.
- Wim Jansen, 75, Dutch football player (Feyenoord, national team) and manager (Celtic), assisted suicide.
- Mirza Khan, 97, Pakistani Olympic hurdler (1952).
- Pat King, 77–78, Scottish bassist (Manfred Mann's Earth Band).
- Gerald Lewis, 87, American politician.
- David Elliot Loye, 96, American author and psychologist.
- Donald Mahler, 88, American ballet dancer, choreographer and stage director.
- Kyoko Matsuoka, 86, Japanese librarian and translator.
- Ramón Martínez, 73, Venezuelan politician, senator (1998–2000) and governor of Sucre (1992–1998, 2000–2008), COVID-19.
- David G. Mugar, 82, American businessman and philanthropist.
- Bill Needham, 90, Canadian ice hockey player (Grand Rapids Rockets, Toledo Hornets) and coach (Cleveland Crusaders).
- Joseph T. O'Neill, 90, American politician, member of the Minnesota House of Representatives (1967–1971) and Senate (1971–1977).
- Edna O'Shaughnessy, 97, South African-born British psychoanalyst.
- Ozzie, 60, African-born American western lowland gorilla, oldest male gorilla in captivity.
- Dojčin Perazić, 76, Montenegrin footballer (Red Star Belgrade, Vojvodina, FC Den Haag).
- Andy Ross, 65, British music executive.
- José Ruiz Baos, 75, Spanish bullfighter, complications from a stroke.
- Milena Salvini, 88, Italian-born French Kathakali dancer.
- Ann Schonberger, 81, American educator.
- Gert Schutte, 82, Dutch politician, MP (1981–2001).
- Richard Stearns, 94, American sailor, Olympic silver medalist (1964).
- Sir Crispin Tickell, 91, British environmentalist and diplomat, permanent representative to the United Nations (1987–1990), pneumonia.
- Esteban Torres, 91, American politician, member of the U.S. House of Representatives (1983–1999).
- Mark Tseitlin, 78, Kyrgyz-born Israeli chess grandmaster.
- Dolores Wilson, 93, American baseball player (Peoria Redwings, Chicago Colleens).
- Heinz Werner Zimmermann, 91, German composer.

=== 26 ===
- Esther Alzaibar, 91, Venezuelan ceramic artist.
- Juan Báez, 86, Puerto Rican Olympic basketball player (1960, 1964).
- David Bannett, 100, American-Israeli electronics engineer, inventor of the Shabbat elevator.
- Hamman Bello, 78, Nigerian customs officer, comptroller-general of the Nigerian Customs Service (2008–2009).
- Bud Brown, 94, American politician, secretary of commerce (1987), member of the U.S. House of Representatives (1965–1983), complications from COVID-19.
- Augusto Cicaré, 84, Argentine inventor, engineer, and aviation designer (Cicaré CK.1), founder of Cicaré.
- Philippe Contamine, 89, French historian.
- Gérald Ducimetière, 81, Swiss-born French artist.
- Nora England, 75, American linguist.
- Ludmila Ferber, 56, Brazilian Christian singer-songwriter and writer.
- Roland Glowinski, 84, French-American mathematician.
- Iván Guzmán de Rojas, 87, Bolivian artist, mathematician, and scientist.
- Jim Hilyer, 86, American football coach (Washington Redskins).
- Rosalie Kunoth-Monks, 85, Australian actress (Jedda) and Aboriginal activist.
- Narcélio Limaverde, 90, Brazilian radiologist and politician, member of the Legislative Assembly of Ceará (1987–1990).
- Elgen Long, 94, American aviator.
- Janet Mead, 84, Australian Roman Catholic nun and singer ("The Lord's Prayer"), cancer.
- Jan Michalik, 73, Polish Olympic wrestler (1968, 1972).
- Moses J. Moseley, 31, American actor (The Walking Dead, Queen of the South, Watchmen).
- Ludwig Müller, 90, German Olympic middle-distance runner (1960).
- Thomas M. Neuville, 71, American politician, member of the Minnesota Senate (1990–2008).
- William Northway, 89, American pediatric radiologist.
- Demetrios Papademetriou, 75, Greek-born American immigration scholar.
- Víctor Paredes Guerra, 77, Peruvian politician, member (1990–1992), and president (1990–1991) of the Congress of the Republic, COVID-19.
- Ruy Pérez Tamayo, 97, Mexican pathologist and immunologist.
- Julio Radilović, 93, Croatian comic book artist.
- Mohamad Jemuri Serjan, 92, Malaysian jurist, chief judge of Sabah and Sarawak (1991–1994).
- Jeremiah Stamler, 102, American cardiovascular epidemiologist.
- Ernst Stankovski, 93, Austrian actor (To Be Without Worries, The Good Soldier Schweik, Help, I Love Twins).
- Morgan Stevens, 70, American actor (Fame, A Year in the Life, Melrose Place), heart disease.
- Tony Urquhart, 87, Canadian painter.
- Tim Van Galder, 77, American football player (St. Louis Cardinals) and broadcaster (KMOV), cancer.
- Peter Wood, 70, English cricketer (Nottinghamshire).
- Glenn Yates Jr., 94, American politician, member of the Virginia House of Delegates (1965–1971).

=== 27 ===
- Alain Bancquart, 87, French composer.
- Georg Christoph Biller, 66, German choral conductor, Thomaskantor (1992–2015).
- Walter Joseph Bock, 88, American evolutionary biologist and ornithologist.
- Bill Borders, 91, American Olympic wrestler (1952).
- Tommy Brennan, 89, Scottish trade unionist and political activist.
- Buck's Boy, 29, American thoroughbred racehorse.
- Gwinyai Chingoka, 39, Zimbabwean tennis player, complications from a traffic collision.
- Gene Clines, 75, American baseball player (Pittsburgh Pirates, Chicago Cubs, Texas Rangers), World Series champion (1971).
- Morty Craft, 101, American songwriter ("Alone (Why Must I Be Alone)"), record producer, and music executive (Warwick Records).
- Dai Yongnian, 92, Chinese engineer, member of the Chinese Academy of Engineering.
- Antoine Dalla Cieca, 90, French football player (Racing Club de France Football) and manager (Paris FC).
- Andy Devine, 79, English actor (Emmerdale, Queer as Folk), complications from a fall.
- Mohammad Ali Farrokhian, 86, Iranian wrestler.
- Edwin F. Flowers, 91, American judge, justice on the Supreme Court of Appeals of West Virginia (1975–1976).
- Lady Veronica Gibson, 85, Scottish arts patron.
- Gary K. Hart, 78, American politician, member of the California State Assembly (1974–1982) and Senate (1982–1994).
- Pavlo Kuznietsov, 71, Ukrainian politician, deputy (1998–2002), COVID-19.
- Peter Lambley, 75, British naturalist.
- Martin Leach-Cross Feldman, 87, American jurist, judge of the U.S. District Court for the Eastern District of Louisiana (since 1983).
- Mark Levine, 83, American jazz musician, author, and educator, pneumonia.
- Mary Ann Love, 81, American politician, member of the Maryland House of Delegates (1993–2015).
- Woody Mann, 69, American guitarist.
- Nedjeljko Mihanović, 91, Croatian politician, speaker of the Parliament (1994–1995) and member of the Croatian Academy of Sciences and Arts.
- Tim Moreland, 75, American sportscaster (Nebraska Cornhuskers).
- Max Moszkowicz, 95, German-born Dutch lawyer.
- René de Obaldia, 103, French playwright and poet, member of the Académie Française.
- László Palácsik, 62, Hungarian Olympic biathlete (1984).
- María Pellicer, 72, Spanish politician, deputy (1993–1996), member of the Aragonese Courts (1999–2011) and mayor of Castejón de Sos (2003–2011).
- Matthew Reeves, 44, American murderer, execution by lethal injection.
- Ri Yong-mu, 97, North Korean military officer, vice president of the National Defence Commission (since 2007), heart attack.
- Mick Ryan, 80, British racehorse trainer.
- Salih Šehović, 85, Bosnian footballer (Leotar, Sarajevo, Dinamo Zagreb).
- Susan Shaw, 78, American environmental health scientist, ocean conservationist, and author, founder of the Shaw Institute.
- Charanjit Singh, 90, Indian field hockey player, Olympic champion (1964).
- Merrill Skolnik, 94, American radar systems researcher and author.
- Karl Spiehs, 90, Austrian film producer (Dance with Me Into the Morning, Always Trouble with the Teachers, Cola, Candy, Chocolate).
- Arnold Squitieri, 85, American mobster.
- John St. Cyr, 86, American politician, member of the Massachusetts House of Representatives (1967–1972).
- Coulson Tough, 95, American architect.
- Diego Verdaguer, 70, Argentine singer-songwriter, COVID-19.
- Kenneth Wannberg, 91, American composer (The Tender Warrior, The Great American Beauty Contest, The Four Deuces) and sound editor.

=== 28 ===
- Alphabet Soup, 30, American racehorse, euthanized.
- George Ayittey, 76, Ghanaian economist, president of the Free Africa Foundation.
- Joseph Belmont, 74, Seychellois politician, vice president (2004–2010).
- Sir Erik Bennett, 93, British Royal Air Force vice-marshal.
- Garry Knox Bennett, 87, American woodworker.
- Richard Christiansen, 90, American theatre and film critic (The Chicago Tribune).
- Richard L. Duchossois, 100, American Hall of Fame racetrack (Arlington Park, Churchill Downs) and racehorse owner.
- Paolo Gioli, 79, Italian film director and photographer.
- Werner Großmann, 92, German Stasi general.
- Lali Gulisashvili, 66, Georgian poet.
- John Hare, 87, British conservationist, author and explorer.
- Heidemarie Koch, 78, German Iranologist.
- Brigitte Kowanz, 64, Austrian artist.
- Hans-Peter Lanig, 86, German alpine skier, Olympic silver medalist (1960).
- Guy Laporte, 69, French rugby union player (SC Graulhet, national team), heart attack.
- Donald May, 92, American actor (Colt .45, The Edge of Night, Texas), laryngeal cancer.
- Mel Mermelstein, 95, Czechoslovak-born American Holocaust survivor, complications from COVID-19.
- Gilles Mirallès, 55, French chess player.
- Abang Muhammad Salahuddin, 100, Malaysian politician, governor of Sarawak (1977–1981, 2001–2014).
- Mohammed Ali Salim, 87, Libyan politician, acting president of the General National Congress (2012).
- Harry Steele, 92, Canadian businessman.
- Wayne Stenehjem, 68, American politician, member of the North Dakota House of Representatives (1976–1979) and Senate (1980–2000), and attorney general (since 2000).
- Elis Svärd, 25, Swedish golfer.
- John Tuttle, 70, American politician, member of the Maine Senate (1984–1988, 2012–2014) and four-time member of the House of Representatives.
- Volodymyr Virchis, 48, Ukrainian boxer, suicide by hanging.

=== 29 ===
- Jim Appleyard, 86, British paediatrician, cancer.
- Suresh Bansal, 78, Indian politician, Uttar Pradesh MLA (2012–2017), COVID-19.
- Tony Barrand, 76, British-born American folk singer and academic.
- Marie-Françoise Baslez, 75, French historian and academic.
- Langhorne Bond, 84, American aviation administrator.
- Jean-Paul Bordeleau, 78, Canadian politician, Quebec MNA (1976–1985).
- Rashid Byramji, 88, Indian horse trainer.
- Barbara A. Curran, 81, American politician and judge, member of the New Jersey General Assembly (1974–1980), judge of the New Jersey Superior Court (1992–2000).
- Des Drummond, 63, British rugby league player (Leigh, Warrington, national team).
- Marty Engel, 90, American Olympic hammer thrower (1952).
- Leonard Fenton, 95, English actor (EastEnders).
- David Gordon, 85, American dancer and choreographer.
- Rainer Hannig, 69, German Egyptologist.
- Bill Henry, 79, American baseball player (New York Yankees).
- Howard Hesseman, 81, American actor (WKRP in Cincinnati, This Is Spinal Tap, Head of the Class), complications from colon surgery.
- Tom Huckabee, 66, American film director (Taking Tiger Mountain), pancreatic cancer.
- Jo Kendall, 81, British actress (Emmerdale), comedian (I'm Sorry, I'll Read That Again) and writer.
- Thomas M. Konda, 74, American political scientist.
- Rudi Kopp, 95, German Olympic cross-country skier (1952, 1956).
- Kathryn Lance, 78, American author.
- Sam Lay, 86, American Hall of Fame drummer (Little Walter, Muddy Waters, Paul Butterfield Blues Band).
- Simon Lokodo, 64, Ugandan politician.
- Michelle Marquais, 95, French actress (The Taking of Power by Louis XIV, Villa Amalia).
- Ralph Mellanby, 87, Canadian sportscaster and television producer (Hockey Night in Canada).
- Mary Ryan Munisteri, 83, American soap writer (Ryan's Hope, Loving, Tribes).
- Ibrahim Naʼiddah, 68, Nigerian politician, MLA from Zamfara State.
- Bernard Quilfen, 72, French road racing cyclist.
- Hermenegildo Ramírez Sánchez, 92, Mexican Roman Catholic prelate, territorial prelate of Huautla (1975–2005), COVID-19.
- Danny Ranes, 78, American serial killer.
- Gerd Schädlich, 69, German football manager (Chemnitzer FC, Erzgebirge Aue, FSV Zwickau).
- Les Shapiro, 65, American sports broadcaster (CBS Sports, ESPN), lung cancer.
- Souleymane Sidibé, 72, Malian diplomat and officer.
- Brijraj Singh, 87, Indian politician, MP (1962–1977), cardiac arrest.
- Iqbal Singh, 95, Indian spiritual leader, founder of Eternal University and Akal University.
- John K. Singlaub, 100, American military officer, co-founder of Western Goals Foundation.
- Pete Smith, 63, New Zealand actor (The Quiet Earth, The Piano, Once Were Warriors), kidney disease.
- Michael Spafford, 86, American artist, lung cancer.
- Victor Sulin, 79, American politician, member of the Maryland House of Delegates (1991–1995).
- Freddy Thielemans, 77, Belgian politician, mayor of Brussels (1994–1995, 2001–2013).
- Jon Western, 58, American political scientist.

=== 30 ===
- Frans Aerenhouts, 84, Belgian road racing cyclist.
- Francis Apesteguy, 69, French photographer.
- Jon Appleton, 83, American composer and educator.
- Geoffrey Ashe, 98, British cultural historian and author.
- Michael Beahan, 85, British-born Australian politician, member (1987–1996) and president of the Australian Senate (1995–1996).
- Maya Buzinova, 92, Russian animator (The Mitten, Gena the Crocodile, Cheburashka).
- Graham Campbell, 85, Australian football player (Fitzroy) and coach (West Perth, Glenelg).
- Art Cooley, 87, American naturalist and environmental activist, co-founder of the Environmental Defense Fund.
- Roberto Digón, 86, Argentine politician and sports executive (Boca Juniors), deputy (1985–1989, 1993–1997), COVID-19.
- Alphonse Douati, 67, Ivorian politician.
- Piero Gamba, 85, Italian orchestral conductor and pianist.
- Barney Glaser, 91, American sociologist.
- Lino Graglia, 92, American legal scholar.
- Graciela Gutiérrez Marx, 79, Argentine artist.
- Jeffrey A. Hutchings, 63, Canadian fisheries scientist.
- Jeff Innis, 59, American baseball player (New York Mets), cancer.
- Yale Kamisar, 92, American legal scholar and author.
- Cheslie Kryst, 30, American television presenter (Extra) and beauty queen (Miss USA 2019), suicide by jumping.
- Leonid Kuravlyov, 85, Russian actor (The Little Golden Calf, Seventeen Moments of Spring, The Meeting Place Cannot Be Changed), pneumonia.
- Barry Lane, 89, British Army officer, complications from Parkinson's disease.
- Santiago Manguán, 80, Spanish Olympic long-distance runner (1976).
- Pamela Mather, 75, English cricketer.
- Viktor Merezhko, 84, Russian screenwriter (Family Relations, Flights in Dreams and Reality, Assia and the Hen with the Golden Eggs), complications from COVID-19.
- William Mordeno, 74, Filipino sprinter, complications of COVID-19.
- Takao Nishizeki, 74, Japanese mathematician and computer scientist.
- S. K. Paramasivan, 102, Indian politician, MP (1962–1967).
- Philip Paul, 96, American studio drummer, COVID-19.
- Hermann Rappe, 92, German politician and trade unionist, member of the Bundestag (1972–1998), chairman of IG CPK (1982–1995) and president of ICEF (1988–1995).
- Hargus "Pig" Robbins, 84, American Hall of Fame country pianist.
- Jawdat Said, 90, Syrian Islamic scholar.
- Zvonimir Šeparović, 93, Croatian jurist and politician, minister of foreign affairs (1991–1992) and justice (1999–2000).
- Sally Snodgrass, 85, American politician, member of the Idaho Senate (1991–1993).
- Roberto Solórzano, 76, Costa Rican Olympic judoka.
- Abdul Rahman Sulaiman, 75, Malaysian politician and journalist, MP (1995–1999), chairman of Bernama (2010–2016).
- F. Ann Walker, 81, American chemist.
- Robert Wall, 82, American martial artist and actor (Enter the Dragon, Game of Death, Hero and the Terror).
- Norma Waterson, 82, English musician (The Watersons), pneumonia.
- Zhu Zhaoliang, 89, Chinese agronomist and politician, member of the Chinese Academy of Sciences.

=== 31 ===
- Alejandro Alonso, 69, Mexican singer and guitarist, cardiac arrest.
- Franco Antonelli, 87, Italian Olympic runner (1960).
- Miquel Aubà i Fleix, 56, Spanish politician, mayor of Gandesa (1999–2011) and senator (since 2015).
- Abdelkarim Badjadja, 76, Algerian archivist and historian
- Ekkehardt Belle, 67, German actor (Derrick).
- Pierre Bellon, 92, French businessman, founder of Sodexo.
- James Bidgood, 88, American filmmaker, photographer, and visual and performance artist, complications from COVID-19.
- Sir Richard Buckley, 94, British courtier and naval officer.
- Dora Cadavid, 84, Colombian actress (Yo soy Betty, la fea, Café con aroma de mujer).
- Carleton Carpenter, 95, American actor (Two Weeks with Love, Three Little Words, Summer Stock).
- Onésimo Cepeda Silva, 84, Mexican Roman Catholic prelate, bishop of Ecatepec (1995–2012), COVID-19.
- Nancy Ezer, 74, American Hebrew scholar.
- Tatiana Farnese, 97, Italian actress (A Garibaldian in the Convent, The Mad Marechiaro).
- Delma Furniss, 87, American politician, member of the Mississippi House of Representatives (1984–1993) and Senate (1993–2004).
- E. William Henry, 92, American lawyer, chair of the Federal Communications Commission (1963–1966).
- Salvador Hernández, 60, Mexican Olympic judoka.
- Jimmy Johnson, 93, American blues guitarist and singer.
- Paul Kelman, 72, English-born Canadian actor (My Bloody Valentine, Gas, Black Roses).
- Jiří Kyncl, 59, Czech Olympic speed skater (1988, 1992).
- Liao Cheng-hao, 75, Taiwanese politician, minister of justice (1996–1998).
- Mohamed Abdul Salam Mahgoub, 86, Egyptian politician, governor of Alexandria (1997–2006) and Ismailia Governorate (1994–1997).
- Luis Martínez, 55, Guatemalan Olympic runner.
- Henry J. Muller, 104, American Army brigadier general.
- Phyllis Ndlovu, Zimbabwean politician.
- Voldemaras Novickis, 65, Lithuanian handball player (Granitas Kaunas, Soviet Union national team), Olympic champion (1988), cancer.
- Mike Nykoluk, 87, Canadian ice hockey player and coach (Toronto Maple Leafs, Hershey Bears).
- Thomas A. Pankok, 90, American politician, member of the New Jersey General Assembly (1982–1986).
- Ed Philip, 81, Canadian politician.
- Wichannoi Porntawee, 74, Thai Muay Thai kickboxer, renal failure.
- Radko Pytlík, 93, Czech literary historian and writer.
- Flemming Quist Møller, 79, Danish animator (Benny's Bathtub, Jungledyret Hugo) and screenwriter (Black Harvest), heart attack.
- C. R. Rajagopalan, 64, Indian folklore researcher, COVID-19.
- Dick Renick, 91, American politician.
- Isabel Robalino, 104, Ecuadorian lawyer and politician, senator (1968–1970).
- Willy Schneider, 92, Swiss Olympic sprinter (1972).
- Bienvenu Sene Mongaba, 55, Congolese writer.
- Leon Silver, 96, American geologist.
- Rajeev Kumar Singh, 69, Indian politician, Uttar Pradesh MLA (1985–1991, 1996–2017).
- Jerry Snyder, 92, American baseball player (Washington Senators), cancer.
- Gloria Tew, 98, American abstract sculptor.
