= Larry Mead =

American politician (1938–2022)

Member of the U.S. House of Representatives from Missouri's 111th district
- Incumbent
- Assumed office 1973

Missouri House of Representatives

Personal details
- Born: 1938 Avon, Illinois, US
- Died: 2022 (aged 83–84)
- Party: Republican
- Spouse: Kathy Phillips
- Children: 2 (1 son, 1 daughter)
- Occupation: magazine editor

Larry Edward Mead (March 1, 1938 – January 11, 2022) was an American Republican politician who served in the Missouri House of Representatives. He was born in Avon, Illinois, and was educated at Bushnell Prairie City Illinois High School and Western Illinois University in Macomb, Illinois, where he studied agriculture, journalism, and business administration. In 1961, he married Kathy Phillips in Rock Island, Illinois. Mead managed the world's largest annual individual sheep show and sale for 55 years.
