= Tong Wai Ki =

Hong Kong politician and Taoist priest (1939–2022)

Member of the Chinese People's Political Consultative Conference
- In office March 2008 – March 2013

Personal details
- Born: March 1939 Hong Kong
- Died: 15 January 2022 (aged 82)

Tong Wai Ki (Chinese: 汤伟奇; March 1939 – 15 January 2022) was a Hong Kong Taoist priest and politician.

He served in the Chinese People's Political Consultative Conference from 2008 to 2013. He died on 15 January 2022, at the age of 82.
