= Bienvenu Sene Mongaba =

Congolese writer (1967–2022)

- Born: 28 January 1967; Léopoldville, Congo
- Died: 31 January 2022 (aged 55); Belgium
- Education: University of Kinshasa; Université libre de Bruxelles
- Occupation: Writer

Bienvenu Sene Mongaba (28 January 1967 – 31 January 2022) was a Congolese writer. Heavily active in languages of the Congo, he published numerous works in Lingala.

== Biography ==
Sene Mongaba was born in Léopoldville on 28 January 1967. He earned a degree in chemistry from the University of Kinshasa in 1994 and subsequently a degree in the same subject from the Université libre de Bruxelles in 1998. He worked as a biotechnology researcher until 2003, when he earned an agrégation in natural sciences from the Université catholique de Louvain. He was a secondary school teacher within the French Community of Belgium from 2006 to 2007 before devoting himself to Lingala within the publisher Mabiki. In 2013, he defended a doctoral thesis in linguistics at Ghent University titled "Le lingala dans l'enseignement des sciences dans les écoles de Kinshasa".

Sene Mongaba's works primarily centered around teaching in African languages as well as lexicography and terminology in Lingala, the language in which he worked and published. He was able to promote literature in Lingala with Mabiki, a publishing house of which he was the founder. He was a member of the association "the Kind of Friends" in Kinshasa.

He died in Belgium on 31 January 2022, at the age of 55.

== Publications ==
=== Novels ===
- En cavale dans le gouffre vert (2003)

=== Stories ===
- Pillage à Kin (2005)

=== Novels in Lingala ===
- Fwa-Ku-Mputu (2002)
- Bamama ya Congo na France (2004)
- Bokobandela : lisolo (2005)

=== Other publications in Lingala ===
- 100 verbes pour parler lingala (2006)
- Ebamba, Kinshasa-Makambo : lisolo (2014)
