= Antonio Borrometi =

Italian politician (1953–2022)

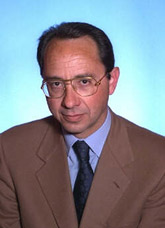
Antonio Borrometi

Antonio Borrometi (27 May 1953 – 19 January 2022) was an Italian politician. He died on 19 January 2022, at the age of 68.
