= Pan Ziqiang =

Chinese engineering expert (1936–2022)

- 潘自强
- Born: 1 June 1936; Yiyang, Hunan, China
- Died: 19 January 2022 (aged 85); Beijing, China
- Education: Peking University
- Scientific career
- Fields: Radiation protection Environmental protection
- Workplaces: China National Nuclear Corporation

Chinese name
- Simplified Chinese: 潘自强
- Traditional Chinese: 潘自強
Transcriptions
Standard Mandarin
- Hanyu Pinyin: Pān Zìqiáng

Pan Ziqiang (1 June 1936 – 19 January 2022) was a Chinese engineer specializing in radiation protection and environmental protection, and an academician of the Chinese Academy of Engineering.

== Life and career ==
Pan was born in Yiyang, Hunan, on 1 June 1936. In 1953, he was admitted to Peking University, majoring in the Physics Department. After graduating in 1957, he was despatched to the China National Nuclear Corporation, where he worked successively as associate research fellow and research fellow. He joined the Chinese Communist Party (CCP) in 1978. He died in Beijing on 19 January 2022, at the age of 85.

== Honours and awards ==
- 1997 Member of the Chinese Academy of Engineering (CAE)
