= José Ruiz Baos =

Spanish bullfighter (1946–2022)

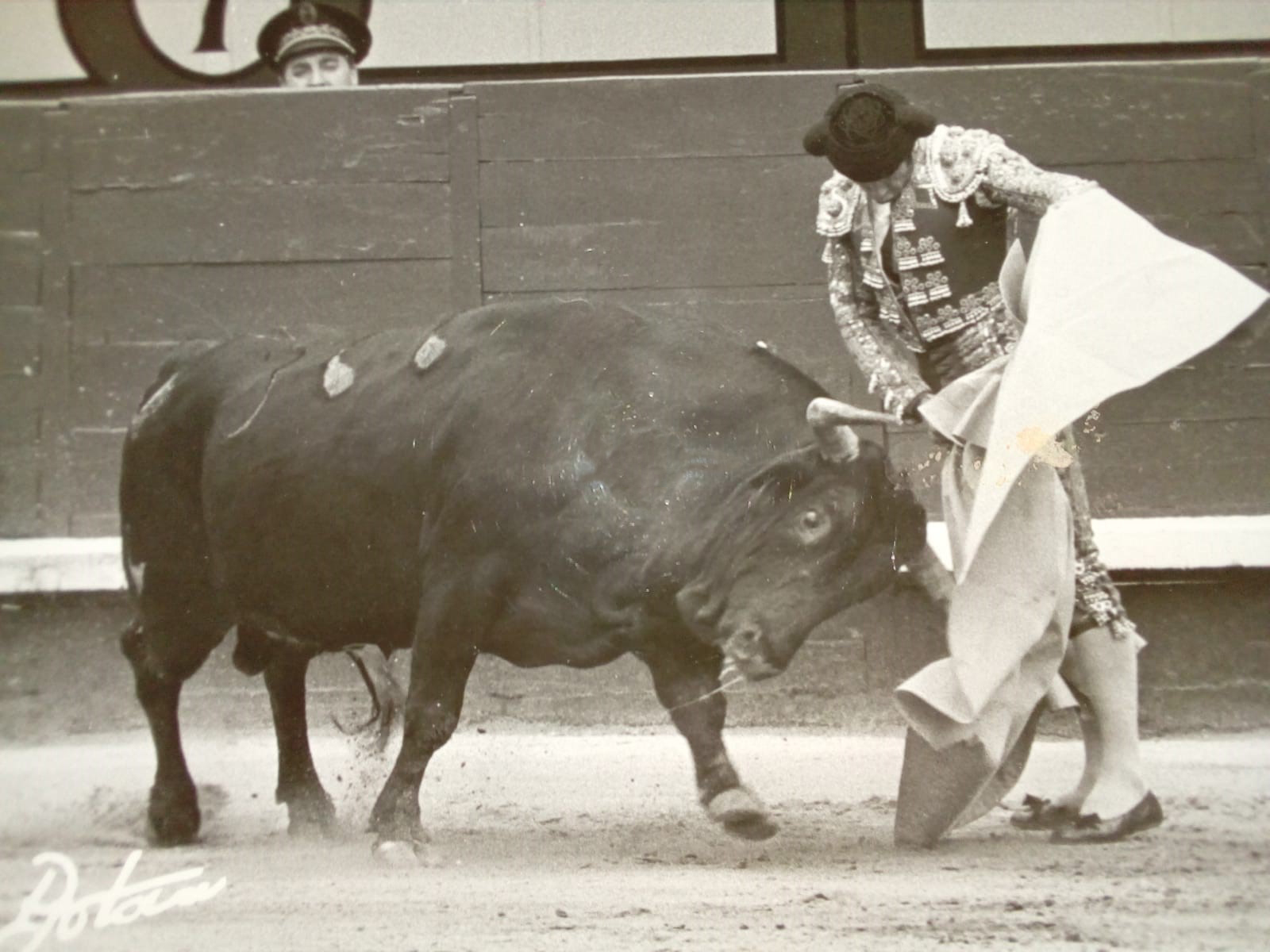
Calatraveño bullfighting.

José Ruiz Baos "Calatraveño" (5 November 1946 – 25 January 2022) was a Spanish bullfighter. He died on 25 January 2022, at the age of 75.
