= Hal Sadler =

American architect (1930–2022)

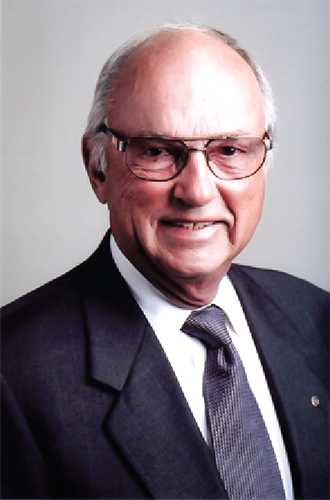
- Born: October 25, 1930
- Died: January 21, 2022 (aged 91)
- Education: University of Southern California; Arizona State University
- Occupation: Architect
- Awards: AIA Lifetime Achievement Award (1983); AIA Public Service Award; Mr. San Diego
- Practice: Tucker Sadler Architects, Inc.

Harold Sadler (October 25, 1930 ― January 21, 2022), often known as Hal Sadler, was an American architect, designer and philanthropist in Southern California.

== Education and early career ==
He graduated from Arizona State University's School of Architecture in 1952 and proceeded to USC where he obtained his master's degree. His early work in the realm of architecture began at a Los Angeles-based architecture firm Jones and Emmons, under the influence of his mentor, A. Quincy Jones.

== Tucker Sadler and Bennett ==
In 1957 Hal moved to San Diego, California where he collaborated with Thomas Tucker and Ed Bennett. The three went on to create Tucker Sadler and Bennett, a successful architecture firm. This firm designed the original FedMart Stores (which became Price Club, and then Costco) and went on to design popular and defining projects including the San Diego State University Library, First National Bank of Southern California Building (now Union Bank), and both Argo and Blake Hall on UC San Diego's campus in La Jolla, California.

== Death ==
Sadler died in San Diego on January 21, 2022, aged 91.
