= Brown Ayres (politician) =

American politician

Morgan Brown Ayres, Jr. (March 27, 1931 — January 21, 2022) was an American politician who represented the 7th district in the Tennessee Senate.

Ayres served in the United States Air Force during the Korean War, after which he became an investment banker.

In 1964, Ayres began lobbying for legislation, and in 1966 he ran for office and was elected, serving for eight years. His legislative accomplishments included sponsoring the 1971 repeal of dry state legislation. (Note: Although Tennessee introduced a policy in 1939 of allowing counties and cities to hold referendums permitting the "package sales of wine and liquor", Ayres' 1971 legislation "(made) it legal to possess up to a gallon of alcohol in all ninety-five counties".)

== Personal life ==
Ayres was the grandson of University of Tennessee president Brown Ayres.

He was married and divorced three times; after granting his third divorce, the judge humorously issued an order forbidding him to remarry a fourth time.
