= Miquel Aubà i Fleix =

Spanish politician (1965–2022)

Member of the Senate of Spain
- In office 20 December 2015 – 31 January 2022
- Constituency: Tarragona

Mayor of Gandesa
- In office 3 July 1999 – 21 May 2011
- Preceded by: Francesc Bové i Tarragó
- Succeeded by: Carles Luz i Muñoz

Personal details
- Born: 5 June 1965 Gandesa, Spain
- Died: 31 January 2022 (aged 56)
- Party: ERC

Miquel Aubà i Fleix (5 June 1965 – 31 January 2022) was a Spanish politician. A member of the Republican Left of Catalonia, he served in the Senate of Spain from 2015 until his death on 31 January 2022, at the age of 56.
