= Egon Schübeler =

German politician (1927–2022)

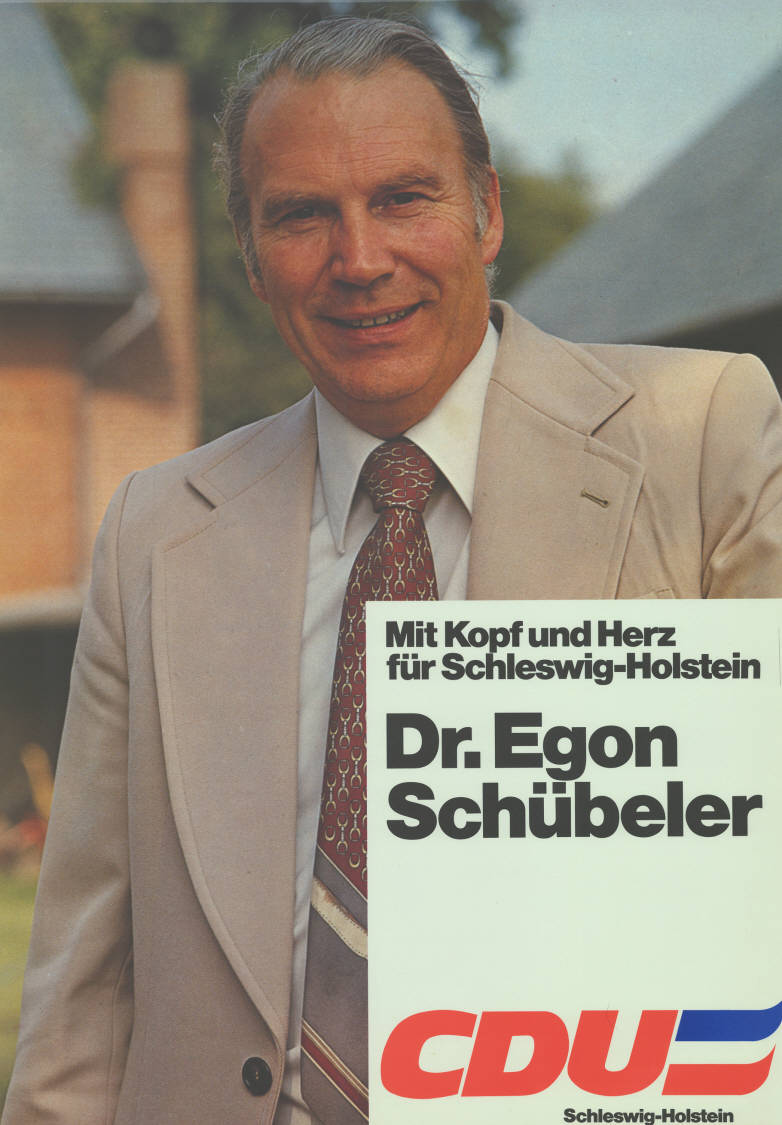
- Schübeler in 1979

Member of the Landtag of Schleswig-Holstein
- In office 1967–1987

Personal details
- Born: 4 September 1927 Flensburg, Schleswig-Holstein, Preussen, Germany
- Died: 20 January 2022 (aged 94)
- Party: CDU

Egon Schübeler (4 September 1927 – 20 January 2022) was a German politician. A member of the Christian Democratic Union of Germany, he served in the Landtag of Schleswig-Holstein from 1967 to 1987. He died on 20 January 2022, at the age of 94.
