= Alejandro Quiroz =

Mexican modern pentathlete (1920–2022)

Personal information
- Full name: Alejandro Quiroz Galvez
- Born: 9 August 1920 Mexico City, Mexico
- Died: 10 January 2022 (aged 101)

Sport
- Sport: Modern pentathlon

Alejandro Quiroz (9 August 1920 – 10 January 2022) was a Mexican modern pentathlete. He competed at the 1948 Summer Olympics.
