= María Pellicer =

Spanish politician (1950–2022)

María Pellicer (1950 – 27 January 2022) was a Spanish politician.

Member of the Spanish Socialist Workers' Party, she served as member of the Congress of Deputies between 1993 and 1996, member of the Cortes of Aragon between 1999 and 2011 and mayor of Castejón de Sos between 2003 and 2011. She died on 27 January 2022, at the age of 72 after a long illness.
