= Paolo Schiavocampo =

Italian painter and sculptor (1924–2022)

- Born: 6 November 1924; Palermo, Italy
- Died: 14 January 2022 (aged 97); Milan, Italy
- Occupation: Artist

Paolo Schiavocampo (6 November 1924 – 14 January 2022) was an Italian painter and sculptor. He received most of his success from his collaborations with Fiumara d'arte in Messina.

== Biography ==
Schiavocampo was a student of Giacomo Manzù and studied architecture in Rome and Milan, and subsequently art history in Venice. In 1964, he stayed in New York City to work alongside Salvatore Scarpitta. His works have been acquired by various museums and collections, particularly at the Visconti Castle and the University of California, Los Angeles.

Paolo Schiavocampo died in Milan on 14 January 2022 at the age of 97.

== Works ==
- Figura
