= Hans Nisblé =

German politician (1945–2022)

Hans Niblé

Mayor of Bezirk Wedding
- In office 17 November 1994 – 1 January 2001
- Preceded by: Jörg-Otto Spiller
- Succeeded by: position abolished

Member of the Abgeordnetenhaus of Berlin
- In office 1985

Personal details
- Born: Hans Walter Peter Nisblé; 28 March 1945 Berlin, Brandenburg, Prussia, Germany
- Died: 11 January 2022 (aged 76)
- Party: SPD

Hans Walter Peter Nisblé (28 March 1945 – 11 January 2022) was a German politician. A member of the Social Democratic Party of Germany, he served in the Abgeordnetenhaus of Berlin in 1985 and was subsequently mayor of Bezirk Wedding from 1994 to 2001. He died on 11 January 2022, at the age of 76.
