= Elsa Malpartida =

Peruvian member of the Andean Parliament (c. 1961–2022)

Elsa Malpartida (c. 1961 – 21 January 2022) was a Peruvian politician who was a member of the Andean Parliament, elected on the Union for Peru ticket. Malpartida died on 21 January 2022, at the age of 60.
