= José Cardoso Dutra =

Brazilian politician (1937–2022)

Member of the Chamber of Deputies of Brazil
- In office 1987–1995
- Constituency: Amazonas

Member of the Legislative Assembly of Amazonas
- In office 1983–1987
- In office 1971–1979

Personal details
- Born: 18 July 1937 Barreirinha, Brazil
- Died: 6 January 2022 (aged 84) Brasília, Brazil
- Political party: MDB; PTB

José Cardoso Dutra (18 July 1937 – 6 January 2022) was a Brazilian politician. A member of the Brazilian Democratic Movement and later the Brazilian Labour Party, he served in the Legislative Assembly of Amazonas from 1971 to 1979 and again from 1983 to 1987. He then served in the Chamber of Deputies from 1987 to 1995. He died of cardiac arrest in Brasília on 6 January 2022, at the age of 84.
