= Mel Foss =

Canadian football player (1939–2022)

Profile
- Positions: Guard, Tackle

Personal information
- Born: July 8, 1939; Lethbridge, Alberta, Canada
- Died: January 3, 2022 (aged 82); Denver, Colorado, U.S.
- Listed height: 5 ft 10 in (1.78 m)
- Listed weight: 195 lb (88 kg)

Career information
- College: Colorado State

Career history
- 1963–1964: Edmonton Eskimos

Melvin C. Foss (July 8, 1939 – January 3, 2022) was a Canadian football player who played for the Edmonton Eskimos.
