= Abd al-Mawla Naqi =

Libyan politician (1931–2022)

Abd al-Mawla Lenghi

Minister of Labor and Social Affairs
- In office 26 March 1964 – 2 October 1965
- In office 3 May 1961 – 19 March 1963

Member of the House of Representatives of Libya
- In office 1960–1964

Personal details
- Born: 1931 Benghazi, Italian Cyrenaica, Italy
- Died: 2 January 2022 (aged 90–91) Benghazi, Libya

Abd al-Mawla Lenghi (Arabic: عبد المولى لنقي; 1931 – 2 January 2022) was a Libyan politician.

== Biography ==
He was a member of the House of Representatives from 1960 to 1964 and was the health minister before being appointed minister of labor and social affairs from 1961 to 1963 and again from 1964 to 1965. He died on 2 January 2022, at the age of 90.
