= René Gagnon (painter) =

Canadian painter (1928–2022)

- Born: 27 February 1928; Chicoutimi, Quebec, Canada
- Died: 22 January 2022 (aged 93); Saguenay–Lac-Saint-Jean, Quebec, Canada
- Occupation: Painter

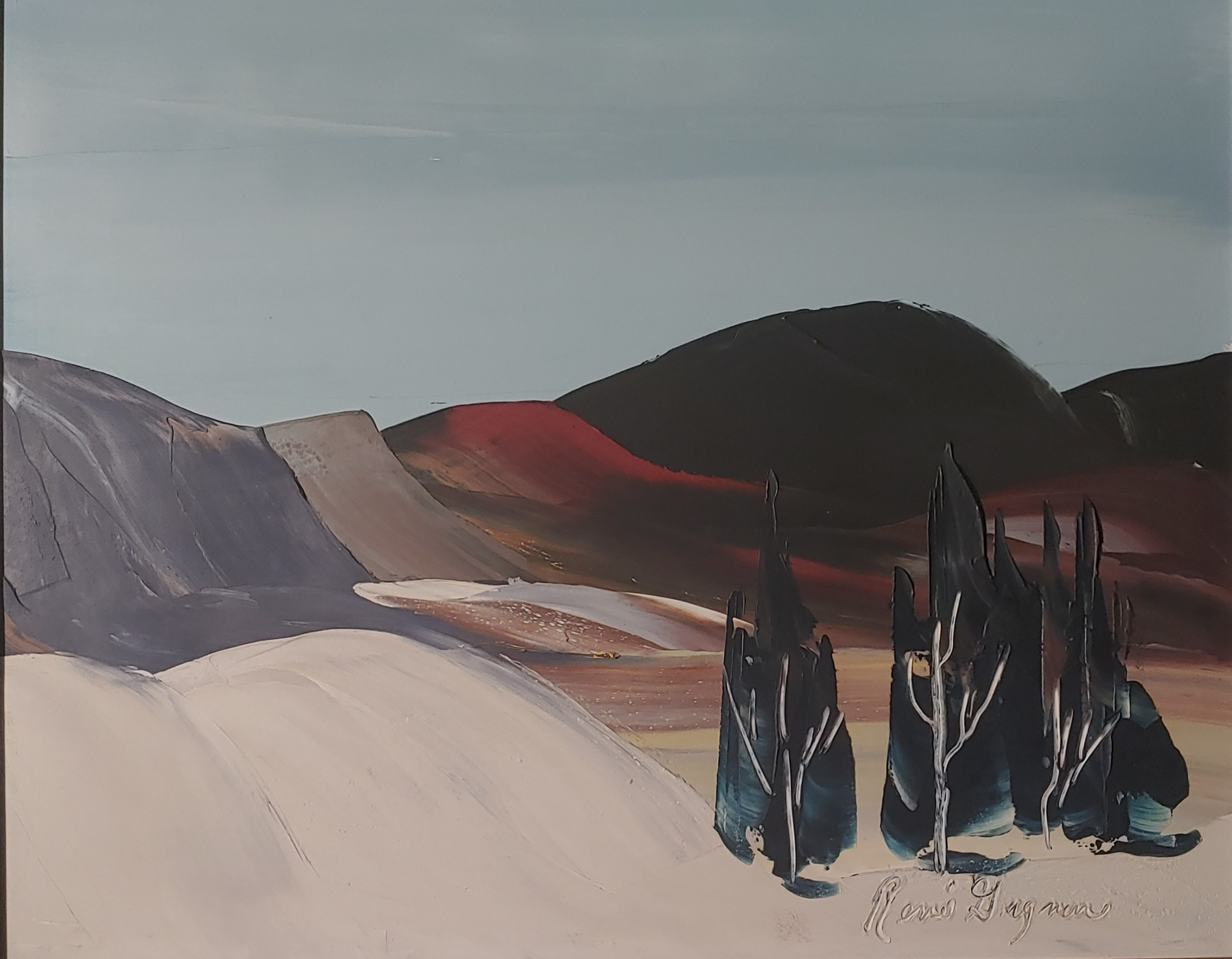
Trees in Hilly Landscape painting by Rene Gagnon

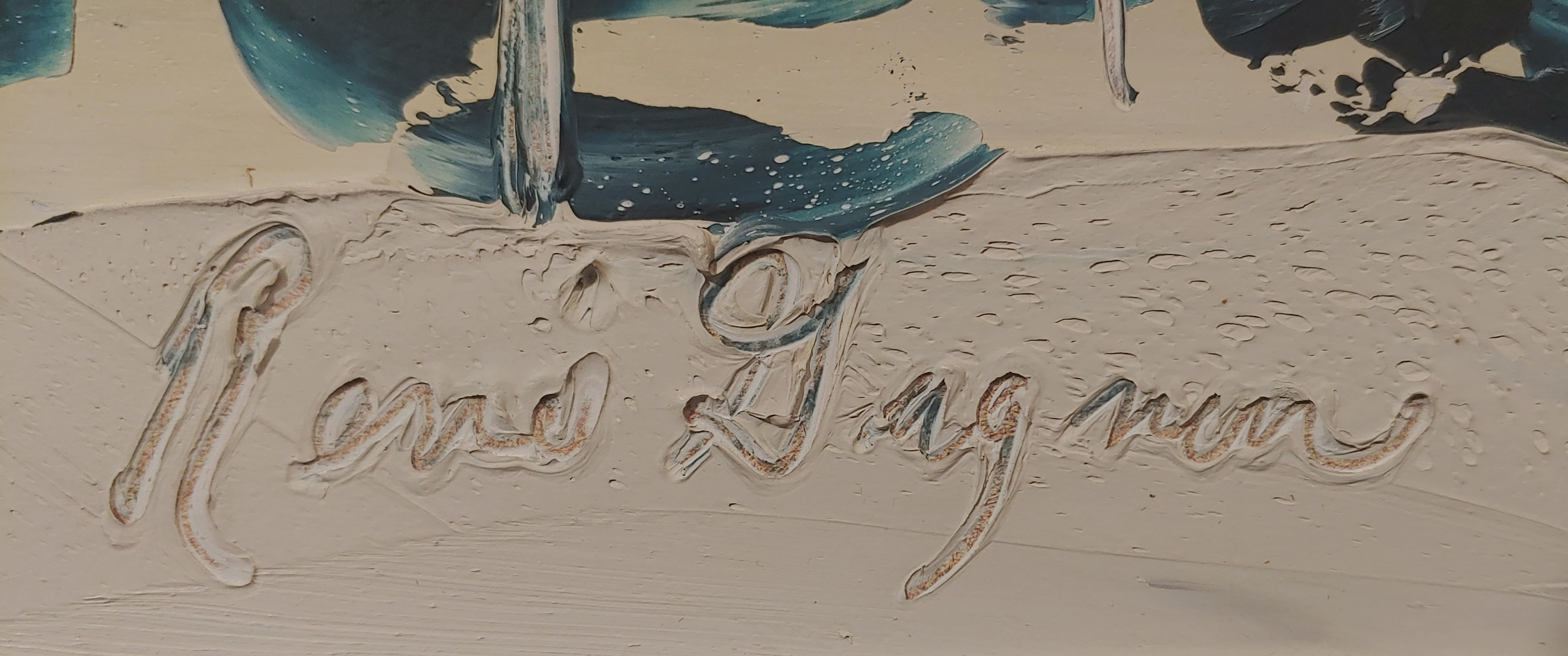
Rene Gagnon Signature

René Gagnon (27 February 1928 – 22 January 2022) was a Canadian landscape painter. He specialized in depicting the landscapes of the St. Lawrence River.

== Biography ==
Gagnon was born in Cap-Sainte-Anne (now Chicoutimi North). He was a self-taught artist, who first exhibited in Arvida. He then lived in New York City until he moved to Montreal in 1967 and founded the Galerie des peintres canadiens at the Place des Arts. In 1974, he exhibited at the Bernheim-Jeune gallery in Paris thanks to music producer Gilles Talbot and journalist Jacques Ourévitch. He had two other solo exhibitions in Paris in 1977 and 1984.

In 1995, Gagnon had several shows in Asia, including Hong Kong, Taipei, Manila, and Kuala Lumpur in particular. In 2004, he exhibited in Morocco. That same year, the Pulperie de Chicoutimi museum in Chicoutimi held a retrospective in his honor titled L’Art du paysage selon René Gagnon.

Rene Gagnon received the Medal of the Quebec National Assembly on June 21st, 2012.

He returned to Montreal in 2014 and set up the Petit Musée René Gagnon. He remained active and kept painting until the age of 88. One of his paintings is part of the White House art collection.

Rene Gagnon's work has been offered at auction multiple times, with realized prices ranging from 100 USD to 2,265 USD

Gagnon died of cancer in Saguenay–Lac-Saint-Jean on 22 January 2022, at the age of 93.
