= Nino Sydney =

Australian architect (died 2022)

Hrvoj Oskar Ninoslav Pleminiti Somogji (1932 – 3 January 2022), commonly known as Nino Sydney, was an Australian architect who served as the chief architect of Lendlease from 1961 to 1973.

As an athlete, Sydney was a professional water polo player and received a silver medal at the World Masters Games in 2002. He was also a very successful water polo coach, as his team lost only eight of its 59 matches in its 1965 European tour.

== Biography ==
Sydney was born in Zagreb, Croatia. He completed his studies in architecture at the University of Zagreb in 1954. He also studied at the University of Sydney between 1956 and 1958.

In 1955, he emigrated to Australia.

In 2015, he received the National Trust Heritage Award.

Sydney died on 3 January 2022 at the age of 89.

== Award ==
- National Trust Heritage Award (2015)
