= Khalid Balti =

Spokesman of Pakistani Taliban (1969/1970–2022)

Mufti Muhammad Khalid Balti

Central spokesman of Tehrik-i-Taliban Pakistan
- In office unknown–unknown

Personal details
- Born: 1969-1971
- Died: January 2022

Mufti Muhammad Khalid Balti (alias Muhammad Khurasani) (Urdu: خالد بلتی; 1969-1971 - January 2022) was a central spokesman of Tehrik-i-Taliban Pakistan. He belonged to Gilgit-Baltistan. He died in January 2022, and was aged between 48 and 50.
