= Rudolf Schwemmbauer =

German politician (1943–2022)

Landrat of Ansbach
- In office 1 May 2002 – 30 April 2012
- Preceded by: Hermann Schreiber
- Succeeded by: Jürgen Ludwig

Personal details
- Born: 26 October 1943 Geslau, Bavaria, Germany
- Died: 13 January 2022 (aged 78)
- Party: CSU

Rudolf Schwemmbauer (26 October 1943 – 13 January 2022) was a German politician. A member of the Christian Social Union in Bavaria, he served as Landrat of Ansbach from 2002 to 2012. He died on 13 January 2022, at the age of 78.
