= Joaquim Amado Quevedo =

Brazilian politician (1946–2022)

Mayor of Tatuí
- In office 1 January 1993 – 31 December 1996
- Preceded by: Wanderley Bocchi
- Succeeded by: Ademir Signori Borssato
- In office 1 January 1983 – 31 December 1987
- Preceded by: Dionísio de Abreu Neto
- Succeeded by: Wanderley Bocchi

Personal details
- Born: 10 May 1946 Tatuí, Brazil
- Died: 24 January 2022 (aged 75)
- Party: PSD

Joaquim Amado Quevedo (10 May 1946 – 24 January 2022) was a Brazilian politician.

A member of the Social Democratic Party, he served as mayor of Tatuí from 1983 to 1987 and again from 1993 to 1996. He died of cancer on 24 January 2022, at the age of 75.
