= Kirsten Fründt =

German politician (1967–2022)

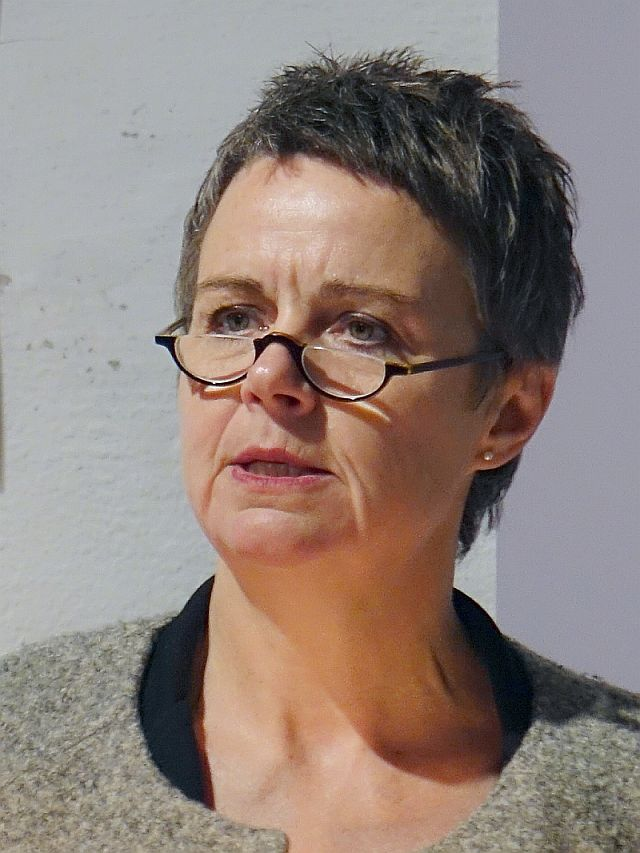
- Kirsten Fründt in 2018

Landrat of Marburg-Biedenkopf
- In office 1 February 2014 – 19 January 2022
- Preceded by: Robert Fischbach
- Succeeded by: Jens Womelsdorf

Personal details
- Born: 30 March 1967 Marburg, Hesse, West Germany
- Died: 19 January 2022 (aged 54) Marburg, Hesse, Germany
- Party: SPD

Kirsten Fründt (30 March 1967 – 19 January 2022) was a German politician. A member of the Social Democratic Party of Germany, she served as Landrat of Marburg-Biedenkopf from 2014 until her death.
