= Volodymyr Pak =

Ukrainian politician (1934–2022)

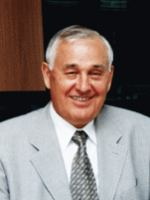

Member of the Verkhovna Rada
- In office 16 March 2005 – 25 May 2006

Personal details
- Born: Volodymyr Petrovych Pak; 17 June 1934 Łany Sokołowskie, Stanisławów Voivodeship, Second Polish Republic
- Died: 6 January 2022 (aged 87) Kyiv, Ukraine
- Party: Our Ukraine

Volodymyr Petrovych Pak (Ukrainian: Володи́мир Петро́вич Па́к; 17 June 1934 – 6 January 2022) was a Ukrainian politician. A member of the Our Ukraine, he served in the Verkhovna Rada from 2005 to 2006.

== Education ==
Pak was born on 17 June 1934 in Łany Sokołowskie, which was then part of the Stanisławów Voivodeship in the Second Polish Republic. He graduated from school in the village Velyki Didushychi, Stryi Raion, Lviv Oblast.

From 1958 to 1960 he studied at the Lviv Cooperative Technical School, majoring in food and industrial goods. In 1966-1971 he studied at the Lviv Institute of Trade and Economics, majoring in trade economics.

Afterwards, he served as a long-time leader in the Ukrainian consumer cooperative sector. He was Chair of the Board for the Kyiv Regional Consumer Cooperative Union.

== Parliamentary activity ==
The person of the candidate for the post of President of Ukraine Viktor Yushchenko was entrusted in TVO No. 92 (2004–2005).

He was a People's Deputy of the 4th convocation from 16 March 2005 to 25 May 2006 from the Yushchenko Bloc "Our Ukraine", № 75 on the list. At the time of the election: Chairman of the Board of the Kyiv Regional Consumers' Union, non-partisan. Member of the Our Ukraine faction (since March 2005). Member of the Committee on Construction, Transport, Housing and Communal Services (since October 2005).

March 2006, Candidate for People's Deputies of Ukraine from the Our Ukraine Bloc, № 150 on the list. At the time of the election: People's Deputy of Ukraine, member of the Our Ukraine party.

He was involved in the liquidation of the Chernobyl disaster.
