= Andrée Fortin =

Canadian sociologist and academic (1953–2022)

- Born: 2 June 1953
- Died: 9 January 2022 (aged 68); Quebec City, Quebec, Canada
- Occupations: Sociologist; Professor

Andrée Fortin (2 June 1953 – 9 January 2022) was a Canadian sociologist, academic, and writer.

== Life and career ==
Fortin was the daughter of sociologist Gérald Fortin and his wife, Thérèse Bergeron.

She was a professor at Université Laval from 1982 to 2013. She was the co-founder of the Groupe interdisciplinaire de recherche sur les banlieues and directed the scientific journal Recherches sociographiques. She focused on social changes in Quebec, the arts, culture, and social media.

Fortin died in Quebec City on 9 January 2022, at the age of 68.

== Publications ==
- Les lieux de sociabilité et de la solidarité féminine (1987)
- Histoires de familles et de réseaux : la sociabilité au Québec d'hier à demain (1987)
- La sociabilité urbaine au Saguenay : vie associative, solidarités et dynamique communautaire (1993)
- Passage de la modernité : les intellectuels québécois et leurs revues (1993)
- Nouveaux territoires de l'art : régions, réseaux, place publique (2000)
- Produire la culture, produire l'identité? (2000)
- La banlieue revisitée (2002)
- Espaces et identités en construction : le Web et les régions du Québec (2004)
- Passage de la modernité : les intellectuels québécois et leurs revues (1778-2004) (2005)
- L'invention du bénévolat. Genèse et institution de l'action bénévole au Québec (2013)
- Pratiques et discours de la contreculture au Québec (2015)
- Imaginaire de l'espace dans le cinéma québécois (2015)
