= Coulson Tough =

American architect (1926–2022)

Coulson Tough (1926 – January 27, 2022) was an American architect, best known for developing The Woodlands with George P. Mitchell.

== Early life ==
Tough was born to Scottish immigrants and was raised in Detroit, Michigan. At age 17, he enlisted in the U.S. Army Air Corps. Afterwards he received a degree in architecture at the University of Michigan. After graduated, he worked for the University of California, helping to design the UC Irvine campus.

== Career ==
Tough was the vice president of facilities at the University of Houston. He first met Mitchell in 1970. He would later serve as chief architect for The Woodlands Development Company. Tough retired in 2003, but continued to help in the design of the Woodlands. It was his decision to add 50 outdoor sculptures.

== Death ==
He died on January 27, 2022, at the age of 95.

== Legacy ==
The Coulson Tough Elementary School is named in his honor.
