= Sally Snodgrass =

American politician (1936–2022)

Sally Evans Snodgrass (July 22, 1936 – January 30, 2022) was an American politician.

Snodgrass was born in El Paso, Texas. She went to the University of Kansas, Boise State University, and College of Idaho. In 1971, Snodgrass moved to Boise, Idaho with her husband and family. She was involved with family counseling. Snodgrass served in the Idaho Senate from 1991 to 1993 and was a Democrat. Snodgrass died at her home in Boise, Idaho.
