= Lali Gulisashvili =

Georgian poet and philologist (1955–2022)

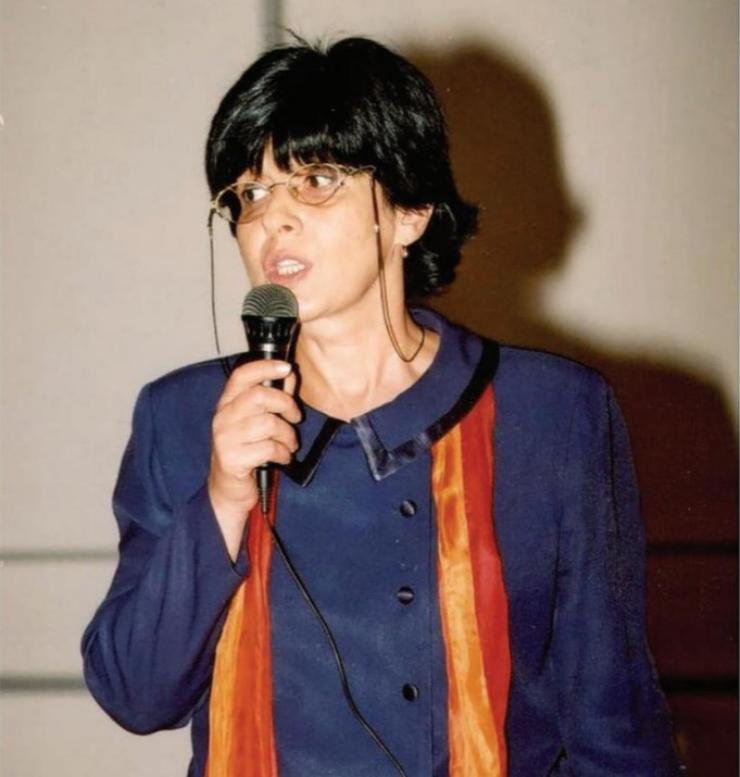
- Gulisashvili in 2020
- Born: Lali Gulisashvili; 10 April 1955; Giorgitsminda, Sagarejo Municipality, Georgian SSR
- Died: 28 January 2022 (aged 66); Tbilisi, Georgia
- Occupations: Poet, essayist
- Writing career
- Genres: Poetry, Essay
- Notable works: I Go To The Sky Through The Fog, 2020
- Movement: classicism
- Website: armuri.georgianforum.com/t981-topic

Lali Gulisashvili (IPA: [lali ɡulisaʃʷili]; Georgian: ლალი გულისაშვილი; 10 April 1955 – 28 January 2022) was a Georgian poet, teacher and philologist.

== Life and career ==
Gulisashvili was born in the village of Giorgitsminda, Sagarejo Municipality, Georgia on 10 April 1955. She graduated from Tbilisi State University in 1977 as a philologist, and earned a PhD in philology.

Her verses were published in the newspaper Tbilisi State University and other periodical editions from 1972. She was also an author of four poetic collections. Gulisashvili's poems were turned into songs for the film Iavnana (1994), directed by Nana Janelidze. These songs became hits on social networks.

Gulisashvili died in Tbilisi in January 2022, at the age of 66.

== Books ==
- I Go To The Sky Through The Fog, Poems, 2020, ISBN 978-9941-9719-5-2
- To My Son, Poems, Siesta Publishing, 2018
- Prayer For Spring, Poems, Merani Publishing, 1989
- Coming Back To The Old House, Poems, Merani Publishing, 1985

== Literary prizes and awards ==
- Honor Medal, awarded by the President of Georgia by the decree N573 on 31 August 1996

== Sources ==
- Gulisašvili, Lali
- Lali Gulisashvili on The Biographical Dictionary of Georgia
