= Carlos Mario Álvarez =

Colombian politician (1967–2022)

Mayor of Armenia
- In office 1 January 2016 – 28 June 2018
- Preceded by: Luz Piedad Valencia Franco
- Succeeded by: Álvaro Arias Young

Personal details
- Born: Carlos Mario Álvarez Morales; 9 December 1967 Armenia, Colombia
- Died: 17 January 2022 (aged 54) Armenia, Colombia
- Party: PLC

Carlos Mario Álvarez Morales (9 December 1967 – 17 January 2022) was a Colombian politician. A member of the Colombian Liberal Party, he served as mayor of Armenia from 2016 to 2018. Mario Álvarez died in Armenia, Colombia, on 17 January 2022, at the age of 54.
