= R. N. Singh =

Indian politician (1948–2022)

R. N. Singh (1 January 1948 – 2 January 2022) was an Indian politician and a leader of the BJP in Maharashtra. He was elected unopposed to the Maharashtra Legislative Council on 3 June 2016.

He was born in the Dominion of India and died from heart disease at his home in Gorakhpur, on 2 January 2022, at the age of 74.
