= Lisa M. Zurk =

American expert on underwater acoustics

Lisa M. Zurk (1962–2022) was an American expert on underwater acoustics and sonar who became a professor of electrical engineering at Portland State University, a program manager at the Defense Advanced Research Projects Agency, executive director of the Applied Physics Laboratory at the University of Washington, and the first woman to chair the Technical Committee on Underwater Acoustics of the Acoustical Society of America.

== Education and career ==
Zurk majored in computer science at the University of Massachusetts Amherst, graduating in 1985. After working in industry, she returned to school for a 1991 master's degree in electrical and computer engineering from Northeastern University. She completed a Ph.D. in 1995 at the University of Washington; her dissertation concerned the remote sensing of snow via electromagnetic scattering.

In 1996, she joined the technical staff of the Lincoln Laboratory in Boston, where her work was split between acoustics and radar. In the 2000–2001 academic year, she traveled to Finland as a Fulbright Scholar. She moved to the Portland State University Department of Electrical and Computer Engineering in 2005, where she founded the Northwest Electromagnetics and Acoustics Research Laboratory (NEAR-Lab). She became a program manager at the Defense Advanced Research Projects Agency in 2016. In 2017 she became executive director of the Applied Physics Laboratory at the University of Washington, and a professor of electrical and computer engineering at the University of Washington.

== Recognition ==
Zurk was a 2006 recipient of the Presidential Early Career Award for Scientists and Engineers, given "for her innovative research on advancing numerical and analytical models to characterize broadband Terahertz (THz) pulse propagation and scattering in random media for potential applications ranging from detection of explosives to medical imaging, and for her dedication to enriching the educational environment and serving as a role model for women in engineering".

She was a Fellow of the Acoustical Society of America.
