= Miguel Muñiz =

Spanish economist and government official (1939–2022)

President of the Official Credit Institute
- In office 1986–1995
- Preceded by: Julián García Vargas
- Succeeded by: Fernando Becker

Director of the Teatro Real
- In office 2004–2012
- Preceded by: Inés Argüelles
- Succeeded by: Ignacio García-Belenguer Laita

Personal details
- Born: Miguel Muñiz de las Cuevas; 22 April 1939 Ourense, Spain
- Died: 10 January 2022 (aged 82) Madrid, Spain
- Party: PSOE–M; PSOE
- Occupation: Economist

Miguel Muñiz de las Cuevas (22 April 1939 – 10 January 2022) was a Spanish economist and government official. A member of the Spanish Socialist Workers' Party, he served as president of the Official Credit Institute from 1986 to 1995 and directed the Teatro Real from 2004 to 2012. He died in Madrid on 10 January 2022, at the age of 82.
