= Arnaud Spire =

French journalist and philosopher (1939–2022)

- Born: 16 June 1939; Annecy, France
- Died: January 2022 (aged 82)
- Occupation: Journalist

Arnaud Spire (16 June 1939 – January 2022) was a French journalist and philosopher. He worked primarily for L'Humanité.

== Biography ==
The son of professor of philosophy Gilbert Spire and Marie-Rose Helphen, Arnaud was born on 16 June 1939 in Annecy. He moved to Algeria in March 1962 and worked as a journalist for Alger républicain until 1965. While he was an underground activist opposing the 1965 Algerian coup d'état, he was arrested, tortured, and expelled back to France.

After earning a degree in philosophy in 1967, Spire began teaching the subject. He was laid off in 1974 due to his union activism and joined the editorial staff of La Nouvelle Critique, a newspaper published by the French Communist Party. After this he worked as a journalist for L'Humanité.

Spire was a member of the executive board of Espaces Marx and a councilor of the Fondation Gabriel-Péri. He wrote numerous books alongside Jean-Paul Jouary and particularly focused on the thoughts of Marxism. He wrote numerous articles for the likes of Multitudes and Regards.

He died in January 2022, at the age of 82.

== Publications ==
- Giscard et les idées : essai sur la guerre idéologique (1980)
- Éloge de la politique (1981)
- Invitation à la philosophie marxiste (1983)
- Le Coup d'État continue : Mitterrand et les institutions (1985)
- Penser les révolutions : seconde invitation à la philosophie marxiste (1989)
- Lénine, l'éternel retour du concret : seconde invitation à la philosophie marxiste (1991)
- Grammaire du pluralisme : entretiens avec Bernard-Henri Lévy, Régis Debray, Paul-Loup Sulitzer, et al. (1993)
- Servitudes et grandeurs du cynisme : de l'impossibilité des principes et de l'impossibilité de s'en passer (1997)
- Marx cet inconnu (1999)
- La pensée-Prigogine (1999)
- Marx contemporain - Cycle de réflexion philosophique ouvert le 16 mars 2000 à l'initiative de l'association Espaces Marx et de l'Université Paris VIII-Saint-Denis (2003)
- L'idéologie toujours présente : dialogue entre eidos et logos (2004)
- Quand l'événement dépasse le prévisible : critique de l'horloge déterministe (2006)
