= José Augusto Curvo =

Brazilian politician (1949–2022)

Member of the Chamber of Deputies of Brazil
- In office 20 January 2016 – 22 December 2019
- Constituency: Mato Grosso
- In office 1 February 1991 – 31 January 1995
- Constituency: Mato Grosso

Personal details
- Born: José Augusto da Silva Curvo; 27 August 1949 Cuiabá, Brazil
- Died: 20 January 2022 (aged 72) Cuiabá, Brazil
- Party: PSD; PDT

José Augusto da Silva Curvo (27 August 1949 – 20 January 2022), also known as Tampinha, was a Brazilian politician.

== Biography ==
A member of the Social Democracy Party and later the Democratic Labour Party, he served in the Chamber of Deputies from 1991 to 1995 and again in 2016 to 2019.

Curvo died from COVID-19 on 20 January 2022, at the age of 72.
