= Valentina Sorokina =

Russian pig farmer and stateswoman (1936–2022)

Member of the Supreme Soviet of the Soviet Union
- In office 1971–1975

Personal details
- Born: Valentina Vasilyevna Sorokina; 27 February 1936 Mikhailovka, Aksubayevsky District, Tatar ASSR, Soviet Union
- Died: 11 January 2022 (aged 85) Aksubayevo, Tatarstan, Russia
- Party: CPSU
- Occupation: Pig farmer

Valentina Vasilyevna Sorokina (Russian: Валентина Васильевна Сорокина; 27 February 1936 – 11 January 2022) was a Russian pig farmer and stateswoman. A member of the Communist Party, she served in the Supreme Soviet of the Soviet Union from 1971 to 1975. She died on 11 January 2022, at the age of 85.
