= Narcélio Limaverde =

Brazilian politician (1931–2022)

Member of the Legislative Assembly of Ceará
- In office 1987–1990

Personal details
- Born: Narcélio Sobreira Limaverde; 8 August 1931; Fortaleza, Brazil
- Died: 26 January 2022 (aged 90); Fortaleza, Brazil
- Political party: PMDB
- Occupation: Radiologist

Narcélio Sobreira Limaverde (8 August 1931 – 26 January 2022) was a Brazilian politician and radiologist. A member of the Brazilian Democratic Movement, he served in the Legislative Assembly of Ceará from 1987 to 1990. He died in Fortaleza on 26 January 2022, at the age of 90.
