= 2022 in Australia =

- Monarch: Elizabeth II; Charles III
- Governor-General: David Hurley
- Prime minister: Scott Morrison, then Anthony Albanese
- Australian of the Year: Dylan Alcott
- Elections: South Australia • Federal • Victoria

The following is a list of events including expected and scheduled events for the year 2022 in Australia.

- Decades: 2000s; 2010s; 2020s; 2030s
- See also: 2022 in Australian television; 2022 in Australian literature; Other events of 2022; Federal election; Timeline of Australian history

== Incumbents ==
Monarch

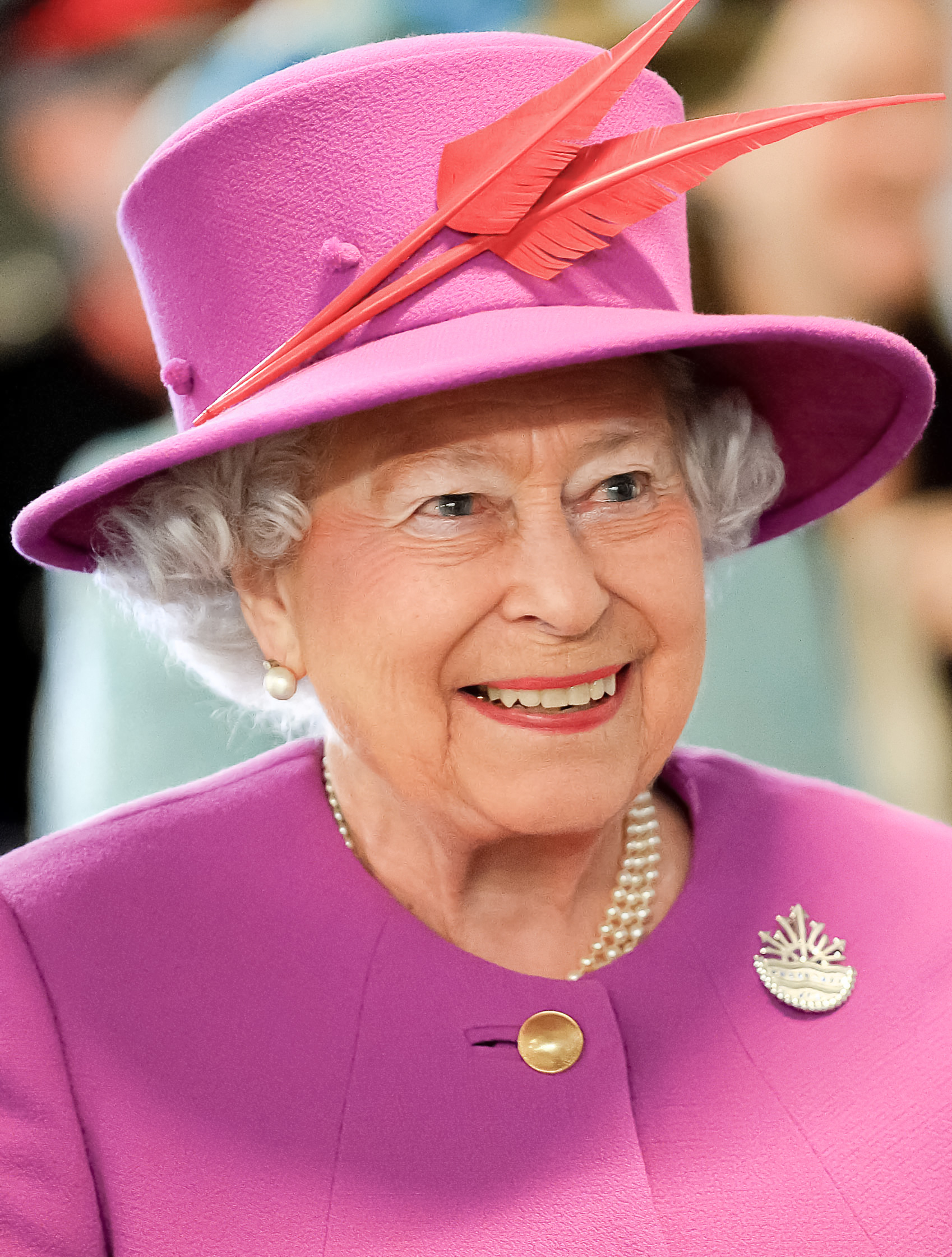
Elizabeth II
until 8 September (Note: Although Elizabeth II died on 8 September 2022 British time, it was the early hours of the morning of 9th September Australian time)

Charles III
from 8 September

Governor-General

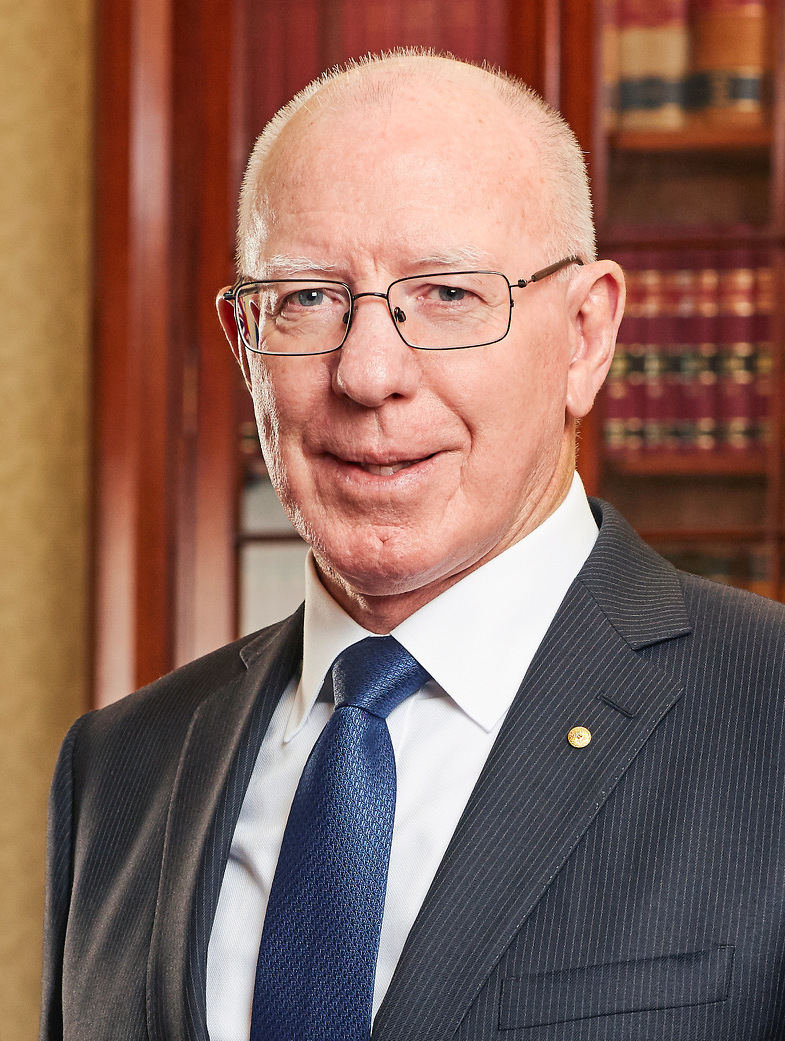
David Hurley

Prime Minister

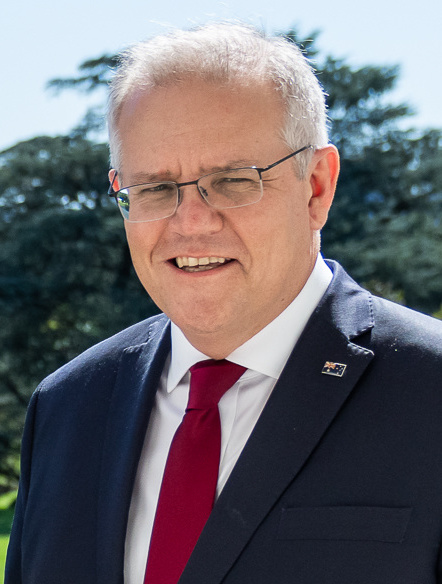
Scott Morrison
until 23rd May

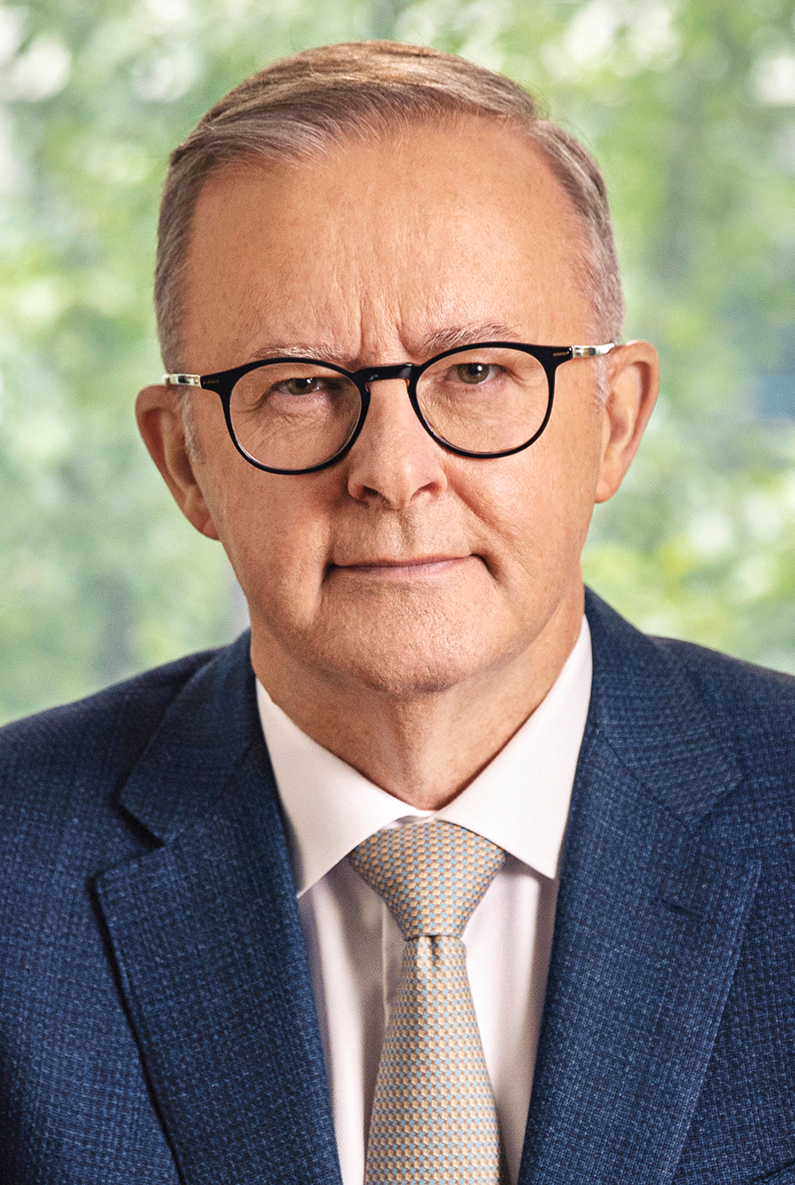
Anthony Albanese
from 23rd May

Deputy Prime Minister

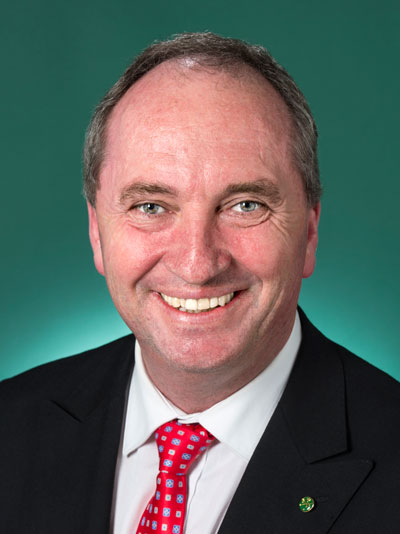
Barnaby Joyce
until 23rd May

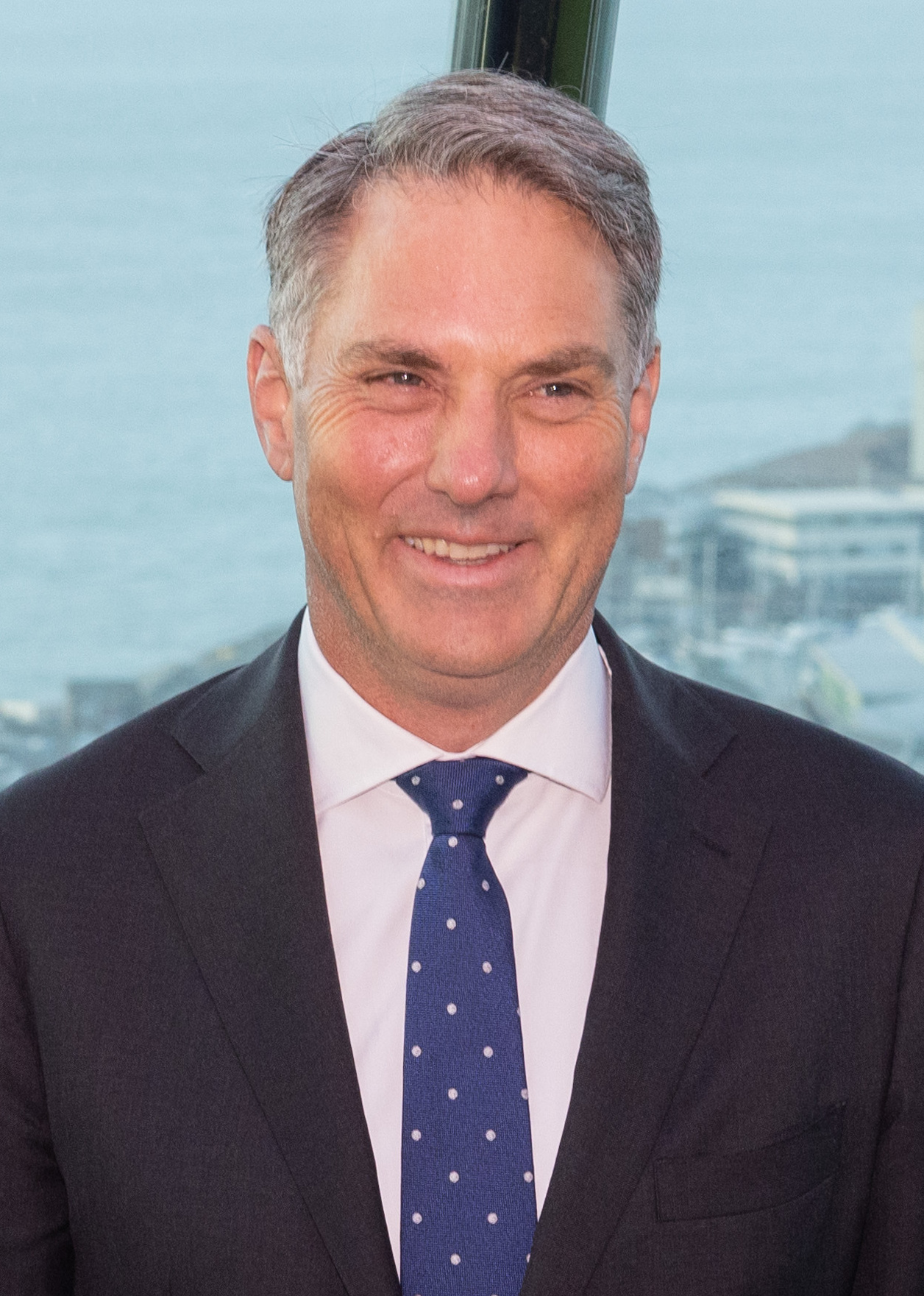
Richard Marles
from 23rd May

Opposition Leader

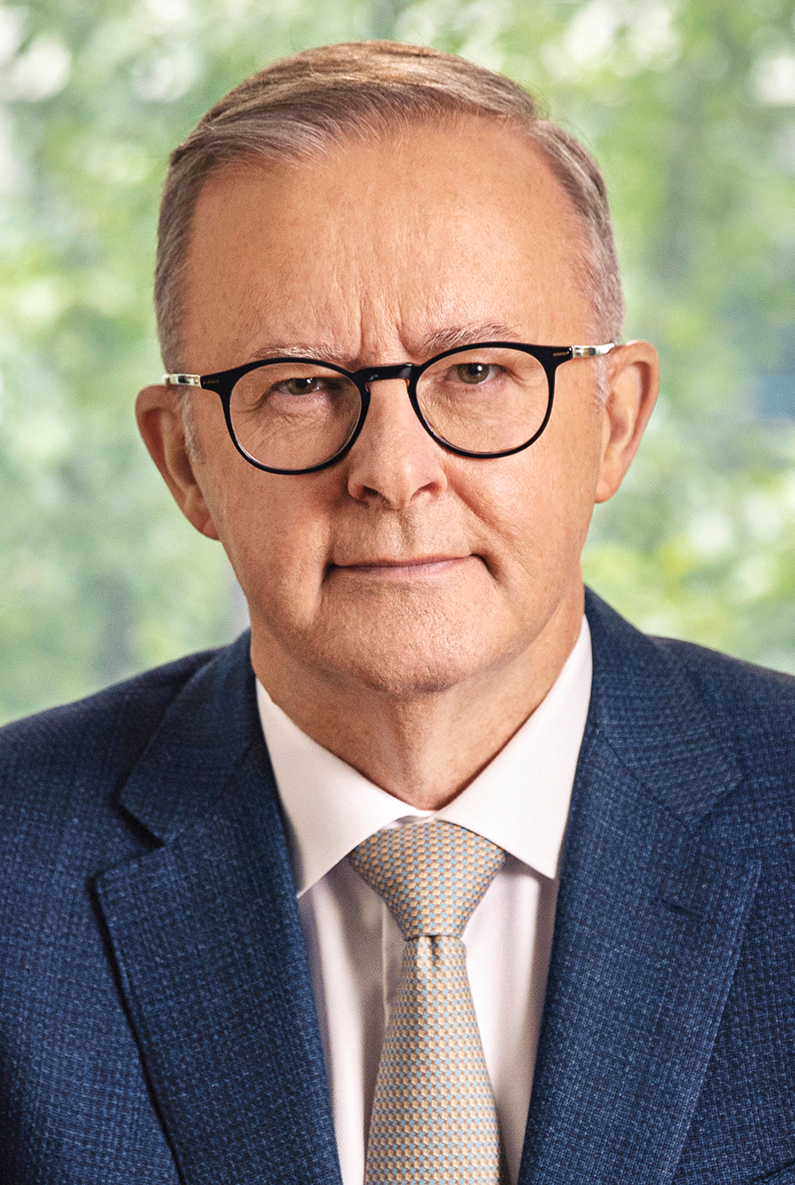
Anthony Albanese
until 23rd May

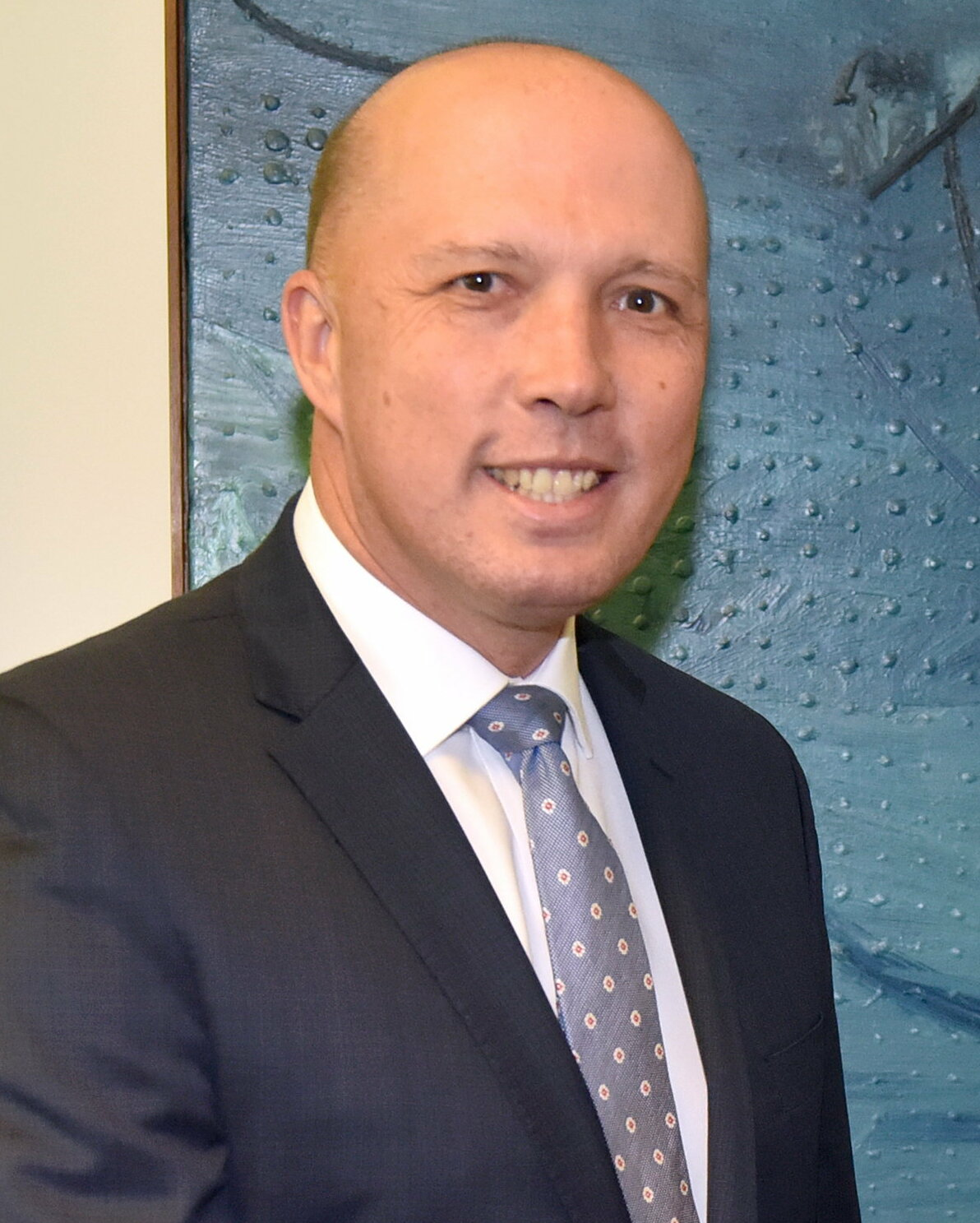
Peter Dutton
from 30th May

Chief Justice

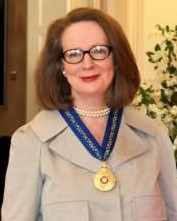
Susan Kiefel

=== State and territory leaders ===
- Premier of New South Wales – Dominic Perrottet
  - Opposition Leader – Chris Minns
- Premier of Queensland – Annastacia Palaszczuk
  - Opposition Leader – David Crisafulli
- Premier of South Australia – Steven Marshall (until 21 March), then Peter Malinauskas
  - Opposition Leader – Peter Malinauskas (until 21 March), then David Speirs (from 19 April)
- Premier of Tasmania – Peter Gutwein (until 8 April), then Jeremy Rockliff
  - Opposition Leader – Rebecca White
- Premier of Victoria – Daniel Andrews
  - Opposition Leader – Matthew Guy (until 8 December), then John Pesutto
- Premier of Western Australia – Mark McGowan
  - Opposition Leader – Mia Davies
- Chief Minister of the Australian Capital Territory – Andrew Barr
  - Opposition Leader – Elizabeth Lee
- Chief Minister of the Northern Territory – Michael Gunner (until 13 May), then Natasha Fyles
  - Opposition Leader – Lia Finocchiaro

=== Governors and administrators ===
- Governor of New South Wales – Margaret Beazley
- Governor of Queensland – Jeannette Young
- Governor of South Australia – Frances Adamson
- Governor of Tasmania – Barbara Baker
- Governor of Victoria – Linda Dessau
- Governor of Western Australia – Kim Beazley (until 15 July), then Chris Dawson
- Administrator of the Australian Indian Ocean Territories – Natasha Griggs
- Administrator of Norfolk Island – Eric Hutchinson
- Administrator of the Northern Territory – Vicki O'Halloran

== Events ==
=== January ===
- 1–8 January – ex-Cyclone Seth causes severe flooding and hazardous surf in South East Queensland and Northern New South Wales. The system crosses the Queensland coast near Hervey Bay on 7 January bringing heavy rainfall and major flooding to the Mary River.
- 6 January – Tennis player Novak Djokovic has his visa cancelled for failing to present evidence of COVID-19 vaccination upon arrival in Melbourne to compete in the 2022 Australian Open. Djokovic is placed in immigration detention pending deportation, and indicates he will commence legal action against the decision.
- 13 January –
  - The number of daily COVID-19 cases in Australia exceeds 147,090 people, fueled by highly transmissible Deltacron hybrid variant.
  - Official deaths from COVID-19 surpass 2,500.
- 14 January – After Novak Djokovic's visa is reinstated by a judge of the Federal Circuit Court on 10 January, immigration minister Alex Hawke uses the ministerial discretion provisions of the Migration Act 1958 to re-cancel Djokovic's visa, citing "health and good order grounds".
- 17–30 January – The Australian Open 2022 is held. Ashleigh Barty wins the women's singles title, the first Australian to do so since 1978. Spanish player Rafael Nadal wins the men's singles title.
- 24 January – The federal government under Scott Morrison announces that, after more than three years of confidential negotiations, copyright ownership of the Australian Aboriginal flag has been transferred to the Commonwealth.

=== February ===
- 5 February – Convoy to Canberra: About 2,000 Anti-vaccination mandate protestors marched to the Parliamentary Triangle. The march began at Glebe Park in the CBD, then onto Commonwealth Avenue, disrupting traffic. United Australia Party leader Craig Kelly and Liberal National Party of Queensland Member of Parliament George Christensen and Senator Gerard Rennick attended the protests.
- 6 February – Platinum Jubilee of Elizabeth II's accession as Queen of Australia. Buildings and monuments across Australia were lit in royal purple to mark the start of the Platinum Jubilee year.
- 12 February –
  - Nichole Overall was elected to the New South Wales Legislative Assembly as Member for Monaro in a by-election triggered by the resignation of disgraced former Deputy Premier John Barilaro. Nichole was the first woman to hold the seat. Nichole defeated Labor's Bryce Wilson who had previously been unsuccessful in gaining the seat.
  - Convoy to Canberra: Around 10,000 Anti-vaccination mandate protesters converged on Parliament House and Old Parliament House. These protesters had camped at Exhibition Park in Canberra (EPIC), after being moved on from the lawns next to the National Library. Police arrested three people including one man for breaching a fence while two others were arrested for disturbing the peace. The crowd was generally well behaved. Participants called for the elimination of mandates and the sacking of government ministers. In response, Police called on protesters to vacate by 13 February.
  - The Māori All Stars defeat the Indigenous All Stars 16–10 in the 2022 All Stars match, held at CommBank Stadium. Māori prop Joseph Tapine, of Canberra Raiders, wins the Preston Campbell medal for Man of the Match.
  - The Indigenous Women's All Stars defeat the Māori Women's All Stars 18–8 in the 2022 Women's All Stars match. Indigenous winger Jaime Chapman is named Player of the Match.
- 21 February – Australia's external border to reopen to all fully vaccinated non-citizens and non-residents, the border has been closed since 20 March 2020.
- 26 February – Flooding in Queensland kills 2 more people, with the death toll rising to 4. An SES Volunteer is among the dead.
- 27 February – The flood crisis in New South Wales and Queensland continues with the death toll in Queensland increasing to 6. Floodwaters in Northern New South Wales are feared to be higher than 2017. The Mary River in Gympie peaked at 22.8m, the highest peak since 1893.
- 28 February – The flooding emergency continues into New South Wales, with Lismore, New South Wales experiencing its worst flood in history. The Wilsons River surpassed the previous highest flood peaks in 1954 and 1974.

=== March ===
- 10 March – The 2022 NRL season commences, with 2021 premiers Penrith Panthers defeating Manly-Warringah Sea Eagles 28–6 at BlueBet Stadium.
- 19 March – The 2022 South Australian state election results in defeat for Steven Marshall's Liberal government, and Labor leader Peter Malinauskas claims victory. Pauline Hanson's One Nation Sarah Game won a seat within the South Australia legislative council (upper house) making history as One Nation first member of SA parliament.
- 25 March – Lance Franklin kicks his 1000th AFL goal against the Geelong Cats at the SCG.
- 27 March – A-League Women Grand Final is held at Jubilee Oval, Sydney with Melbourne Victory defeating Sydney FC 2–1. Melbourne Victory's Casey Dumont was named Player of the Match.
- 29 March – the Supreme Court of NSW dissolved the Christian Democratic Party, a party that had at least one member in that state's Legislative Council, often holding or sharing the balance of power since 1981.

=== April ===
- 7 April – Queensland Liberal National MP George Christensen leaves the LNP, just days before the election was called, claiming that it was not conservative enough. A few days later Christensen announced he had joined Pauline Hanson's One Nation.
- 8 April – Jeremy Rockliff becomes Premier of Tasmania after Peter Gutwein's resignation.
- 9 April – 2022 AFL Women's season 6 Grand Final is held at Adelaide Oval, with Adelaide defeating Melbourne 4.5 (29) – 2.4 (16). Adelaide's Anne Hatchard was named best on ground.
- 10 April – Sydney Roosters defeat St. George Illawarra Dragons 16–4 to win the Grand Final of the delayed 2021 NRL Women's season at Moreton Daily Stadium. Roosters second-rower Sarah Togatuki is awarded the Karyn Murphy Medal for player of the match.

=== April–May election campaign ===
- 10 April: Scott Morrison announces the date of the 2022 Australian federal election as 21 May.
- 11 April: Labor Opposition Leader Anthony Albanese was unable to state the cash or unemployment rates.
- 13 April: Labor said they would not commit to an increase in JobSeeker Payment after the election if they win.
- 16 April:
  - Albanese said he would commit to an anti-corruption watchdog should Labor win the election.
  - The United Australia Party election campaign launch was held.
- 19 April: A debate was held at the National Press Club in Canberra between Minister for Agriculture and Northern Australia David Littleproud and Shadow Minister Julie Collins.
- 20 April:
  - Morrison continued to support his "captain's pick" to contest the seat of Warringah, Katherine Deves, despite her comments about transgender people and surrogacy.
  - First leaders' debate in Brisbane took place in front of 100 undecided voters, with Albanese declared the winner, with 40 votes to Morrison's 35 and 25 still undecided.
- 21 April: Albanese tested positive for Deltacron hybrid variant of COVID-19 and was unable to campaign in person for seven days.
- 22 April: Former Liberal foreign minister Julie Bishop and former defence chief Chris Barrie criticised the Morrison government for not doing enough to stop the Solomon Islands' security pact with China.
- 29 April: Albanese came out of COVID-19 isolation, just three days after he had fully recovered from COVID-19 Deltacron hybrid variant.
- 30 April: Shadow minister Bill Shorten said Labor would hold a royal commission into Robodebt if elected.
- 1 May: The Labor election campaign launch was held in Perth.
- 4 May: A debate was held at the National Press Club in Canberra between Treasurer Josh Frydenberg and Shadow Treasurer Jim Chalmers.
- 5 May:
  - Pauline Hanson's One Nation party was criticised for running "ghost candidates" in several electorates, who are neither campaigning in the lead-up to the election nor have an online presence. Additionally, many do not live in the electorates they are contesting. One Nation committed to run candidates in all seats.
  - A debate was held at the National Press Club in Canberra between Minister for Defence Peter Dutton and Shadow Minister Brendan O'Connor.
- 8 May: Second leaders' debate took place in Sydney.
- 11 May:
  - Albanese said that he supported an increase of 5.1% to the minimum wage or an additional $1 an hour, tied to the inflation rate, with criticism from Morrison claiming that it would result in increasing interest rates.
  - Third leaders' debate took place in Sydney.
- 13 May: A debate was held at the National Press Club in Canberra between Minister for Foreign Affairs Marise Payne and Shadow Minister Penny Wong.
- 15 May: The Liberal election campaign launch was held in Brisbane, six days before the election, where Morrison promised to allow people to purchase their first home using funds from their superannuation.
- 18 May:
  - Albanese addressed the National Press Club. Morrison is the first prime minister since 1969 not to address the National Press Club in the final week of an election campaign.
  - The Australian Bureau of Statistics released the March 2022 Quarter Wage Price Index of 0.7%, or 2.4% annually.
- 20 May: Telephone voting rules changed to allow Australians who have tested positive to COVID-19 after 6 pm on 13 May to vote by telephone.
- 21 May: The 2022 Australian federal election takes place.
    - Morrison advised in a press conference that a boat with refugees from Sri Lanka had been intercepted and turned back by the Australian Border Force. Hours before polling stations close, voters across the country received a text message about the boat turnback, urging them to vote Liberal for border security. The ABC later revealed on 27 May that the act followed a direct request from the Prime Minister's Office to the Border Force in revealing the operation before it was completed.
    - Anthony Albanese defeated Scott Morrison in the election and brought Labor back into government for the first time since 2013.
    - Morrison conceded defeat and resigned as leader of the Liberal Party; his successor will be decided at the next Liberal party room meeting.

=== May ===
- 9 May – The Australian Building Codes Board released Volume 1 of NCC2022.
- 23 May –
- Anthony Albanese is sworn in as the 31st prime minister of Australia, becoming the first Italian Australian to hold the office.
- At Albanese's first press conference as Prime Minister, the podium flags in the blue room at Parliament were changed to include Indigenous and Torres Strait Islander flags in addition to the Australian flag. Replacing two of the three Australian flags.
- Victorian State Liberal MP Bernie Finn was expelled from the Victorian Liberal Party for "a series of inflammatory social media posts", including calling for abortion to be made illegal in all circumstances, and comparing the Victorian Premier to Adolf Hitler.
- 28 May – A-League Men Grand Final is held at AAMI Park, Melbourne with Western United defeating Melbourne City 2–0. Western United's Aleksandar Prijović was named Player of the Match.
- 30 May – Peter Dutton is elected unopposed as Leader of the Liberal Party and Sussan Ley is elected unopposed as deputy leader. Both becoming Leader and Deputy leader of the Opposition respectively.

=== June ===
- 8 June – Queensland defeat New South Wales 16–10 in the first match of the 2022 State of Origin series, held at Accor Stadium. Queensland five-eighth Cameron Munster is named player of the match. The match is notable for housing the highest attendance for a rugby league event since the COVID-19 pandemic's onset two years prior, with 80,512 people attending.
- 19 June – The NSW Liberal Perrottet government announced plans to fly the Aboriginal flag on the Sydney Harbour Bridge, at the cost of 25 million dollars.
- 24 June – New South Wales defeat Queensland 20–14 in the 2022 Women's State of Origin match at GIO Stadium. NSW centre Isabelle Kelly is awarded the Nellie Doherty medal for player of the match.
- 26 June – New South Wales defeat Queensland 44–12 in the second match of the 2022 State of Origin series, held at Optus Stadium. NSW halfback Nathan Cleary is named player of the match.

=== July ===
- 3 July – Floods ravage New South Wales, with Camden flooding for the fourth time in one year.
- 4 July – In the state of Victoria, Since July 2022, the Aboriginal flag will formally fly over West Gate Bridge alongside the Australian flag permanently as announced. The move is the same as NSW Sydney Harbour Bridge.
- 6–7 July – Taree records 305mm of rain in 24 hours, a total not seen since official records began in 1881.
- 13 July – Queensland defeat New South Wales 22–12 in the third match of the 2022 State of Origin series, held at Suncorp Stadium, clinching the series for the team's 23rd overall title. Queensland fullback Kalyn Ponga is named player of the match, while lock Patrick Carrigan is named player of the series.
- 27 July – Upon the opening of the new Parliament, the Aboriginal and Torres Strait Islander flags began to be displayed in the House of Representatives and Senate chambers.

=== August ===
- 1 August – The daily number of COVID-19 Deltacron cases in Australia has peaked.
- 16 August – The Anglican Church of Australia splits: Conservatives form an Australian breakaway church Diocese of the Southern Cross. It is to be led by former Archbishop of Sydney Glenn Davies. The split was caused by the differing positions on same sex marriage among other issues.

=== September ===
- 4 September – Penrith Panthers win the minor premiership following the final main round of the 2022 NRL season. Wests Tigers finish in last position, claiming the wooden spoon - their first as a joint-venture club and their first overall since the Western Suburbs Magpies' 1999 season.
- 8 September – Queen Elizabeth II dies. She is succeeded by her son, King Charles III.
- 11 September – Charles III is proclaimed as King of Australia by Governor-General David Hurley at Parliament House.
- 12 September – Mass COVID-19 testing in Australia will no longer need them anymore.
- 16 September – Same day as New Zealand, Australia declared the end of COVID-19 pandemic after the first 30 months and 2 years of serious outbreak, for example: lifted all restrictions up and then prepare for transition to the endemic phase from Deltacron hybrid variant.
- 19 September – Australian representatives attend the funeral of Queen Elizabeth II in London.
- 22 September – A national day of mourning occurs in Australia for the late Queen Elizabeth II with a public holiday and a National Memorial Service at Parliament House in Canberra.
- 22 September – Optus advises at least ten million current and former customers personal details are accessed in a cyber attack.
- 24 September – The Geelong Cats defeat the Sydney Swans to win the 2022 AFL Grand Final.

=== October ===
- 2 October – The Penrith Panthers defeat the Parramatta Eels 28–12 to win the 2022 NRL Grand Final at Accor Stadium, becoming the second team in the NRL era to win back-to-back premierships. Panthers fullback Dylan Edwards is awarded the Clive Churchill medal for man of the match. Pre-match entertainment is headlined by Jimmy Barnes and Bliss n Eso.
  - Newcastle Knights defeat Parramatta Eels 32–13 to win the Grand Final of the 2022 NRL Women's season at Accor Stadium. Knights fullback Tamika Upton is awarded the Karyn Murphy medal for player of the match.
- 13 October – Ongoing torrential rains cause flooding in Victoria, Tasmania and New South Wales.

=== November ===
- 23 November – The home of prominent YouTube star Jordan Shanks is firebombed. Shanks himself is unharmed.
- 26 November – The 2022 Victorian state election is held.
- 28 November – The National Party of Australia comes out as being opposed to the Voice to Parliament, becoming the first major party against it.

=== December ===
- 12 December – the Wieambilla police shootings a mass shooting at a rural property in Wieambilla, a locality in Queensland, Australia.
- 14–20 December – Thomas Sewell leader of the European Australia Movement and Far Right Lads Society contested charges of affray, recklessly causing injury, and unlawful assault in the Melbourne Magistrates Court. He attended with a number of supporters, including Blair Cottrell. Other supporters, including Neil Erikson, watched the proceedings online. The following week, Sewell was found guilty affray and recklessly causing injury.
- 16 December – the Labor Albanese government announced that it will abolish the Administrative Appeals Tribunal AAT and replace it with a new body.

== Deaths ==
=== January ===
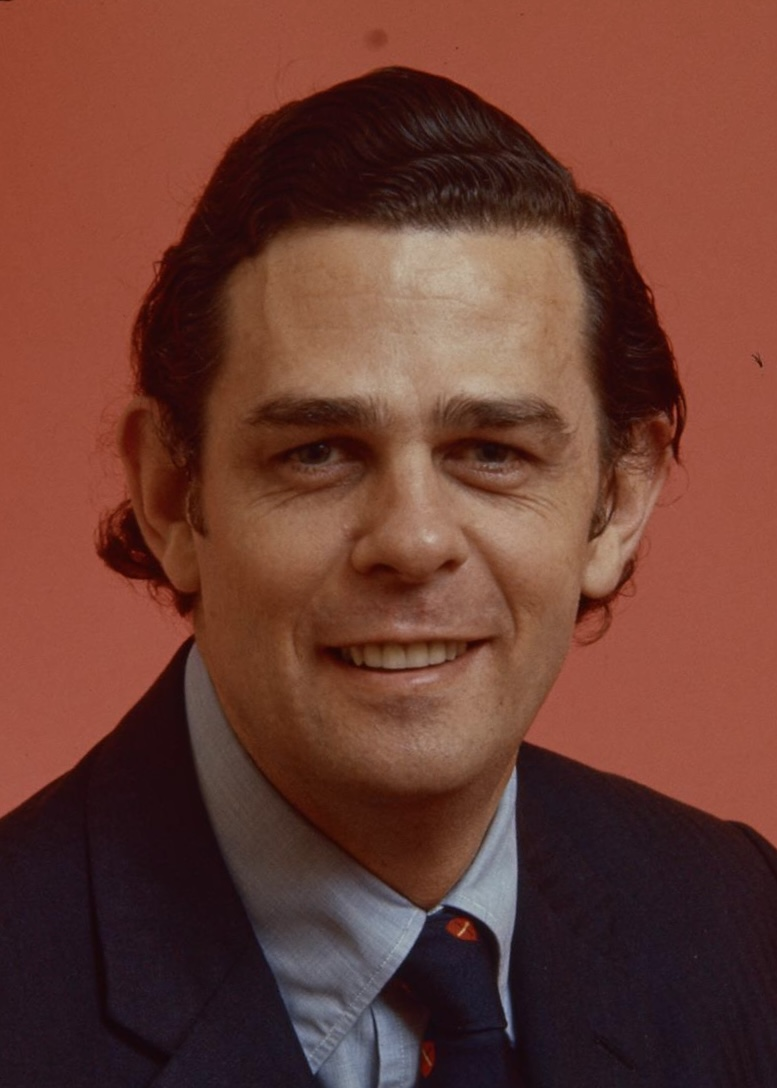
Sir Victor Garland

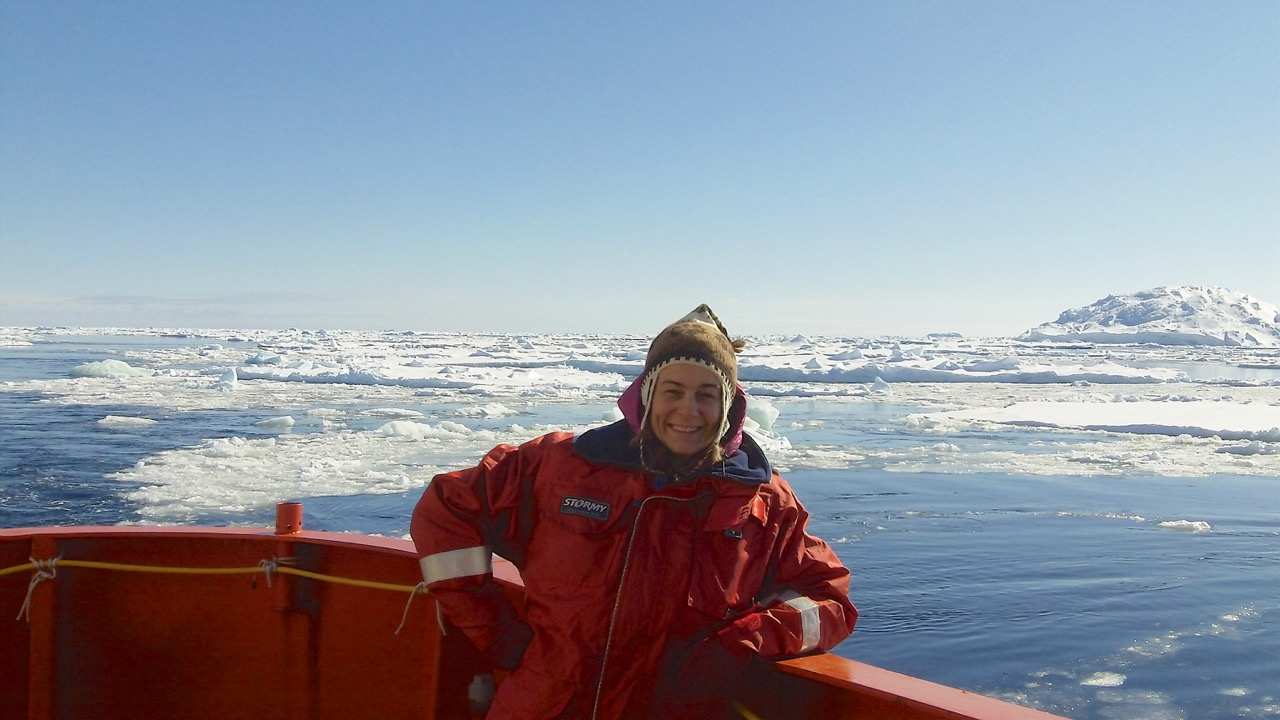
Leanne Armand

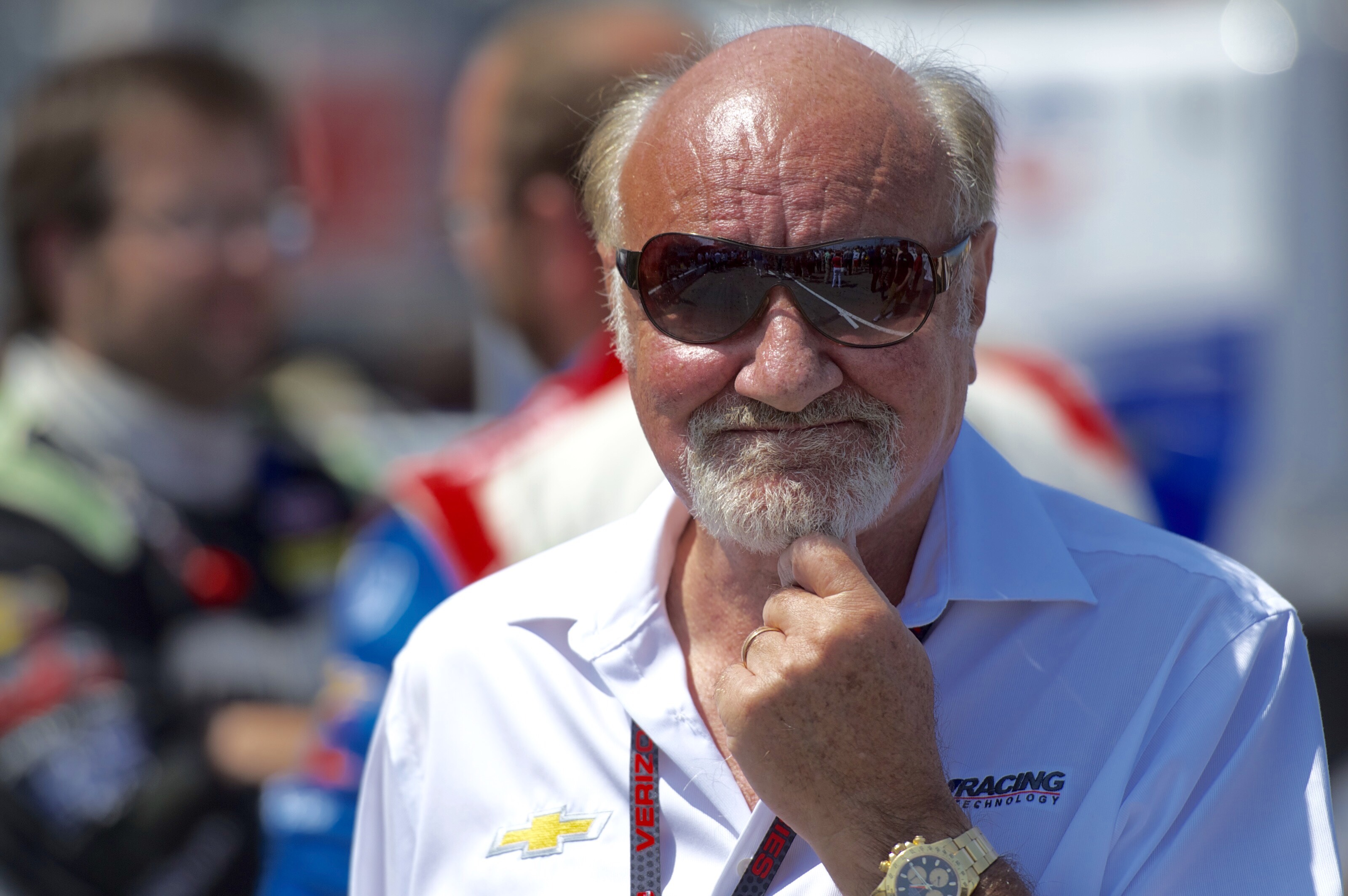
Kevin Kalkhoven

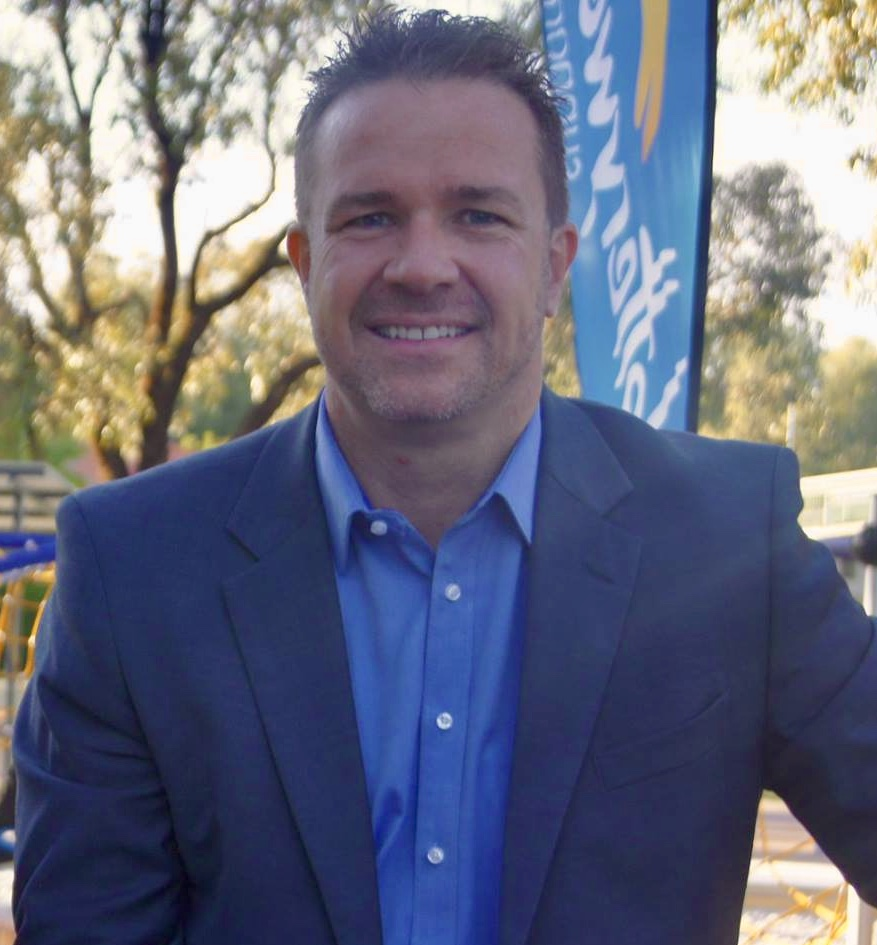
Troy Pickard

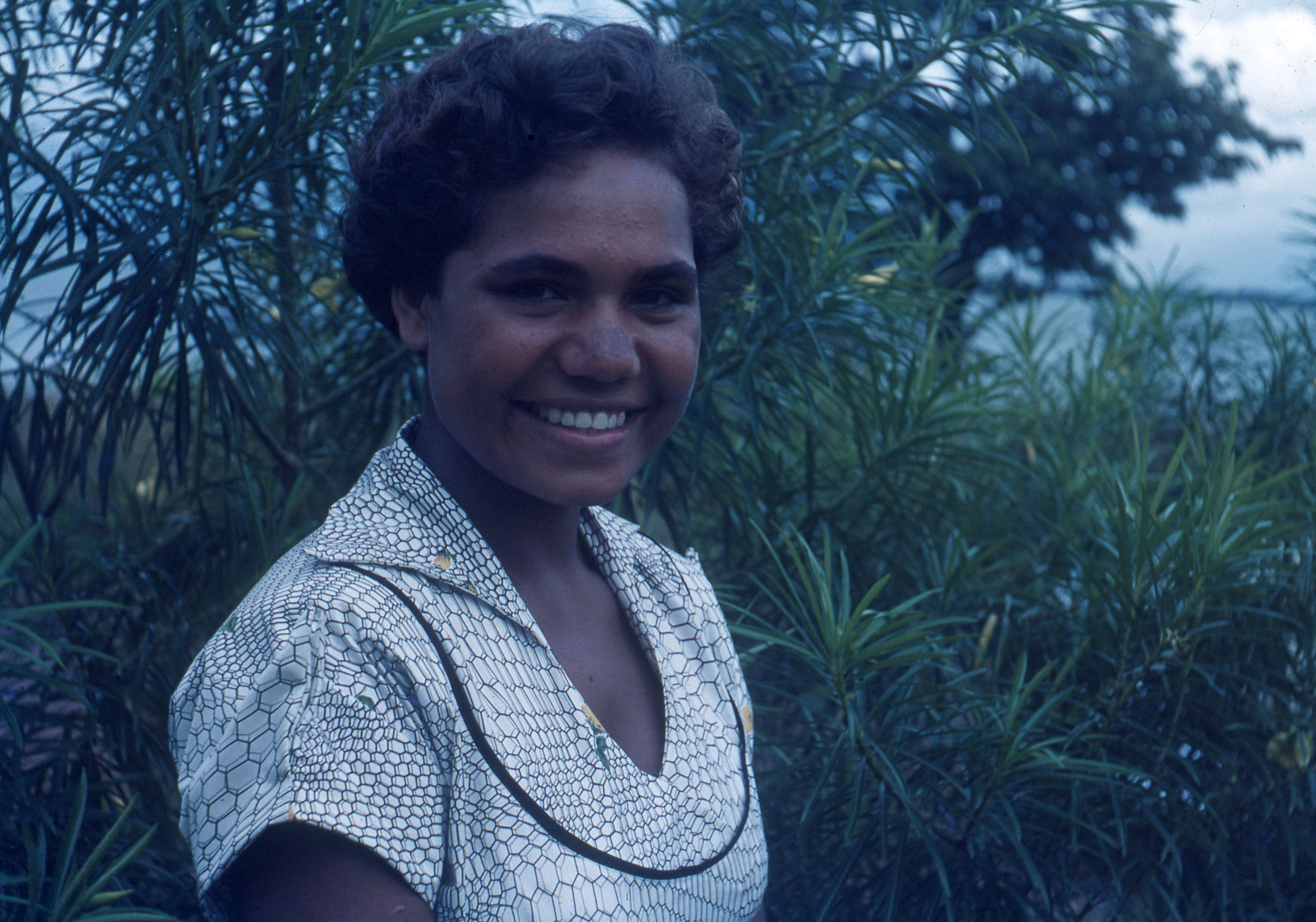
Rosalie Kunoth-Monks

- 1 January – Sir Victor Garland, Western Australian politician and diplomat (b. 1934)
- 3 January – Ulysses Kokkinos, soccer player and manager (born in Turkey) (b. 1949)
- 4 January
  - Leanne Armand, marine scientist (b. 1968)
  - Percy Hobson, high jumper (b. 1942)
  - Kevin Kalkhoven, venture capitalist and auto racing magnate (died in the United States) (b. 1944)
  - Craig Ruddy, artist (b. 1968).
- 5 January – Keith Goullet, Australian rules footballer (North Melbourne) (b. 1932)
- 6 January – Miranda Fryer, actress (b. 1987)
- 7 January – Marc Dé Hugar, guitarist (b. 1969)
- 8 January
  - Bill Cornish, legal scholar and academic (died in the United Kingdom) (b. 1937)
  - Mike Gore, physicist (born in the United Kingdom) (b. 1934)
  - Marc Wilkinson, composer and conductor (born in France) (b. 1929)
- 9 January
  - Harley Balic, Australian rules footballer (Fremantle) (b. 1997)
  - Derek Goldby, theatre director (b. 1940)
  - Bob Shearer, golfer and golf course architect (b. 1948)
- 10 January
  - Garry Bradbury, musician (born in the United Kingdom) (b. 1960)
  - Gerald Tanner, Australian rules footballer (Richmond) (b. 1921)
- 12 January
  - Colin Harburn, cricketer (b. 1938)
  - Geoff Wilson, Australian rules footballer (Hawthorn) (b. 1940)
- 13 January – Troy Pickard, Western Australian politician (b. 1973)
- 15 January
  - Scot Palmer, sports journalist (b. 1937)
  - Hossein Valamanesh, contemporary artist (born in Iran) (b. 1949)
- 16 January – Jill Robb, film producer (born in the United Kingdom) (b. 1934)
- 17 January
  - Dean Jaensch, political scientist (b. 1936)
  - Stan Neilly, New South Wales politician (b. 1942)
- 19 January – Kenneth Norman Jones, public servant (b. 1924)
- 20 January – Ron Grey, senior army officer and commissioner of the Australian Federal Police (b. 1930)
- 21 January – Fred Moore, miner and trade unionist (b. 1922)
- 22 January
  - Denise Allen, Victorian politician (b. 1953)
  - Judy Banks, television presenter and actress (b. 1935)
  - Craig McGregor, journalist (b. 1933)
  - Baillieu Myer, businessman and philanthropist (born in the United States) (b. 1926)
  - Michael Thornhill, film director, producer and screenwriter (b. 1941)
- 26 January
  - Rosalie Kunoth-Monks, actress and Aboriginal activist (b. 1937)
  - Janet Mead, Catholic nun and singer (b. 1937)
- 30 January
  - Michael Beahan, Western Australian politician (born in the United Kingdom) (b. 1937)
  - Graham Campbell, Australian rules footballer (Fitzroy) (b. 1936)

=== February ===
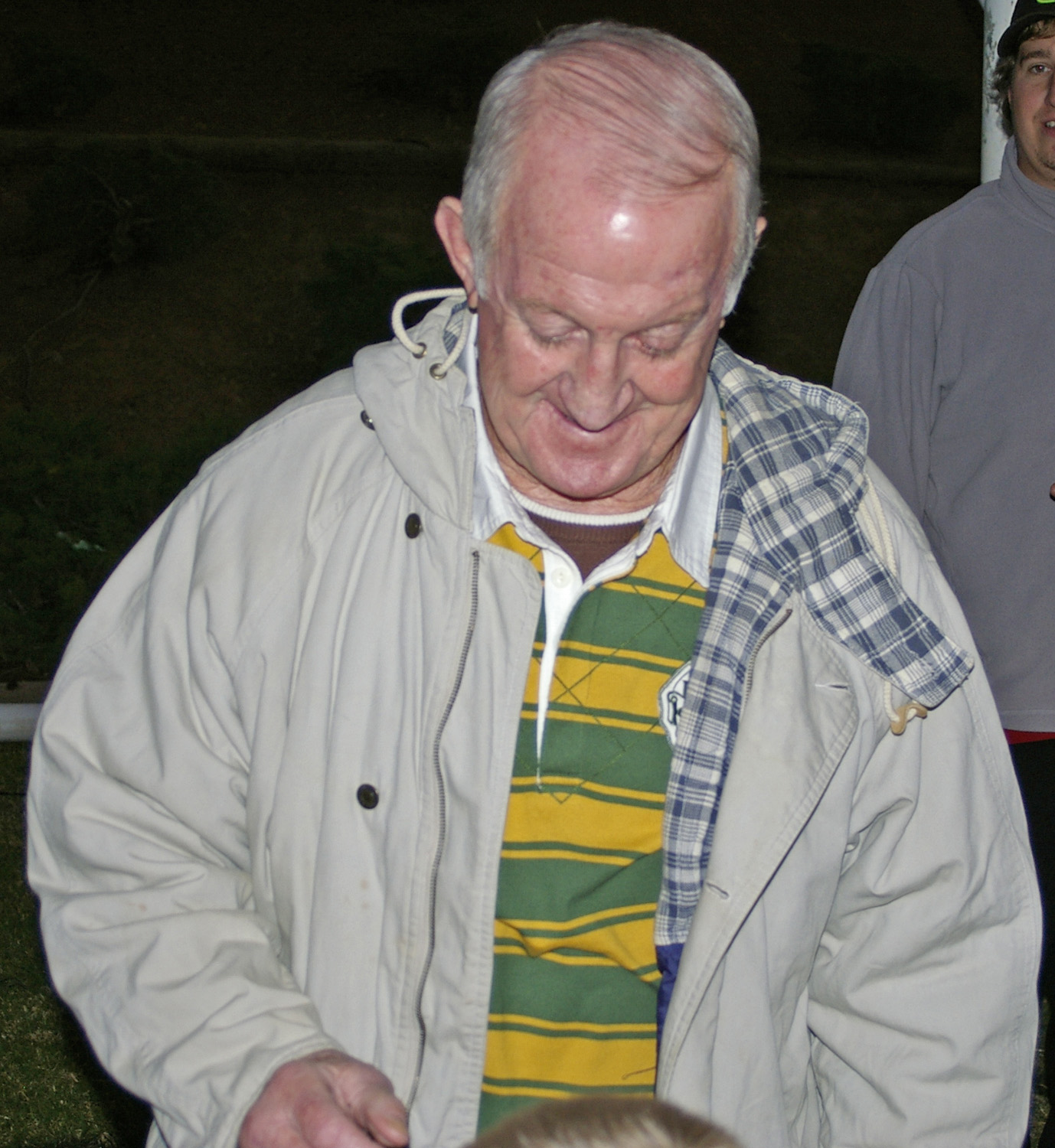
Johnny Raper

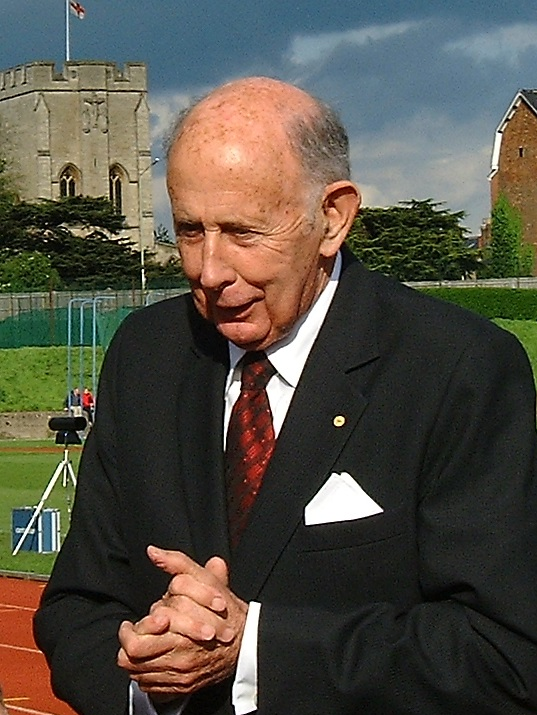
John Landy

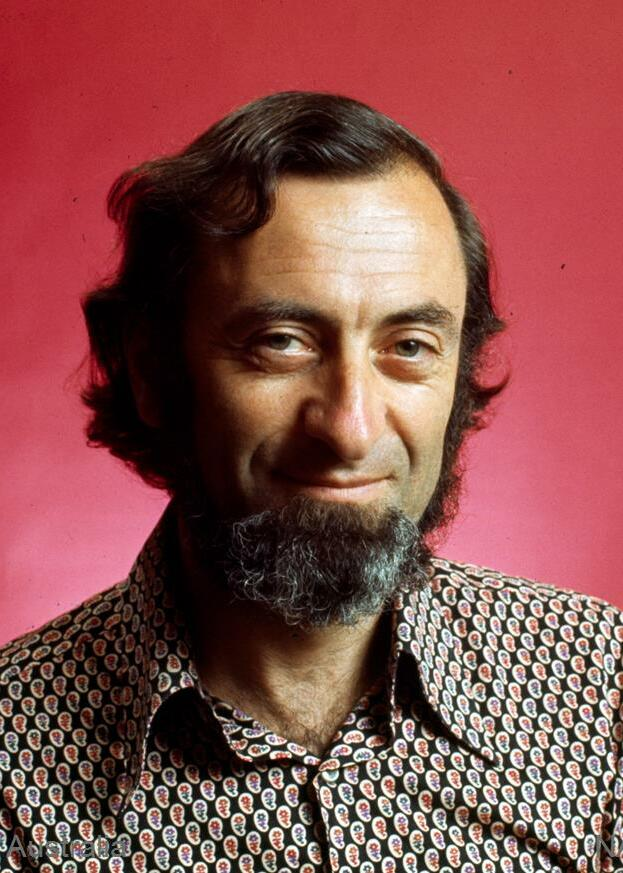
Moss Cass

- 1 February
  - Fred Cook, Australian rules footballer (Footscray) (b. 1947)
  - Glenn Wheatley, musician and manager (b. 1948)
- 2 February – Laurie Mithen, Australian rules footballer (Melbourne) (b. 1934)
- 3 February – Joseph Hitti, Maronite Catholic eparch (born in Lebanon) (b. 1925)
- 5 February – John Bryson, author and lawyer (b. 1935)
- 7 February – Noel Allanson, cricketer and Australian rules footballer (Essendon) (b. 1925)
- 9 February – Johnny Raper, rugby league footballer and coach (b. 1939)
- 11 February – Ken Turner, Australian rules footballer (Collingwood) (b. 1935)
- 12 February – Mark Shulman, rugby league footballer (b. 1951)
- 14 February
  - Joan Croll, physician and radiologist (b. 1928)
  - Mary Willey, Tasmanian politician (b. 1941)
- 17 February
  - Jack Bendat, businessman (born in the United States) (b. 1925)
  - Nigel Berlyn, rear admiral (born in the United Kingdom) (b. 1934)
- 19 February – Nigel Butterley, composer and pianist (b. 1935)
- 20 February – John Bonney, Australian rules footballer (St Kilda) (b. 1946)
- 21 February – Neil Balnaves, film producer and philanthropist (b. 1944)
- 24 February – John Landy, 26th Governor of Victoria and Olympic athlete (b. 1930)
- 25 February – Lorna Fejo, member of the stolen generations (b. 1930)
- 26 February
  - Moss Cass, Victorian politician (b. 1927)
  - Ingo Renner, glider pilot (born in Germany) (b. 1940)

=== March ===
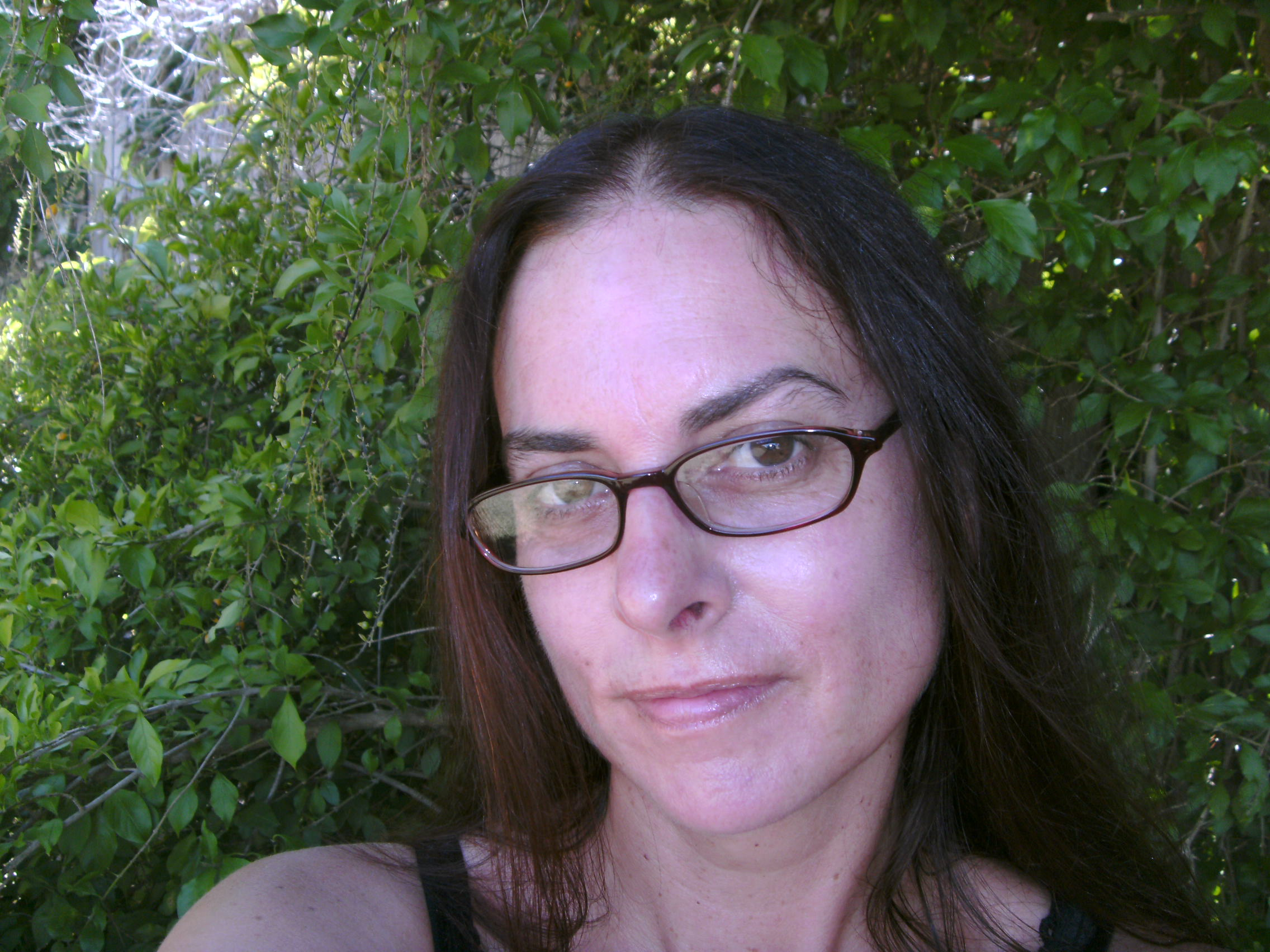
Jordie Albiston

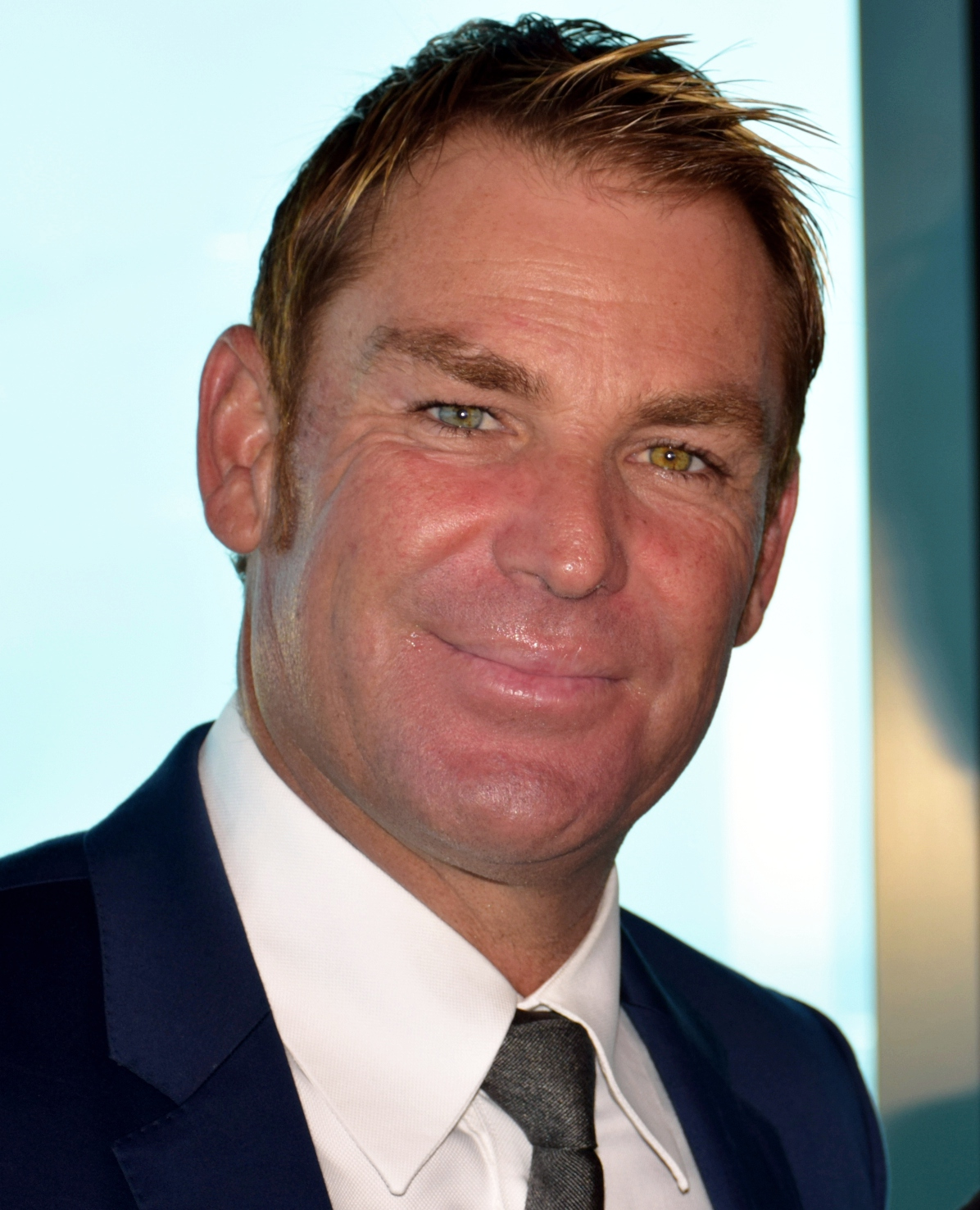
Shane Warne

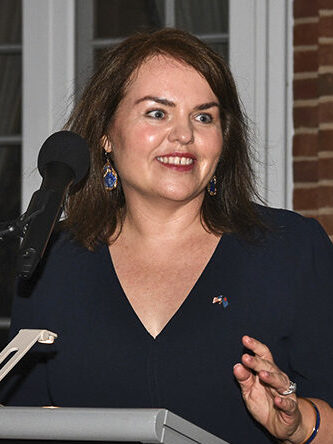
Kimberley Kitching

- 1 March – Jordie Albiston, poet (b. 1961)
- 3 March – Dean Woods, Olympic cyclist (b. 1966)
- 4 March
  - Elsa Klensch, journalist and television presenter (died in the United States) (b. 1930)
  - Rod Marsh, cricketer (b. 1947)
  - Shane Warne, cricketer (died in Thailand) (b. 1969)
- 10 March
  - Ian Hannaford, Australian rules footballer (Port Adelaide) (b. 1940)
  - Kimberley Kitching, Victorian politician (b. 1970)
- 13 March – Peter McMahon, New South Wales politician (b. 1931)
- 14 March – Jason Edwards, rugby league footballer (b. 1969)
- 16 March – Graham McColl, Australian rules footballer (Carlton) (b. 1934)
- 19 March
  - Alan Hopgood, actor, producer and writer (b. 1934)
  - Bruce Rigsby, anthropologist (born in the United States) (b. 1937)
- 22 March – Zipping, racehorse (b. 2001)
- 23 March – Max Walsh, journalist (b. 1937)
- 24 March – John Andrews, architect (b. 1933)
- 26 March – Tom Reynolds, Victorian politician (b. 1936)
- 30 March
  - Bob Brown, New South Wales politician (b. 1933)
  - Ernie Carroll, puppeteer (b. 1929)
  - David Irvine, 10th Director-General of ASIS and 12th Director-General of Security (b. 1947)

=== April ===
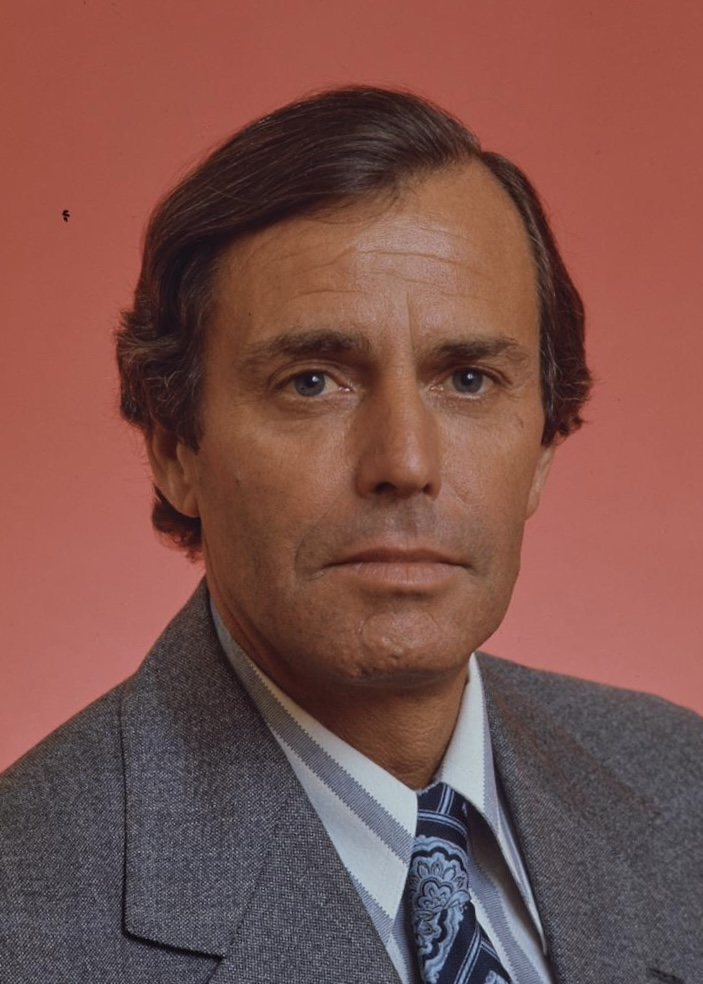
James Webster

- 1 April – Daphne Pirie, athlete and sports administrator (b. 1931)
- 3 April – James Webster, Victorian politician (b. 1925)
- 7 April
  - John Jobling, New South Wales politician (b. 1937)
  - Ken West, music promoter (b. 1958)
- 9 April
  - Chris Bailey, rock singer and musician (born in Kenya) (b. 1957)
  - Inga Freidenfelds, basketballer (born in Latvia) (b. 1935)
  - Allan Trusler, Australian rules footballer (Footscray) (b. 1933)
- 11 April – Bill Ludwig, trade unionist (b. 1934)
- 14 April
  - Irving Davidson, Australian rules footballer (St Kilda) (b. 1929)
  - Chic Henry, car enthusiast, founder of Summernats (b. 1946)
- 15 April
  - Tony Brown, rugby league player (b. 1936)
  - Jack Newton, golfer (b. 1950)
- 18 April – Noel Alford, Australian rules footballer (North Melbourne) (b. 1932)
- 19 April – Sandra Pisani, Olympic field hockey player (b. 1959)
- 21 April – John Rutherford, cricketer (b. 1929)
- 24 April – Kathy Mills, community leader and activist (b. 1936)
- 26 April – Peter Vickery, judge (b. 1950)
- 30 April – Max Riebl, countertenor (b. 1991)

=== May ===
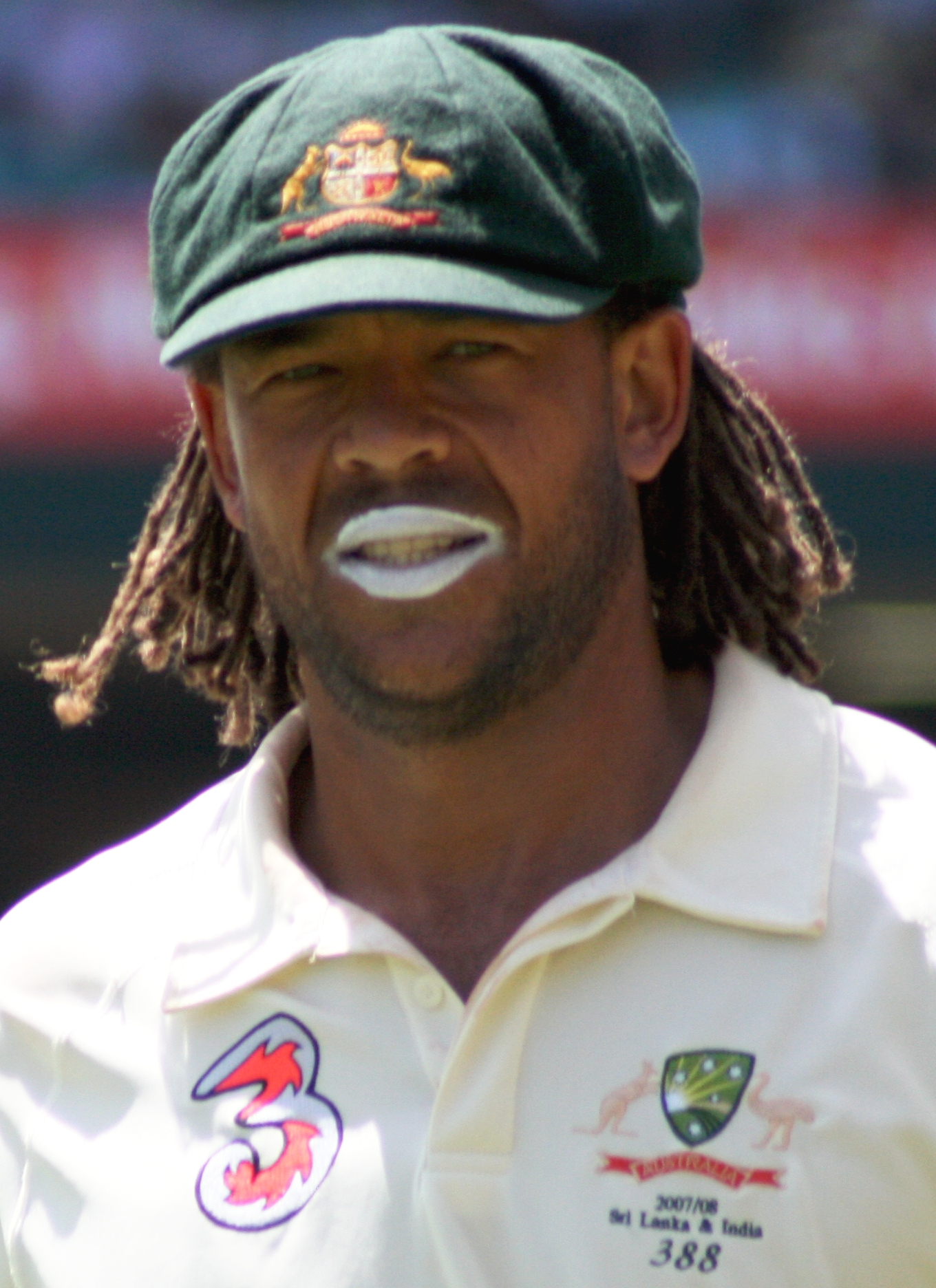
Andrew Symonds

- 4 May
  - Richard Connolly, composer and ABC broadcaster (b. 1927)
  - Wukun Wanambi, painter, filmmaker and curator (b. 1962)
- 5 May – Arthur Tonkin, politician (born 1930)
- 7 May – Bob Barnard, jazz musician (b. 1933)
- 9 May – John Henry Coates, mathematician (died in United Kingdom) (b. 1945)
- 10 May – Jock O'Brien, Australian rules footballer (b. 1937)
- 11 May – John Cripps, horticulturalist (born in United Kingdom) (b. 1927)
- 12 May
  - Ruth Bishop, virologist (b. 1933)
  - Djalu Gurruwiwi, musician (b. c. 1935)
- 14 May – Andrew Symonds, cricketer (b. 1975)
- 15 May
  - Frank Curry, rugby league player and coach (South Sydney) (b. 1950)
  - Ken Mulhall, Australian rules footballer (St Kilda) (b. 1927)
- 20 May – Caroline Jones, television journalist (b. 1938)
- 27 May – Jim Wallis, Australian rules footballer (St Kilda) (b. 1941)
- 29 May – Gary Winram, Olympic swimmer (b. 1936)
- 30 May – Vincent Ryan, Catholic priest and convicted sex offender (b. 1938)

=== June ===
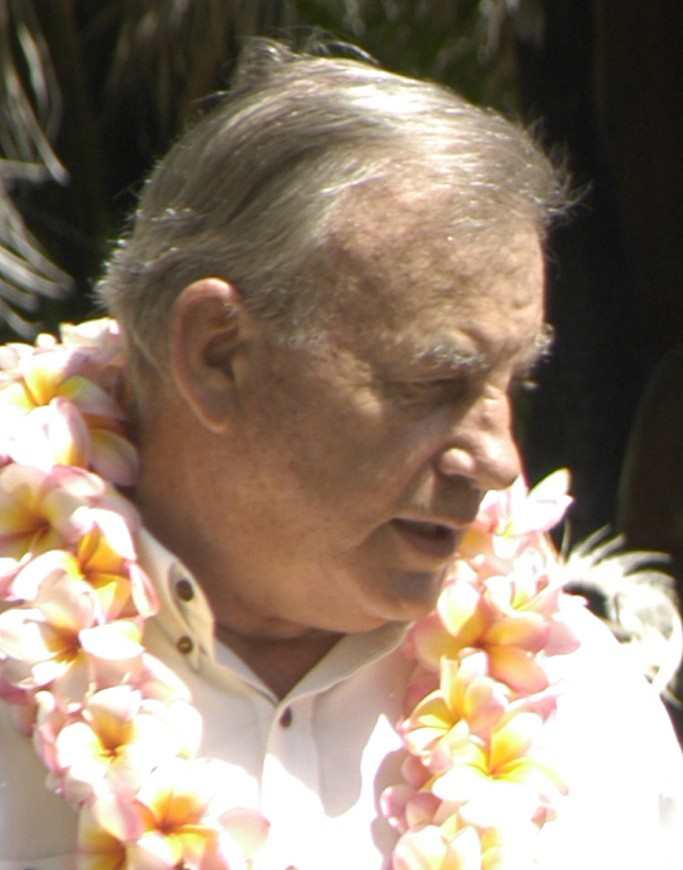
Sir Peter Barter

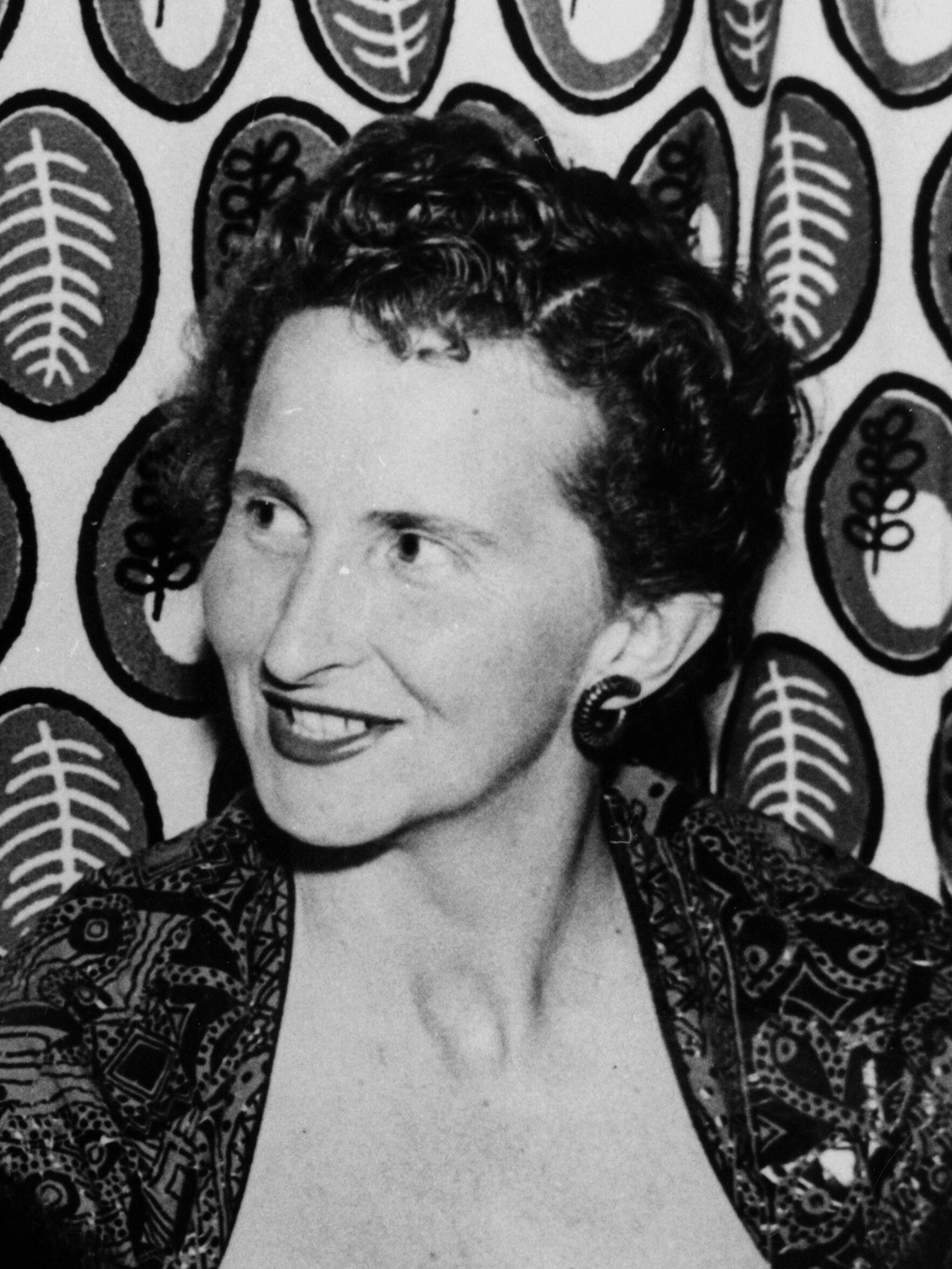
Paula Stafford

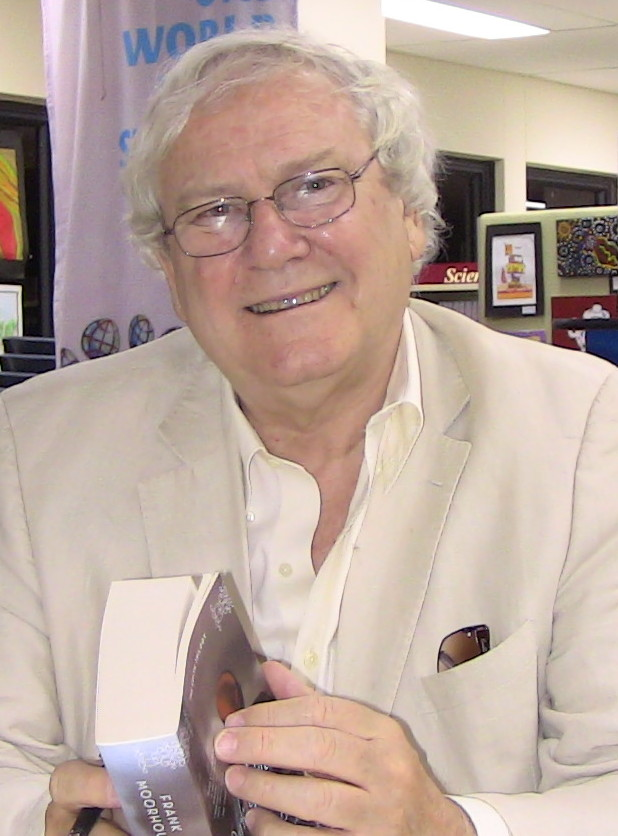
Frank Moorhouse

- 1 June
  - Sir Gerard Brennan, 10th Chief Justice of Australia (b. 1928)
  - John Lloyd, Australian rules footballer (Carlton) (b. 1945)
- 3 June – Roger Scholes, director, writer and cinematographer (b. 1950)
- 4 June – Robert Laurie, rugby league footballer (b. 1956)
- 6 June – Helen Hodgman, novelist (born in the United Kingdom) (b. 1945)
- 7 June
  - Anne Cutler, psycholinguist (died in The Netherlands) (b. 1945)
  - Tommy Dysart, actor (born in the United Kingdom) (b. 1936)
- 8 June – Clive Doyle, Branch Davidian (died in the United States) (b. 1941)
- 13 June – John Rigby, Olympic swimmer (b. 1942)
- 16 June – Tony Boskovic, soccer referee (born in Yugoslavia) (b. 1933)
- 17 June
  - John Mountford, New South Wales politician (b. 1933)
  - Malcolm Skilbeck, educator (b. 1932)
- 19 June
  - Ken Fyffe, Australian rules footballer (North Melbourne) (b. 1938)
  - Carol Raye, actress (born in the United Kingdom) (b. 1923)
- 21 June – Sir Peter Barter, Papua New Guinean businessman and politician (b. 1940)
- 23 June – Paula Stafford, fashion designer (b. 1920)
- 24 June – Neil Chandler, Australian rules footballer (Carlton, St Kilda) (b. 1949)
- 26 June – Frank Moorhouse, writer (b. 1938)
- 28 June – Neville Hayes, Olympic swimmer (b. 1943)
- 29 June – Neil Kerley, Australian rules footballer (b. 1934)
- 30 June – Brian Tomlinson, Australian rules footballer (South Melbourne) (b. 1940)

=== July ===
Jane Garrett

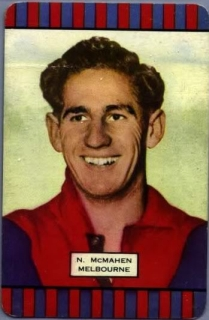
Noel McMahen

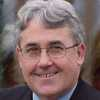
Steve Gibbons

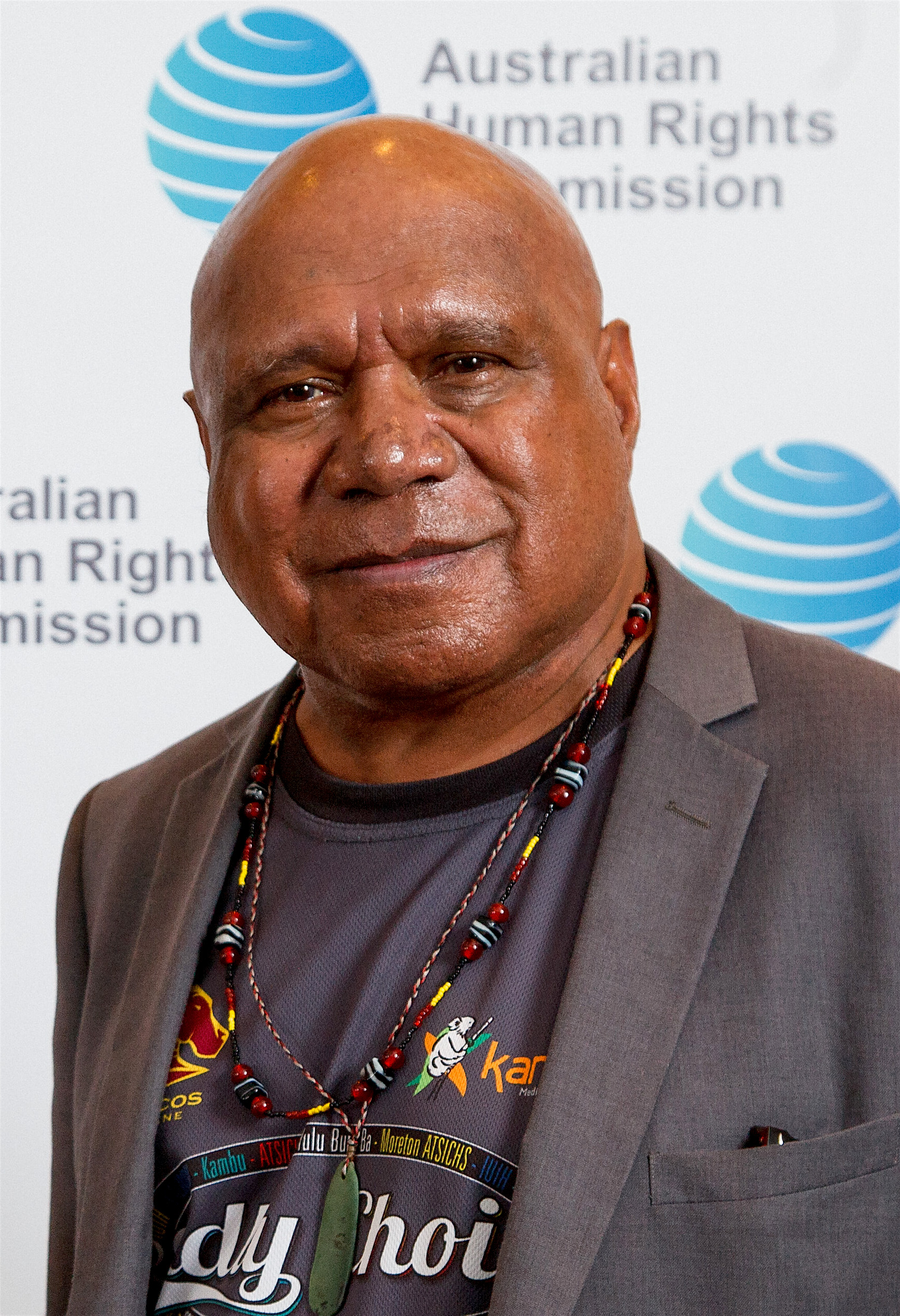
Archie Roach

- 1 July
  - Eddie Brooks, water polo player (b. 1950)
  - Bob King, lawn bowler (b. 1934)
- 2 July – Jane Garrett, Victorian politician (b. 1973)
- 5 July – Elizabeth Grant, anthropologist (b. 1963)
- 6 July – Tricia, Asian elephant (born in South Vietnam) (b. 1957)
- 8 July
  - Robin Dalton, literary agent, film producer and memoirist (b. 1920)
  - Paul Dear, Australian rules footballer (Hawthorn) (b. 1966)
  - Beth Gott, plant physiologist (b. 1922)
- 10 July – Noel McMahen, Australian rules footballer (Melbourne) (b. 1926)
- 11 July – Shirley Cotton, discus thrower (b. 1934)
- 13 July – Colin Stubs, tennis player and promoter (b. 1941)
- 15 July – Terry Fulton, Australian rules footballer (Geelong) (b. 1930)
- 16 July – Sean Quilty, long-distance runner (b. 1966)
- 18 July – Tony Ongarello, Australian rules footballer (Fitzroy) (b. 1932)
- 19 July – Steve Gibbons, Victorian politician (b. 1949)
- 20 July – Stephen Milosz, cricketer (b. 1955)
- 21 July – Justin Crawford, Australian rules footballer (Sydney, Hawthorn) (b. 1977)
- 22 July – Frankie Davidson, singer and actress (b. 1934)
- 23 July
  - Con Britt, Australian rules footballer (Collingwood) (b. 1947)
  - Billy Picken, Australian rules footballer (Collingwood, Sydney) (b. 1956)
- 25 July – Bruce Williams, Australian rules footballer (Carlton) (b. 1939)
- 26 July
  - David Ireland, novelist (b. 1927)
  - William Phillips, water polo player (b. 1943)
  - Laurie Sawle, cricket player and administrator (b. 1925)
- 27 July
  - John Gayler, Queensland politician (b. 1943)
  - Edwin Wilson, poet, painter and scientist (b. 1942)
- 29 July
  - Phil Carlson, cricketer (b. 1951)
  - Arthur Malcolm, Anglican prelate (b. 1934)
- 30 July – Archie Roach, musician (b. 1956)
- 31 July
  - Terry Davies, rower (born in the British Raj) (b. 1933)
  - Herb Henderson, Australian rules footballer (Footscray) (b. 1930)

=== August ===
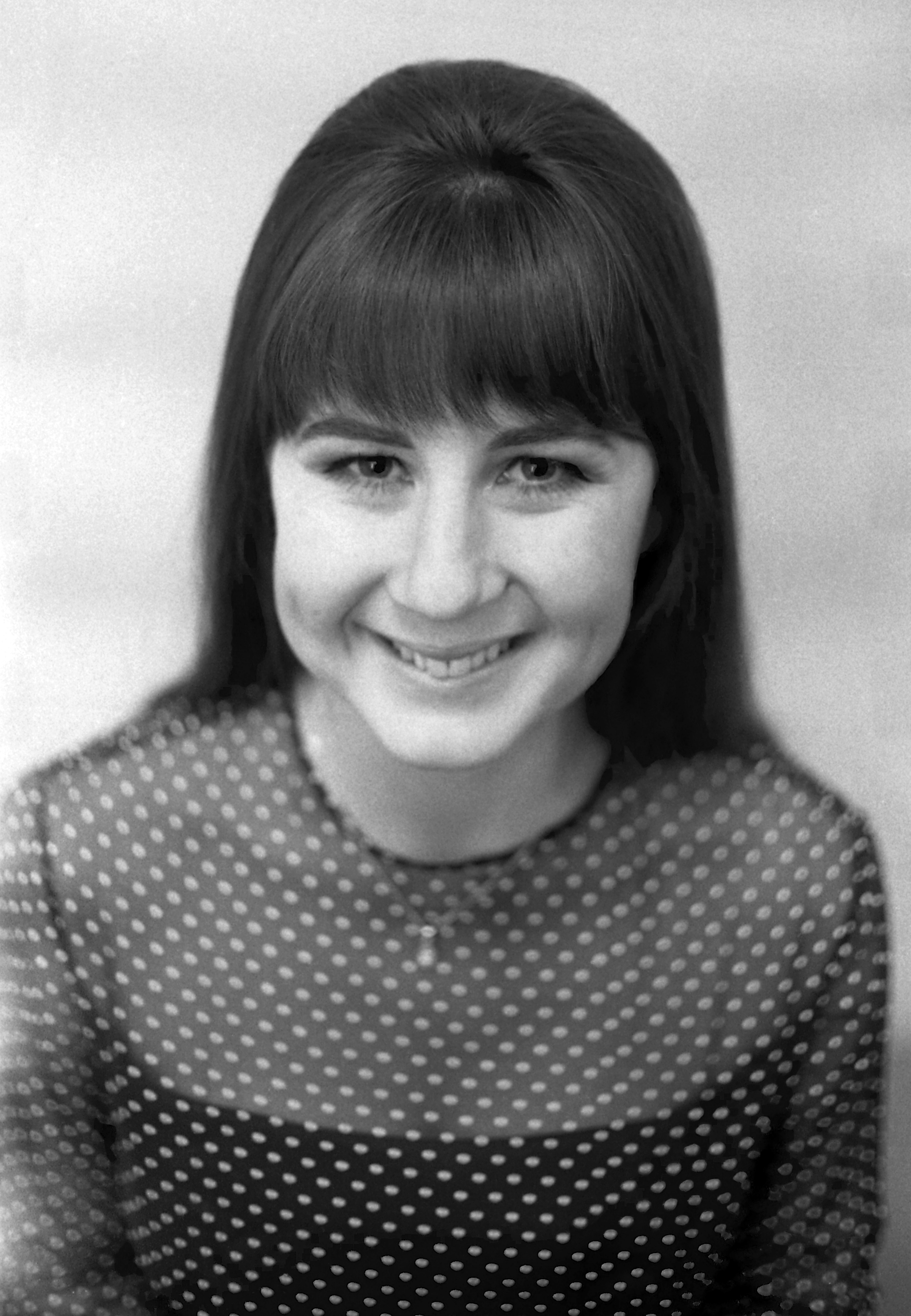
Judith Durham

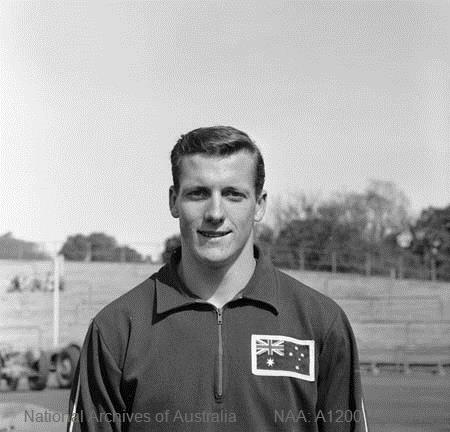
Bob Lay

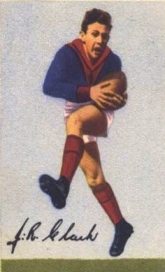
Noel Clarke

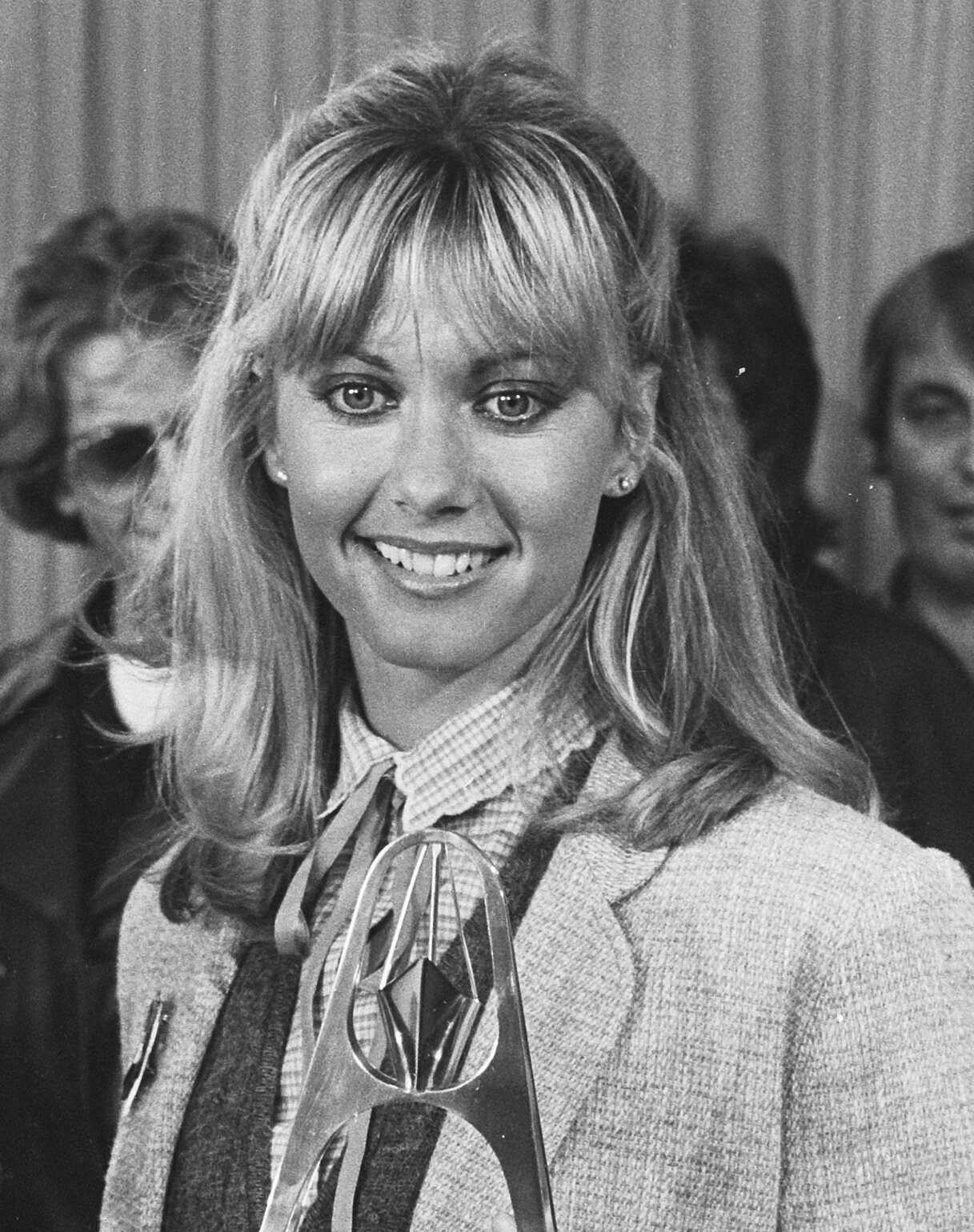
Dame Olivia Newton-John

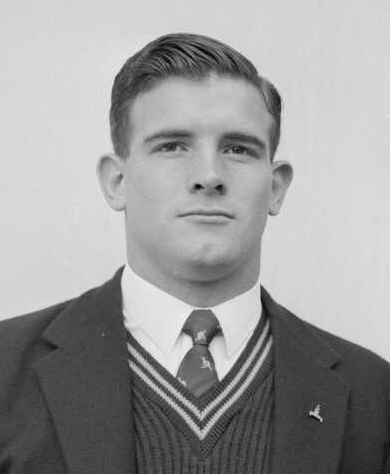
Jim Lenehan

- 1 August – Paul Eenhoorn, actor (died in the United States) (b. 1948)
- 3 August
  - Shirley Barrett, film director (b. 1961)
  - Bruce Grant, writer and journalist (b. 1925)
  - Evan Jones, poet (b. 1931)
- 4 August – Johnny Famechon, boxer (born in France) (b. 1945)
- 5 August
  - Judith Durham, singer (b. 1943)
  - Bob Lay, athlete (b. 1944)
  - John Tingle, New South Wales politician and journalist (b. 1931)
- 7 August
  - Noel Clarke, Australian rules footballer (Melbourne) (b. 1930)
  - Judy Gamin, Queensland politician (b. 1930)
- 8 August – Dame Olivia Newton-John, singer, actress and activist (born in the United Kingdom and died in the United States) (b. 1948)
- 9 August
  - Bernie Crowe, Australian rules footballer (Geelong) (b. 1932)
  - Ian McCausland, artist (b. 1944)
- 11 August
  - Bill Blevin, physician (b. 1929)
  - Arthur Goddard, engineer (born in the United Kingdom) (b. 1921)
  - Paul Green, rugby league footballer and coach (b. 1972)
- 12 August
  - Lillian Frank, hairdresser, philanthropist, and fashion influencer (born in Burma) (b. 1930)
  - Keith Jamieson, country singer (b. 1948)
  - Virginia Spate, art historian (born in the United Kingdom) (b. 1937)
- 14 August – Marshall Napier, actor (born in New Zealand) (b. 1951)
- 16 August – Peter Lloyd, aviator and entrepreneur (b. 1920)
- 17 August
  - Arthur Pound, Australian rules footballer (Melbourne) (b. 1930)
  - Sir David Smith, public servant and Official Secretary to the Governor-General (b. 1933)
- 21 August
  - Vincent Gil, actor (b. 1939)
  - Peter Stone, soccer player (b. 1954)
- 23 August
  - Barbara Cunningham, gymnast (b. 1926)
  - William Doe, gastroenterologist (b. 1941)
- 26 August
  - Dame Valerie Beral, epidemiologist (died in the United Kingdom) (b. 1946)
  - Jim Lenehan, rugby union player (b. 1938)
  - Sue Wills, academic and activist (b. 1944)
- 28 August – Ken Van Heekeren, rugby league footballer (b. unknown)
- 29 August – Craig Powell, poet and psychoanalyst (b. 1940)
- 31 August – Allan Hawke, public servant and diplomat (b. 1948)

=== September ===
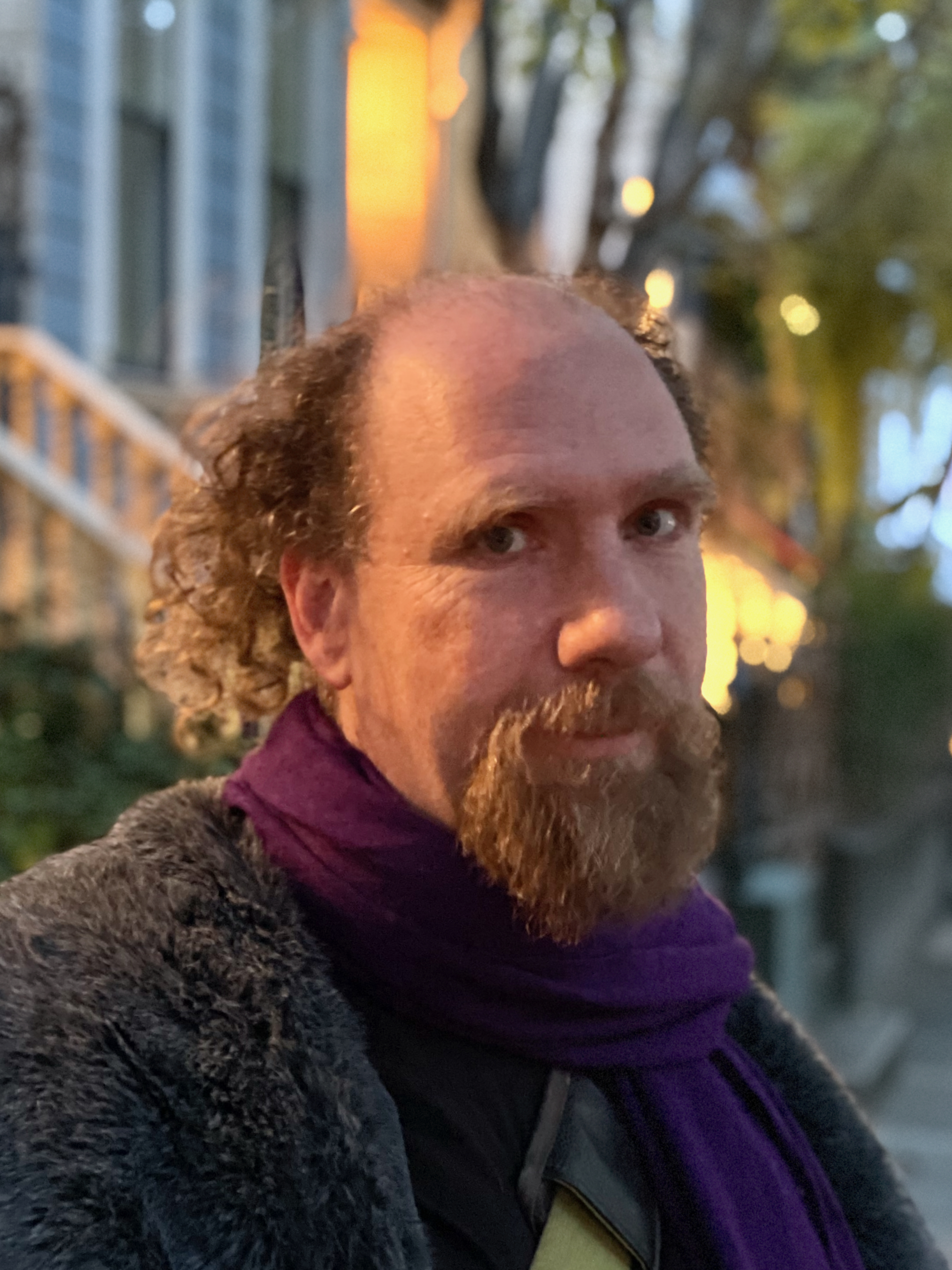
Peter Eckersley

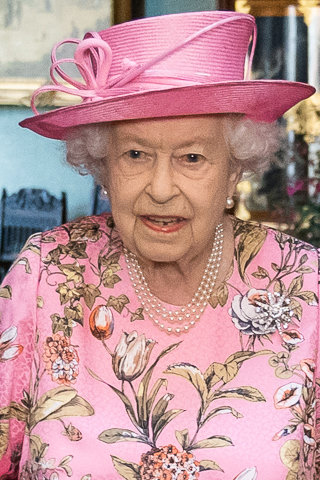
Elizabeth II

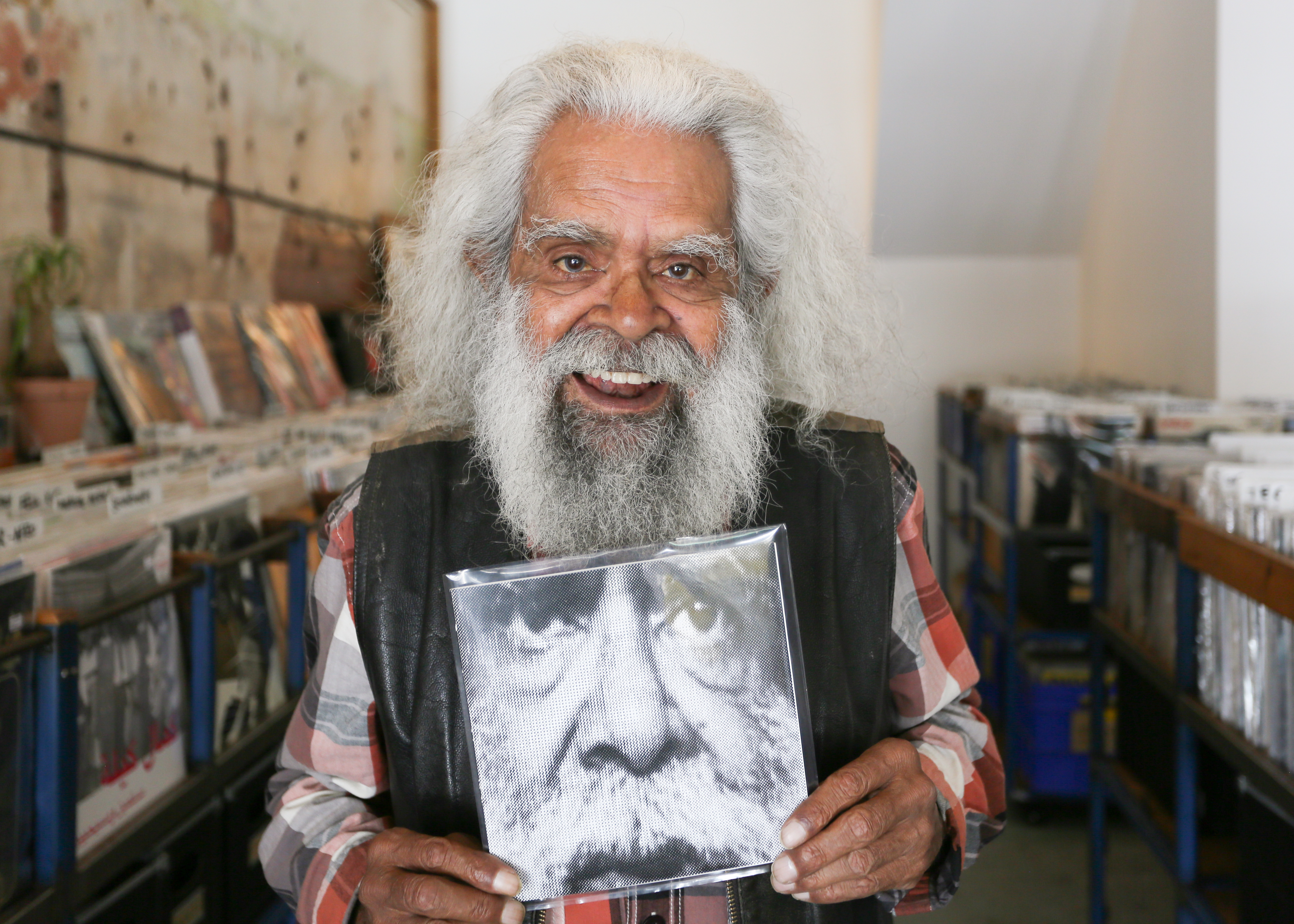
Jack Charles

- 2 September
  - Peter Eckersley, computer scientist and cyber security activist (died in the United States) (b. 1979)
  - Barry Muir, rugby league player and coach (b. 1937)
- 5 September – Shirley McKechnie, dancer and choreographer (b. 1926)
- 8 September
  - Elizabeth II, Queen of Australia (b. 1926)
  - Bobby Keyes, rugby league player (b. 1939)
- 10 September – Mario Bortolotto, Australian rules footballer (Geelong, Carlton) (b. 1957)
- 13 September – Jack Charles, actor and Aboriginal elder (b. 1943)
- 16 September – Allen Aylett, Australian rules footballer (North Melbourne) and administrator (b. 1934)
- 17 September
  - Jim Frazier, inventor, naturalist and cinematographer (b. 1940)
  - Mal Logan, geographer and university administrator (b. 1931)
- 20 September – Peter Yeldham, screenwriter, playwright and novelist (b. 1927)
- 21 September – John Hamblin, actor and television presenter (born in the United Kingdom) (b. 1935)
- 22 September – Raymond Jones, architect and Australian rules footballer (Collingwood, Melbourne) (b. 1925)
- 24 September – Chris Davidson, surfer (b. 1976)
- 28 September – Hilton Deakin, Roman Catholic bishop (b. 1932)

=== October ===
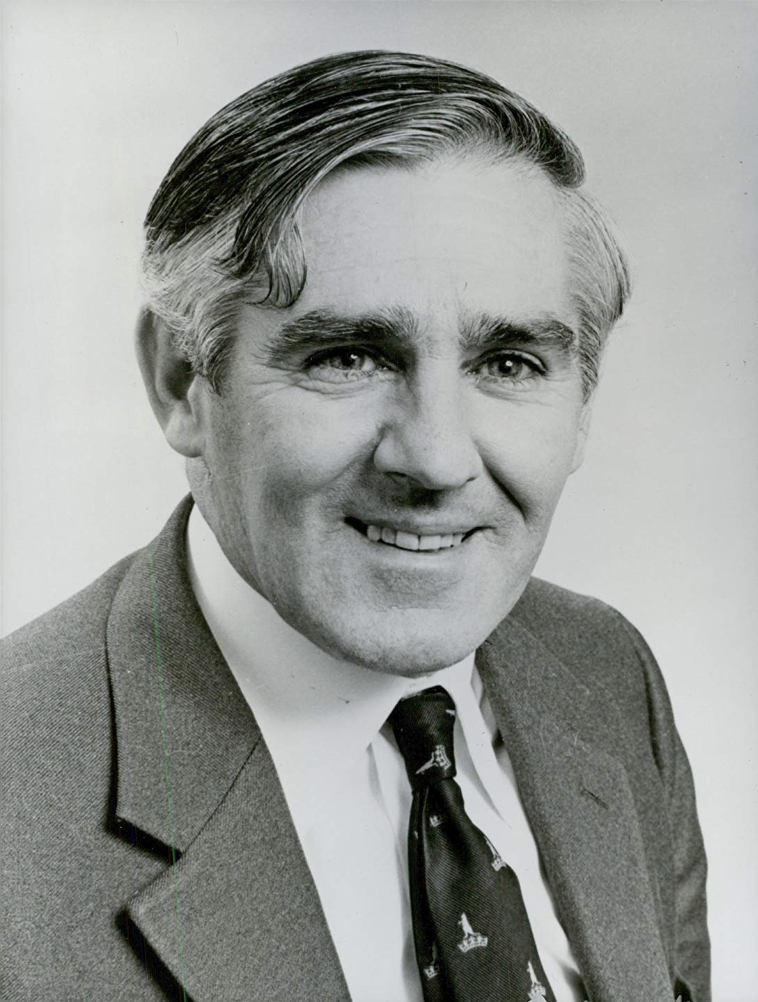
Tony Street

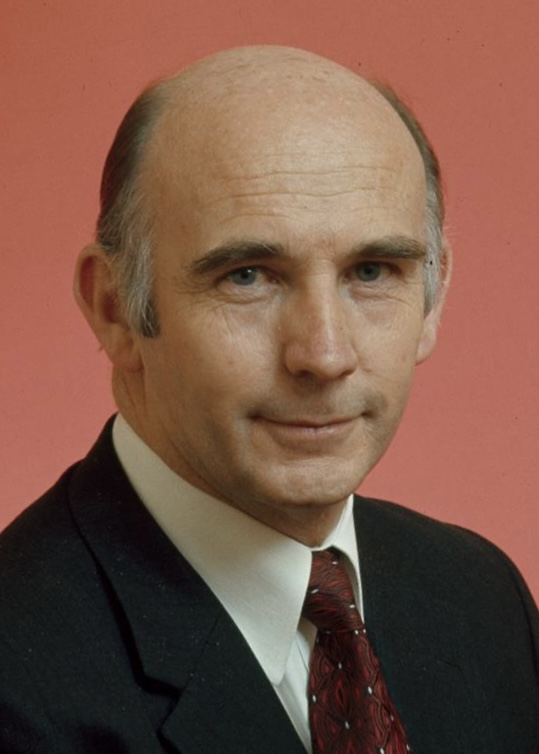
Bob Ellicott

- 1 October – Paul Harriss, Tasmanian politician (b. 1954)
- 5 October – Michael Papps, sport shooter (b. 1932)
- 8 October – Angus Trumble, art curator and historian (b. 1964)
- 9 October – Margie Masters, golfer (died in the United States) (b. 1934)
- 10 October – Allan Wood, Olympic swimmer (b. 1943)
- 13 October – John Spender, New South Wales politician, diplomat and barrister (b. 1935)
- 16 October – Margaret Sumner, lawn bowler (b. 1941)
- 17 October – Dame Carmen Callil, publisher, writer and critic (died in the United Kingdom) (b. 1938)
- 20 October – Travis Basevi, cricket statistician and historian (b. 1975)
- 21 October – Harry White, jockey (b. 1944)
- 22 October – Maurice Rich, athlete (b. 1932)
- 25 October – Tony Street, Victorian politician (b. 1926)
- 29 October – Sir Peter Morris, surgeon (b. 1934)
- 31 October
  - Bob Ellicott, New South Wales politician and judge (b. 1927)
  - Alan Thomson, cricketer (b. 1945)

=== November ===
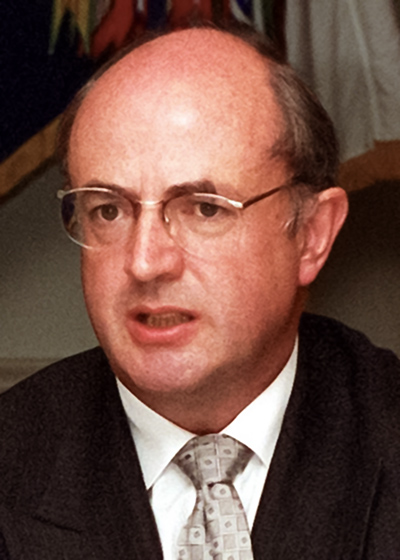
Peter Reith

- 2 November – Nicholas Harding, artist (born in the United Kingdom) (b. 1956)
- 4 November – Mel Leckie, Paralympic cyclist (b. 1984)
- 7 November – Graeme Anderson, Australian rules footballer (Carlton) (b. 1994)
- 8 November
  - Robert Evans, astronomer and Uniting Church minister (b. 1937)
  - Peter Reith, Victorian politician (b. 1950)
- 10 November – Frank Prihoda, alpine skier (born in Czechoslovakia) (b. 1921)
- 13 November – Heather Anderson, Australian rules footballer (Adelaide) (b. 1994)
- 15 November – Alison Megarrity, New South Wales politician (b. 1961)
- 18 November
  - Derek Denton, biochemist (b. 1924)
  - Sever Sternhell, organic chemist (born in Poland) (b. 1930)
- 24 November – Margaret Hamilton, publisher and writer (b. 1941)
- 25 November
  - Billy Gordon, Queensland politician (b. 1973)
  - Beryl Kimber, violinist and educator (b. 1928)
- 26 November – Chris Mitchell, Australian rules footballer (Geelong) (b. 1947)
- 27 November – James Wright, medical doctor and media personality (b. 1927)
- 28 November
  - Jean Calder, humanitarian doctor (died in Palestine) (b. 1932/33)
  - Jim Cody, rugby league player (b. 1943)
  - Sandy Dawson, barrister (b. 1972)
- 30 November – Anne Green, swimming coach (b. 1951)

=== December ===
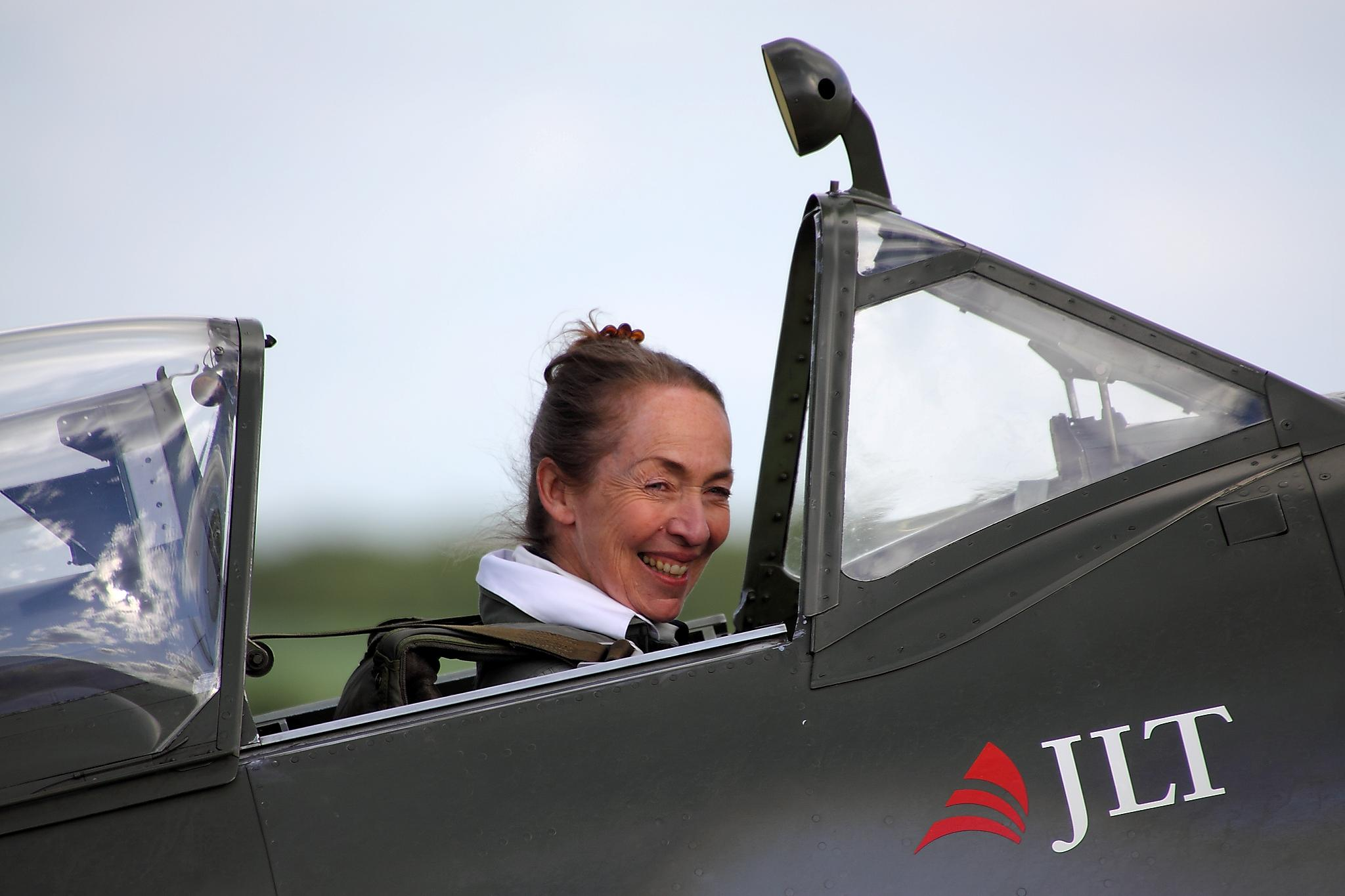
Carolyn Grace

- 2 December
  - Carolyn Grace, pilot
  - Jill Jolliffe, journalist (b. 1945)
- 3 December – Antigone Kefala, poet (born in Romania) (b. 1935)
- 12 December – Alexander Floyd, botanist (b. 1926)
- 16 December – Robert Adamson, poet (b. 1943)
- 17 December – Lawrence Costa, Northern Territory politician
- 21 December – Tony Barry, actor (b. 1941)
- 24 December – Barry Round, Australian rules footballer (b. 1950)
- 28 December – Joan Sydney, actress (born in England) (b. 1936)
- 31 December – Cary Young, quiz champion (born in New Zealand) (b. 1939)

== Public holidays ==
| Holiday | Date | ACT | NSW | NT | QLD | SA | TAS | VIC | WA | Ref. |
|---|---|---|---|---|---|---|---|---|---|---|
| New Year's Day | Saturday 1 January | Yes | Yes | Yes | Yes | No | No | Yes | Yes | |
| New Year's Day in lieu | Monday 3 January | Yes | Yes | Yes | Yes | Yes | Yes | Yes | Yes | |
| Australia Day | Wednesday 26 January | Yes | Yes | Yes | Yes | Yes | Yes | Yes | Yes | |
| Royal Hobart Regatta (only observed in certain areas of the state) | Monday 4 February | No | No | No | No | No | Yes | No | No | |
| Labour Day (WA) | Monday 7 March | No | No | No | No | No | No | No | Yes | |
| Public holiday under different names | Monday 14 March | Canberra Day | No | No | No | Adelaide Cup Day | Eight Hours Day | Labour Day | No | |
| Good Friday | Friday 15 April | Yes | Yes | Yes | Yes | Yes | Yes | Yes | Yes | |
| Easter Saturday | Saturday 16 April | Yes | Yes | Yes | Yes | Yes | No | Yes | No | |
| Easter Sunday | Sunday 17 April | Yes | Yes | No | Yes | No | No | Yes | No | |
| Easter Monday | Monday 18 April | Yes | Yes | Yes | Yes | Yes | Yes | Yes | Yes | |
| Easter Tuesday | Tuesday 19 April | No | No | No | No | No | Yes | No | No | |
| ANZAC Day | Monday 25 April | Yes | Yes | Yes | Yes | Yes | Yes | Yes | Yes | |
| May Day | Monday 2 May | No | No | Yes | Yes | No | No | No | No | |
| Reconciliation Day | Monday 30 May | Yes | No | No | No | No | No | No | No | |
| Western Australia Day | Monday 6 June | No | No | No | No | No | No | No | Yes | |
| Queen's Birthday | Monday 13 June | Yes | Yes | Yes | No | Yes | Yes | Yes | No | |
| Picnic Day | Monday 1 August | No | No | Yes | No | No | No | No | No | |
| Royal Queensland Show (Brisbane area only) | Wednesday 10 August | No | No | No | Yes | No | No | No | No | |
| National Day of Mourning | Thursday 22 September | Yes | Yes | Yes | Yes | Yes | Yes | Yes | Yes | |
| Friday before the AFL Grand Final | Friday 23 September | No | No | No | No | No | No | Yes | No | |
| King's Birthday | Monday 26 September | No | No | No | No | No | No | No | Yes | |
| Labour Day | Monday 3 October | Yes | Yes | No | Queen's Birthday | Yes | No | No | No | |
| Melbourne Cup | Tuesday 1 November | No | No | No | No | No | No | Yes | No | |
| Recreation Day (all parts of the state which do not observe Royal Hobart Regatta) | Monday 7 November | No | No | No | No | No | Yes | No | No | |
| Christmas Eve (from 7pm to 12 midnight) | Saturday 24 December | No | No | Yes | Yes | Yes | No | No | No | |
| Christmas Day | Sunday 25 December | Yes | Yes | Yes | Yes | Yes | Yes | Yes | Yes | |
| Boxing Day | Monday 26 December | Yes | Yes | Yes | Yes | Yes | Yes | Yes | Yes | |
| Christmas Day in lieu | Tuesday 27 December | Yes | Yes | Yes | Yes | Yes | Yes | Yes | Yes | |
| New Year's Eve (from 7pm to 12 midnight) | Saturday 31 December | No | No | Yes | No | Yes | No | No | No | |

== See also ==
=== Country overviews ===
- 2020s in Australia political history
- History of Australia
- History of modern Australia
- Outline of Australia
- Government of Australia
- Politics of Australia
- Years in Australia
- Timeline of Australia history
- 2022 in Australian literature
- 2022 in Australian television
- List of Australian films of 2022
