= Barry van Heekeren =

Australian rugby league footballer, coach and administrator

Barry Van Heekeren
Personal information
- Full name: Barry James Van Heekeren
- Born: 7 March 1932 Paddington, New South Wales
- Died: 25 January 2004 (aged 71) Sydney, New South Wales, Australia

Playing information
- Position: Hooker
Club
Years	Team	Pld	T	G	FG	P
1955	St. George	5	0	0	0	0

Coaching information
Club
Years	Team	Gms	W	D	L	W%
1968–73	Papua New Guinea	2	0	0	0	0
- Source: Whiticker/Hudson
- Relatives: Ken van Heekeren (brother)

Barry Van Heekeren (1932–2004) was an Australian rugby league footballer who played in the 1950s.

== Playing career ==
An Eastern Suburbs junior and lower grade player in the early 1950s, Barry Van Heekeren joined St. George third grade in 1955 and was used 5 times during the 1955 season in first grade. He later returned to Easts as an administrator, and after 30 years as Operations Manager at the Roosters, he was awarded Life Membership in 2002.

== Coaching career ==
Known by the nickname 'Mocca', Barry Van Heekeren was also the coach of the Papua New Guinea national rugby league team in 1968 and 1973.

== Death ==
Barry Van Heekeren died on 25 January 2004.
