= Eddie Brooks =

Australian water polo player (1950–2022)

Personal information
- Nationality: Australian
- Born: 2 June 1950
- Died: 1 July 2022 (aged 72)

Sport
- Sport: Water polo

Eddie Brooks (2 June 1950 – 1 July 2022) was an Australian water polo player. He competed in the men's tournament at the 1976 Summer Olympics.
