= Travis Basevi =

Australian Sports Data Statistician and Developer (1975–2022)

Travis Basevi (17 March 1975 – 20 October 2022) was an Australian web developer, cricket data analyst, cricket statistician and historian. He created Cricinfo's StatsGuru tool, which became one of the most popular cricket data-analysis tools. He also played a major role in compilation of the site's database of scorecards, created its content management system and contributed many articles.

== Personal life ==
Basevi was born in March 1975 in Geelong, Australia. He moved to London in 2000 and initially lived in Kilburn. He continued to live in North London with his wife and son.

== Career ==
Bavesi first became involved with Cricinfo through Internet Relay Chat as a teenager in the 1990s, while still pursuing his studies in Sydney. He worked as a volunteer to publish scorecards for the site Cricinfo, and collaborated with Vishal Misra to build the Test and ODI scorecard database in 1995, and together they designed the site's first scorecard format.

He created StatsGuru in 2000, which was built largely from scripts that went through the scorecards to create live stats.

Having left Cricinfo for the first time in 2001, he returned to cricket when hired by Wisden in spring 2002 as part of their wisden.com venture. During this time he developed and launched a rival to Statsguru - The Wisden Wizard. On the eve of the 2003 Cricket World Cup, Wisden acquired Cricinfo and he was back working on his old site and code base.

He built the Cricinfo content management system, which went live in April 2005 and is still in use. Once Cricinfo was acquired by ESPN in 2007, Travis built StatsGuru for rugby union as part of the ESPNscrum.com website relaunch in September 2008 (it proved a vital statistical resource for journalists and broadcasters until it was taken down in 2020) and was a key member of the team that built and launched ESPNF1.com in December 2009 and ESPN.co.uk in January 2010.

Having parted ways with ESPN and Cricinfo for the second time in 2016, he began a stint as a Chief Technology Officer at CricViz, building the database and tools which underpin the statistical analysis of the company.

== Death ==
He died at the age of 47, two years after being diagnosed with cancer.
