= Ken Fyffe =

Australian rules footballer (1938–2022)

Personal information
- Full name: Kenneth Charles Donald Fyffe
- Born: 14 March 1938
- Died: 19 June 2022 (aged 84); Melbourne
- Original team: Redan / Ballarat
- Height: 178 cm (5 ft 10 in)
- Weight: 80 kg (176 lb)
- Position: Halfback flank

Playing career^{1}
Years	Club	Games (Goals)
1958–61	North Melbourne	37 (3)
- ^{1} Playing statistics correct to the end of 1961.

Kenneth Charles Donald Fyffe (14 March 1938 – 19 June 2022) was an Australian rules footballer who played with North Melbourne in the Victorian Football League (VFL).
