= Bernie Crowe =

Australian rules footballer (1932–2022)

Personal information
- Full name: Bernard John Crowe
- Born: 28 November 1932
- Died: 9 August 2022 (aged 89)
- Original team: St Arnaud
- Height: 194 cm (6 ft 4 in)
- Weight: 83 kg (183 lb)
- Position: Ruck

Playing career^{1}
Years	Club	Games (Goals)
1957	Geelong	9 (3)
- ^{1} Playing statistics correct to the end of 1957.

Bernard John Crowe (28 November 1932 – 9 August 2022) was an Australian rules footballer who played for the Geelong Football Club in the Victorian Football League (VFL).
