= Carolyn Grace =

Australian aircraft restorer and pilot (1951/1952–2022)

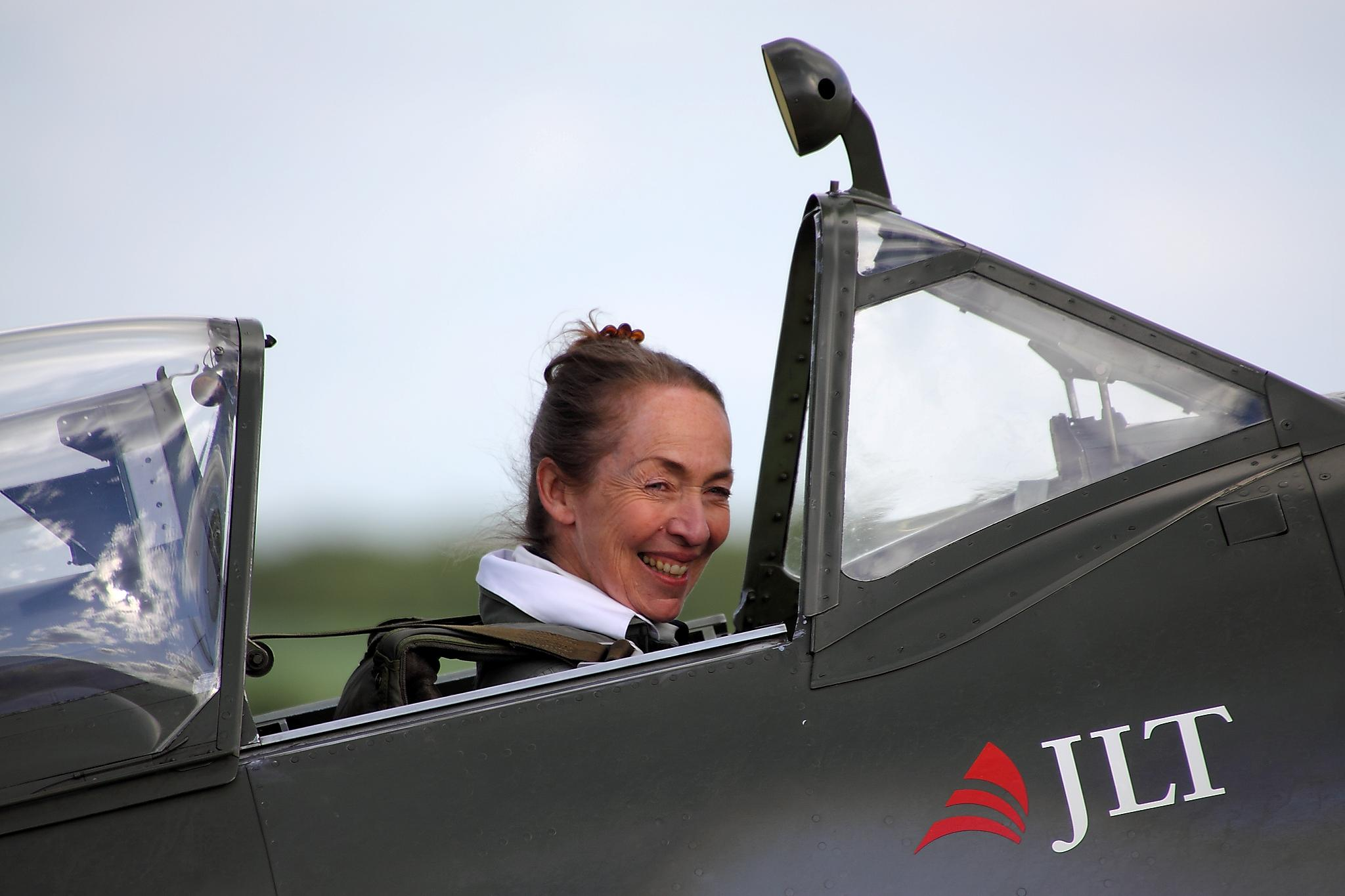
Grace at Duxford Airshow 2011

Carolyn Grace (8 January 1952 – 2 December 2022) was an Australian pilot, businesswoman, mother of two, and aircraft restorer; and one of two qualified female pilots of the Supermarine Spitfire since World War II.

== Early life ==
Grace grew up on a farm in New South Wales, where air travel was an essential part of everyday travel to cover long distances in rural Australia. In 1979, her husband Nick found two Spitfires for sale, and decided to buy them. They continued the restoration work in the 1980s, while Grace learned to fly a biplane.

== Pilot career ==
Following Nick's death after a car crash in 1988, Grace learned to fly the Spitfire. In 1990, she made her first solo Spitfire flight and qualified as a pilot for the aircraft. While female pilots had flown the Spitfire during World War II as part of the Air Transport Auxiliary, Grace was the first qualified female pilot ever to take part in display flying, leading others to follow.

Though she was pressured not to take up solo flying as a widow with two children, Grace felt she needed to commemorate her late husband. She subsequently accumulated 900 flying hours, performing at various air shows and memorial events. The Spitfire ML407, which she and her husband had restored to working order, became known as the "Grace Spitfire". The aircraft was kept at RAF Bentwaters, Woodbridge, Suffolk, and Aon, who sponsored her events, met the expensive insurance costs.

In 2004, Grace flew this Spitfire over Chartwell, the former residence of Winston Churchill, to commemorate the 60th anniversary of D-Day. In 2011, she flew the plane on the 75th anniversary of the Spitfire's first flight in 1936.

Grace died after a car accident at Goulburn, New South Wales, on 2 December 2022, at the age of 70.
