= Sandy Dawson =

Australian barrister (1972–2022)

Alexander Tamerlane Sinclair Dawson SC (c.1972 – 28 November 2022) was an Australian barrister who specialised in the law of defamation.

Dawson was educated at St Paul's College, University of Sydney. He was called to the bar in 2003 and was a founding member of Banco Chambers, Sydney in 2004. In 2016 he was appointed Senior Counsel. He was involved in a process to reform Australia's defamation laws.

Dawson represented a variety of media organisations, as well as Labor MP Emma Husar against BuzzFeed in 2019.

Dawson's sister Katrina was also a barrister. She was shot dead in the 2014 Lindt Cafe siege.

Dawson was married with four children. He died of brain cancer on 28 November 2022, aged 50.
