= Graham McColl =

Australian rules footballer (1934–2022)

Personal information
- Full name: Graham Douglas McColl
- Born: 18 June 1934
- Died: 16 March 2022 (aged 87); Geelong
- Original team: Coburg
- Height: 189 cm (6 ft 2 in)
- Weight: 82 kg (181 lb)

Playing career^{1}
Years	Club	Games (Goals)
1958	Carlton	10 (4)
- ^{1} Playing statistics correct to the end of 1958.

Graham Douglas McColl (18 June 1934 – 16 March 2022) was an Australian rules footballer who played with Carlton in the Victorian Football League (VFL). His career ended abruptly during a night game against St Kilda with a ruptured ACL knee injury that could not be repaired. Originally from Coburg Football Club in the Victorian Football Association (VFA) he played 70 games and won a best & fairest for the club in 1956.
