= Keith Goullet =

Australian rules footballer (1932–2022)

Personal information
- Full name: Keith Goullet
- Born: 22 September 1932
- Died: 5 January 2022 (aged 89)
- Height: 169 cm (5 ft 7 in)
- Weight: 73 kg (161 lb)

Playing career^{1}
Years	Club	Games (Goals)
1955	North Melbourne	1 (1)
- ^{1} Playing statistics correct to the end of 1955.

Keith Goullet (22 September 1932 – 5 January 2022) was an Australian rules footballer who played with North Melbourne in the Victorian Football League (VFL). Goullet died on 5 January 2022, at the age of 89.
