= Geoff Wilson (Australian footballer) =

Australian rules footballer (1940–2022)

Personal information
- Full name: Geoffrey Robert Wilson
- Born: 2 January 1940; Richmond, Victoria
- Died: 12 January 2022 (aged 82); Shepparton, Victoria
- Original team: Canterbury
- Height: 168 cm (5 ft 6 in)
- Weight: 70 kg (154 lb)

Playing career^{1}
Years	Club	Games (Goals)
1958–60	Hawthorn	31 (30)
- ^{1} Playing statistics correct to the end of 1960.

Geoffrey Robert Wilson (2 January 1940 – 12 January 2022) was an Australian rules footballer who played with Hawthorn in the Victorian Football League (VFL). Wilson died on 12 January 2022, at the age of 82.
