= Brian Tomlinson =

Australian rules footballer (1940–2022)

Personal information
- Full name: Brian Tomlinson
- Born: 22 August 1940
- Died: 30 June 2022 (aged 81)
- Original team: Warrandyte
- Height: 180 cm (5 ft 11 in)
- Weight: 81 kg (179 lb)

Playing career^{1}
Years	Club	Games (Goals)
1961–62	South Melbourne	15 (0)
- ^{1} Playing statistics correct to the end of 1962.

Brian Tomlinson (22 August 1940 – 30 June 2022) was an Australian rules footballer who played with South Melbourne in the Victorian Football League (VFL). He played for Warrandyte Football Club in the Eastern Football League before and after his stint at South Melbourne.
