= Colin Harburn =

Australian cricketer (1938–2022)

Personal information
- Full name: Colin Malcolm Harburn
- Born: 3 September 1938; Perth, Western Australia
- Died: 12 January 2022 (aged 83); Fremantle, Western Australia
- Batting: Right-handed
- Bowling: Right-arm leg-spin
- Role: Batsman

Domestic team information
- Years: Team
- 1961/62 to 1964/65: Western Australia
- Source: Cricinfo, 6 November 2017

Colin Malcolm Harburn (3 September 1938 – 12 January 2022) was an Australian cricketer. He played seven first-class matches for Western Australia from 1961/62 to 1964/65. His highest score was 139 against an Australian XI at the WACA Ground in April 1964.
