= William Doe =

Australian-born gastroenterologist (1941–2022)

- Born: 6 May 1941; Sydney, Australia
- Died: 23 August 2022 (aged 81)
- Education: Newington College; University of Sydney; University of London; The Scripps Research Institute
- Occupations: Provost Aga Khan University, former Dean of Medicine, University of Birmingham
- Spouse: Dallas McIntosh
- Children: 3

William Fairbank Doe (6 May 1941 – 23 August 2022) was an Australian-born gastroenterologist who was Provost of the Aga Khan University and professor of medicine and Dean of the University of Birmingham Medical School. From 1993 until 2001 he was the senior editor of the Journal of Gastroenterology and Hepatology. His scientific output includes over 150 scientific research publications in international scientific journals. Since 1999 Doe has been a Fellow of the Academy of Medical Sciences, United Kingdom. He was President of the Gastroenterological Society of Australia from 1989 until 1991.

== Early life ==
Doe graduated in medicine from the University of Sydney in 1965.

== Medical career ==
- Professor – School of Medical Research, Australian National University (1989-1998)
- Professor – Faculty of Medicine, University of Sydney (1994-1998)
- Dean – School of Medicine, University of Birmingham (1998-2007)

== Personal life and death ==
Doe died on 23 August 2022, at the age of 81.
