= Arthur Pound =

Australian rules footballer (1930–2022)

Personal information
- Full name: Arthur Joseph Pound
- Born: 19 March 1930
- Died: 17 August 2022 (aged 92)
- Original team: McKinnon

Playing career^{1}
Years	Club	Games (Goals)
1950	Melbourne	7 (12)
1953–1956	Brighton (VFA)	60 (76)
- ^{1} Playing statistics correct to the end of 1956.

Arthur Joseph Pound (19 March 1930 – 17 August 2022) was an Australian rules footballer who played for the Melbourne Football Club in the Victorian Football League (VFL).
