= Ken Van Heekeren =

Australian rugby league player (1933–2022)

Personal information
- Born: 30 June 1933
- Died: 25 August 2022 (aged 89)

Playing information
- Position: Five-eighth, centre, halfback, wing
Club
Years	Team	Pld	T	G	FG	P
1953–58	Eastern Suburbs	60	18	0	0	54
- Relatives: Barry van Heekeren (brother)

Ken Van Heekeren (30 June 1933 – 25 August 2022) was an Australian rugby league footballer who played as a five-eighth and centre in the 1950s. He made 60 appearances for the Eastern Suburbs in the New South Wales Rugby Football League (NSWRFL) competition between 1953 and 1958.

== Career ==
As an Eastern Suburbs junior, Van Heekeren played for Woollahra Waratahs. On 4 April 1953, he made his first-grade NSWRFL debut, scoring a try in a 23–10 defeat to Parramatta at Cumberland Oval. During the 1953 season, he was the club's joint-top try scorer with eight tries, along with Morrie Kermond and Col Donohoe. Van Heekeren's 1954 season was ended by injury after dislocating his shoulder. He did not play first-grade competition until the 1957 season, after returning from a two-year stint in Wollongong.

The 1958 season was Van Heekeren's last as Eastern Suburbs player. That year, he made 16 appearances, scoring one try in the last game of the regular season, a 38–7 win over Parramatta at Sydney Sports Ground.

Van Heekeren died in August 2022.
