= Faculty of Fine Arts, University of Lucknow =

Art college in Lucknow, India

- Former names: School of Industrial Design (1892–1917); Government College School of Arts and Crafts (1917–1975)
- Type: Public
- Established: 1911; 115 years ago
- Affiliations: University of Lucknow
- Faculty: 22
- Students: 626 (2012)
- Undergraduates: 264
- Postgraduates: 78
- Location: Lucknow, Uttar Pradesh, India; 26.8626145°N 80.9329208°E
- Campus: Urban
- Nickname: Arts College

Faculty of Fine Arts, University of Lucknow, also known as the Lucknow College of Arts and Crafts (LCAC) or Government College of Arts and Crafts (GCAC) or simply the College of Arts and Crafts (CAC), is an art college for advanced training in visual arts established in 1911. A constituent college of the University of Lucknow specializing in fine arts, commercial art, and sculpture, the Faculty of Fine Arts is currently headed by Ratan Kumar as dean.

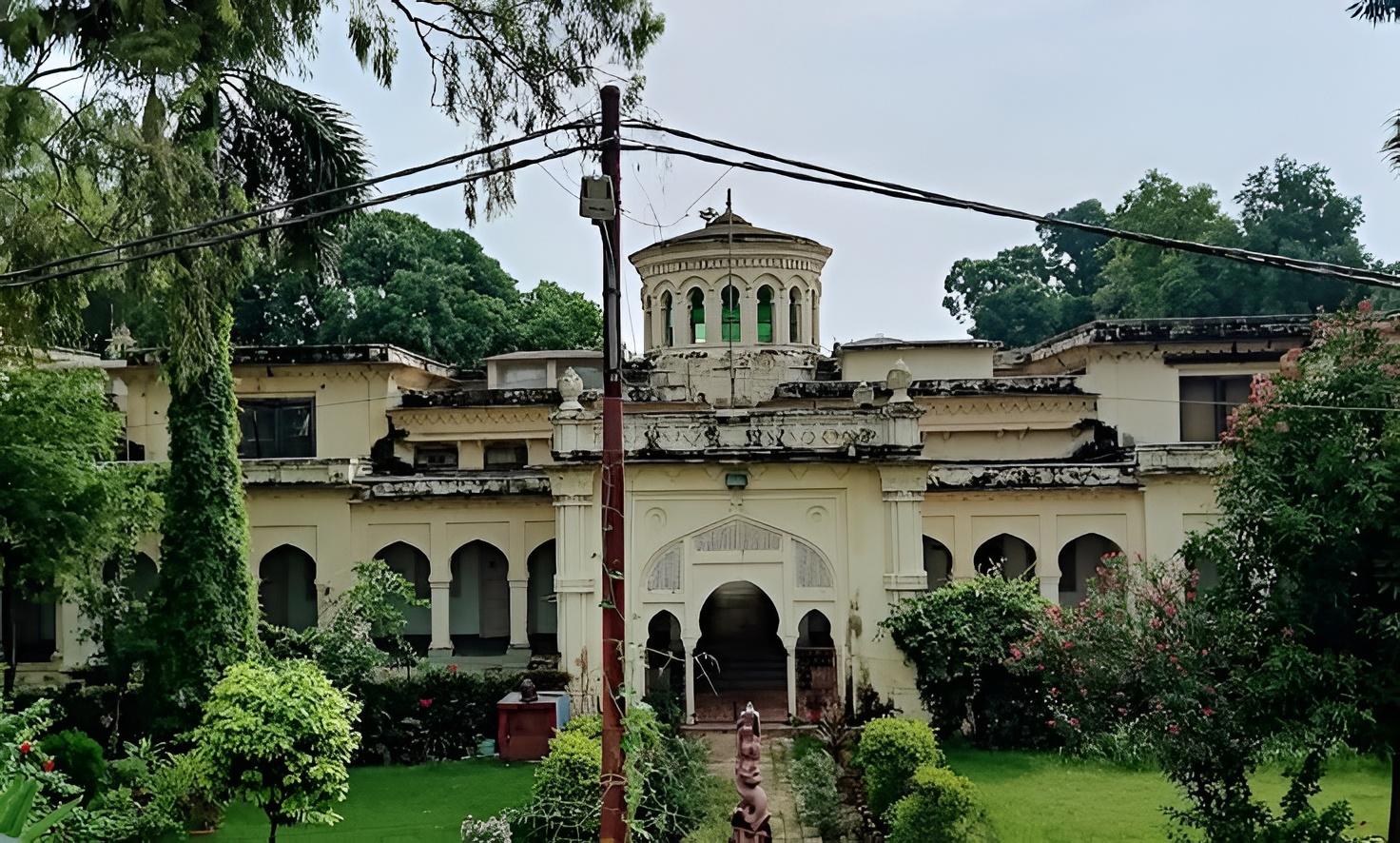
Faculty of Fine Arts, University of Lucknow

== History ==
The school was established as the School of Industrial Design on 1 November 1892. Initially located at Wingfield Manzil, it moved to Aminabad and later to Baans Mandi. A purpose-built structure was started in 1909 and inaugurated in 1911. Nathanial Herd was the first principal. The school was renamed as Government College School of Arts and Crafts in 1917.

Asit Kumar Haldar was the first Indian to be appointed as a principal of the Lucknow College of Arts and Crafts. He occupied his position until he was superannuated at 55 in 1945. Prof. Sukhvir Sanghal, an eminent artist, was also the principal and professor at his alma mater, Lucknow School of Arts, Lucknow. He devotedly served the school throughout his career.

The Indian school of painting was brought to the curriculum in 1925, and graphic arts courses were introduced in 1963. Former principal Jai Kishan Agarwal received the International Print Biannale Florence Italy award in 1974. In 1975 the college merged with the University of Lucknow as a constituent college and its three National diploma courses were converted into degree courses.

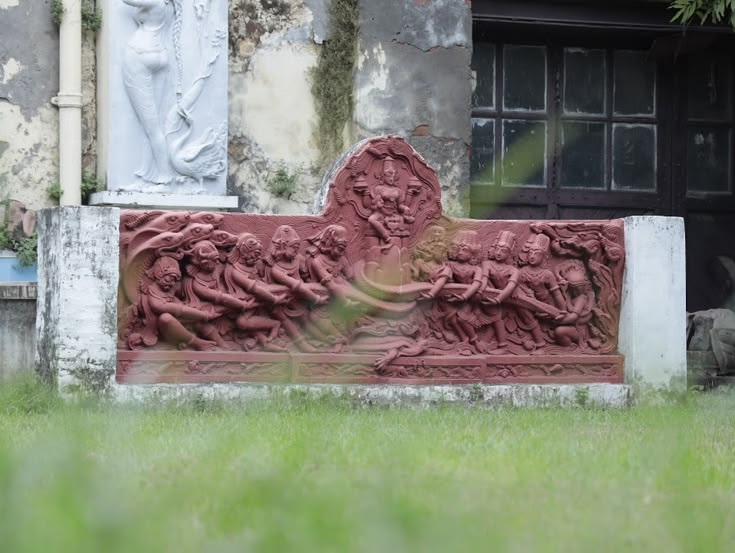
Mural and sculptural relief of Samudra Manthan (Churning of the Ocean) at the Faculty of Fine Arts.

== Departments ==
The college has following departments:

- Department of Fine Arts
- Department of Commercial Arts
- Department of Sculpture

== Courses offered ==
The college offers courses both at under-graduate and post-graduate levels. It offers courses in most media of visual art, both creative and applied art. This includes Master of Fine Art (MFA, a post graduation course of two year in duration) in applied art, sculpture, painting and Bachelor of Fine Art (BFA, an undergraduate course with 4 years duration) in applied art, painting, sculpture, visual communication, and textile design.

== Museum of College of Arts And Crafts ==
The College is home to an arts and crafts museum, founded in 1911.

== Notable alumni ==
- Bhimsain
- Sukumar Bose
- Juhi Chaturvedi
- Prodosh Dasgupta
- Iftekhar
- Ragini Upadhyaya
- Gogi Saroj Pal
- Afsar Madad Naqvi
- Hajra Mansoor
- Uttam Nepali
- Surendra Pal Joshi, an artist known for paintings, sculptures, and murals
- Tulika Sahu, the first Indian woman to be awarded a PhD in photography
- Shyam Sharma
- Rabia Zuberi
- Frank Wesley

== See also ==
- University of Lucknow
- Bhartendu Academy of Dramatic Arts
- Bhatkhande Sanskriti Vishwavidyalaya
