= Madad =

Madad may refer to:

- Afsar Madad Naqvi, (1933 – 1997), Pakistani sculptor
- Madad Ali, father of Noor Jehan
- Syra Madad, American pathogen preparedness expert
- Operation Madad (Indian Navy), a disaster relief operation undertaken by the Indian Armed Forces in the aftermath of the 2004 Indian Ocean tsunami
- Operation Madad (Pakistan Navy), Pakistan Navy's assistance and SAR operation to support effected areas of Pakistan following the 2010 Pakistan floods
- Medad, Iran
