= Medad =

Medad may refer to:

- Eldad and Medad (Biblical figures)
- French: Médad - The French Minister of the Environment, in French Ministère de l'écologie, du développement et de l'aménagement durables
- Medad, Iran, a village in Khuzestan Province, Iran
- Theodore Medad Pomeroy (1824–1905), United States politician
- Yisrael Medad (born 1947), American-born Israeli journalist
