= Islamic painting =

Islamic painting is painting in Islamic art.

The depiction of humans, animals or any other figurative subjects is forbidden within Islam to prevent believers from idolatry so there is no religiously motivated painting (or sculpture) tradition within Muslim culture. Pictorial activity was reduced to Arabesque, mainly abstract, with geometrical configuration or floral and plant-like patterns. Strongly connected to architecture and calligraphy, it can be widely seen as used for the painting of tiles in mosques or in illuminations around the text of the Koran and other books. In fact, abstract art is not an invention of modern art but it is present in pre-classical, barbarian and non-western cultures many centuries before it and is essentially a decorative or applied art. Notable illustrator M. C. Escher was influenced by this geometrical and pattern-based art. Art Nouveau (Aubrey Beardsley and the architect Antonio Gaudí) re-introduced abstract floral patterns into western art.

Note that despite the taboo of figurative visualization, some Muslim countries did cultivate a rich tradition in painting, though not in its own right, but as a companion to the written word. Iranian or Persian art, widely known as Persian miniature, concentrates on the illustration of epic or romantic works of literature. Persian illustrators deliberately avoided the use of shading and perspective, though familiar with it in their pre-Islamic history, in order to abide by the rule of not creating any lifelike illusion of the real world. Their aim was not to depict the world as it is, but to create images of an ideal world of timeless beauty and perfect order.

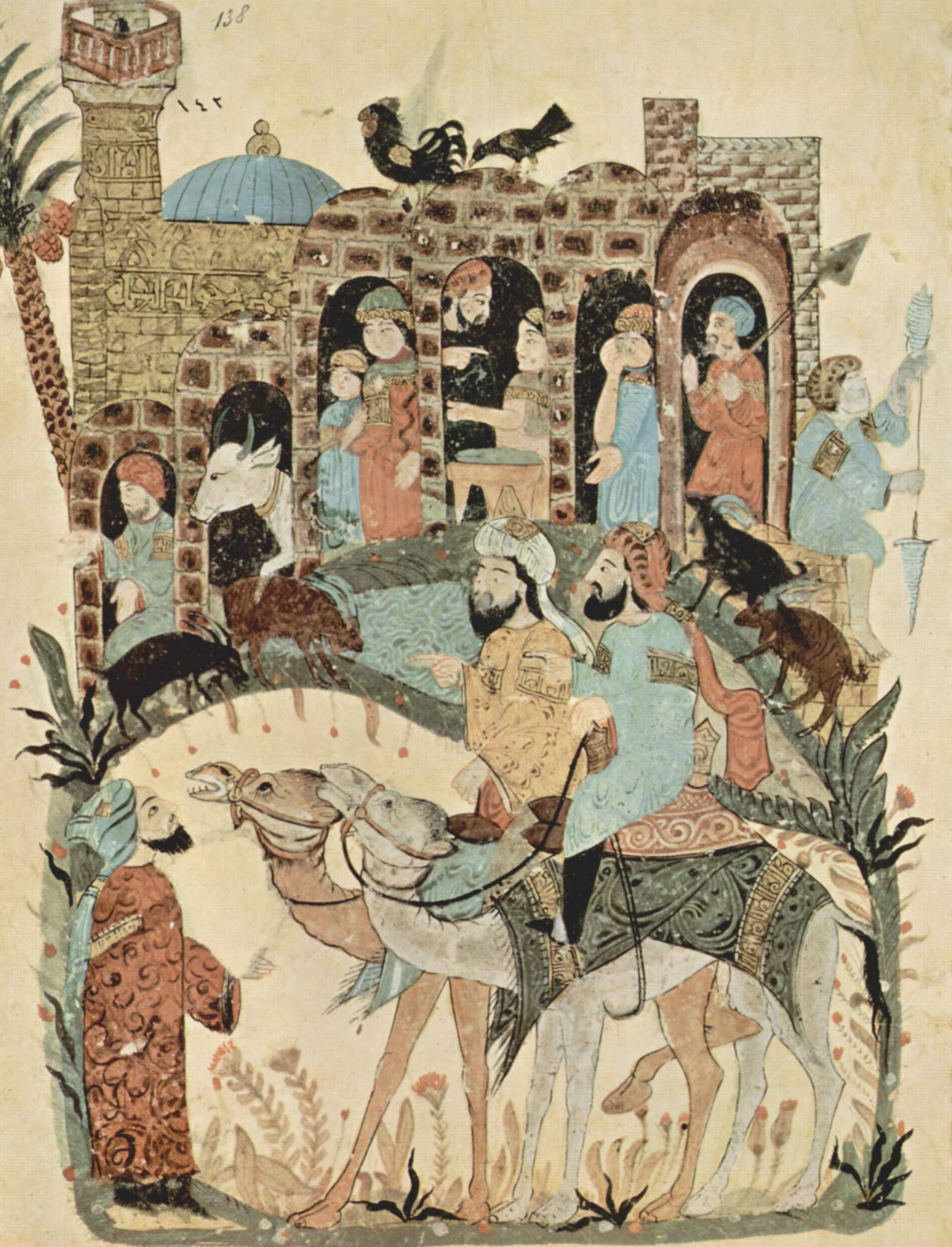
Yahyâ ibn Mahmûd al-Wâsitî, Iraq, 1237

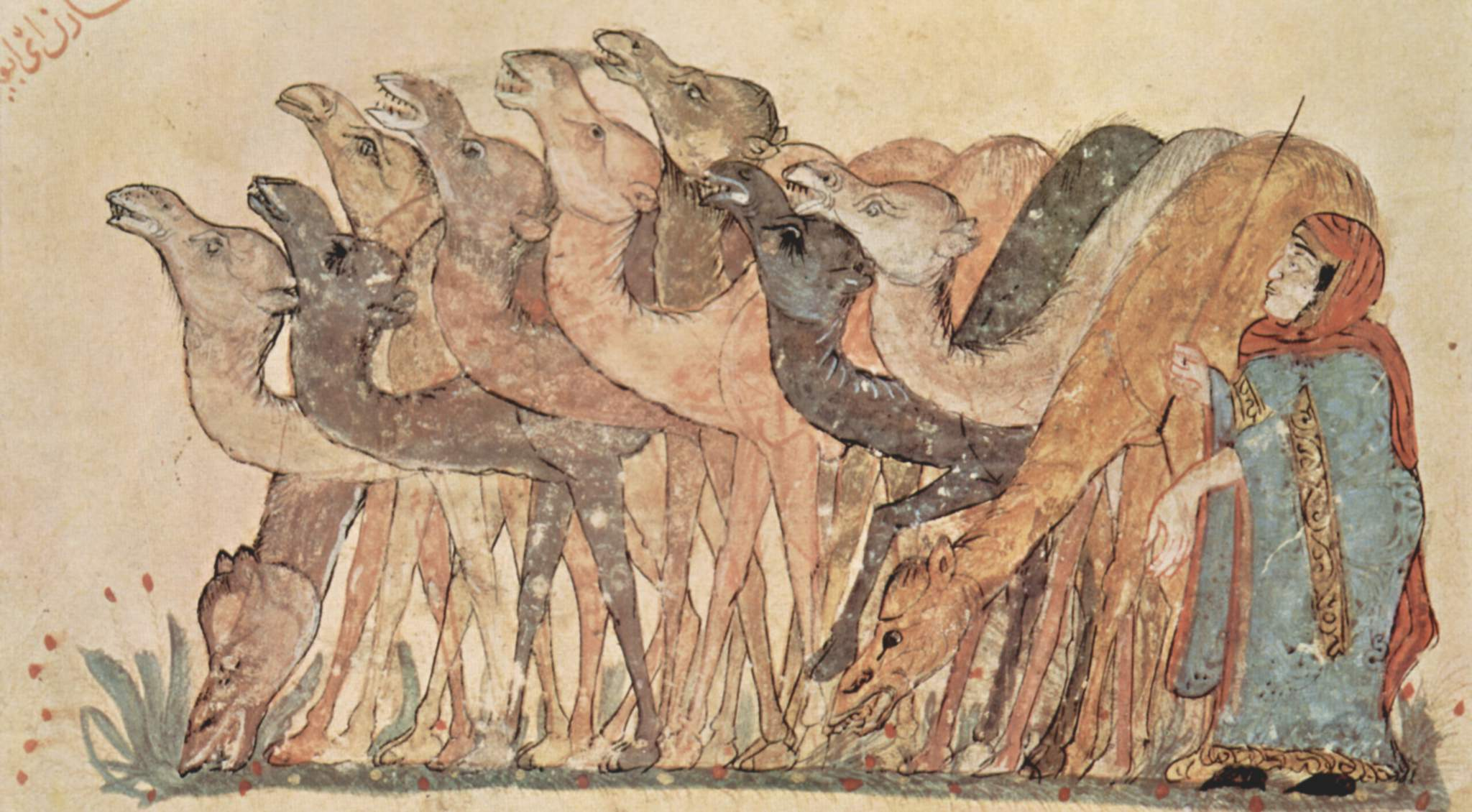
Yahyâ ibn Mahmûd al-Wâsitî, Iraq, 1237

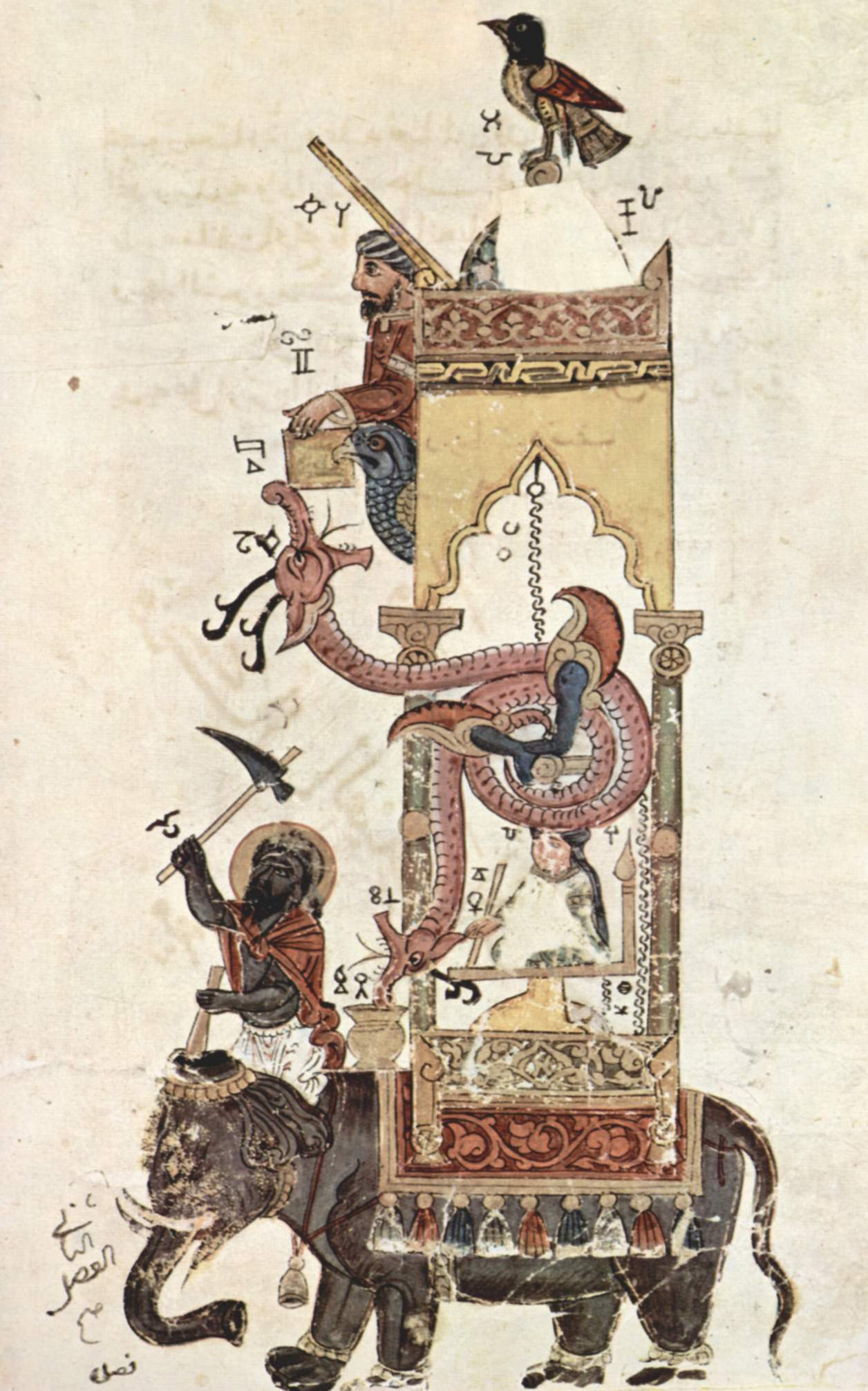
Syrian painter, 1315 Metropolitan Museum of Art

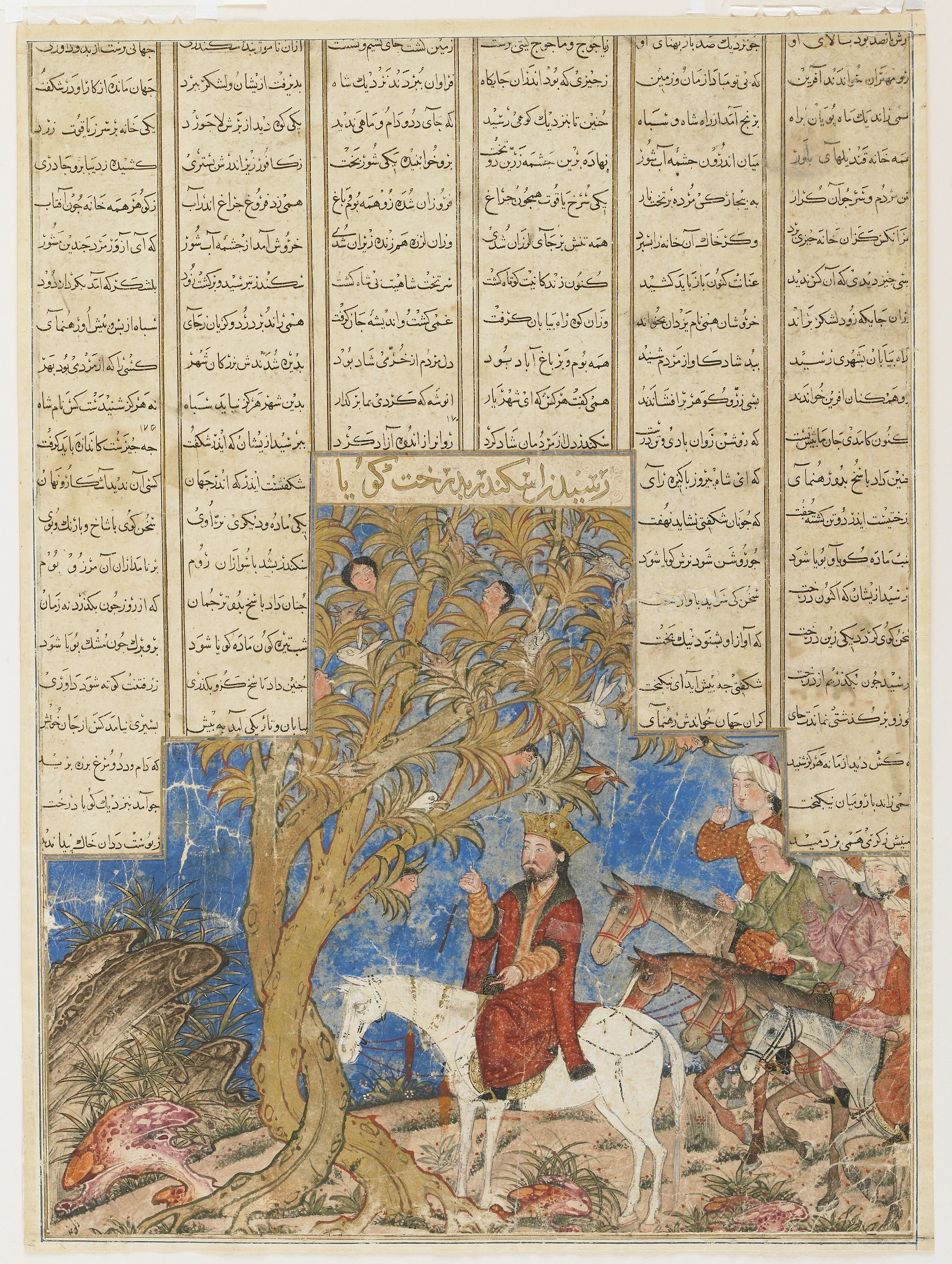
Ilkhanid Shahnameh, ca. 1330–1340, Smithsonian

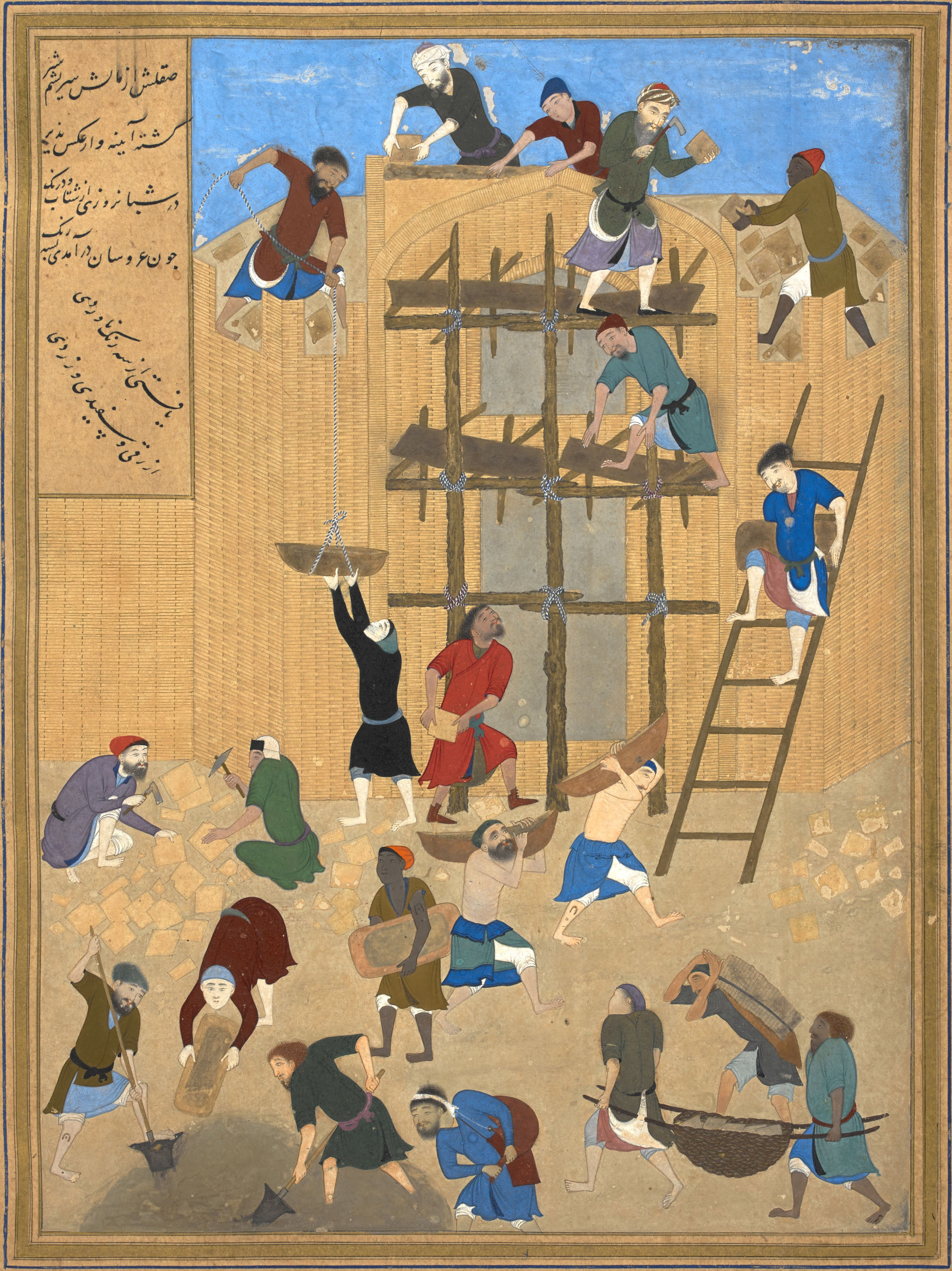
Kamal-ud-din Bihzad (c. 1450 – c. 1535), The construction of castle Khavarnaq (الخورنق) in al-Hira, c. 1494–1495 C.E. British Museum

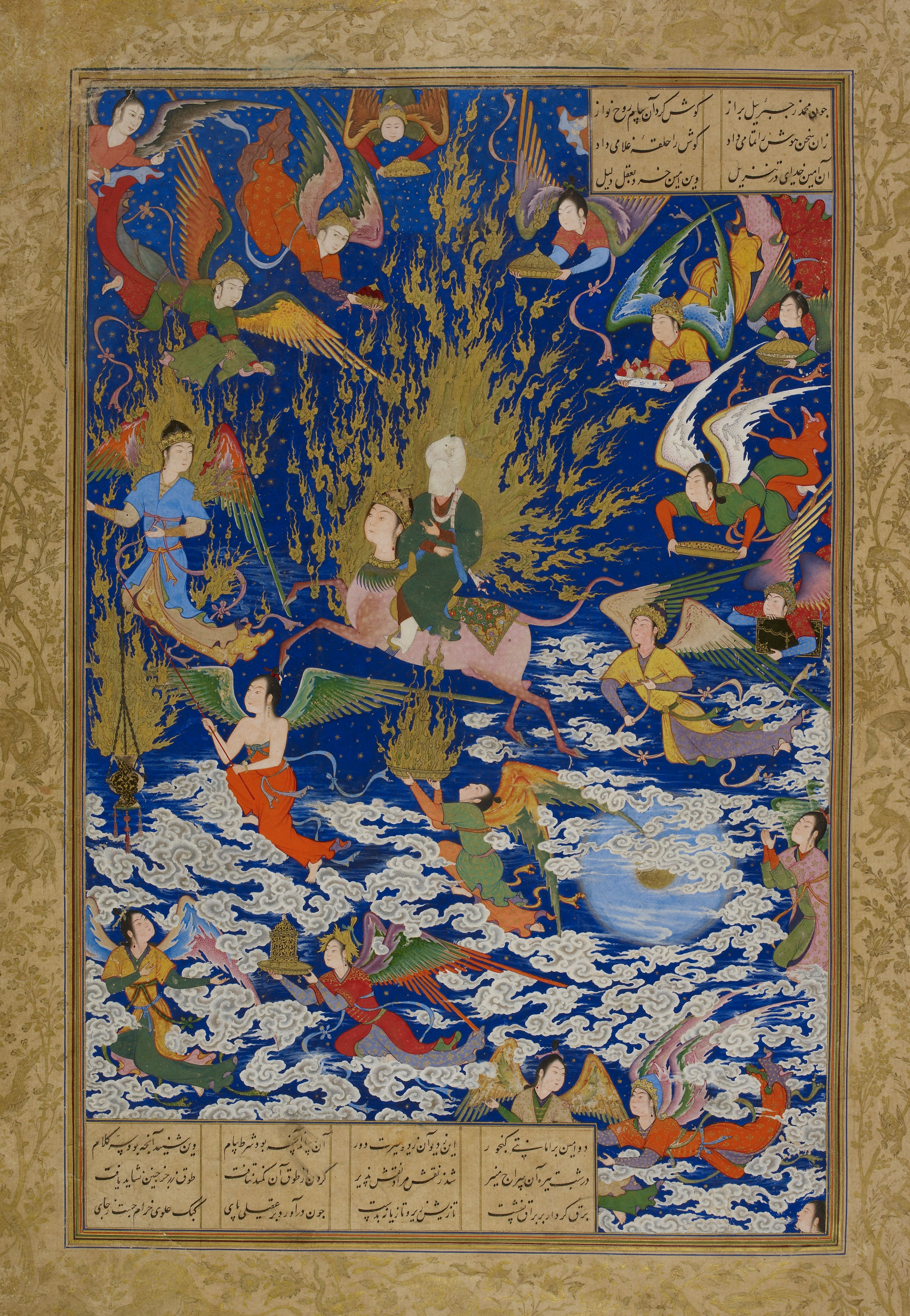
Persian miniature painting, CE 1550

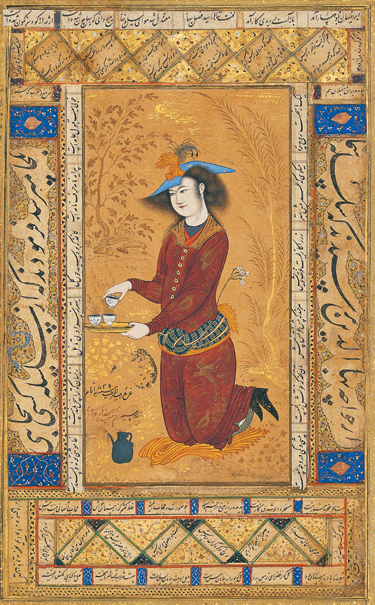
Reza Abbasi, 1609

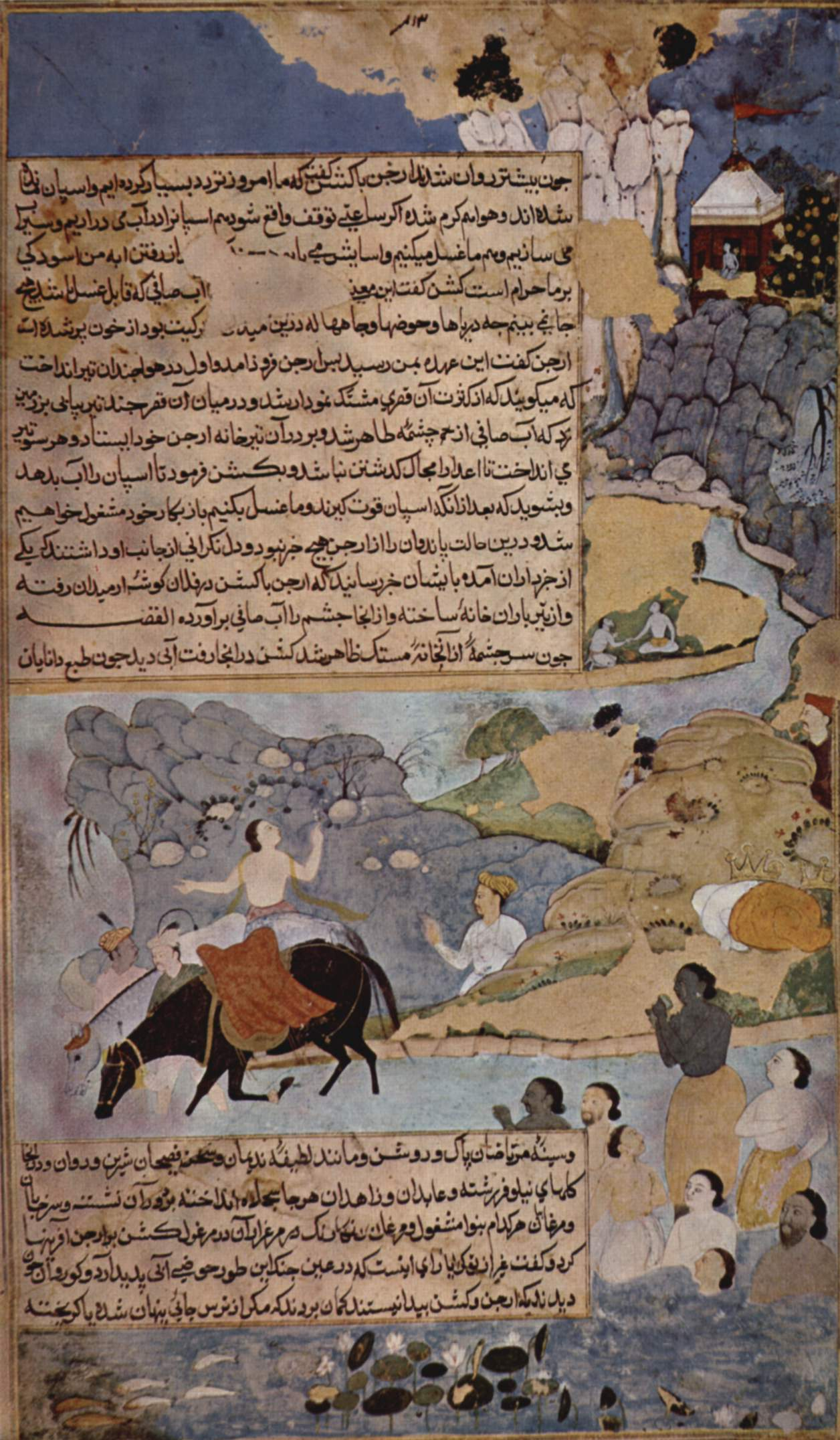
Razmnama, 1616, British Museum

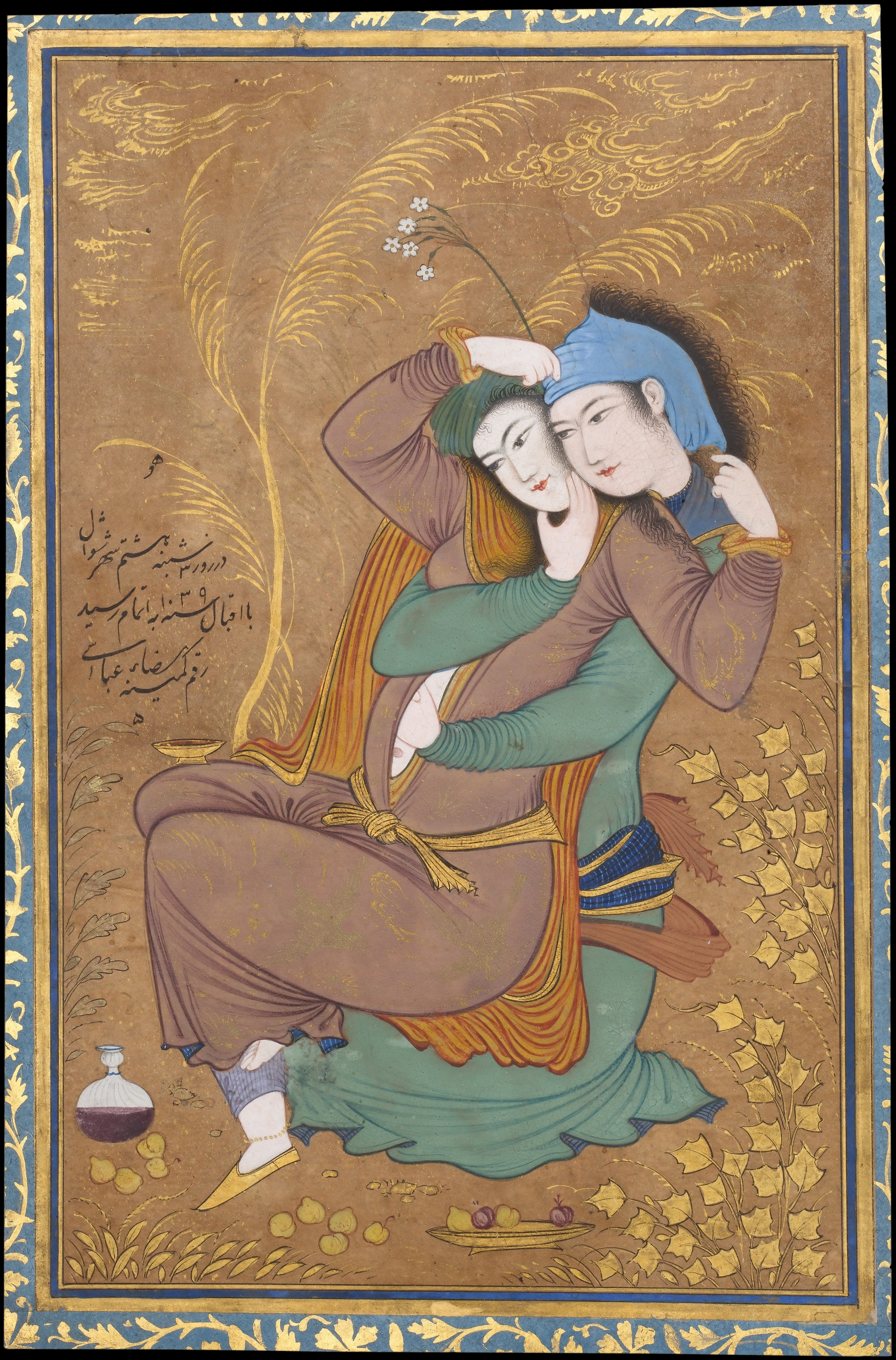
Two Lovers by Reza Abbasi, 1630

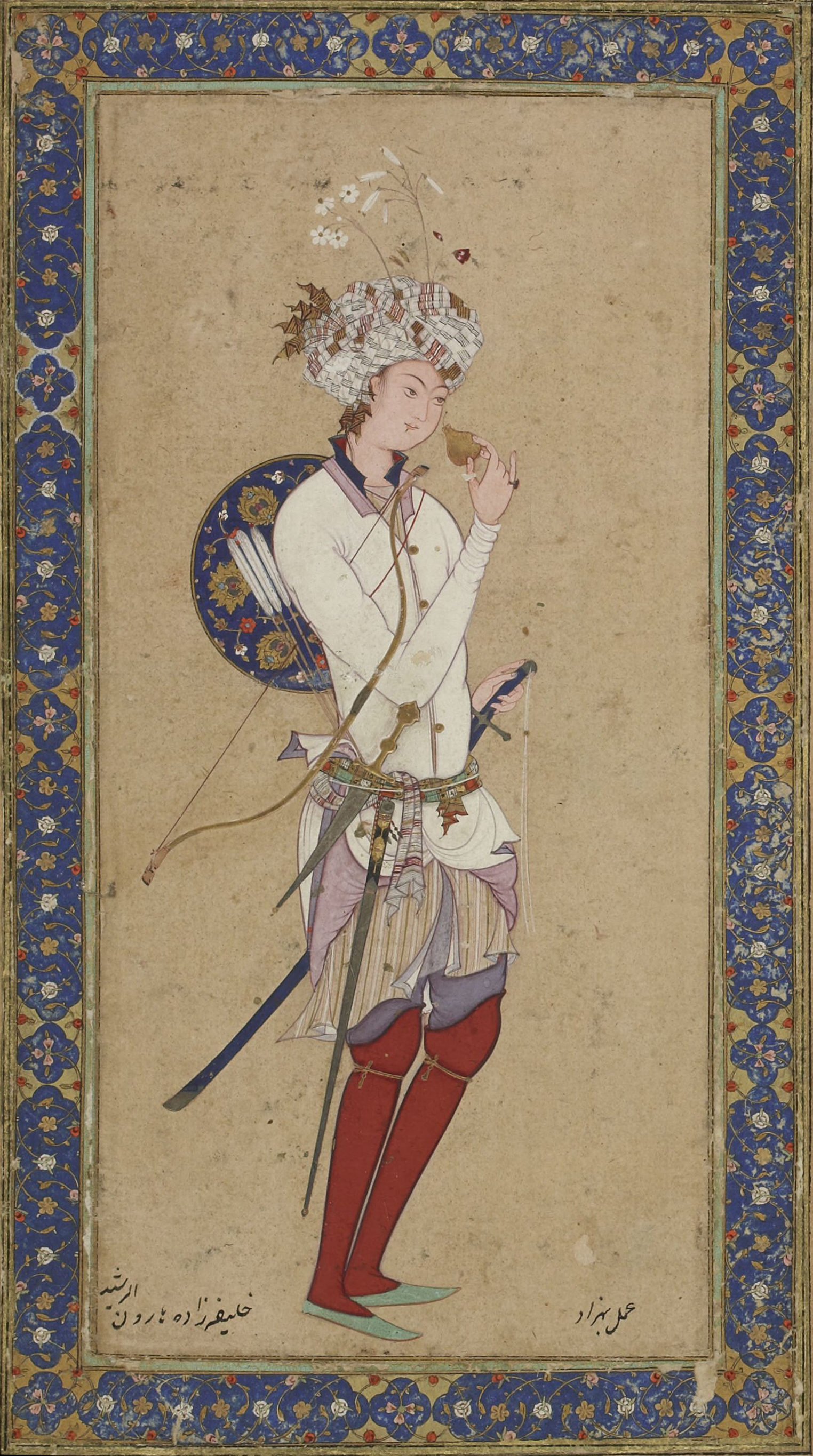
Persian miniature Harun al-Rashid in Thousand and One Nights

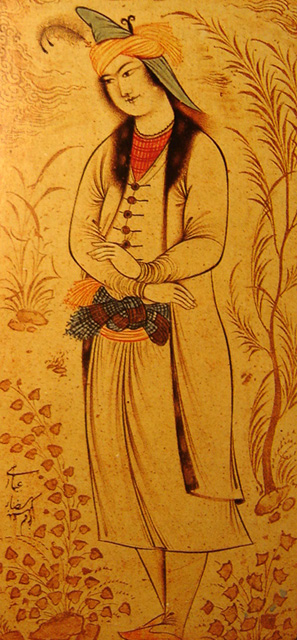
Reza Abbasi (1565–1635), Prince Muhammad-Beik of Georgia, 1620

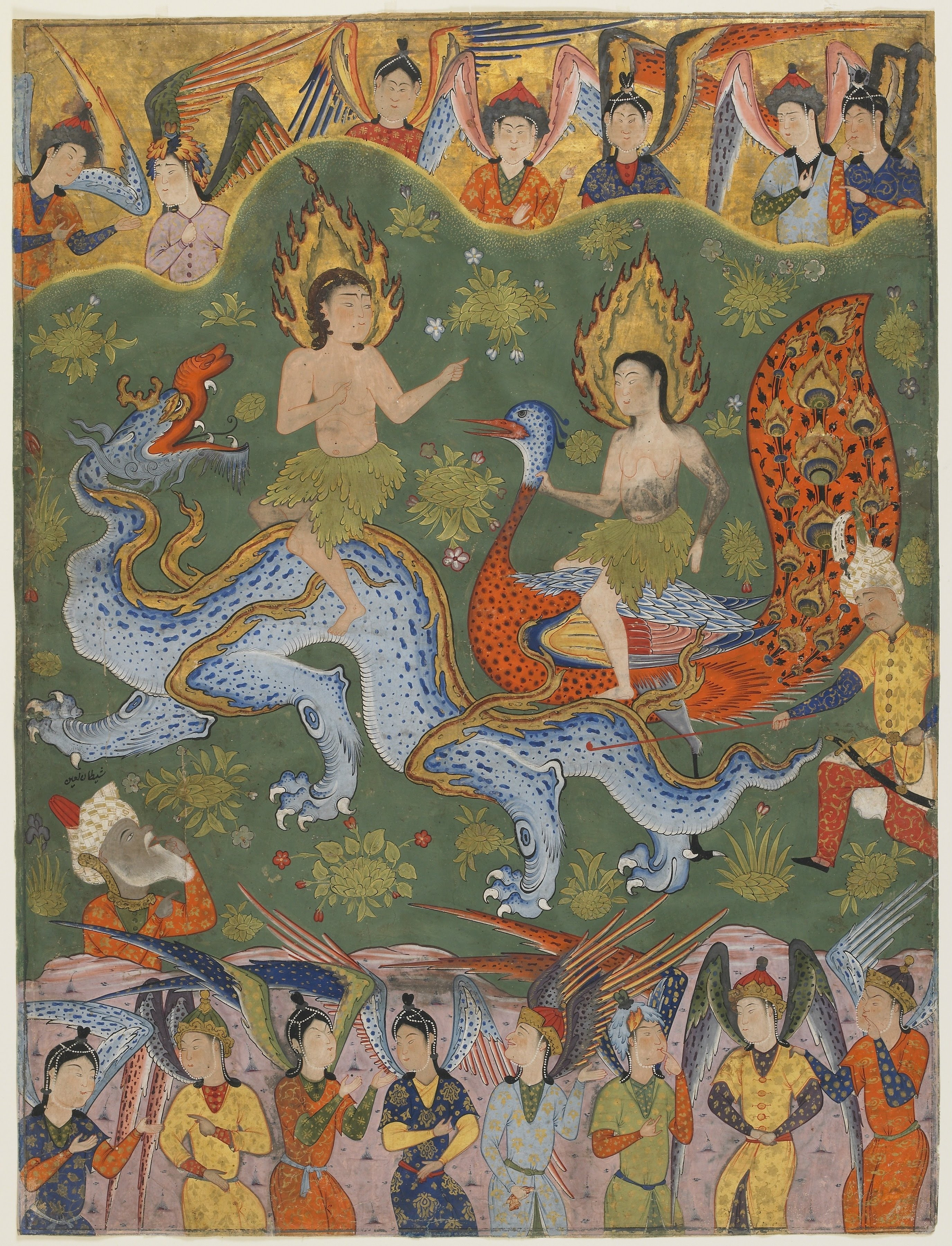
Adam and Eve, Safavid Iran, from a Falnama (book of Omens) c. 1550 AD.

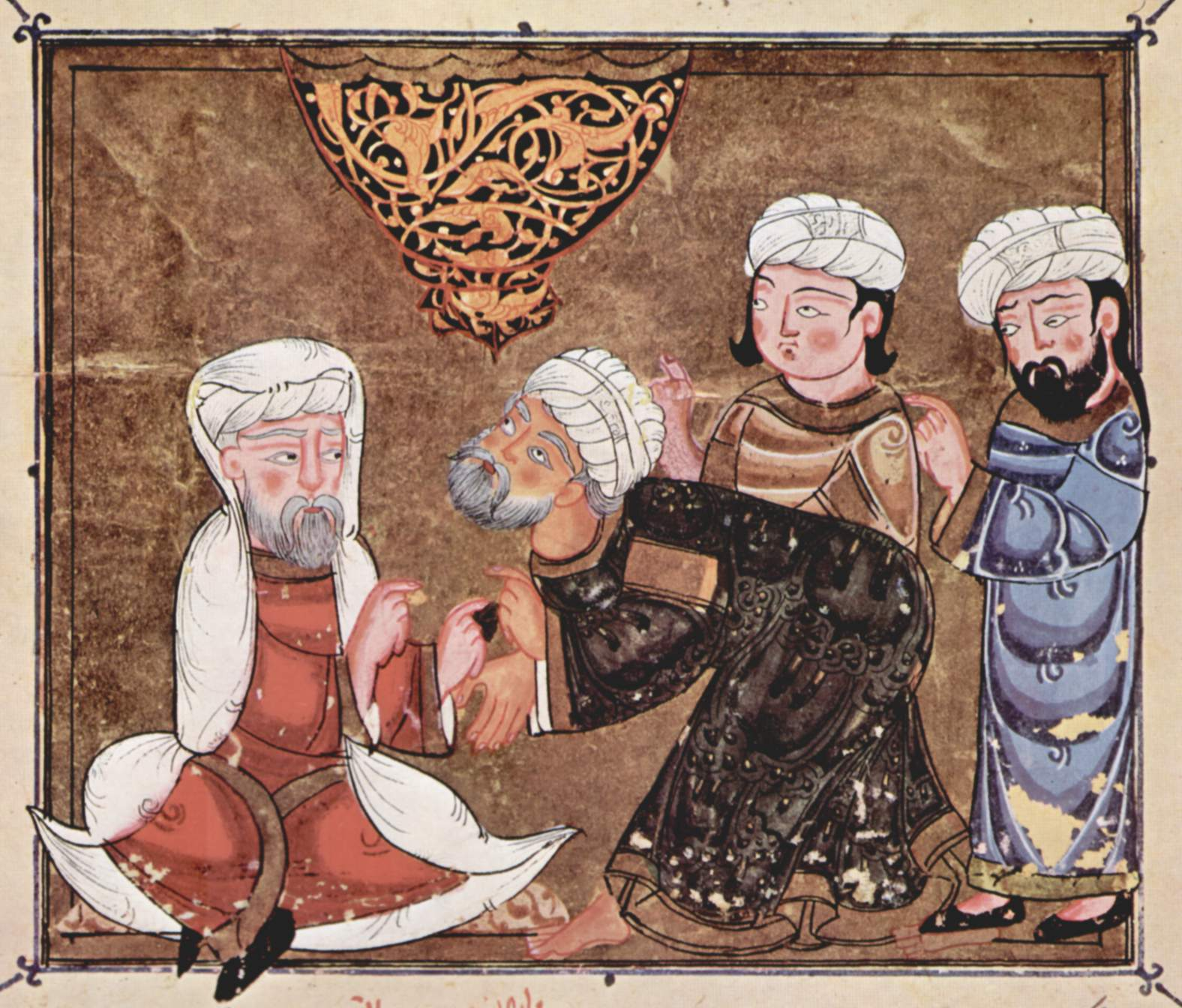
A painting depicting Abû Zayd, 1335 AD.

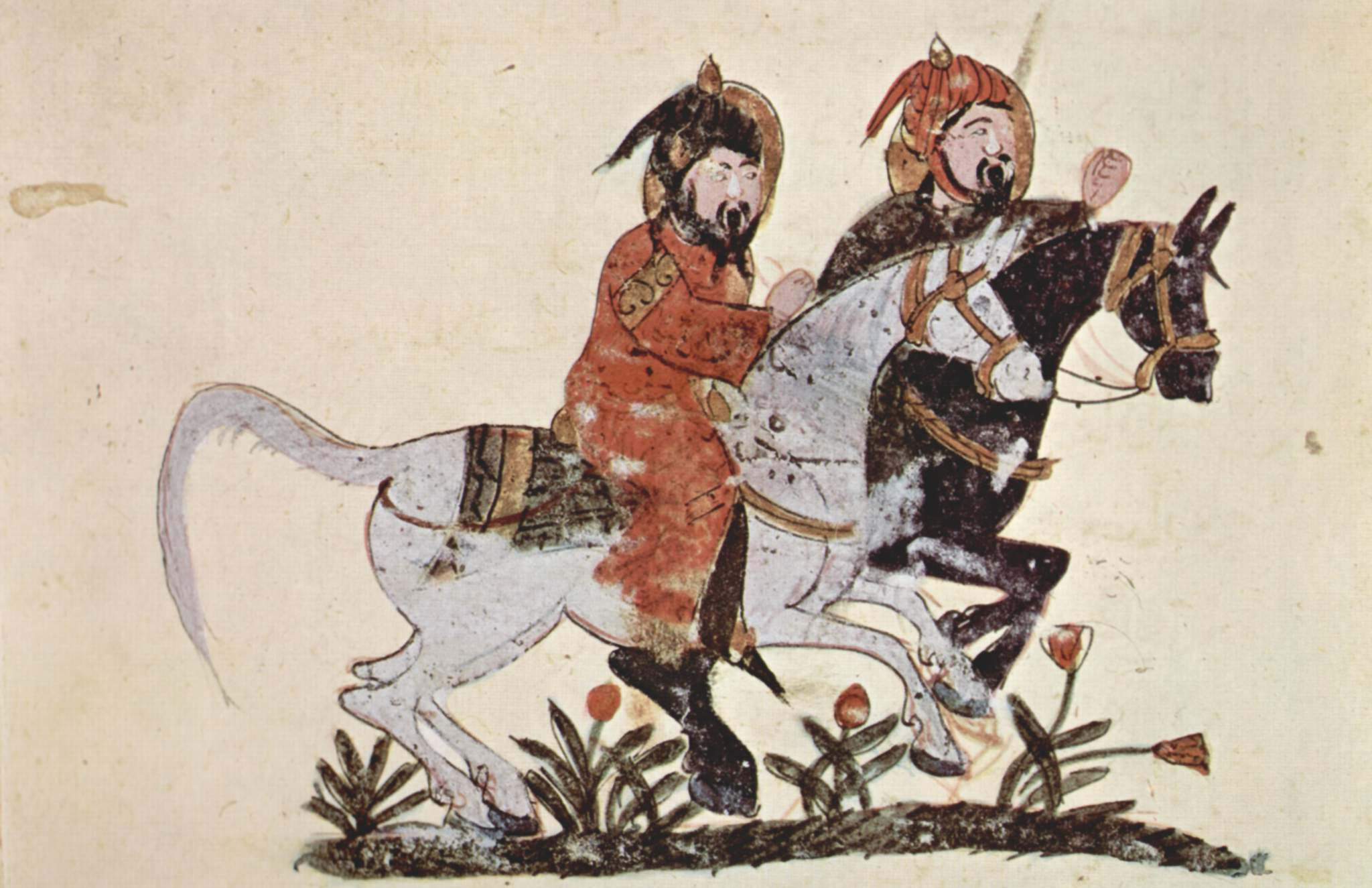
A scene from the book of Ahmad ibn al-Husayn ibn al-Ahnaf, showing two galloping horsemen, 1210 AD.

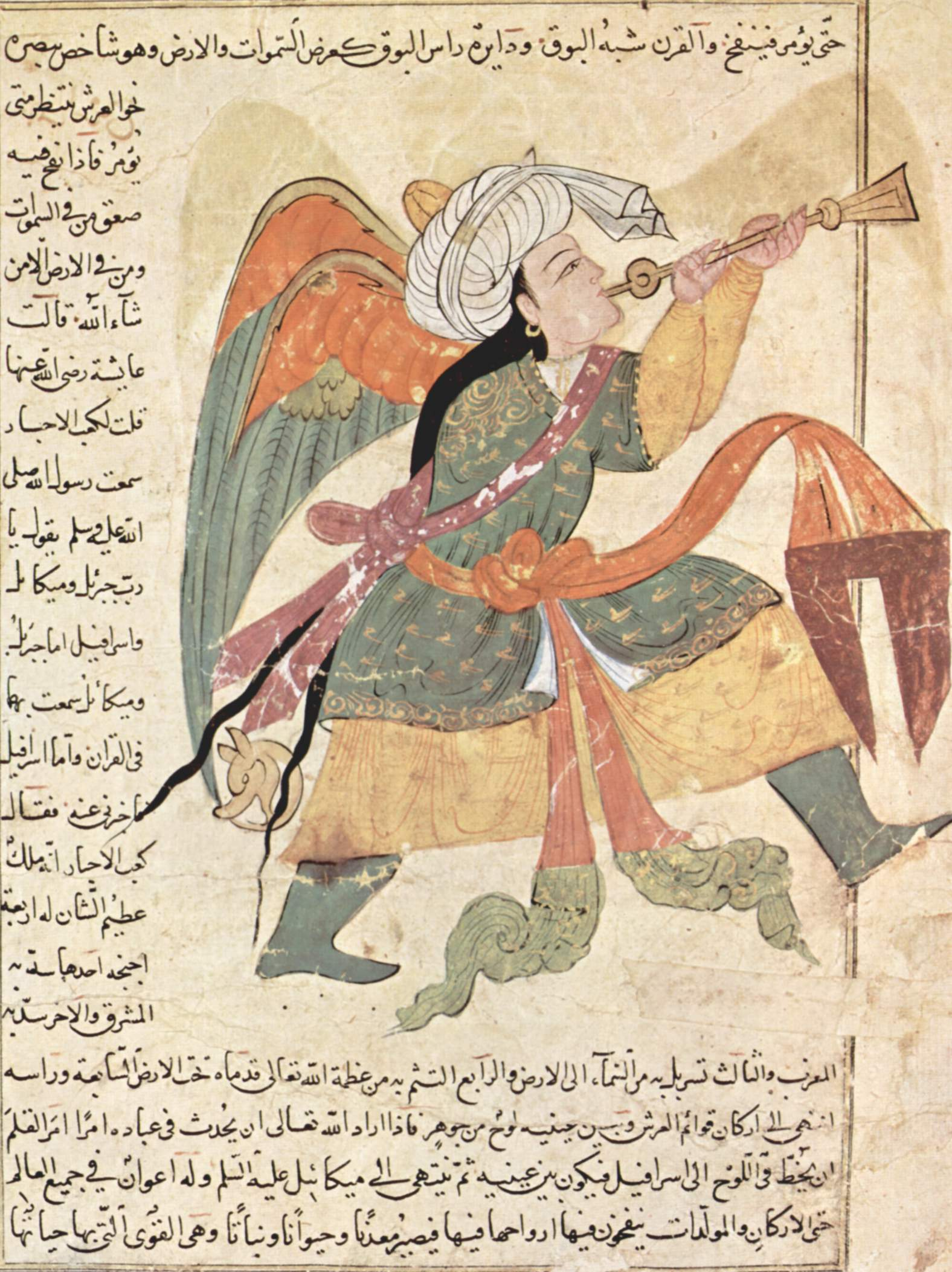
The angel Isrâfîl, Iraq, 1280 AD.

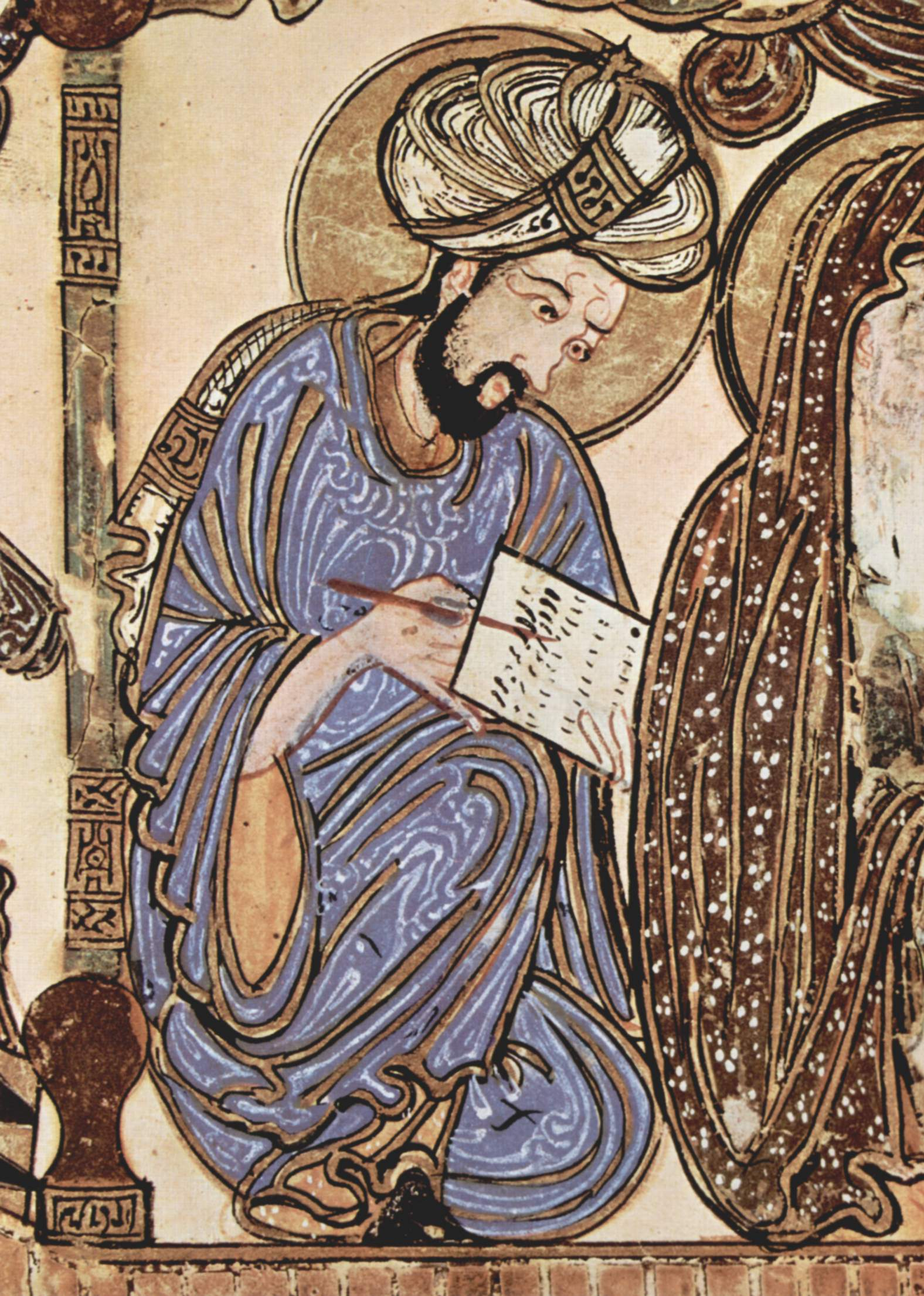
The Clerk, Iraq, 1287.

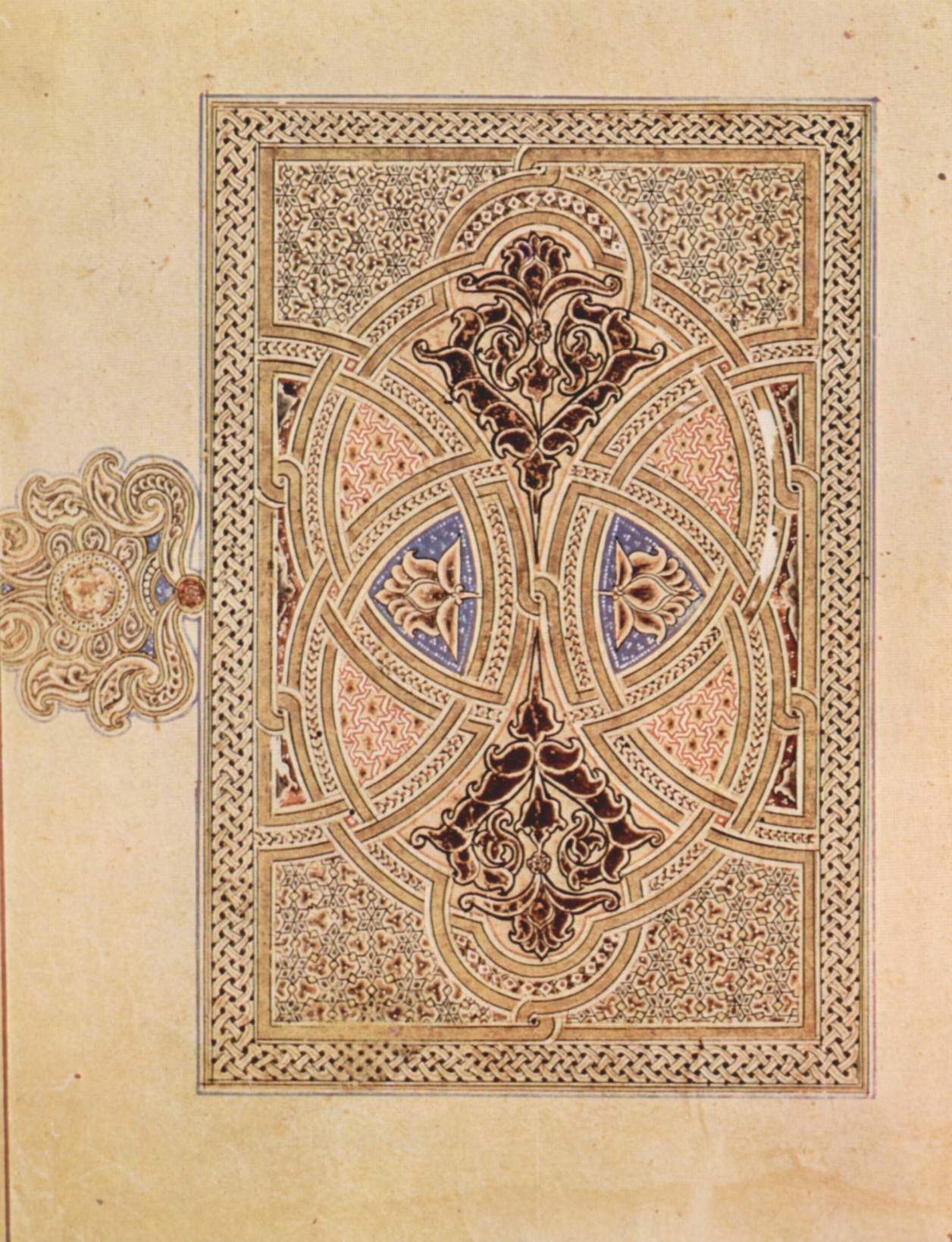
An ornamental Qur'an, by al-Bawwâb, 11th century AD.

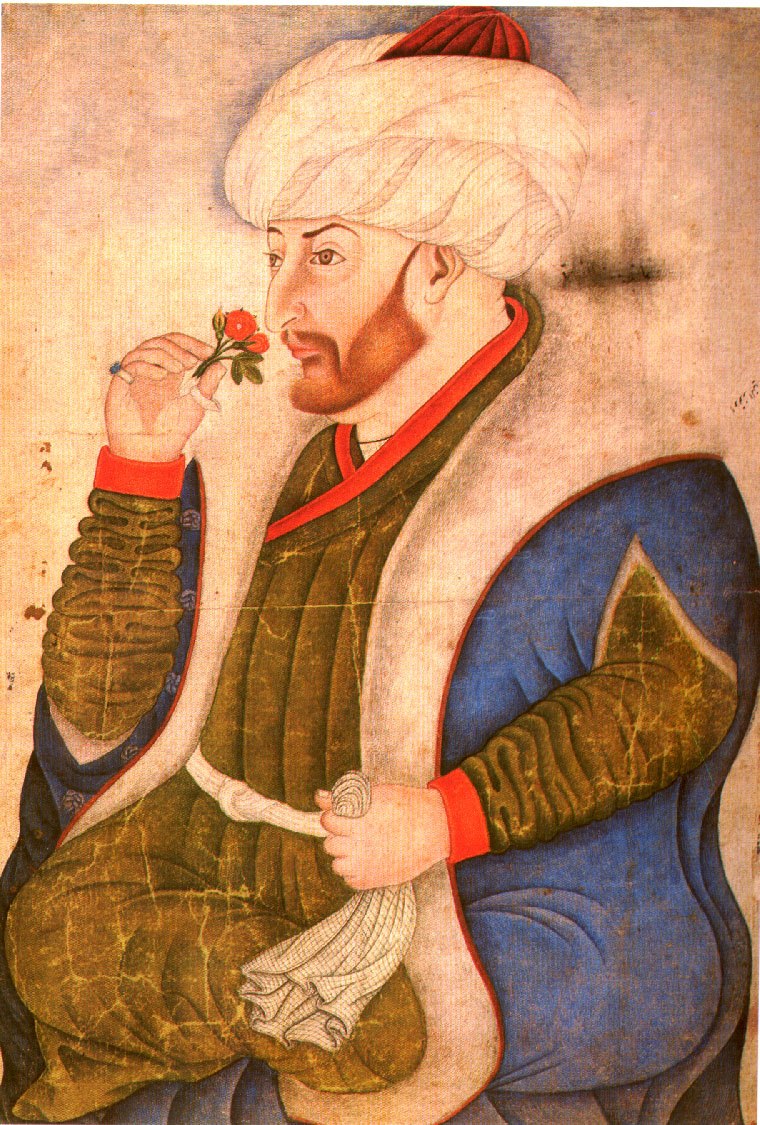
Mehmet II, from the Sarai Albums of Istanbul, Turkey, 15th century AD

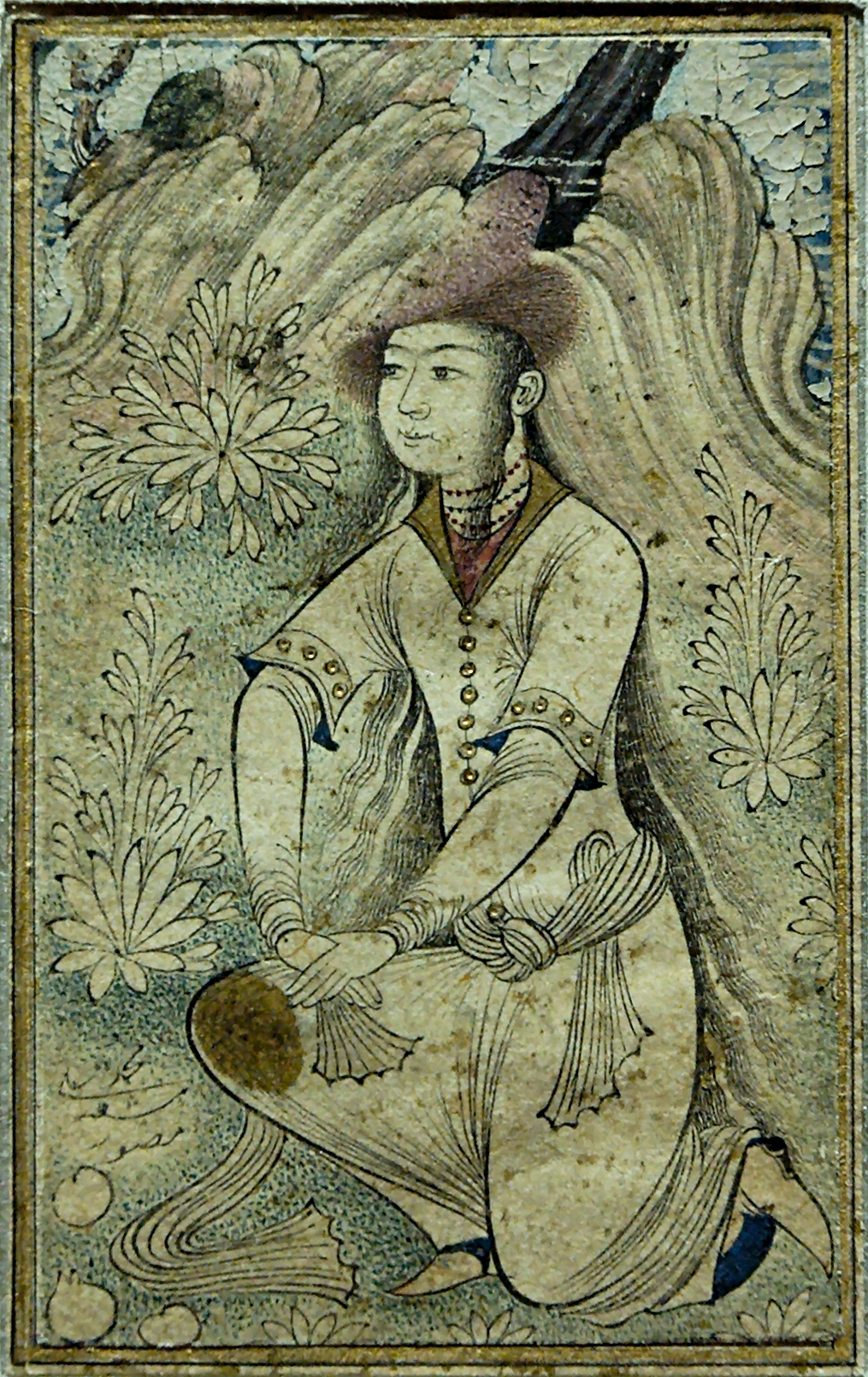
Maiden in a fur cap, by Muhammad 'Alî, Isfahan, Iran, mid-17th century

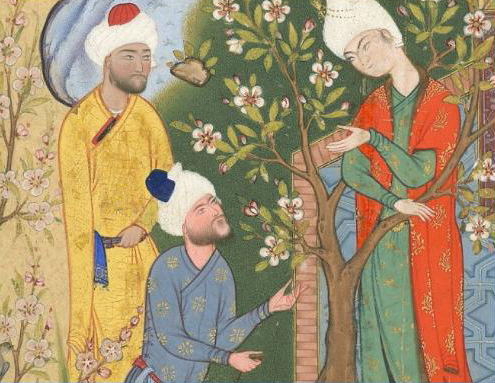
Youth and Suitors, Mashhad, Iran, 1556–1565 AD

== Iran ==
Oriental historian Basil Gray believes "Iran has offered a particularly unique [sic] art to the world which is excellent in its kind". Caves in Iran's Lorestan province exhibit painted imagery of animals and hunting scenes. Some such as those in Fars Province and Sialk are at least 5,000 years old. Painting in Iran is thought to have reached a climax during the Tamerlane era, when outstanding masters such as Kamaleddin Behzad gave birth to a new style of painting.

Paintings of the Qajar period are a combination of European influences and Safavid miniature schools of painting such as those introduced by Reza Abbasi and classical works by Mihr 'Ali. Masters such as Kamal-ol-molk further pushed forward the European influence in Iran. It was during the Qajar era when "Coffee House painting" emerged. Subjects of this style were often religious in nature depicting scenes from Shia epics and the like.

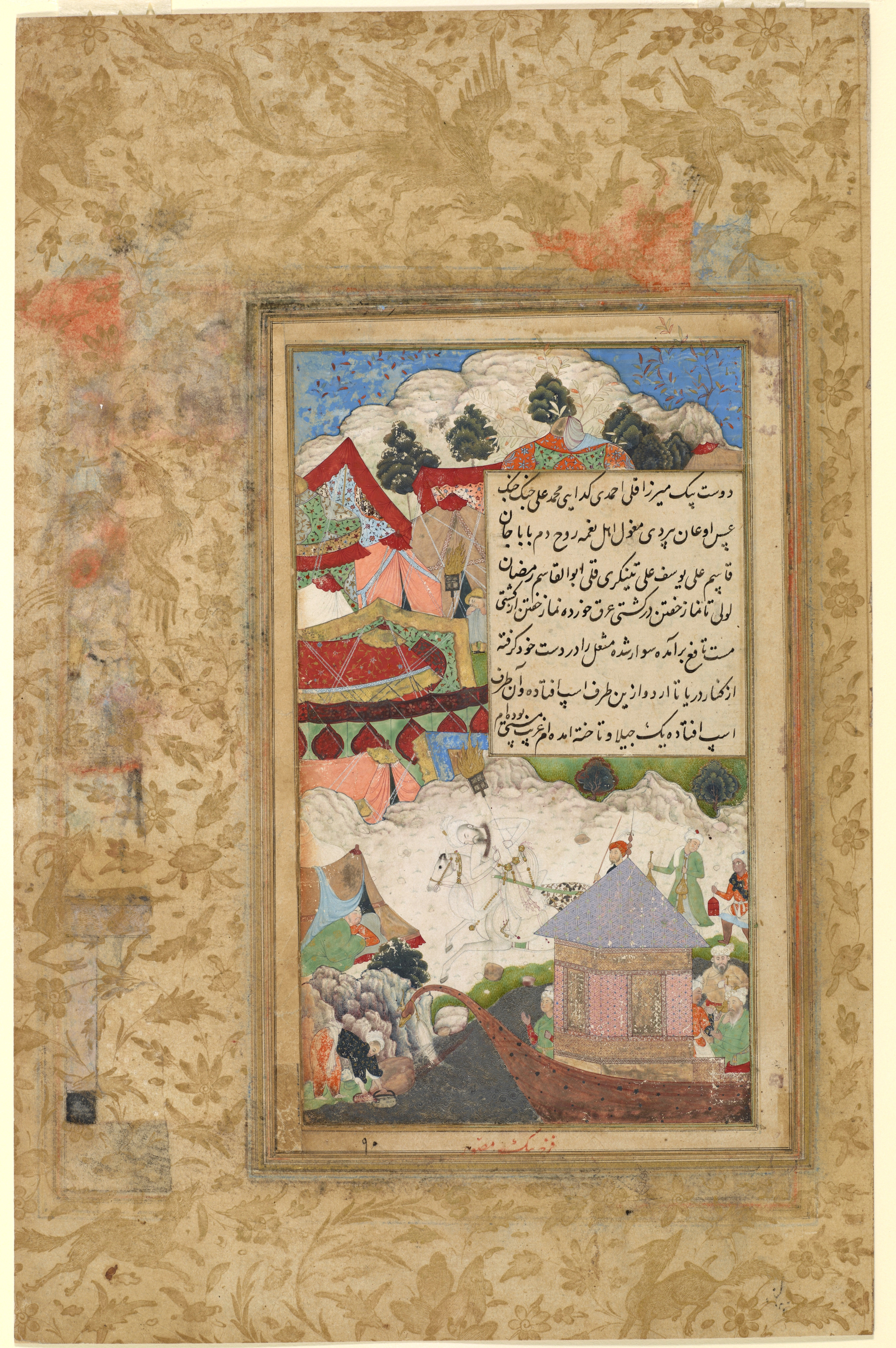
Farrukh Beg (ca. 1545 – ca. 1615), A Drunken Babur Returns to Camp at Night, Lahore, Pakistan, 1589

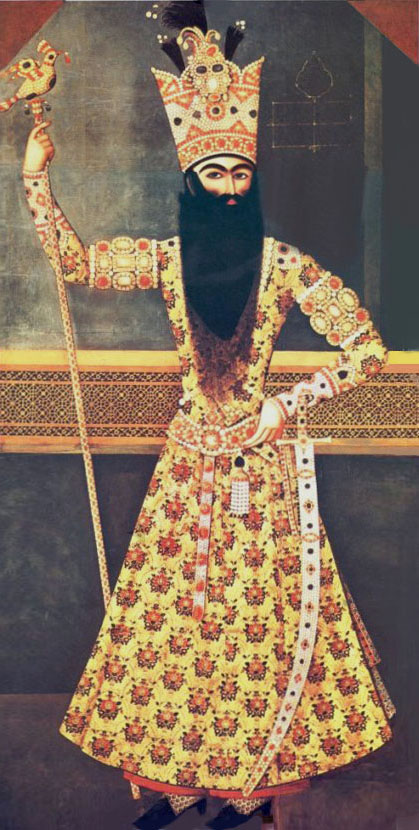
Mihr 'Ali (fl. 1795–1830), Fat'h Ali Shah Qajar (1813–14)

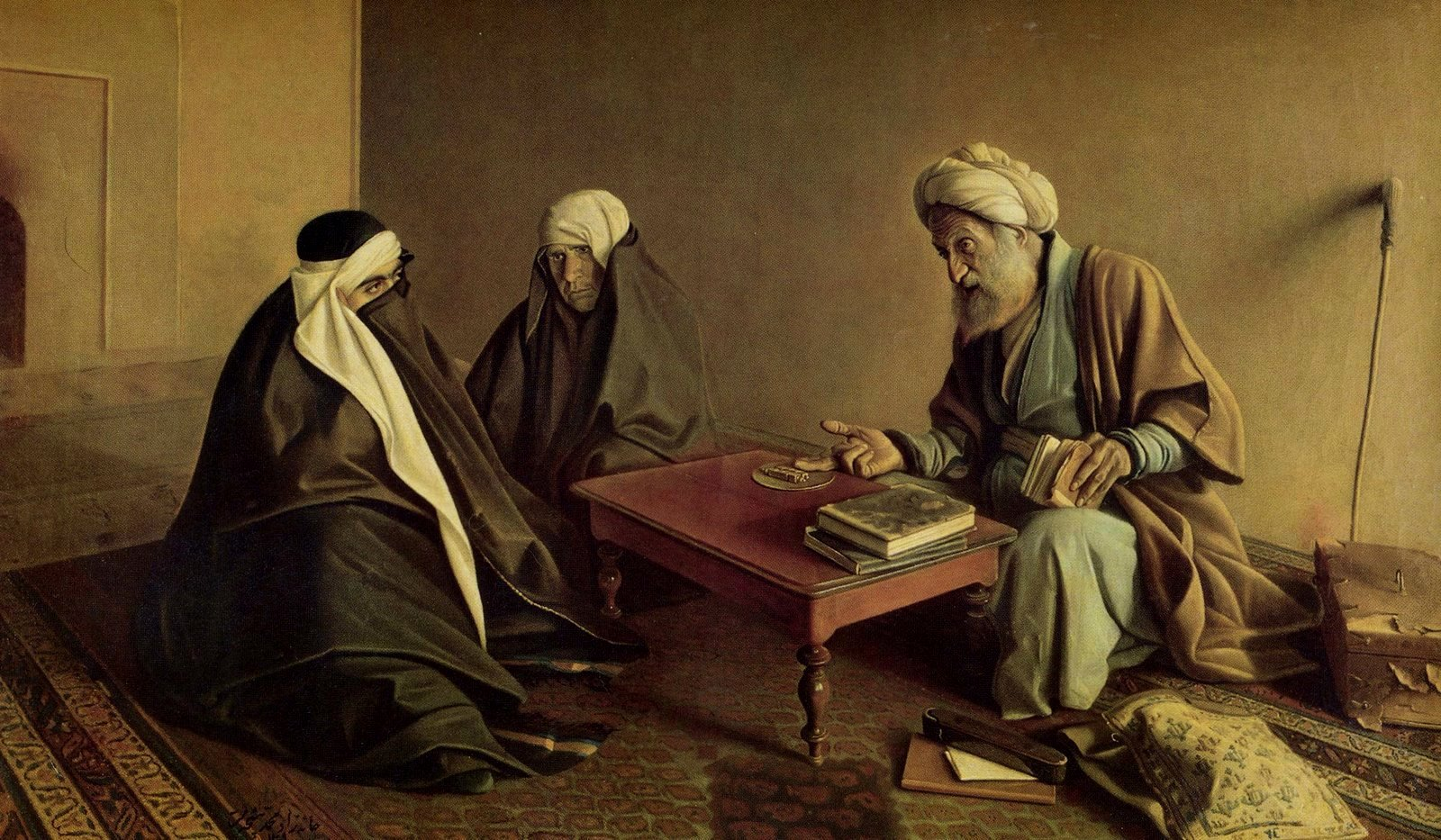
Kamal-ol-molk (1847–1940), Predictor of the Future, 1892, Museum of Sadabad, Tehran

== Pakistan ==
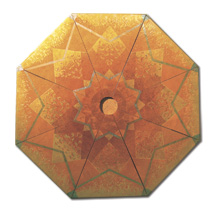
Lubna Agha, Star – a painting inspired by the artisans of Morocco

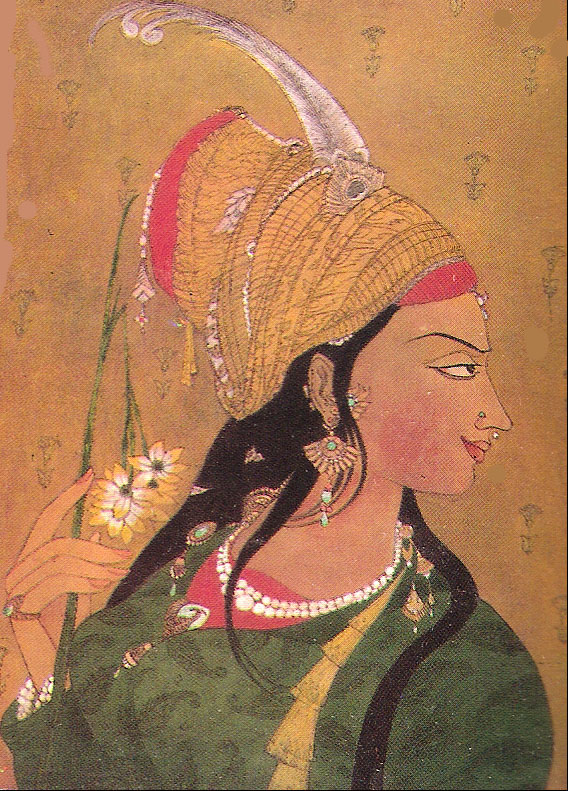
AR Chughtai, Anarkali
