= Shyam Sharma =

Shyam Sharma may refer to:

- Shyam Sharma (printmaker)
- Shyam Sharma (politician)
