= Lubna Agha =

Pakistani-American painter (1949–2012)

- Born: Lubna Latif; May 2, 1949; Quetta, Pakistan
- Died: May 6, 2012 (aged 63); Brookline, Massachusetts, U.S.
- Education: Karachi School of Art (1967)
- Known for: Painting, graphic design
- Movement: Abstract art, contemporary Islamic art
- Spouse: Yusuf Agha (m. 1974)
- Website: lubnaagha.art

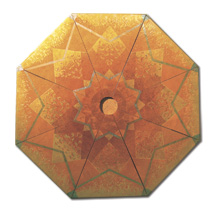
Lubna Agha's Star. a work inspired by Moroccan artisans

Lubna Agha (née Latif; 2 May 1949 – 6 May 2012) was a Pakistani-American painter and graphic designer. A 1967 graduate of the Karachi School of Art, she was among the first women in Pakistan to exhibit non-figurative abstract painting, coming to prominence in the early 1970s with her "White" series. After emigrating to the United States in 1981 she continued to exhibit in California, Massachusetts, and Pakistan, and in the 2000s developed a body of dot-pattern paintings on canvas and wood inspired by Islamic architecture she encountered in Morocco and Turkey.

== Early life and education ==
Agha was born Lubna Latif on 2 May 1949 in Quetta, where her father, a government officer, was posted at the time. Her family, originally from Delhi, and had moved to Pakistan after the partition of INdia. She was raised and schooled in Karachi.

In the mid-1960s, she enrolled at the newly established Mina School of Art (later renamed the Karachi School of Art), founded in 1964 by the sisters Rabia and Hajra Zuberi, graduates of the Lucknow College of Arts, together with the painter Mansoor Rahi. According to Rahi's spouse and painter Hajra Mansoor, Agha was the school's first student. She graduated in 1967 and taught for a year at Ali Imam's Central Institute of Art in Karachi.

== Career ==
=== Artwork in Pakistan (1967–1981) ===
Agha held her first solo exhibition at the Pakistan American Cultural Center in Karachi in 1969. She won the Ghalib Gold Medal for her watercolours and, while at art school, exhibited regularly at the Arts Council of Pakistan and newly-opened commercial galleries in Karachi, Lahore and Rawalpindi. A 1971 solo show at the Arts Council in Karachi, which filled the main hall with around sixty abstract paintings, is widely regarded as the breakthrough of her career. In 1973, she was awarded the second prize at the National Exhibition of the National Council of the Arts, a competition then dominated by senior male artists.

Through the 1970s, she developed her "White" series, minimalist works dominated by white grounds with cotton-ball forms delineated by calligraphic lines and passages of black and red. During the same decade, she worked as art director of the English-language current-affairs magazine Herald under editor Razia Bhatti, designing its original layout. In 1974, she married Yusuf Agha, then an Assistant Collector of Customs and later an art writer, and took his surname. The couple had two children, Aurangzeb and Diya. Her murals from this period were installed at Habib Bank Plaza in Karachi.

=== Artwork in the United States (1981–2012) ===
In 1981, the family moved to Sacramento, California, after Yusuf Agha enrolled for a master's degree at a university there. During the 1980s and early 1990s, she had solo shows at the Alta, Stuart/Scott, Rara Avis, Djurovich and Himovitz/Solomon galleries in the Sacramento area, and returned periodically to Pakistan to exhibit at the Indus Gallery and, later, at Chawkandi Art. Her California work marked a return to figuration, with drawings and watercolours in which disjointed, ungrounded figures expressed the experience of migration and cultural displacement.

In 1995, the family relocated to the Boston area and eventually settled in Brookline, Massachusetts. In Boston, Agha worked as a senior art director at a business communication agency. Around 2000, she produced the Ja-namaaz series of prayer-rug paintings, which incorporated logos of institutions including the White House, the IMF and McDonald's as a critique of Pakistan's dependence on foreign institutions.

After travels to Morocco and Turkey in 2004–2005, Agha turned decisively to Islamic architectural and decorative sources, developing a meticulous dot-based technique on canvas and on shaped wooden supports that echoed the forms of minarets, domes, crenellated windows, pen boxes, and rehals. This late body of work was the subject of a monograph, Lubna Agha: Points of Reference, written by Sirhandi and published in 2007 by the Foundation of the Museum of Modern Art, Pakistan. Works from the series were acquired by the United States Department of State's Art in Embassies programme and were used on the covers of two poetry anthologies supported by the National Endowment for the Arts. Her final solo exhibition, Points of Reference: Paintings Cite Islamic Visual Legacy, was held at the Gardiner Art Gallery of Oklahoma State University in Stillwater in February 2012.

== Legacy ==
Works by Agha are held in the permanent collections of the Cartwright Hall Asian collection at Bradford Museums and Galleries in the United Kingdom, the Pakistan National Council of the Arts and the Jordan National Gallery of Fine Arts in Amman. In 2016, the Karachi School of Art inaugurated the Lubna Agha Art Gallery in her memory, opening it with an exhibition of her paintings and a memorial lecture. In the same year, the VM Art Gallery in Karachi mounted the retrospective A Path All My Own, which brought together works from every phase of her practice.
