= Michael Wesley =

Australian academic of Indian descent (born 1968)

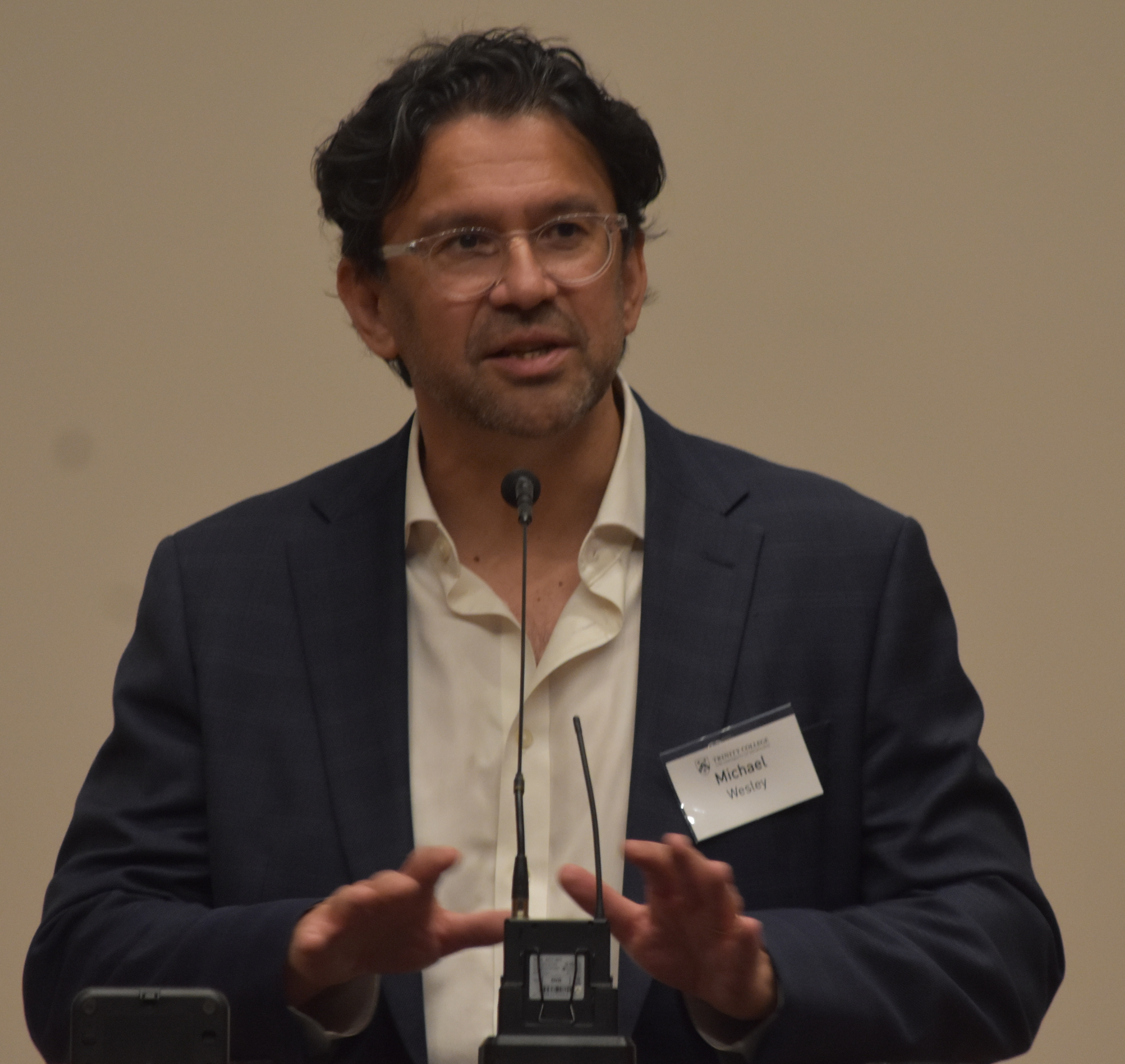
- Wesley in 2025 at Trinity College
- Born: 1968 (age 57–58); Lucknow, India
- Citizenship: Australia
- Education: University of St Andrews (PhD)
- Awards: 2011 John Button Prize for Best Writing in Australian Politics
- Scientific career
- Fields: International relations, Security Studies
- Workplaces: University of Melbourne, The Australian National University, Griffith University, the University of New South Wales, University of Sydney

Michael Wesley (born 1968) is an Australian academic of Indian descent. He is currently the Acting Vice-Chancellor at the University of Melbourne, having previously been appointed Professor of International Relations and Deputy VC International at the University of Melbourne in 2019, and was previously Dean of the College of Asia and the Pacific and professor at The Australian National University. He also consults extensively for the Australian government.

== Early life and education ==
Wesley was born in India but moved to Australia with his parents aged four years old. He grew up in Nambour, south-east Queensland. Wesley went to Nambour State High School, and then to the University of Queensland. He completed a PhD at the University of St Andrews in Scotland. Michael Wesley is the son of the internationally renowned artist Frank Wesley.

== Career ==
Michael Wesley has worked for the Queensland State government and as a lecturer and senior lecturer at the University of New South Wales. He spent time on secondment from UNSW to the Office of National Assessments. In 2004, he became Professor of International Relations and Director of the Griffith Asia Institute at Griffith University. He served as co-chairman of the Security and Prosperity working group at then Prime Minister Kevin Rudd's Australia 2020 Summit in 2008. He was a visiting professor at the University of Hong Kong in 2009. He worked as Executive Director of the Lowy Institute for International Policy from June 2009 to August 2012. He became the Dean of the College of the Asia and the Pacific at the Australian National University before moving to the University of Melbourne in 2019.

== Bibliography ==
Michael Wesley has authored several books on foreign policy, including:

- Quarterly Essay 101: Blind Spot: Southeast Asia and Australia's future (Black Inc., 2026)
- Restless Continent: Wealth, Rivalry and Asia's New Geopolitics (Black Inc., 2015)
- There Goes the Neighbourhood: Australia and the Rise of Asia (UNSW Press, 2011)
- The Howard Paradox: Australian Diplomacy in Asia (ABC Books, 2007)
- Editor. Making Australian Foreign Policy, Second Edition (expanded and updated), (Melbourne: Cambridge University Press, 2007) (with Allan Gyngell)
- Editor. The Other Special Relationship: United States-Australia Relations at the Start of the Twenty-First Century, Carlisle, PA: Strategic Studies Institute, 2007 (with Jeffrey D. McCausland, Douglas T Stuart and William T. Tow)
- Energy Security in Asia, (London: Routledge Curzon, 2007)
- Editor. Making Australian Foreign Policy, First Edition, (Melbourne: Cambridge University Press, 2003) (with Allan Gyngell)
- Regional Organisations of the Asia-Pacific: Exploring Institutional Change, (Basingstoke: Palgrave Macmillan, 2003)
- Casualties of the New World Order: The Causes of Failure of UN Missions to Civil Wars (Basingstoke: Macmillan, 1997)
