= The Howard Paradox =

2007 book by Michael Wesley

- Author: Michael Wesley
- Language: English
- Genre: Non-fiction
- Publication date: 2007

The Howard Paradox: Australian Diplomacy in Asia is a 2007 book by Professor Michael Wesley. The book explores whether Australia's alliance with the United States advances or undermines Australia's relations with Asia.

It notes the Howard government's significant foreign policy successes in the Asia region including close diplomatic relations with Asian leaders and obtaining a seat at the East Asian Summit, which the author says confounded those critical of the early years of the Howard government. It also examines the impact of John Howard’s "vigorous identification with the West rather than Asia". Discussion of Alexander Downer also features in the book, with his recognition of Australia's interest in "practical regionalism" not "emotional regionalism".

== See also ==
- High and Dry (book)
- The Times Will Suit Them
