= Rabia Zuberi =

Pakistani sculptor and painter (c.1941–2022)

- Born: 1940; Kanpur, United Provinces, British Raj (now Uttar Pradesh, India)
- Died: 16 January 2022 (aged 81); Karachi, Pakistan
- Education: Aligarh Muslim University; Lucknow College of Arts and Crafts
- Known for: Sculpture, Painting, Drawing
- Relatives: Hajra Mansoor (sister)
- Awards: Pride of Performance (2010)

Rabia Zuberi (1940 – 16 January 2022), sometimes referred to in Pakistan as Queen Mother of Arts, was a Pakistani sculptor, painter, former chairperson of the Pakistan Arts Council, teacher and Pakistan's first woman sculptor. She produced most of her work after immigrating to Pakistan. Some of her drawings include Duputta, Quest for Peace, and some sculptures titled Peace Message from the Progressive World and Peace Message were acquired by the National Art Gallery, Pakistan during an exhibition in 2003.

== Early life ==
She was born in 1940 in United Province, British India (now Kanpur, Uttar Pradesh, India). She graduated from the Aligarh Muslim University in 1959 and later moved to Lucknow where she attended Lucknow College of Arts and Crafts along with her sister, Hajra Mansoor. Following the partition of India, her family migrated to Pakistan in 1961, while she and her sister studied in India, and later they moved to Karachi in 1964.

== Career ==
She was involved in paintings at an apparent age of ten. Before migrating to Pakistan, she participated in annual exhibitions at the All-India Youth Art Exhibitions, Delhi where she was awarded uncertain prizes from 1960 to 1963. In 2010, the government of Pakistan awarded her the Pride of Performance in recognition of her paintings, depicting an orphan with visage.

She created two life-sized sculptures of iron and fiberglass for the Pakistan Navy in 1978 when she was commissioned by the federal government of Pakistan to work for the presidency. The statue was later installed at Zamzama Park. She was also commissioned to create a statue for an industrial organization and public and private architectural structures in Islamabad. In 1964, she established Karachi School of Art, an art and entertainment institution.

Her life is covered in a book titled Rabia Zuberi: Life and Work by Marjorie Husain which was published in 2009. Her career was covered in a book titled Unveiling the Visible: Lives and Works of Women Artists of Pakistan by Salima Hashmi which was published in 2002. The book Rabia Zuberi: Life & Works, according to the Hindustan Times doesn't cover about her migration to Pakistan.

== Personal life and death ==
Zuberi died in Karachi on 16 January 2022, at the age of 81.

== Books ==
- Zuberi, Rabia; Husain, Marjorie (2008). Rabia Zuberi: Life and Work. Foundation for Museum of Modern Art. ISBN 9789698896041.
- Hashmi, Salima (2002). Unveiling the Visible: Lives and Works of Women Artists of Pakistan. ActionAid Pakistan. ISBN 9789693513615.

== Awards and recognition ==
- Pride of Performance Award by the President of Pakistan in 2010
