= Shyam Sharma (printmaker) =

Indian printmaker (born 1941)

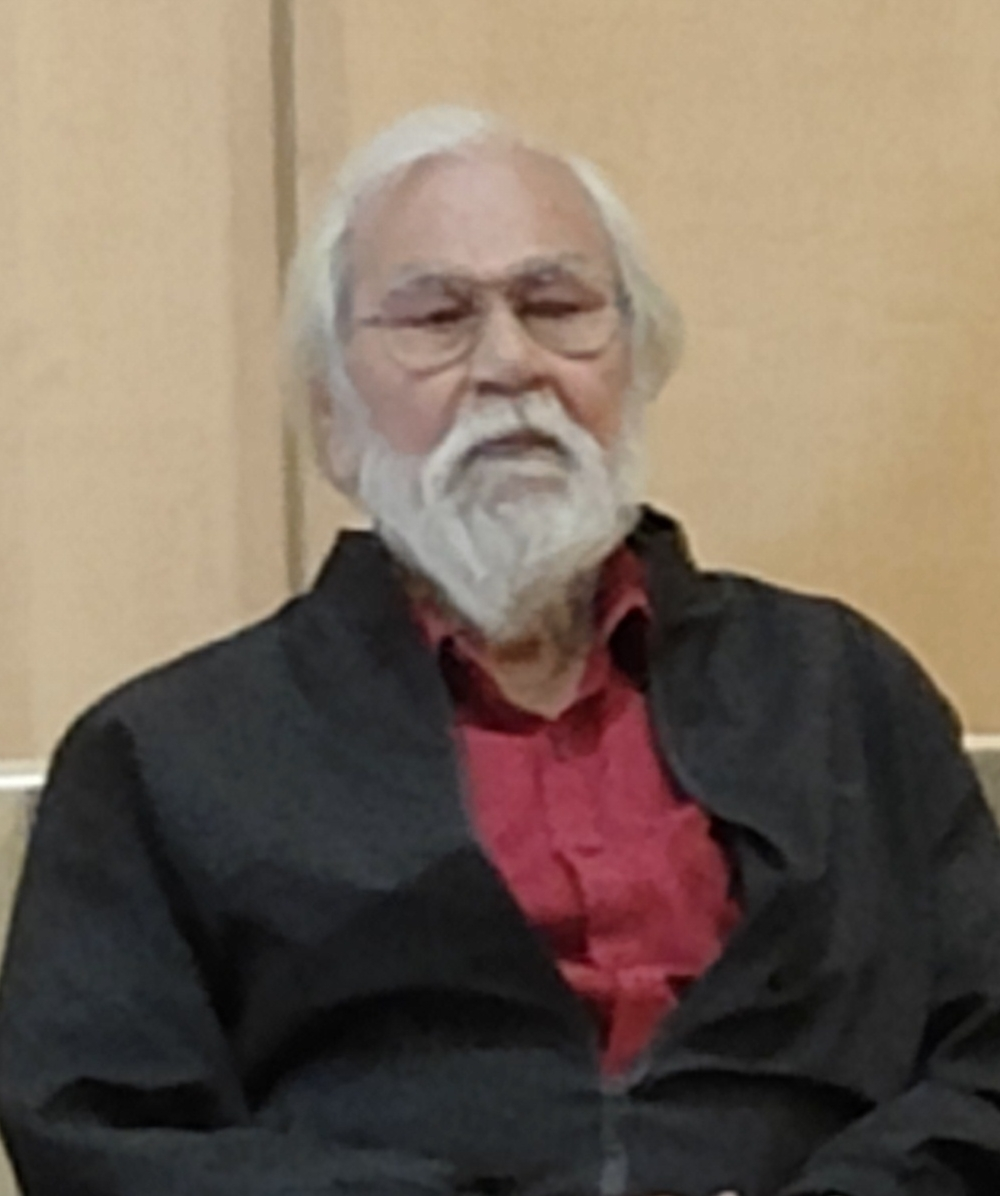
- Born: 8 February 1941 (age 85); Mathura, India
- Education: College of Arts and Crafts, Lucknow

Shyam Sunder Sharma is an Indian print artist, author and poet.

== Childhood and education ==
Sharma was born on 8 February 1941 in Mathura, Uttar Pradesh. His father also ran a printing press in Baraily. He learned the art of printmaking from his maternal grandfather. Later, he was enrolled in Lucknow University to receive his higher education in Fine Arts.

When asked how he got involved in printmaking, Sharma said, "While at my father's printing press, the prints were developed from machines, at the College of Arts and Crafts, Lucknow. I later learnt how to develop handmade prints and got hooked on it."

== Career ==
Sharma started his career in 1966 as a lecturer at College of Arts and Crafts, Patna where he rose to become head of the Department of Printmaking and later the Principal.

His works have been displayed in solo and group exhibitions around the world. He has also been a member of the General Council of Lalit Kala Academy and the Chairman of the Advisory Board of National Modern Art Gallery, Delhi.

== Publications ==
Sharma has authored numerous books. Some of them are:

1. Safed Sanp (a poetry collection)
2. Syah
3. Dekha Dekhi Baat (plays)
4. Gandhi Aur Suktiyan
5. Kashth Chhapa Kala
6. Chitrakala aur Bihar
7. Patna Qualam (Philosophy, Art history).

== Awards ==
- National Award by Lalit Kala Academy, Delhi
- Padma Shri by the Government of India
- International Print Biennial in Netherlands
