= Afsar Madad Naqvi =

Syed Afsar Madad Naqvi سید افسر مدد نقوی
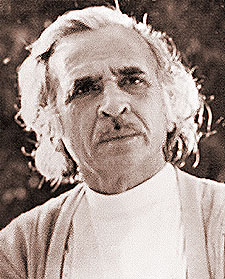
- Born: Syed Afsar Madad Naqvi; 10 August 1933; Amroha, British India
- Died: 11 January 1997 (aged 63); Karachi, Sindh, Pakistan
- Known for: Sculpture, painting, murals
- Movement: Indian art

Syed Afsar Madad Naqvi (Urdu: سید افسر مدد نقوی; 10 August 1933 – 11 January 1997) was a Pakistani sculptor who was known for his pure realistic monumental sculptures which can be seen in many places around the country (such as Roshan Khan/Jahangir Khan Squash Complex, Fleet Club, Arts Council of Pakistan, Markaz-e-Sadaat-e-Amroha Centre, Hasan Square Karachi, Star Gate Karachi, Quaid-e-Azam International Airport, Village Restaurant, Metropol Hotel). He was a founder member of the Central Institute of Arts and Crafts Karachi.

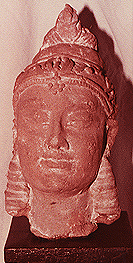

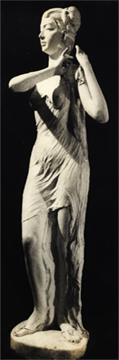

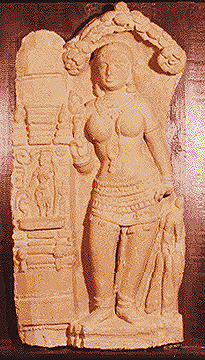

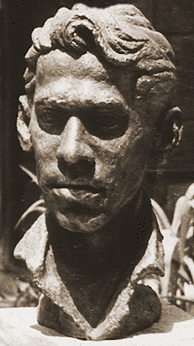

== Early life and education ==
Afsar Madad Naqvi was born in 1933 at Amroha, India. Diploma and Post-diploma from the Government College of Arts and Crafts, Lucknow, India. Trained under renowned sculptor Mohammad Hanif at Lucknow College of Arts and Crafts in the early 60s.

== Career ==
He was one of the few qualified sculptors who could teach the technique of making life-size armature, simple casting and multiple casting with permanent moulds. He worked with great ease and facility in metals, wood, cement, Plaster of Paris, marble, stone and clay.

He came to Pakistan in 1962 and shortly after that and had a solo show at the Karachi Arts Council Hall, which was also the country's first solo sculpture exhibition. When Mr. Nawabzada Wajid Mehmood founded the Central Institute of Arts and Crafts, he requested him to set up the sculpture studio.

== Biography (by year) ==
1933 – Born- Amroha, India

1960 – Diploma and Post-diploma- Government College of Arts and Crafts Lucknow, India

1962 – Migration- Pakistan, Karachi

1962 – Joined Central Institute of Art & Crafts, Karachi as Head of Sculpture Department

1963 – Solo Exhibition- Arts Council of Pakistan, Karachi

1969 – Solo Exhibition- Pakistan American Cultural Centre (P.A.C.C.)

1971 – Solo Exhibition- Indus Gallery, Karachi

1975 – Solo Exhibition- Arts Council of Pakistan, Karachi

1985 – Group Exhibition- The Fifth National Arts Exhibition, Idara Saqafat -e- Pakistan

1992 – Joined North City School of Art & Architecture, Karachi as Principle and Head of Fine Art (Sculpture) Department

1995 – Founded Bhittai Institute of Art & Crafts

1997 – Death

1997 – Solo Exhibition – A tribute to Afsar Madad Naqvi, Arts Council of Pakistan, Karachi

== Specialization ==
Specialized in portraiture, mural work, and terra-cotta. He has done lot of masterpiece sculptures in wood, metal, plaster, cement and terra-cotta. Indian Classical sculpture, Naqvi's ability to be able to capture in wood, stone or metal the essence of a narrative moment with a dramatic naturalistic realism.
