= Karachi School of Art =

Art school in Karachi, Pakistan

- دانش کدہَ فنون ، کراچی KSA Logo Final.jpg
- Former names: Mina Art School
- Type: Private
- Established: 1964
- Affiliations: UoK & SBTE
- Principal: Rabia Zuberi
- Students: 350
- Undergraduates: 3000+
- Location: Karachi, Sindh, Pakistan
- Nickname: KSA
- Website: ksa.edu.pk

Karachi School of Art (KSA) (Urdu: دانش کدہَ فنون ، کراچی) is a college of art in Karachi, Pakistan. Founded in 1964 by Rabia Zuberi, it was the first private art center in Pakistan and the first art institution of any kind in Karachi.

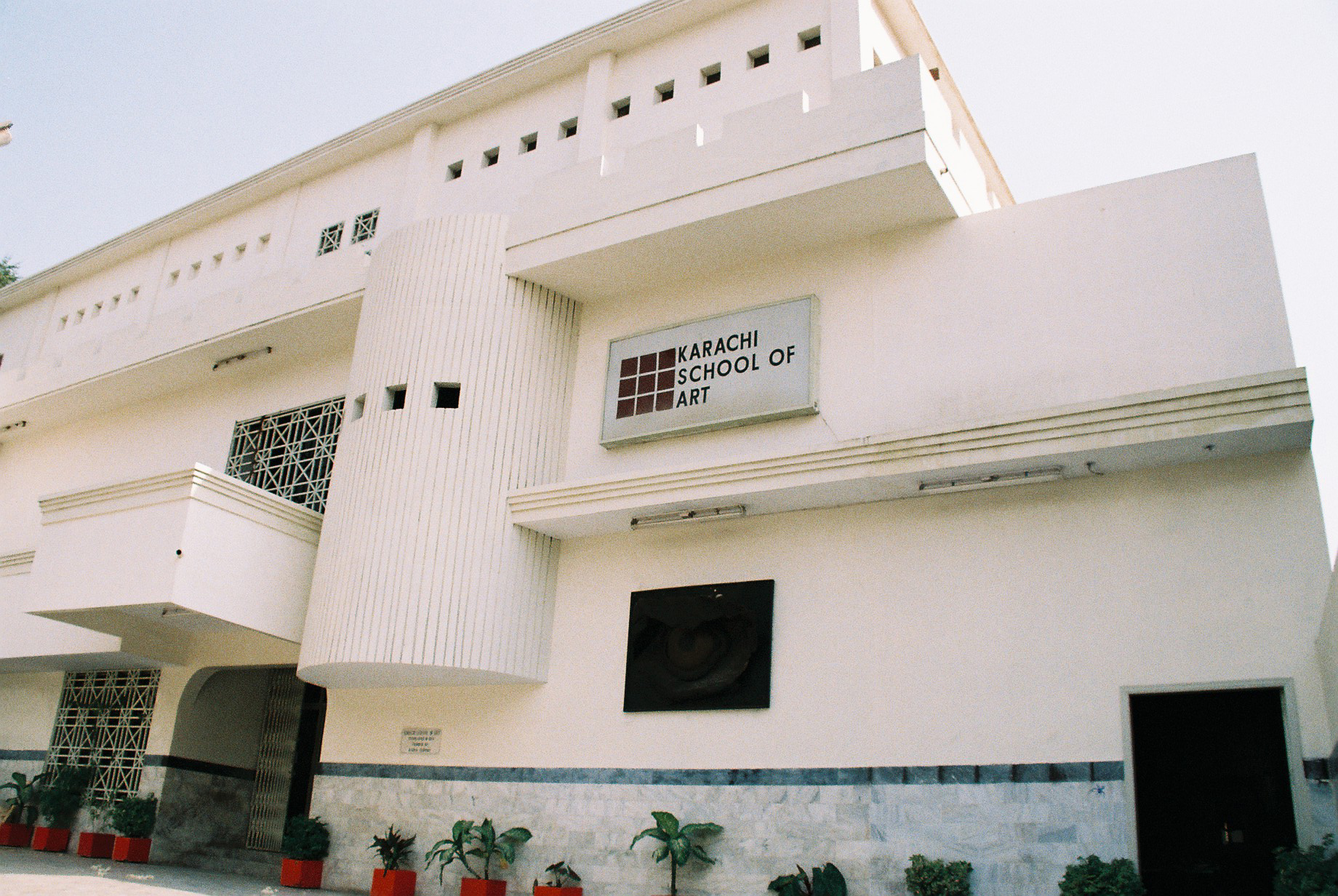
KSA Campus

== Courses ==
Degree

- 4 years Bachelors in design & media arts
- 4 Years Bachelors in textile design

Diploma

- 4 Years Diploma in fine arts
- 4 Years Diploma in communication design
- 4 Years Diploma in textile design
- 2 Years Diploma in digital media

== Departments ==
=== Fine Art ===
Department of Fine Art Offers four years diploma in Fine Arts with the major and minor subjects of painting, sculpture, and printmaking. At the end of the fourth-year, students must submit a thesis, which is evaluated by a panel of jurors.

The department has painting and drawing studios, a printmaking workshop with two etching presses, a sculpture studio and w3orkshop with gas and electric welding plants, fiberglass and Mattel casting facilities; a ceramics department with a ball mill, glaze and material testing laboratory and a kiln

=== Communication Design ===
Communication design is a four-year diploma program in the field of graphic design and advertising. Studies include the development of analytical techniques and drawing skills, the history of graphic design and its formal vocabulary i.e. colors, composition typography. In advance levels, students get more challenging studies where class assignments are taken more like real advertising campaign.

The department has visiting faculty and a computer lab.

=== Digital Media ===
KSA offers two years diploma courses in Digital Media. Computer graphics and concepts related to software and hardware are the main aim of these courses. The courses also support the understanding related to the new interactive products, hypermedia production .

The courses offer training in Computer Graphics Systems, in-depth knowledge on technology, methodology, and application relevant to the design production of Computer Graphics.

== Selected achievements ==
- Truck Art Caravan 1994 . A truck decorated by art students loaded with a mobile gallery traveled from Peshawar to Karachi in a month, holding local exhibits.
- Artist Exchange Program 1997 in collaboration with Glasgow Museum of Transport. KSA sponsored the stay of an English artist Nicola Griffith to study Pakistani trucks, buses, rickshaw, taxis and carts. A KSA student, Afshan Abid, was invited to Scotland to work and decorate two most modern vehicles — a road liner and a commuter van — in the context of typical Pakistani decoration. The road liner was kept in regular services in decorated state for six month. The commuter van became the permanent exhibit of the museum.
- Top seven positions in Athena Awards 1996, conducted by One to One communication.
- National awards secured by KSA artists
- Participation in Sheraton Art Festival every year. Since the beginning of this local event KSA has been the largest contributor amongst all art institutions of Karachi.
- Commissioned paintings for Oman (Masquat). In August 1999, a group of five KSA artists — Abid Hassan, A.Q. Arif, Shariq Ayaz, Zia Haider and Moazam Ilyas Jilani — were invited at Oman's national day celebrations. The assignment was to paint on mesh and plywood surfaces. The huge paintings were displayed on eminent spots in the capital.
