= Frank Wesley =

Indian-Australian artist

- Born: December 1923; Azamgarh, India
- Died: 2002
- Known for: Painting, drawing, wood carvings
- Notable work: Blue Madonna, Forgiving Father

Frank Wesley (1923-2002) was an internationally recognised Indian-Australian artist.

== Biography ==
Wesley was born in Azamgarh, Uttar Pradesh into a fifth generation Christian family of Hindu and Muslim descent. Wesley studied painting at the Lucknow School of Arts and Crafts. He continued on to postgraduate studies at the same college, and worked as faculty. He spent five years (1954-1958) at the College of Fine Arts in Kyoto, Japan, where he studied art, especially wood block printing.

After two years (1958-1960) in the United States at the Art Institute of Chicago, Wesley returned to India. He moved to Australia in 1973 and lived in Nambour, Queensland. He died in 2002.

== Work ==
Wesley belongs to the Lucknow school of painting. His paintings reflect this influence and that of the Chughtai school of painting that flourished in India at the turn of the century. Wesley made art based on both biblical and secular themes. He used water colours, oil paintings, miniatures and wooden carvings.

Wesley's painting "Blue Madonna" was used for the first UNICEF Christmas card, while five of his paintings were exhibited at the 1950 Holy Year Exhibition in the Vatican. He is also known for designing the funeral urn for Mahatma Gandhi's ashes.

In 1993, Naomi Wray published a book titled "Frank Wesley: Exploring faith with a brush" about his Christian work.
