= Hajra Mansoor =

Pakistani painter (born 1945)

- Born: Hajra Zuberi; 29 August 1945 (age 80); Bareilly, British India
- Other names: Ambassador of the East; Modern Romanticist; Zuberi Sisters
- Education: Government College of Art & Craft
- Occupation: Painter
- Years active: 1964–present
- Spouse: Mansoor Rahi (m. 1969; died 2024) (husband)
- Children: 2
- Relatives: Rabia Zuberi (sister)
- Honours: Pride of Performance (2009)

Hajra Mansoor (née Zuberi) is a Pakistani artist and painter, celebrated as an "Ambassador of the East" and a "Modern Romanticist" for her fusion of traditional Mughal miniature art with modern artistic sensibilities. A graduate of the Government College of Art & Craft in Lucknow, she is a co-founder of the Karachi School of Art and is married to fellow contemporary artist Mansoor Rahi.

== Early life and education ==
Hajra was born in Bareilly, British India, in 1945. While her two elder sisters, Rabia and Fareeda, focused on fine arts, she initially studied music and dance. When her parents migrated to Pakistan in 1961, she was a teenager and went to live with her uncle in Lucknow. Although initially preparing for pre-medical studies, she changed her path and enrolled in art school with her sister Rabia Zuberi.

In 1964, she graduated from the Government College of Art & Craft in Lucknow with a diploma in painting. Soon after, she and her sister Rabia, who majored in sculpture, migrated to Pakistan. The sisters, known as the "Zuberi Sisters," played a pivotal role in the country's art scene by establishing the Karachi School of Art.

== Career ==
Hajra Mansoor is considered one of Pakistan's senior-most female artists and a pioneer in the field of art. She and her husband worked tirelessly to not only create their own art but also to mentor younger generations.

Mansoor's paintings create a "dreamy world full of romance, music, and aura". Her distinct, lyrical style is influenced by the Mughal miniature tradition but utilizes modern media and techniques. Her female-centric paintings often depict women in quiet, intimate moments, with exaggerated, stylized features such as large, colored eyes and delicate lips.

Over her career, Mansoor's work has evolved through several stylistic phases, including:

- Academic Realism
- Oriental Intuitionism
- Neo-Romanticism

=== Painting exhibits ===
Hajra Mansoor has had a prolific career, holding solo exhibitions almost every year since her graduation in 1964. Her works have been displayed in numerous countries, including Bangladesh, China, England, France, Germany, Hong Kong, India, Iran, Japan, Turkey and United States.

Notable international exhibitions include:

- 1984: Grand Palace, Paris.
- 1985: Gallery Alma Mosi, Paris.
- 1988: Gallery "Hans Haiden ham," Düsseldorf, West Germany.
- 2000: United Nations-sponsored exhibition in New York.

== Personal life ==
In 1969, Hajra Mansoor married the distinguished contemporary painter Mansoor Rahi. The couple had a daughter, Saima Rahi. The two artists had distinct styles, with Mansoor Rahi known for his Cubist works, but were united by their shared passion and dedication to art.

The couple initially worked together at the Karachi School of Art before later moving to Islamabad. They built a home there, where they established their private studios and continued to collaborate on their art.

In 2024, after her husband's death, Hajra lodged a police report against her son for the alleged theft of 70 to 80 of Mansoor Rahi's paintings. The paintings were reportedly stolen from the family home in Islamabad.

== Awards and recognition ==
Mansoor has been recognized with multiple national and international awards for her contributions to the field of art, including:

- 1966: Second prize at the Karachi Arts Exhibition.
- Hajra is the recipient of the National 1969 Chughtai Award Chughtai Award in the All Pakistan National Exhibition sponsored by the Pakistan National Council of Arts PNCA.
- 1982: First prize in the Haidar Awards, organized by the Abasin Arts Council.
- 1996: Chughtai Award from the Pakistan National Council of Arts.
- 2009: Pride of Performance from the President of Pakistan.
- Jamshoro Life Time Achievement Award.

== Legacy ==
Together with her husband, Hajra Mansoor established Pakistan's first academic museum of paintings in their Islamabad home, which serves as a research museum and gallery showcasing a vast collection of their work. The couple also mentored aspiring artists through an apprenticeship program rather than traditional courses.
