= Big Brother 2012 =

Big Brother 2012 may refer to:

- Big Brother Australia 2012
- Big Brother 2012 (Denmark)
- Big Brother 2012 (Sweden)
- Big Brother 2012 (UK)
- Big Brother 14 (U.S.)
- Celebrity Big Brother 2012 (UK season 9)
- Celebrity Big Brother 2012 (UK season 10)
- Big Brother Brasil 12
- Bigg Boss (season 6), the 2012-2013 edition of Big Brother in India in Hindi
