= Big Brother (Swedish TV series) season 9 =

Ninth season of the Swedish Big Brother Television Series

Big Brother
- Season 9
- Presented by: Malin Stenbäck (until 18 March 2021); Arantxa Álvarez
- No. of days: 99
- Winner: Tanja Helen Ingebretsen Kallin
- Runner-up: Nardos Alberto
- Companion show: Bara Huset

Release
- Original network: Sjuan; C More (Stream; Live); TV4 Play (Stream)
- Original release: 15 February – 24 May 2021

Season chronology
- ← Previous; Season 8

Big Brother Sverige 2021 is the ninth and final season of the Swedish Big Brother.

The ninth season was announced by TV4 on 12 October 2020. It was also announced the season would start on 15 February 2021. This season was planned to run for 99 days. The prize for the winner is 1,000,000 kr.

On 27 January 2021, it was announced that Malin Stenbäck will return to present the live shows with Arantxa Alvarez. Also, the host duo will be accompanied by comedian Kirsty Armstrong; she would talk more about the events from inside the house. YouTuber Filip Dikmen will take part in the studio shows and give judgments and analyses about the housemates' behavior.

The premiere was held on Monday, 15 February 2021, on Sjuan. Weekly live shows are being shown on Mondays. New studio shows are broadcast from Tuesday to Thursday and classic Big Brother daily shows are shown from Friday to Sunday. There were live streams with multiple camera angles on C More, and there were the best clips continuously published on TV4 Play. Because viewers wanted more content of the house, a show named Bara Huset began airing on Thursday, 18 February 2021, as a test run. This show summarizes the best events from the past day.

For this season, the logo of the show remains the same as last season. The Big Brother house was slightly redecorated, with the confession room remaining the same.

The format of this season remains the same as the previous season. Housemates are allowed to talk about nominations if they want after that week's nominees were reported to the house.

On Thursday, 18 March 2021, one of the hosts, Malin Stenbäck, revealed during the studio show that this was her last show for this season. The reason is that she is also the host of Bachelor Sverige and Bachelorette Sverige, and the recording of these two shows will start soon and the schedule will collide with Big Brother. Arantxa Alvarez continued to host the show as usual.

== Housemates ==
On Day 1, during the launch show, 10 housemates entered the Big Brother house. For the first time in Big Brother Sverige history, 2 additional housemates Jesper and Pontus did not enter the house. Instead, they had to live in a motorhome for a period of time. On Day 2 evening, after housemates completed the squirrel wheel task, Jesper and Pontus moved into the house as the award.

On the morning of Day 11, the first "Joker" of the season, Tanja, entered the house as a new housemate. On Day 13, the second "Joker", Adrian, entered the house.

On Day 22, a new audition started to search for new housemates.

On Day 26, Madelene entered the house. On Day 32, Alexander entered the house. On Day 39, Jaqueline entered the house. On Day 41, Dennis entered the house.

On Day 43, three returning players from the last season entered the house. They were Julia, Mergim and Victoria.

Name	Age on entry	Hometown	Occupation	Day entered	Day exited	Status
Tanja Helen Ingebretsen Kallin	22	Vänersborg	YouTuber; Participant of the fifteenth season Paradise Hotel Sverige	11	99	Winner
Nardos Alberto/Abraha	23	Solna	Unemployed	1	99	Runner-up
Emelie Karolina Svensson	24	Ystad	Student	1	99	Third place
Carl Anders Simon Ejdertoft	26	Hägersten, Stockholm	Unemployed	1	97	Evicted
Madelene Wiktoria Billman	33	Stockholm	Stylist	26	94	Evicted
Judith Ellen Amanda Nodby	27	Hägersten, Stockholm	Chef and refrigeration technician	1	93	Evicted
Peter Pedram Aghabeh	25	Upplands Väsby	IT consultant	1	92	Evicted
Adrian Markus Podde	30	Lund	Salesman	13	85	Evicted
Dennis Christer Petter Asteson	30	Saltsjö-boo	Student	41	78	Evicted
Joel Kosari	20	Tavelsjö, Umeå	Store salesman	1	73	Walked
Mergim Feka	22	Hässleholm	Bartender and warehouse worker; Former housemate of Big Brother Sverige 2020	43	71	Evicted
Jaqueline Synnöve Simona Lysholm	25	Huddinge	Model	39	64	Evicted
Stephanie Emily Harvey	26	Sundbyberg	Postwoman	1	57	Evicted
Julia Aleksandra Löfgren	31	Handen, Stockholm	Entrepreneur, Driver and nail salon owner; Former housemate of Big Brother Sverige 2020	43	55	Walked
Thimmy Alexander Eklund	23	Eskilstuna	Music teacher	32	50	Evicted
Victoria Klöfver Rama	22	Östersund	Flight attendant; Former housemate of Big Brother Sverige 2020	43	48	Ejected
Susanne Mildred Katarina "Katti" Göransson	58	Gualöv, Bromölla	Assistant nurse and choir leader	1	43	Evicted
Pontus Simon Ola Andersen	30	Karlshamn/Malmö	Artist and musician; One of the music duo "Coola Kids"	1 (Motorhome)	36	Evicted
Therese Skog	30	Stockholm	Administrator at Örebro University	1	29	Evicted
Bo André Luis Eduardo Lindberg	47	Borås	Leisure educator	1	22	Evicted
Ulf Sture Jesper Fröidh	42	Ängelholm	Leisure educator; Participant of the fifth season of Paradise Hotel Sverige	1 (Motorhome)	15	Evicted

== Game history & nominations table ==
=== Qualifying Game Phase (Week 1 - Week 8) ===
This housemate won the weekly team competition and safe for the week.
This housemate was nominated for lost the weekly team competition.
This housemate was nominated for lost the weekly team competition, but was saved by winning the immunity competition.
This housemate was nominated for lost the weekly team competition, but was saved by the public vote.
This housemate was nominated for lost the weekly team competition, but was saved by housemate(s).
This housemate was nominated for lost the weekly team competition, but was saved by Friday's competition winner.
This housemate was automatically nominated for eviction by Big Brother for disciplinary measure.
This housemate was a new entry into the house.

	Week 1				Week 2				Week 3					Week 4					Week 5					Week 6					Week 7				Week 8				
Day	3	4	5	6	9	10	11	12	16	17	18	19	20	23	24	25	26	27	30	31	32	33	34	37	38	39	40	41	44	45	46	47	51	52	53	54	55
Nominated	Team competition								Pairs					Team competition										Individual					Team competition								
Nominated	Emelie; Joel; Judith; Katti; Nardos; Stephanie				Emelie; Jesper; Joel; Katti; Pedram; Stephanie				Adrian & Emelie; Joel & Tanja; Katti & Pedram; Luis & Therese; Nardos & Simon; Pontus & Stephanie					Adrian; Katti; Simon; Stephanie; Tanja; Therese					All; Housemates																		
Saved by
Immunity competition	Judith				Emelie				Judith	Adrian & Emelie; Pontus & Stephanie				Adrian					Adrian, Katti & Nardos; Joel, Judith & Madelene; Pedram					Simon; Pedram; Tanja; Emelie; Alexander; Judith; Jaqueline; Joel					Julia; Dennis; Stephanie; Mergim; Adrian; Pedram; Tanja; Simon; Joel; Jaqueline				Dennis; Joel; Madelene; Pedram; Adrian; Jaqueline; Mergim; Tanja				
Public vote									Joel & Tanja					Tanja										Nardos									Emelie; Nardos				
Housemate(s)	Joel; Stephanie				Stephanie														Simon																		
Friday's competition winner					Joel by Therese				Pedram by Adrian					Simon by Pontus					Emelie by Adrian										Nardos by Mergim								
Tanja	Not in House						Stephanie	New; Entry	none	Nominated			Saved	Win	Lose	Katti	Lose	Saved	Nominated					Student	Teacher				Nominated	Saved		Alexander	Recruit			Saved	
Nardos	Lose				Win		Joel	Win	none	Nominated				Lose	Win	Katti	Win		Saved					Student				Saved	Nominated			Saved	General				
Emelie	Lose		Stephanie to block	Lose	Lose	Saved	Joel	Saved	none	Saved				Win	Win	Therese	Win		Nominated			Saved		Student	Teacher				Nominated				General				
Simon	Win				Win		Stephanie	Win	none	Nominated				Win	Lose	Katti	Saved		Nominated				Saved	Teacher					Nominated		Saved	Alexander	Recruit	Recruit			
Madelene	Not in House																New; Entry		Nominated	Saved				Student					Nominated				Commander				
Judith	Lose	Saved	Katti to block	Saved	Win		Pedram	Win	Immuned					Lose	Win	Adrian	Win		Nominated	Saved				Student		Teacher			Nominated				Recruit	Recruit			
Pedram	Win				Lose				none	Nominated		Saved		Win	Win	Katti	Win		Nominated		Saved			Teacher					Nominated	Saved		?	~~Commander~~; Recruit	Saved			
Adrian	Not in House								none	Saved				Win	Lose	Simon	Big; Farmer		Saved					Student	Nominated				Nominated	Saved		?	Recruit	Commander			
Dennis	Not in House																											New; Entry	Saved			?	Commander				
Joel	Lose		Saved		Lose			Saved	none	Nominated			Saved	Lose	Win	Simon	Win		Nominated	Saved				Student			Saved		Nominated		Saved	Alexander	Commander				
Mergim	Not in House																												Nominated	Saved		Emelie	Recruit		Saved		
Jaqueline	Not in House																									New Entry; Teacher			Nominated		Saved	?	Recruit	Commander			Recruit
Stephanie	Lose		Nardos to block	Saved	Lose		Saved		none	Nominated	Saved			Win	Lose	Katti	Lose		Nominated					Student					Saved			Emelie	Recruit	Recruit			
Julia	Not in House																												Saved			Alexander	Recruit	Recruit			Walked (Day 55)
Alexander	Not in House																				New; Entry			Student		Teacher			Nominated			~~Duel~~	Evicted (Day 50)				
Victoria	Not in House																												Nominated			~~Duel~~	Ejected (Day 48)				
Katti	Lose		Emelie to block	Lose	Lose				none	Nominated	Nominated			Lose	Lose	Adrian	In Croft	Lose	Saved					Student					Evicted (Day 43)								
Pontus	Win				Win		Jesper	Win	none	Nominated	Saved			Lose	Win	Katti	Win		Nominated					Evicted (Day 36)													
Therese	Win				Win		Stephanie	Win	none	Nominated				Lose	Lose	Katti	Lose		Evicted (Day 29)																		
Luis	Win				Win		Katti	Win	none	Nominated				Evicted (Day 22)																							
Jesper	Win				Lose				Evicted (Day 15)																												
Notes	1, 2, 3, 4, 5				6, 7, 8, 9, 10				11, 12, 13, 14, 15, 16					17, 18, 19, 20, 21					22, 23, 24, 25, 26, 27					28, 29, 30, 31, 32, 33, 34					35, 36, 37, 38, 39, 40				41, 42, 43, 44, 45, 46				
Against public vote	Emelie; Katti; Nardos				Katti; Jesper; Pedram				Katti; Luis; Nardos; Simon; Therese					Katti; Stephanie; Therese					Pontus; Stephanie; Tanja					Adrian; Katti; Madelene; Stephanie					Alexander; ~~Victoria~~				Judith; ~~Julia~~; Simon; Stephanie				
Against public vote	Emelie; Katti; Nardos				Katti; Jesper; Pedram				Katti; Luis; Nardos; Simon; Therese					Katti; Stephanie; Therese					Pontus; Stephanie; Tanja					Adrian; Katti; Madelene; Stephanie					Alexander; Emelie; Judith; Madelene				Judith; ~~Julia~~; Simon; Stephanie				
Walked	none																																Julia				
Ejected	none																												Victoria				none				
Evicted	Nardos; ~~Fewest votes~~ ~~to save~~ punished				Jesper; Fewest votes to save				Luis; Fewest votes to save					Therese; Fewest votes to save					Pontus; Fewest votes to save					Katti; Fewest votes to save					Alexander; Most votes to remain Hang Loose				Stephanie; Fewest votes to save				
Evicted	Nardos; ~~Fewest votes~~ ~~to save~~ punished				Jesper; Fewest votes to save				Luis; Fewest votes to save					Therese; Fewest votes to save					Pontus; Fewest votes to save					Katti; Fewest votes to save					Alexander; Fewest votes to save				Stephanie; Fewest votes to save				

==== Notes ====
Week 1

- ^Note 1: Housemates were divided into two teams. Team Purple: Jesper, Luis, Pedram, Pontus, Simon, and Therese. Team Turquoise: Emelie, Joel, Judith, Katti, Nardos, and Stephanie. Team Purple won the weekly team competition and Team Turquoise lost, therefore, they were nominated.
- ^Note 2: Judith won the immunity challenge, therefore, she was safe for the week.
- ^Note 3: Joel was saved by the block-chain vote. He was the only housemate who was not blocked for immunity and safe for this week.
- ^Note 4: Because Emelie, Katti, Nardos and Stephanie were nominated, they had to make their speech to the viewers. The housemates would decide one of them would win the speech and receive immunity. The housemates chose Stephanie.
- ^Note 5: Unbeknown to the housemates, no one would be evicted on the first weekly final live show. However, the housemate with the least votes would have to start next week with a disadvantage. On the live show, it was revealed that Nardos received the least votes and she had to wear an electric shot suit.

Week 2

- ^Note 6: This week was the TV theme week. For the weekly team competition, housemates were divided into four teams according to their gender. Male gladiators: Jesper, Joel, and Pedram. Male challengers: Luis, Pontus, and Simon. Female gladiators: Emelie, Katti, and Stephanie. Female challengers: Judith, Nardos, and Therese. In the end, the challengers won this week's team competition and the gladiators lost, therefore, the gladiators had to Nominated.
- ^Note 7: Emelie won the immunity challenge, therefore, she was safe for the week.
- ^Note 8: Tanja and the safe housemates each had to give a white camel to the housemate who Nominated, depending on who they wanted to stay. The housemate who has the most camels will be saved. Stephanie received the most camels and therefore was safe for the week.
- ^Note 9: Nardos and Pedram received a warning from Big Brother for talking strategy. As a consequence, Pedram has no chance of being saved before Monday's weekly final, and Nardos is not allowed to participate in Friday's competition, where one of the awards is immunity from an upcoming nomination.
- ^Note 10: Therese won immunity during Friday's "Färgfemman" in Big Brother Bingo. She handed out the immunity to Joel, therefore, Joel was saved.

Week 3

- ^Note 11: At the end of the second weekly final live show, it was revealed that Nardos and Judith will compete head-to-head and become parents of children in a babysitting immunity challenge. Judith won and therefore was immune for the week.
- ^Note 12: This week was the Pair Week. The housemates were split into pairs of two. The pairs are: Adrian and Emelie, Luis and Therese, Katti and Pedram, Nardos and Simon, Pontus and Stephanie, and Joel and Tanja.
- ^Note 13: On Day 17, Adrian and Emelie won the first immunity competition. On Day 18, Pontus and Stephanie won the second immunity competition.
- ^Note 14: On Day 18, Katti received a warning from Big Brother due to her use of an offensive word. As a punishment, she was automatically nominated for eviction and cannot be saved before Monday's weekly final.
- ^Note 15: On Day 19, Adrian won Friday's competition. He was asked to choose who to save among Joel & Tanja, Luis & Therese, Nardos & Simon, or Pedram. He chose to save Pedram.
- ^Note 16: On Day 19, the viewers voted for their favorite pair. The pair that received the most votes will be saved from hanging loose. The voting closed on the morning of Day 20. Joel & Tanja received the most votes and therefore were saved.

Week 4

- ^Note 17: This week was the Farmen (The Farm) week. The housemates live poorly and were divided into two teams. Joel Kosari was the one who has split the team by the advantage he won on package competition last Sunday (Day 21). The teams are: Team 1 (Adrian, Katti, Simon, Stephanie, Tanja and Therese) and Team 2 (Emelie, Joel, Judith, Nardos, Pedram and Pontus).
- ^Note 18: On Day 23, the teams competed against each other for the first time and the winners got a little more comfortable and had to move to Farmen Hedemora in the living room. The losing team had to move to Farmen Skillingaryd in the pool house. In there, they had to build their own beds made of hay and led to the cup overflow for Emelie Svensson. There were six different competitions for two housemates from each team and the teams must agree on the order in which they will compete; each housemate competes only once. Each win will earn one point for the winning team. This competition is not about immunity but to determine which team goes to Farmen Hedemora or Farmen Skillingaryd. In the end, Team 1 got the most number of winning points (4), therefore, they went to Farmen Hedemora. Team 2 got the least number of winning points (2), therefore, they went to Farmen Skillingaryd.
- ^Note 19: For the team competition on Day 24, there were a total of three different competitions with two housemates from each team at a time in each competition. Team Hedemora has the privilege of choosing which two from both teams to compete in the first branch. In this round of competition, teams turned into Team Pink (Team 1) and Team Green (Team 2). In the end, with 2 to 1 winning, Team Green won, which means that Emelie, Joel, Judith, Nardos, Pedram, and Pontus were safe for the week.
- ^Note 20: For the duel on Day 25, the housemates had to vote for those who are Nominated in Farm Hedemora who will compete in a duel. The two housemates with the most votes will be chosen as fighters. The one who wins the duel becomes the Big Farmer and the one who loses will leave immediately. After the voting, it was revealed that Katti received the most votes and became the fighter. However, because there was a tie between Adrian and Simon, the public would decide who will be the second fighter. The public chose Adrian. In the end, Adrian won the duel, so he became the Big Farmer and received immunity. Katti had to leave the house immediately, however, she was moved to the croft inside the mission room.
- ^Note 21: On Day 26, a bullfighting competition took place in the house, Pontus was the winner of immunity, but he was already safe for this week. He chose to give this immunity to another housemate, Simon.
- ^Note 22: On Day 27, it was revealed that the viewers chose to save Tanja.

Week 5

- ^Note 23: This week was Hockey Week. The housemates was divided into teams and met each other in hockey matches. Pink team: Pontus, Simon and Tanja, Purple: Adrian, Katti and Nardos, Yellow: Emelie, Pedram and Stephanie, Green: Joel, Judith and Madelene. On Day 30, the Purple team (Adrian, Katti and Nardos) won the first tournament. Therefore, they were saved.
- ^Note 24: On Day 31, the Green team (Joel, Judith and Madelene) won the second tournament. Therefore, they were saved.
- ^Note 25: On Day 32, for today's "Air Hockey" immunity competition, only three housemates were able to compete in the final match. Housemates who were Hanging Loose would compete with each other on qualifying matches before the final match. Emelie, Pedram, and Tanja advanced to the final match. In the end, Pedram won the final match, therefore, he was saved.
- ^Note 26: On Day 33, Adrian won today's competition and he had to save one Hanging Loose housemate. He chose Emelie.
- ^Note 27: Because Pontus, Simon, Stephanie, and Tanja were nominated, they had to make their speech to the viewers. The housemates would decide who among them would win the speech and receive immunity. The housemates chose Simon.

Week 6

- ^Note 28: This week was School Week. All housemates started as students and competed against each other during the week. On the afternoon of Day 37, housemates have a knowledge test with the master knowledge bird. The one who got the most right answers on the test would be immune and also became the teacher for the rest of the week. In the end, Simon won, therefore, he became the teacher and received immunity.
- ^Note 29: Teacher Simon's test took place on the afternoon of Day 37. Pedram won, therefore, he became a teacher alongside Simon and also received immunity.
- ^Note 30: Teacher Pedram's test took place on the morning of Day 38. Tanja won, therefore, she became a teacher and also received immunity.
- ^Note 31: Teacher Tanja's test took place on the afternoon of Day 38. In the end, Tanja won, therefore, she became a teacher and also received immunity.
- ^Note 32: On Day 38, Adrian was automatically nominated for eviction by Big Brother due to his offensive word. He cannot be saved before Monday's weekly final.
- ^Note 33: Alexander, Judith and Jaqueline were both saved on teachers' tests respectively and they became teachers.
- ^Note 34: On Day 40, Joel was saved on Filip Dikmen's test.

Week 7

- ^Note 35: This week was the Challenger Week. The housemates were split into teams by Mergim after the viewers voted for him as a team divider. Teams had to compete for immunity in different challenges. The teams are: Team Mergim: Mergim, Adrian, Pedram and Tanja. Team Victoria: Victoria, Alexander and Emelie. Team Julia: Julia, Stephanie and Dennis. Team Nardos: Nardos, Madelene and Judith. Team Simon: Simon, Jaqueline and Joel. After the competition on Day 44, Team Julia won, and they were safe for the week.
- ^Note 36: For the competition on Day 45, only one place was left for Mergim and Victoria to compete for immunity. For the one who does not become immune, the viewers must decide if that person should remain in the house. Team Mergim won the competition and they were safe for the week. The public would decide Victoria's fate.
- ^Note 37: On Day 46, Team Simon won the competition and they were safe for the week.
- ^Note 38: In the morning of Day 47, a voting duel took place. The saved housemates should choose one of nominated housemates who would face Victoria in a voting duel. After the housemates voted in the confession room, it was revealed that the housemates chose Alexander. The viewers would have to vote for who they wanted to be allowed to stay in the house; one of them would be evicted on Sunday.
- ^Note 39: The saved housemates compete for immunity. The winner, Mergim, won the competition and he had to save one nominated housemate. He chose to save Nardos.
- ^Note 40: Victoria was ejected due to repeated violations of the rules and breaches of integrity. The voting duel between Victoria and Alexander has been cancelled. Instead, it is up to the viewers to decide whether Alexander should continue to Nominated or not. It was revealed that the public chose Alexander to remain Nominated.

Week 8

- ^Note 41: This week was the Military week. The housemates were split into Generals and Recruits. After Alexander's eviction, the public voted for two housemates to become Generals; they chose Emelie and Nardos. The Generals would be immune for the week. The rest of the housemates were Recruits and were split into teams: Team Pink - Julia, Jaqueline, Simon, and Tanja; Team Yellow - Adrian, Judith, Mergim, and Stephanie; and Team Turquoise - Dennis, Madelene, Joel, and Pedram.
- ^Note 42: Team Turquoise won the team challenge on the afternoon of Day 51. Dennis, Madelene, Joel, and Pedram were promoted to Commanders and were safe for the week. However, the viewers voted for Pedram as the housemate who was not up to standard and tough enough, therefore, he was demoted to Recruit but is still safe for the week.
- ^Note 43: For the team competition on Day 52, the Recruits were split into three teams: Team Pink - Stephanie & Julia; Team Yellow - Judith & Simon; and Team Green - Jacki & Adrian. Team Green won and were safe for the week.
- ^Note 44: On Day 53, Mergim passed the IQ test, therefore, she was saved for the week.
- ^Note 45: On Day 55, Jaqueline received the most votes from the public; she was demoted and was once again being recruited.
- ^Note 46: On Day 55, Julia left the house voluntarily for personal reasons.

=== Final Game Phase (Week 9 - Week 14) ===
This housemate won the immunity competition.
This housemate won a special nomination power.
This housemate was automatically nominated for eviction for violating the Big Brother rules.
This housemate received one nomination point for their-self.
Nominations
The first housemate in each box was nominated for two points, and the second housemate was nominated for one point.; Extra nomination votes are in Italic.; Nominations undisclosed in the TV show are represented by "N/A".; TV4 uploaded a video of the distribution of nominations every week on TV4 Play (Only available in Sweden).

	Week 9	Week 10			Week 11		Week 12	Week 13				Week 14				
	Week 9	Nominations		Tie-breaker	Nominations	Tie-breaker	Week 12	Disadvantage vote		Nominations		Day 92	Day 93	Day 95	Final	
Tanja	Nardos; N/A	Nardos; Emelie		—N/a	Emelie; Adrian	Not; Eligible	Adrian; Madelene	Nardos	Nardos	Emelie; Nardos		No; Nominations	No; Nominations	No; Nominations	Winner (Day 99)	
Nardos	Dennis; Tanja	+1	Dennis; Madelene	Pedram	Tanja; Dennis	Adrian	2-Tanja; 1-Judith; 1-Judith	Madelene	Madelene	Madelene; Tanja		No; Nominations	No; Nominations	No; Nominations	Runner-up (Day 99)	
Emelie	Tanja; 2-Tanja; 1-N/A	Pedram; Tanja		Pedram	Pedram; Adrian	Not; Eligible	Adrian; Pedram	Pedram	Pedram	Pedram; Tanja		No; Nominations	No; Nominations	No; Nominations	Third place (Day 99)	
Simon	Jaqueline; Dennis	Mergim; Dennis		Madelene	2-Adrian; 1-Dennis; 1-Dennis	Not; Eligible	Madelene; Adrian	Madelene	Madelene	2-Emelie; 1-Madelene; 1-Madelene		No; Nominations	No; Nominations	No; Nominations	Evicted (Day 97)	
Madelene	Dennis; N/A	Dennis; Pedram		—N/a	Pedram; Dennis	Pedram	Pedram; Simon	Pedram	Pedram	+1	Pedram; Simon	No; Nominations	No; Nominations	Evicted (Day 94)		
Judith	Jaqueline; Madelene	Dennis; Joel		Madelene	Dennis; Adrian	Adrian	Adrian; Madelene	Nardos	Nardos	Madelene; Nardos		No; Nominations	Evicted (Day 93)			
Pedram	Jaqueline; N/A	Emelie; Madelene		—N/a	Emelie; Dennis	Not; Eligible	Simon; Madelene	Emelie	Madelene	Emelie; Madelene		Evicted (Day 92)				
Adrian	Jaqueline; N/A	2-Simon; 1-Emelie; 1-Emelie		Simon	2-Emelie; 2-Dennis	Not; Eligible	Judith; Simon	Evicted (Day 85)								
Dennis	Tanja; 2-Jaqueline; 1-Simon	Mergim; Simon		Nardos	Pedram; Adrian	Not; Eligible	Evicted (Day 78)									
Joel	Jaqueline; N/A	Dennis; Mergim		Pedram	Walked (Day 73)											
Mergim	Dennis; Madelene	Dennis; Madelene		—N/a	Evicted (Day 71)											
Jaqueline	Dennis; N/A	Evicted (Day 64)														
Stephanie	Evicted (Day 57)															
Julia	Walked (Day 55)															
Notes	47, 48, 49	50, 51		52	53, 54, 55, 56	57	58, 59	60				61			62	
Sources				none		none		none				none				
Nomination power	Dennis; Emelie	Adrian		none	Adrian; Simon	none	Nardos	none		Simon		none				
Immunity winner	Pedram	Adrian			Madelene; Pedram; Tanja; Simon		~~Adrian~~; Nardos	none		none						
Against public vote	Dennis; Jaqueline; Madelene; Tanja	Dennis; Emelie; Mergim		Madelene; Pedram	Adrian; Dennis; Emelie		Adrian; Madelene; Judith; Simon	none		Emelie; Madelene; Pedram		All; Housemates				
Against public vote	Dennis; Jaqueline; Madelene; Tanja	Dennis; Emelie; Mergim		Dennis; Emelie; Mergim; Pedram	Adrian; Dennis; Emelie		Adrian; Madelene; Judith; Simon	none		Emelie; Madelene; Pedram		All; Housemates				
Walked	none				Joel	none										
Evicted	Jaqueline; Fewest votes to save	none		Pedram; Fewest votes to save	none	Dennis; Fewest votes to save	Adrian; Fewest votes to save	none		Pedram; Fewest votes to save		Judith; Fewest votes to save	Madelene; Fewest votes to save	Simon; Fewest votes to save	Emelie; Fewest votes to win	Nardos; Fewest votes to win
Evicted	Jaqueline; Fewest votes to save	none		Mergim; Fewest votes to save	none	Dennis; Fewest votes to save	Adrian; Fewest votes to save	none		Pedram; Fewest votes to save		Judith; Fewest votes to save	Madelene; Fewest votes to save	Simon; Fewest votes to save	Tanja; Most votes to win	

==== Notes ====
Week 9

- ^Note 47: This week is the Time Machine Week. The housemates will move to different ages during the week. During the week, housemates had to compete for different benefits.
- ^Note 48: On Day 58, Emelie and Dennis won the ice melting competition and won an extra nomination jointly. They nominated Tanja (in italic).
- ^Note 49: Mergim was blocked from competing in the immunity competition by the choice of Pedram, Nardos, Simon, and Tanja. Pedram won the immunity competition and he was immune from nomination this week.

Week 10

- ^Note 50: On Day 65, Adrian won the competition by collecting the most number of balloons and he received an extra nomination point in the nomination. Nardos collected the least number of balloons and she received one nomination point for herself.
- ^Note 51: On Day 66, each housemate had to block one other housemate from competing in the immunity competition. Adrian blocked Simon, Madelene blocked Dennis, Pedram blocked Joel, Tanja blocked Nardos, Nardos blocked Dennis, Simon blocked Adrian, Dennis blocked Simon, Emelie blocked Adrian, Mergim blocked Dennis, Judith blocked Dennis, and Joel blocked Adrian. Dennis received the most votes, therefore, he was not able to compete in the immunity competition. Adrian won the immunity competition and he was immune from nomination this week.
- ^Note 52: Madelene, Nardos, Pedram, and Simon received the same number of nomination points. On Day 68, they were required to vote again. They were called one by one to the confession room to vote for the housemate who they wanted to leave; the person who received the most votes would be the fourth nominee. Because Madelene and Pedram both received the same number of votes, the fourth nominee would be decided by the viewers instead. The housemate who received the least save votes would be nominated. Madelene received more save votes than Pedram, therefore, Pedram became the fourth nominee, alongside Dennis, Emelie, and Mergim.

Week 11

- ^Note 53: The housemates were divided into two groups: Big Brothers and Little Brothers. The Little Brothers live inside Little BB, which is inside the task room. The Big Brothers decide the house rules and competitions, and their job is to keep track of the Little Brothers. Big Brothers: Simon, Madelene, Tanja, and Pedram. Little Brothers: Nardos, Adrian, Dennis, Joel, Judith, and Emelie. Adrian and Simon won one extra nomination each in this week's nomination (in italic).
- ^Note 54: On Day 73, Joel chose to leave the house for personal reasons.
- ^Note 55: On Day 73, the public has decided that only the Little Brothers were available to be nominated, therefore, the Big Brothers received immunity this week.
- ^Note 56: Simon was demoted to Little Brother because of his behavior on the night of Day 72.
- ^Note 57: Adrian and Pedram received the same number of points during the nomination. Therefore, three Little Brothers (Judith, Madelene, and Nardos) need to make a tough decision on who between the two would be nominated.

Week 12

- ^Note 58: Nardos won one extra nomination in this week's nomination (in italic).
- ^Note 59: Adrian and Nardos won the immunity competition, but since Adrian was blocked from winning immunity earlier in the day, only Nardos is safe.

Week 13

- ^Note 60: After Adrian's eviction, the housemates took part in a vote for a housemate to receive a one nomination point disadvantage. Since Madelene, Nardos, and Pedram all received the same number of votes, a second vote had to be held. Madelene received the most votes, therefore, she automatically received one nomination point.

Week 14

- ^Note 61: For the final week, there was an eviction before the finale on Days 93, 94, and 97. All housemates were nominated for eviction. In each of those evictions, the housemate who received the least votes would be evicted.
- ^Note 62: The public voted for their winner.
