= Big Brother (Swedish TV series) season 5 =

Big Brother
- Season 5
- Presented by: Gry Forsell
- No. of days: 106
- No. of housemates: 21
- Winner: Simon Danielsson
- Runner-up: Peter Orrmyr

Release
- Original network: TV11
- Original release: 19 February – 4 June 2011

Season chronology
- ← Previous; Season 4 Next → Season 6

Big Brother 2011 was the fifth season of the Swedish version of the reality show Big Brother. It was premièred on 20 February 2011, when 17 housemates were locked inside a house located in Årsta Partihallar outside Stockholm TV11 broadcasts program six nights a week. Highlights shows are broadcast from Monday to Friday 22:00-23:00. Weekly Finals are broadcast on Sunday 21:00-22:25. For a fee, the viewer could also follow the participants live on the Internet. Overall, participants were locked up for 106 days (15 weeks). On 26 January 2011, it was announced that Gry Forssell would be the host of the show.

The winner of the fifth Swedish Big Brother series receives a grand prize of 500,000 SEK.

== Format ==
Housemates are incarcerated in the Big Brother House with no contact to and from the outside world. Each week participants competed in various challenges, which they had to perform to make Big Brother satisfied. Housemates were instructed to nominate two fellow housemates for eviction each week. This compulsory vote was conducted in the privacy of "Bikten" (the Confession), and housemates were not allowed to discuss the nomination process or influence the nominations of others. The two that received the most nominations, viewers decided who they wanted to save, the housemate with the fewest votes was evicted. If one or more participants violated the Big Brother rules the week they were also up for the weekly eviction.

== Housemates ==
Name	Age	Hometown	Occupation
Annie Almén	27	Lidköping	Student/assistant
Christian Lundgren	24	Farsta	Electrician
Cilla Domstad	39	Gävle	Stand-up Comedian
Ebba Berglund	24	Malmö	Waitress
Gökhan "Gurkan" Gasi	26	Västerås	Unemployed
Jessica Karlén	22	Lund	Student
Katerina Kazelis	33	Malmö	Science teacher
Madelene Stigsjöö	25	Gothenburg	Student
Martin Granetoft	22	Hörby	Lifeguard/model
Niklas "Nicky" Frantassiev	20	Stockholm	Club organizer
Patrik Edvardsson	33	Kristianstad	IT technician
Peter Orrmyr	33	Gothenburg	Chef
Rickard Andersson	27	Malmö	DJ
Rodney Da Silva	23	Haninge	Salesperson
Roza Kahi	21	Kista	Nanny
Sanna Redsäter †	23	Floda	Dancer
Sara Jönsson	24	Malmö	Shop assistant/bartender
Simon Danielsson	29	Umeå	Carpenter
Sonia Kamau	22	Stockholm	Make up artist
Tobias Holm	30	Örebro	Self-employed betting journalist
Vanessa Lopez	27	Malmö	Model

During the season, either the viewers or the housemates will have the chance to vote in wild cards to the Big Brother house.

=== The Glass House ===
Between 19 February to 27 four so-called "Wild cards" competed in to be a housemate in the new Big Brother house. They were all staying in "the Glass House", located in Skärholmens centrum. Of the four who were in the house, viewers vote for two, a boy and a girl, who will be moving into the real Big Brother house, where they would become leaders in the house. The Glass House could only be followed by the program's website but was free to look at. The "wild cards" were (those marked in bold went in the real house):

- Jimmy Guliano, 30 år, Malmö
- **Gökhan "Gurkan" Gasi, 26 år, Västerås**
- **Roza Kahi, 22 år, Kista**
- Sophie Palmstierna, 26 år, Malmö

=== Hunk Eden ===
Henrik Ström, Martin Isberg, and Patrik Edvardsson were introduced one week after the show started. In the first weekly live show, it was announced that the viewers got the chance to again vote in one participant in the Big Brother house. The three guys, called "the hunks", went to Thailand taking on various challenges in hopes of winning the viewers' vote. Every day, they received a new assignment. For a few days before Day 15, you were also able to follow them all the time inside a part of the Big Brother house. These days, they were trained by Drill Sergeant Jimmy Guliano. On Day 15, Patrik Edvardsson was voted in by the public with 41.64% of 21,434 votes to become a new housemate.

=== The Oasis ===
On week 5, three girls, Marisol Egana, Madelene Stigsjöö, and Minela Grebenarevic moved into the Mission Room, now called The Oasis. The guys in the house decided which one of the three would move into the house. According to the Big Brother presenter, Gry Forsell, the winner of this mission would take the very last place in the house. On Day 33 the guys picked Madelene to be the new housemate.

== Nominations table ==
First nomination with 2 points and the second nomination with 1 point.

	Week 1	Week 2	Week 3	Week 4	Week 5	Week 6	Week 7	Week 8	Week 9	Week 10	Week 11	Week 12	Week 13	Week 14	Week 15	
Simon	? ?	Sanna, Annie	Sanna, Vanessa	Annie, Vanessa	Vanessa, Roza	Vanessa, Annie	Madelene, Annie	Annie, Madelene	Katerina, Sara	No; Nominations	Sara, Katerina	No; Nominations	Sara, Christian	No; Nominations	Winner (Day 106)	
Peter	Rickard ?	Katerina, Sanna	Sanna, Katerina	Nicky, Katerina	Vanessa, Roza	Patrik, Vanessa	Madelene, Patrik	Katerina, Madelene	Katerina, Madelene	No; Nominations	Katerina, Christian	No; Nominations	Christian, Katerina	No; Nominations	Runner-Up (Day 106)	
Martin	? ?	Sonia, Annie	Katerina, Nicky	Nicky, Annie	Vanessa, Roza	Vanessa, Annie	Rodney, Katerina	Katerina, Annie	Katerina, Rodney	No; Nominations	Katerina, Gurkan	Exempt	Katerina, Christian	Exempt	Third Place (Day 106)	
Katerina	Cilla ?	Sanna, Cilla	Vanessa, Peter	Vanessa, Martin	Vanessa, Patrik	Vanessa, Patrik	Rodney, Patrik	Peter, Martin	Peter, Martin	Madelene, Annie	Madelene, Sara	No; Nominations	Peter, Martin	No; Nominations	Evicted (Day 104)	
Sara	? ?	Katerina, Annie	Katerina, Annie	Katerina, Annie	Annie, Patrik	Patrik, Annie	Katerina, Annie	Katerina, Annie	Katerina, Christian	No; Nominations	Katerina, Gurkan	No; Nominations	Katerina, Christian	No; Nominations	Evicted (Day 101)	
Christian	Rickard ?	Sanna, Vanessa	Sanna, Vanessa	Patrik, Vanessa	Patrik, Vanessa	Patrik, Annie	Patrik, Martin	Martin, Annie	Madelene, Sara	No; Nominations	Martin, Peter	No; Nominations	Peter, Katerina	Evicted (Day 92)		
Madelene	Not in house				In the Oasis	Annie, Vanessa	Rodney, Annie	Annie, Katerina	Gurkan, Martin	No; Nominations	Martin, Peter	No; Nominations	Evicted (Day 85)			
Gurkan	In Glass house	Sanna, Nicky	Nicky, Peter	Nicky, Vanessa	Vanessa, Roza	Vanessa, Patrik	Patrik, Madelene	No; Nominations	Peter, Martin	No; Nominations	Katerina, Peter	Evicted (Day 78)				
Sonia	? ?	Katerina, Cilla	Katerina, Nicky	Nicky, Katerina	Rodney, Patrik	Patrik, Peter	Patrik; Rodney	Madelene, Gurkan	Madelene, Peter	No; Nominations	Evicted (Day 71)					
Rodney	Rickard ?	Sara, Sonia	Sara, Sonia	Sara, Nicky	Roza, Sara	Patrik, Sonia	Patrik, Sara	Martin, Katerina	Peter, Martin	Evicted (Day 64)						
Annie	? ?	Katerina, Sara	Peter, Katerina	Peter, Sara	Peter, Sara	Sara, Martin	Rodney, Patrik	Madelene, Gurkan	Evicted (Day 57)							
Patrik	Not in house	In Hunk; Eden	Nicky, Katerina	Nicky, Katerina	Vanessa, Sonia	Vanessa, Gurkan	Rodney, Gurkan	Evicted (Day 50)								
Vanessa	Sanna ?	Katerina, Cilla	Katerina, Nicky	Katerina, Nicky	Gurkan, Patrik	Patrik, Gurkan	Evicted (Day 43)									
Roza	In Glass house	Sanna, Katerina	Katerina, Peter	Katerina, Nicky	Vanessa, Rodney	Evicted (Day 36)										
Nicky	Cilla ?	Sanna, Cilla	Vanessa, Annie	Patrik, Rodney	Evicted (Day 29)											
Sanna	Rickard ?	Katerina, Sara	Peter, Nicky	Evicted (Day 22)												
Tobias	Rickard ?	Katerina, Sanna	Walked (Day 16)													
Cilla	Katerina ?	Katerina, Annie	Evicted (Day 15)													
Jessica	? ?	Ejected (Day 10)														
Ebba	? ?	Walked (Day 7)														
Rickard	Christian ?	Ejected (Day 7)														
Against public vote	Katerina, Rickard	Cilla, Katerina, Sanna	Katerina, Nicky, Sanna	Katerina, Nicky	Roza, Vanessa	Patrik, Rodney, Vanessa	Katerina, Patrick	Annie, Katerina, Madelene	Katerina, Madelene, Rodney	All housemates	Gurkan, Katerina, Peter	Christian, Katerina, Madelene, Peter, Sara, Simon	Katerina, Gurkan	Katerina, Peter, Sara, Simon	Peter, Martin, Simon	
Walked	Ebba	none	Tobias	none												
Ejected	Rickard	Jessica	none													
Evicted	Eviction cancelled	Cilla; Fewest votes to save	Sanna; Fewest votes to save	Nicky; Fewest votes to save	Roza; Fewest votes to save	Vanessa; Fewest votes to save	Patrik; Fewest votes to save	Annie; Fewest votes to save	Rodney*; 28.19% to save	Sonia; Fewest votes to save	Gurkan; Fewest votes to save	Madelene; Fewest votes to save	Christian; Fewest votes to save	Katerina; Fewest votes to save	Martin; Fewest votes (out of 3)	Peter; Fewest votes (out of 2)
Evicted	Eviction cancelled	Cilla; Fewest votes to save	Sanna; Fewest votes to save	Nicky; Fewest votes to save	Roza; Fewest votes to save	Vanessa; Fewest votes to save	Patrik; Fewest votes to save	Annie; Fewest votes to save	Rodney*; 28.19% to save	Sonia; Fewest votes to save	Gurkan; Fewest votes to save	Madelene; Fewest votes to save	Christian; Fewest votes to save	Sara; Fewest votes to save	Simon; Most votes to win	

- Rodney was evicted with 28.19% and 6.289 votes. Madelene was saved with 6.290 votes and finally, Katerina was saved with the most votes (43.61% and 9.725 votes).

== See also ==
- "Fest i hela huset"
