= Gualöv Church =

- Gualöv kyrka
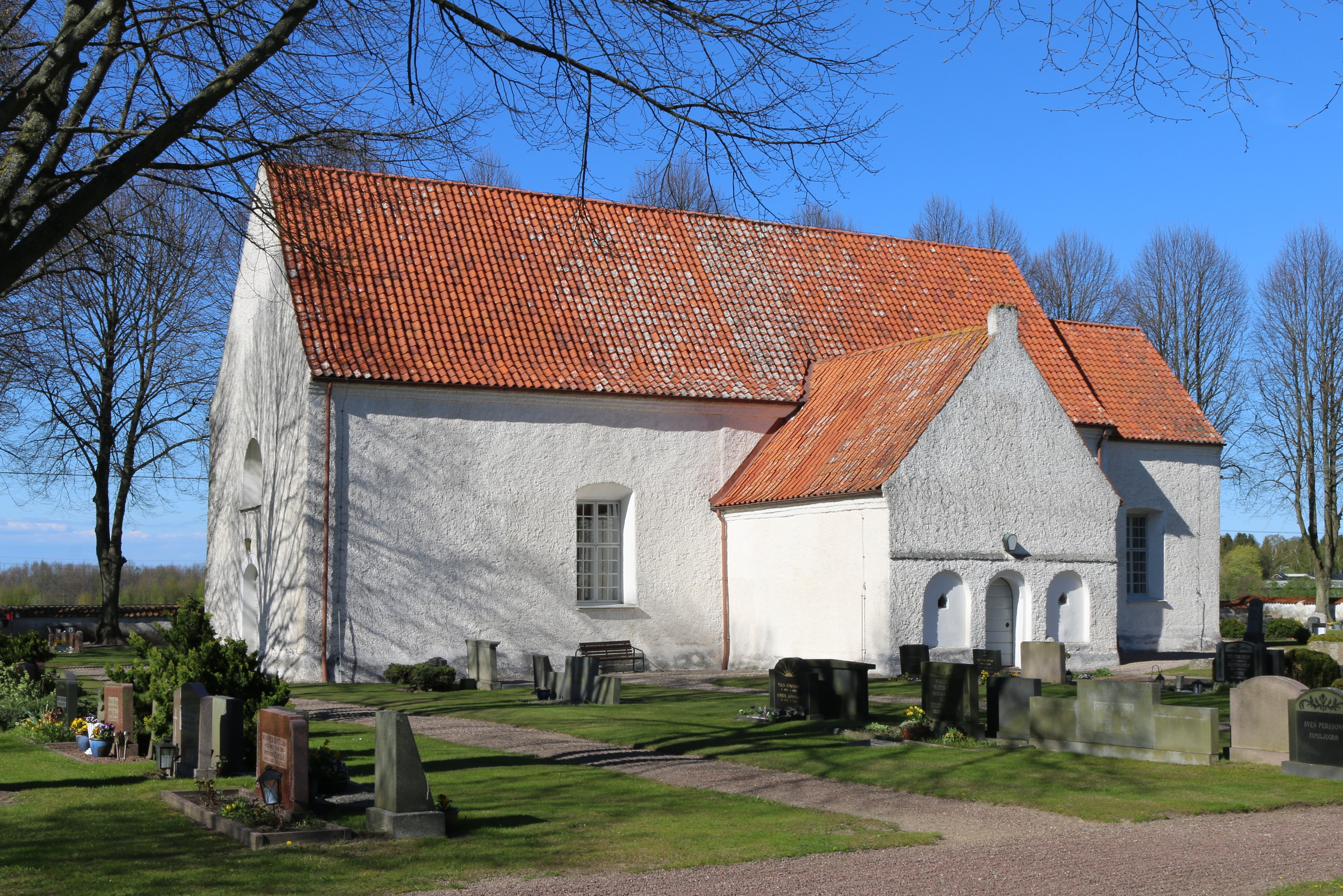
- Gualöv Church

- 56°02′53″N 14°24′29″E
- Country: Sweden
- Denomination: Church of Sweden

Gualöv Church (Swedish: Gualövs kyrka) is a medieval church in Gualöv, Bromölla Municipality, in the province of Skåne, Sweden. The church contains several medieval murals and a medieval altarpiece.

== History ==
Gualöv Church was built during the end of the 12th century. A church porch was built in the 14th century, and during the 15th century the earlier ceiling was replaced by the present vaults. The church bells are housed in a separate, wooden tower probably dating from the 18th century. Some alterations were made to the church in the 19th century.

== Murals ==
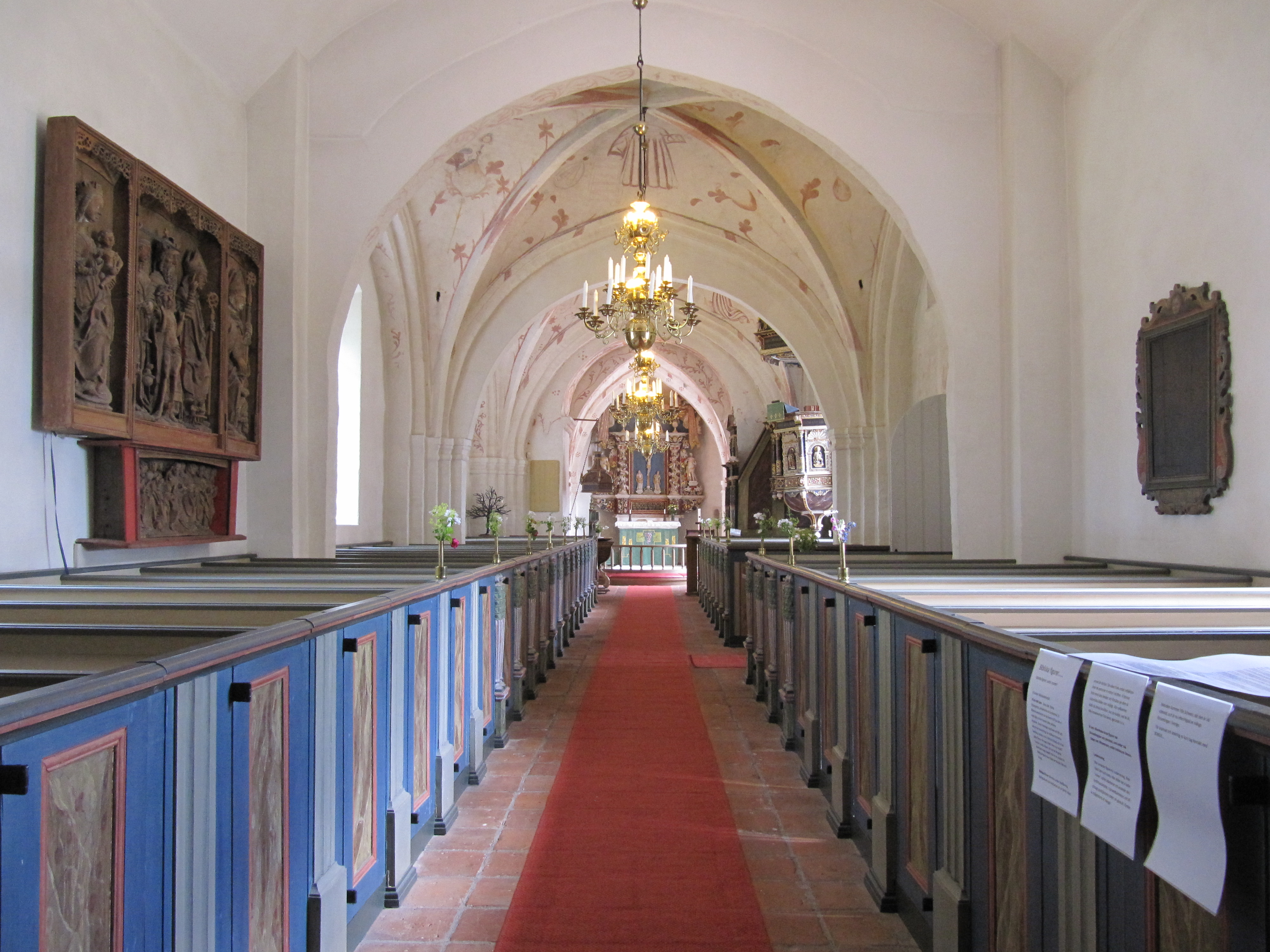
Gualöv Church, view of the interior

Gualöv Church contains medieval murals from two periods. The oldest are Romanesque in style and are located in the choir. They depict a knight and a woman, and an inscription in Latin stating that this is the portrait of Hugitus and his wife Hialmsvith, who ordered the decorating of the church. It has been suggested that the same couple probably ordered and financed the building of the church. In addition, the choir and nave also contain murals from the 1470s, depicting religious subjects such as the Last Judgment and the Nordic royal saints Olaf, Eric and Canute, but also e.g. the Wheel of Fortune. There are also fragments of decorative paintings in the church porch.

== Furnishings ==
The main altarpiece of the church is from 1704, but the church also contains an altarpiece from the 1510s, displayed on one of the nave walls. It was most likely made in northern Germany. The baptismal font and the pulpit both date from the 17th century.
