= Big Brother (Swedish TV series) season 8 =

Big Brother
- Season 8
- Presented by: Malin Stenbäck; Adrian Boberg (Premiere)
- No. of days: 99
- No. of housemates: 19
- Winner: Sami Jakobsson
- Runner-up: Lennie Hansson

Release
- Original network: TV4 (Premiere); Sjuan (Live shows; Daily shows); C More (Live); TV4 Play (Stream)
- Original release: 10 February – 18 May 2020

Season chronology
- ← Previous; Season 7 Next → Season 9

Big Brother Sverige 2020 is the eighth season of the Swedish Big Brother and the eleventh season of Big Brother overall to air in Sweden.

Big Brother celebrated its 20th anniversary and the show returned to Sweden after a five-year break. On 24 September 2019, TV4 announced that they will revive the show in early 2020. This season officially started on 10 February 2020 on TV4. Malin Stenbäck and Adrian Boberg co-hosted the show, Moa Wallin and Helle Schunnesson were the sidekicks of the live show. This season was planned to run for 100 days. The winner received 1,000,000 kr.

The weekly live shows were broadcast on Mondays on Sjuan, and daily shows were broadcast from Tuesdays to Sundays, also on Sjuan and TV4 Play. There were live streams with multiple camera angles on C More.

Adrian Boberg and Helle Schunnesson both quit hosting the live show after learning of housemate Sami Jakobsson's background with right-wing extremism and his having tattoos with Nazi symbols before.

Due to the COVID-19 pandemic in Sweden, no more housemates were allowed to enter the house later in the show.

== Production ==
=== Format change ===
The main format for this season has a big change with the cancellation of nomination. Instead, by setting a series of competitions each week and the losers will be nominated for eviction. After analyzing all the years of the reality show, it has been found that the format has led to people being broken down and that many of the participants mentally felt bad. TV4 decided to redo the show's original format.

TV4 writes in the press release that "Mental illness has been promoted by a game engine that focuses on hunting and conflict, rather than the social and psychological experiment that is the show's original idea."

The former premise has been to make it popular in the house to avoid getting the most number of nomination votes by the other participants. The participants have not been allowed to talk about their decisions in previous seasons, which TV4 believes has led to the fact that you can not trust anyone and that the participants have never been able to sort out any conflicts.

The press release states: "Not being able to talk about nominations means that you as a nominee live with the knowledge that the majority of participants may not like you or see you as a threat. If you are lucky and the viewers leave you there, you still need to be left with the feeling of insecurity and the feeling that may not be liked or be a big threat. It leads to confusion."

The show has removed the segment of nomination and the housemates will have the opportunity to talk to each other about their choices. But the production has also divided the season into the Qualifying Game and the Final Game.

In the Qualifying Game, both housemates and viewers have the opportunity to save one or more people in the house. Participants will also need to motivate their choices about why they want a person to stay or leave the house. Viewers also have the power to go against the participants and save the person.

When the Final Game starts, there will be no new housemates to enter the house. The competition momentum will remain during the final game, but the show will be more focused on nominations.

=== House ===
The house is built in Telestaden in Farsta, Stockholm. It's a colorful and luxurious house with more than fifty cameras and ninety microphones and it features a 400 m^{2} living area, a 75 m^{2} pool room, a spa with a whirlpool and a luxury bathroom, two bedrooms for at least 12 people. Housemates will have access to a fully equipped kitchen and gym.

== Housemates ==
Name	Age on entry	Hometown	Occupation	Day entered	Day exited	Status
Sami Jakobsson	25	Köping	Truck driver	1	99	Winner
Lennie Hansson	36	Sundsvall	Importer	6	99	Runner-up
Jasmine Armstrong	26	Halmstad / Gothenburg	Retail sales and substitute teacher	1	99	Third place
Mergim Feka	21	Hässleholm	Bartender and warehouse worker	1	96	Evicted
Frida Skoglund	29	Karlstad	Waiter and wine sommelier	29	92	Evicted
Julia Löfgren	29	Stockholm	Entrepreneur; Driver and nail salon owner	1	85	Evicted
Martin Forsten	30	Åkersberga	Carpenter	7	78	Evicted
Amilia Stapelfeldt	25	Stockholm	PR consultant and talent scout	1	71	Evicted
Alex Manzizila	31	Stockholm	Entrepreneur and substitute teacher	1	64	Evicted
Victoria Klöfver Rama	22	Östersund	Flight attendant	15	57	Evicted
Daniel Glasman	37	Stockholm	Communications strategist and nightclub employee	1	50	Evicted
Philip Wesselhoff	24	Gothenburg	Personal assistant	29	36	Evicted
Izabella Andersson Acimovic	26	Norrköping	Marketer; Former contestant of Parovi	26	32	Evicted
Lisa Eng	37	Stockholm	Teacher assistant	1	29	Evicted
Antonia "Anty" Johnson	28	Umeå	YouTuber and influencer	1	22	Evicted
Patrik Svensson	51	Gothenburg	Business manager and chef	1	20	Walked
Jessica Pamlin	23	Stockholm	YouTuber	5	8	Walked
Kim Kamal	21	Uppsala	Makeup artist; Hair stylist and influencer	1	4	Ejected
Isabel Pereira	24	Stockholm	Clothing store assistant	1	4	Ejected
Mole
Joakim Lundell	34	Vadstena	Artist and YouTuber	22	24	Left

== Game history & nominations table ==
Since there won't be nominations for the Qualifying Game Phase, a series of competitions would be held for each week. The losers would be in danger of possible eviction. For the Final Game Phase, the show switched back to the original format with housemates nominate each other. Housemates will compete in teams or individually for different benefits.

=== Qualifying Game Phase (Week 1 - Week 8) ===
This housemate won the weekly team competition and safe for the week.
This housemate was nominated for lost the weekly team competition.
This housemate was nominated for lost the weekly team competition, but was saved by winning the immunity competition.
This housemate was nominated for lost the weekly team competition, but was saved by the public vote.
This housemate was nominated for lost the weekly team competition, but was saved by housemate(s).
This housemate was nominated for lost the weekly team competition, but was saved by Friday's competition winner.

	Week 1	Week 2		Week 3	Week 4	Week 5		Week 6	Week 7		Week 8
	Week 1	Week 2		Week 3	Week 4	Day 32 Council vote	Day 36	Week 6	Week 7		Week 8
Nominated	Team competition										Individual
Nominated	Isabel; Kim; Jasmine; Sami	Alex; Daniel; Jasmine; Lisa; Mergim; Patrik		Amilia; Antonia; Lisa; Patrik	Alex; Daniel; Jasmine; Joakim; Lennie; Lisa; Mergim; Victoria	Alex; Daniel; Izabella; Jasmine; Lennie; Philip; Victoria	Alex; Izabella; Jasmine; Philip; Victoria	Alex; Amilia; Daniel; Jasmine; Julia; Lennie; Mergim	Jasmine; Lennie; Sami; Victoria		Alex; Amilia; Frida; Jasmine; Julia; Lennie; Martin; Mergim; Sami; Victoria
Saved by
Immunity competition	none	Mergim		Amilia	Daniel	Lennie		Amilia	Victoria		Lennie
Public vote	none	Daniel		none	Jasmine	none	Daniel; Jasmine	Jasmine; Lennie	Sami		Julia; Amilia; Mergim; Sami
Housemate(s)	none	Alex; Lisa		none	Alex	none	none	Alex	none		Frida; Martin
Friday's competition winner	none	Patrik by Mergim		none	Victoria by Martin	Alex by Martin		Mergim by Victoria	Jasmine by Martin		none
Sami	Lose	1	Win	Win	Win	Izabella	Safe	Win		Daniel	Saved
Lennie	Not in House	3	Win	Win	Lose	Daniel	Saved	Saved		Daniel	Frida to block
Jasmine	Lose	5	Lose	Win	Saved	Izabella	Saved	Saved		Julia	Victoria to block
Mergim	Win	5	Saved	Win	Saved by Lennie	Daniel	Safe	Saved		Daniel	Alex to block
Frida	Not in House					Izabella	Safe	Win		Julia	Mergim to block
Julia	Win	2	Win	Win	Win	Izabella	Safe	Win	LC	6 points	Saved
Martin	Not in House	2	Win	Win	Win	Izabella	Safe	Win		Julia	Saved
Amilia	Win	1	Win	Saved	Win	Daniel	Safe	Saved		Daniel	Jasmine to block
Alex	Win	4	Saved	Win	Saved	Izabella	Saved	Saved		Julia	Amilia to block
Victoria	Not in House			Win	Saved	Izabella	Lose	Win		Daniel	Sami to block
Daniel	Win	6	Saved	Win	Saved	Izabella	Saved	Lose	LC	5 points	Evicted (Day 50)
Philip	Not in House					Izabella	Lose	Evicted (Day 36)			
Izabella	Not in House					Daniel	Evicted (Day 32)				
Lisa	Win	4	Saved	Lose	Lose	Evicted (Day 29)					
Joakim	Not in House				Lose	Left (Day 24)					
Antonia	Win	3	Win	Lose	Evicted (Day 22)						
Patrik	Win	6	Saved	Lose	Walked (Day 20)						
Jessica	Not in House	Walked (Day 8)									
Kim	Lose	Ejected (Day 4)									
Isabel	Lose	Ejected (Day 4)									
Notes	1, 2, 3, 4	5, 6, 7, 8, 9		10, 11, 12, 13	14, 15, 16, 17, 18, 19	20, 21, 22	20, 23, 24	25, 26, 27, 28, 29, 30	31, 32, 33, 34, 35		36, 37, 38, 39, 40, 41
Against public vote (for eviction)	none	Jasmine		Antonia; Lisa	Lennie; Lisa	Daniel; Izabella	Philip; Victoria	Daniel; Julia	Daniel; Lennie		Alex; Jasmine; Mergim; Sami; Victoria
Against public vote (for eviction)	none	Jasmine		Antonia; Lisa	Lennie; Lisa	Daniel; Izabella	Philip; Victoria	Daniel; Julia	Daniel; Lennie		Alex; Jasmine; Victoria
Left	none				Joakim	none					
Walked	Jessica	none		Patrik	none						
Ejected	Isabel; Kim	none									
Evicted	No; Eviction	Jasmine; 71.8% to save		Antonia; Fewest votes to save	Lisa; Fewest votes to save	Izabella; Fewest votes to save	Philip; Fewest votes to save	Daniel; Julia; 50.5% to save	Daniel; Fewest votes to save		Mergim; Sami; Most votes (out of 5) to save
Evicted	No; Eviction	Jasmine; 71.8% to save		Antonia; Fewest votes to save	Lisa; Fewest votes to save	Izabella; Fewest votes to save	Philip; Fewest votes to save	Daniel; Julia; 50.5% to save	Daniel; Fewest votes to save		Victoria; Fewest votes to save

==== Notes ====
Week 1

- ^Note 1: Isabel, Kim, Jasmine and Sami were nominated for losing a series of competitions.
- ^Note 2: On Day 4, Isabel was ejected from the Big Brother house for unacceptable behaviour and breaking the rules during a conversation between her and Kim. Later Kim was also ejected for the same reason.
- ^Note 3: On Day 8, Jessica voluntarily left the show for personal reasons.
- ^Note 4: During Day 8's live show, Mergim was given the opportunity to save a housemate. He chose Jasmine. But later the host revealed that both Jasmine and Sami were safe and there was no eviction on Day 8. However, Sami received a penalty and will be chained to another housemate.

Week 2

- ^Note 5: The second week was the Chain Week, housemates will be divided into two teams as usual on Tuesday. Besides, they will be chained in pairs. That means they have to do everything together. The pairs are: 1 Sami and Amilia, 2 Julia and Martin, 3 Antonia and Lennie, 4 Alex and Lisa, 5 Mergim and Jasmine, 6 Daniel and Patrik. Pairs in Yellow Team are: Amilia and Sami, Julia and Martin, Antonia and Lennie. Pairs in Pink Team are: Alex and Lisa, Mergim and Jasmine, Daniel and Patrik. The yellow team won and the pink team lose and thus nominated.
- ^Note 6: Alex, Daniel, Jasmine, Lisa, Mergim and Patrik were nominated for losing a series of competitions. Mergim won immunity competition on Day 10, therefore saved.
- ^Note 7: On Day 12, Daniel was saved by a public vote through the app.
- ^Note 8: On Day 13, Alex and Lisa were saved by housemates' decision.
- ^Note 9: During the live show, the winner of Friday's pedometer competition, Mergim, would save one of Patrik or Jasmine. Viewers then decide the unselected person should stay or leave. Mergim chose to save Patrik. Jasmine faced the public vote, and the viewers chose her to stay.

Week 3

- ^Note 10: The third week was Sports Week, housemates divided into three teams on Day 17. Housemates must melt ices with their bodies. Team Pink: Alex, Daniel, Jasmine and Lennie. Team Turquoise: Amilia, Antonia, Lisa and Patrik. Team Yellow: Martin, Mergim, Sami, Julia and Victoria. Julia has been infected by Bacillus so she couldn't compete, but she is still affected by how her team performs. Team Pink and Team Yellow won and Team Turquoise lost.
- ^Note 11: The viewers voted that Amilia and Sami would have the chance to win the Golden Ticket, the winner will be safe for the week. To win the Golden Ticket, Amilia and Sami needed to make the Big Brothers version of the Vasaloppet. For 24 hours, they would fence as far as they could from the distance between Sälen and Mora on a fencing machine. Finally, after Big Brother summed up and made a deduction for a rule violation, Sami won the Golden Ticket by just over a mile over Amilia.
- ^Note 12: Amilia won the immunity competition on Day 18.
- ^Note 13: Patrik left the house on Day 20 after a few days of illness.

Week 4

- ^Note 14: Week 4 is the Anniversary Week. Housemates celebrate the 20 years since Big Brother was launched for the first time in the world. During the week, we will revisit classic Big Brother themes known faces. For this week's team competition, housemates divided into three teams. Team Pink: Amilia, Julia, Martin, Sami. Team Turquoise: Alex, Jasmine, Lisa, Mergim. Team Yellow: Daniel, Joakim, Lennie, Victoria.
- ^Note 15: Joakim entered the house as a new housemate on Day 22 and on Day 23, he revealed to the viewers that he is a mole. As a mole in the house, Joakim was given a mission where he told the housemates that he and Jonna would divorce. After a vote in the app, he told the housemates that he found someone new now. He left the house on the morning of Day 24.
- ^Note 16: Lennie used the power he won last week to save one of the losers, he chose Mergim.
- ^Note 17: On Day 26, Jasmine was saved by a public vote.
- ^Note 18: On Day 27, Alex was saved by housemates' decision.
- ^Note 19: During the live show, the winner of Friday's pedometer competition, Martin, would save one of Lennie, Lisa or Victoria. Viewers then decide the unselected person should stay or leave. Martin chose to save Victoria. Lennie and Lisa faced the public vote, and Lisa was evicted for received the fewest votes.

Week 5

- ^Note 20: Week 5 is the Robinson Week. For this week's team competition, housemates divided into two camps. North: Alex, Glasman, Izabella, Jasmine, Lennie, Philip, Victoria. South: Amilia, Frida, Julia, Martin, Mergim, Sami. South team won.
- ^Note 21: Lennie won the immunity challenge, therefore safe for the week.
- ^Note 22: On Day 32, housemates had the opportunity to vote on one of Alex, Daniel, Izabella, Jasmine, Philip and Victoria they want to send home on the Council. Daniel and Izabella have received the most votes during the Council. Then it was up to the viewers to decide who should leave on the same day. After the voting, it was revealed that Izabella was evicted and Daniel therefore safe for the week.
- ^Note 23: On Day 34, Jasmine was saved by a public vote.
- ^Note 24: During the live show, the winner of Friday's competition, Martin, would save one of Alex, Philip or Victoria. Viewers then decide the unselected person should stay or leave. Martin chose to save Alex. Philip and Victoria faced the public vote, and Philip was evicted for received the fewest votes.

Week 6

- ^Note 25: Week 6 is the "In the service of the community" Week. This week the house is divided into three groups that serve the community - the viewers. During the week the groups will be faced with challenges and competitions. Housemates will also work in community service by giving the viewers the chance to request a service from one of the housemates. The three groups are: Svensson: Frida, Martin, Sami and Victoria. Workers: Jasmine, Julia, Lennie and Mergim. Snobs: Alex, Amilia and Daniel. Svensson won the team competition.
- ^Note 26: Amilia won the immunity challenge, therefore safe for the week.
- ^Note 27: Jasmine was saved by a public vote.
- ^Note 28: Alex was saved by housemates' decision.
- ^Note 29: Jasmine was saved by a public vote.
- ^Note 30: During the live show on 23 March, the winner of Friday's competition, Victoria, would save one of Daniel, Julia and Mergim. Victoria chose to save Mergim. However, on 22 March, there was a vote on the app, viewers were given the opportunity to choose "Yes" or "No" on the vote "Should all of three housemates be rescued". It was revealed on the live show that 50.5% of votes chosen "Yes", which means Daniel and Julia are both safe from the eviction.

Week 7

- ^Note 31: Week 7 is the Health Week. This week the house is divided into two groups. Pink Team: Alex, Amilia, Frida, Martin and Mergim. Yellow Team: Jasmine, Lennie, Sami and Victoria. Julia and Daniel who were losers last week are not part of any team, but they will meet in a duel on Wednesday. Yellow Team won and Pink Team lost.
- ^Note 32: Victoria won the immunity challenge, therefore safe for the week.
- ^Note 33: Sami was saved by a public vote.
- ^Note 34: LC Daniel and Julia competed in a Lucky Coach vote, Daniel received 5 points from housemates, Julia received 4 points from housemates. After the public vote, which worth 2 points, Julia received total 6 points, therefore won and safe for this week.
- ^Note 35: During the live show on 30 March, the winner of Friday's competition, Martin, would save one of Daniel, Jasmine and Julia. Martin chose to save Jasmine. On 29 March, there was a vote on the app, viewers were given the opportunity to vote on "Should one housemate go home as usual or all of the housemates will be saved". It was revealed on the live show that 51.2% of votes chosen to evict one housemate as usual. Daniel was evicted later.

Week 8

- ^Note 36: Lennie won the first competition of the "Horror Week", therefore safe for the week.
- ^Note 37: Housemates walked one by one into the mission room, in front of them, there was a black wall with photos of the nominees and a bucket of red paint. They had to choose a housemate who they wanted to block from immunity and not be able to sit safely this week and paint a cross over their picture. Then the blocked person went in and to block the next person. When there were only two people left, it was up to the viewers to vote for the one they are wanted to get immunity for the week. The vote was between Julia and Martin and after the vote it was clear that the viewers voted for Julia. She is immuned and safe of the week with Lennie, who won this week's Horror competition.
- ^Note 38: Lennie and Julia were given the task of selecting four housemates who would have the chance to be safe for the week. They chose Frida, Martin, Alex and Amilia. Then the viewers got to vote on who they prefer to be safe. After a two-hour vote in the TV4 Play and C More app, it was clear that the viewers chose Amilia. Lennie, Julia and Amilia were then forced to save one of the three that the viewers did not save. After a brief discussion, they chose to save Frida.
- ^Note 39: Frida, Lennie, Julia and Amilia competed for the power to rescue a friend during Friday's afternoon.
- ^Note 40: Frida won the power competition and was immuned, but she also asked to rescue one of the nominated housemates. She chose to rescue Martin.
- ^Note 41: Alex, Jasmine, Mergim, Sami and Victoria were nominated. The two with the most votes will be rescued and the other three will continue to be nominated. Then a new vote starts between the three who were nominated. One housemate will leave the house.

=== Final Game Phase (Week 9 - Week 14) ===
This housemate won the immunity competition.
This housemate was automatically nominated for eviction for violating the Big Brother rules.
Nominations: The first housemate in each box was nominated for two points, and the second housemate was nominated for one point.

	Week 9	Week 10	Week 11	Week 12	Week 13	Week 14		
	Week 9	Week 10	Week 11	Week 12	Week 13	Day 95	Final	
Sami	Jasmine; Amilia	3-Amilia; 1-Mergim	Julia; Martin	2-Frida; 2-Mergim	Frida; Lennie	No; Nominations	Winner (Day 99)	
Lennie	Alex; Julia	Julia; Sami	Mergim; Frida	Julia; Sami	Jasmine; Sami	No; Nominations	Runner-up (Day 99)	
Jasmine	Julia; Amilia	Amilia; Mergim	2-Julia; 2-Martin	Frida; Mergim	Frida; Lennie	No; Nominations	Third place (Day 99)	
Mergim	Alex; Jasmine	Julia; Sami	Lennie; Frida	Julia; Jasmine	3-Sami; 1-Jasmine	No; Nominations	Evicted (Day 96)	
Frida	Alex; Jasmine	Amilia; Mergim	Mergim; Lennie	Julia; Sami	Jasmine; Sami	Evicted (Day 92)		
Julia	Jasmine; Frida	Amilia; Mergim	Sami; Jasmine	Frida; Mergim	Evicted (Day 85)			
Martin	Julia; Amilia	Amilia; Mergim	Jasmine; Sami	Evicted (Day 78)				
Amilia	Alex; Jasmine	Julia; Sami	Evicted (Day 71)					
Alex	Amilia; Julia	Evicted (Day 64)						
Victoria	Evicted (Day 57)							
Notes	42, 43	44, 45, 46, 47, 48, 49	50, 51, 52	53, 54	55, 56	57	58	
Against public vote	Alex; Jasmine; Julia	Amilia; Jasmine; Julia; Martin; Mergim	Frida; Jasmine; Lennie; Martin; ~~Sami~~	Frida; Julia; Mergim	Frida; Jasmine; Sami	All; Housemates		
Evicted	Alex; Most votes to evict	Amilia; Most votes to evict	Martin; Most votes to evict	Julia; Most votes to evict	Frida; Most votes to evict	Mergim; Fewest votes to save	Jasmine; Fewest votes to win	Lennie; Fewest votes to win
Evicted	Alex; Most votes to evict	Amilia; Most votes to evict	Martin; Most votes to evict	Julia; Most votes to evict	Frida; Most votes to evict	Mergim; Fewest votes to save	Sami; Most votes to win	

==== Notes ====
Week 9

- ^Note 42: Week 9 is the Easter Week. Housemates divided into three teams. Team Pink: Amilia, Julia and Mergim. Team Turquoise: Lennie, Frida and Martin. Team Yellow: Alex, Jasmine and Sami. The Pink Team won the prize competition and won an extra nomination vote which they can jointly nominate a housemate on the nomination day.
- ^Note 43: Lennie, Martin and Sami were able to compete in the immunity competition after won a qualifying competition for this immunity competition. Martin was won and immuned for this week's nomination.

Week 10

- ^Note 44: Week 10 is the Adults and Children Week. Housemates divided into two teams. Adults: Amilia, Julia, Mergim and Sami. Children: Frida, Lennie, Jasmine and Martin.
- ^Note 45: Sami won the tournament and reward an extra nomination point.
- ^Note 46: Martin and Jasmine were automatically nominated and lost their right to compete in the immunity competition as a punishment for breaking the rules for talking about nominations.
- ^Note 47: On Wednesday, viewers got to vote on which housemate is the most childish adult. The viewers chose Amilia and then she became a child. Thus, only Julia, Mergim and Sami are adults.
- ^Note 48: Frida won the immunity competition and immuned for this week's nomination.
- ^Note 49: Four children competed for the chance to become an adult. Amilia, Frida, Jasmine and Lennie competed in a competition. Amilia and Lennie finally became adults, Frida and Jasmine lost the duels and remain in the children's room until further notice.

Week 11

- ^Note 50: Week 11 is the Love Week. All housemates were nominated, and on Thursday, housemates will save one housemate of their favorite. On Tuesday, Housemates competed in a competition individually to win extra nomination points. Finally, Jasmine won the Love Box and was awarded an extra nomination point in the upcoming nomination.
- ^Note 51: This week, all housemates nominated and the nominations were not to evict, instead, the housemates have to choose two housemate they would like to save from eviction in an open nomination. Julia Löfgren and Mergim Feka received the most nominations with four points each were safe from this week's eviction.
- ^Note 52: Sami was saved by the viewers therefore safe for the week with Julia and Mergim.

Week 12

- ^Note 53: Week 12 is the Festival Week. Sami won the midsummer game competition and was awarded an extra nomination vote in the upcoming nomination.
- ^Note 54: Julia won an extra nomination point in the upcoming nomination.

Week 13

- ^Note 55: Week 13 is the Super Hero Week. Mergim won the prize competition and was awarded an extra nomination point in the upcoming nomination.
- ^Note 56: Mergim won another prize competition where the prize was to choose a housemate to not allow him/her to use nomination points on him. He chose Jasmine.

Week 14

- ^Note 57: A few days before the finale, the public voted for the housemate they want to stay and want to see in the finale. Mergim was evicted.
- ^Note 58: The public was voted for their winner.
