= Big Brother (Swedish TV series) season 6 =

Big Brother
- Season 6
- Presented by: Gry Forsell
- No. of days: 106
- No. of housemates: 22
- Winner: Hanna Johansson
- Runner-up: Amandus Allstadius

Release
- Original network: TV11
- Original release: 19 February – 3 June 2012

Season chronology
- ← Previous; Season 5 Next → Season 7

Big Brother 2012 is the sixth season of the Swedish version of the reality television series, Big Brother. This season was launched on Sunday 19 February 2012, and aired on TV11 for 106 days with the finale held on 3 June 2012. The same host from last season, Gry Forssell, returned as host to this season. The season was won by the 29-year-old mother of two Hanna Johansson.

== Housemates ==
=== The Loft ===
One day before the launch day, four potential housemates moved into a separate small house located directly on top of the House's roof called 'The Loft', where they stayed for four days while viewers could vote online of who among those four people would later move into the House and become a real housemate. The Loft consisted of Alexander "Acke" Pettersson, Jackie Ingevald, Joe Rovik and Ludvig Lannerås. After the four days spent inside the Loft, the voting closed and revealed Joe Rovik as the winner of the voting, and he moved into the House on Day 4.

=== Housemates ===
On Day 1, twelve of the original housemates entered the House, while three housemates (Kija, Hanna J, Juliana) entered the House during Days 2–4. One additional housemate (Joe) arrived in the House on Day 4, and another one (Marcelo) entered the House during the evening of Day 5. The next housemate (Lars) entered the House on the morning of Day 6. After Hannah W's departure, Rodney (from the previous season) entered the House on Day 22 and became a full housemate after the viewers took part in a vote to decide if he would stay or leave the next day, on Day 23. On the fifth live eviction night on Day 36, three new housemates (Jennifer, Vobban and Hulda) entered the House.

Name	Age	Hometown
Amandus Allstadius	22	Gnesta
Annica Englund	21	Östersund
Camilla Jacobsen	26	Stockholm / Dubai
Hanna Johansson	29	Filipstad
Hanna Rosenberg	22	Stockholm
Hannah Widerstedt	20	Vallentuna / London
Hanna "Hulda" Pettersson	22	Gävle
Jennifer Andreasson	22	Stockholm
Jessica Rasmussen	36	Malmö
Jimmy Österling	32	Höllviken
Joe Rovik	24	Karesuando
Juliana Ssempala	23	Stockholm
Kija Habibzadeh	30	Malmö
Lars Bergström	33	Umeå
Marcel Söderqvist	23	Sundbyberg
Marcelo Peña	21	Stockholm
Nadia Lindén	30	Hudiksvall
Petronella Persson	23	Gothenburg
Rodney Da Silva	24	Stockholm
Sipan Cakir	23	Örebro
Tenny Engdahl	36	Ekeby
Robert "Vobban" Jonsson	33	Sundsvall

== Nominations table ==
	Week 1	Week 2	Week 3	Week 4	Week 5	Week 6	Week 7	Week 8	Week 9	Week 10	Week 11	Week 12	Week 13	Week 14	Week 15	
Hanna J.	No nominations	—	—	No nominations	Rodney, N/A	No nominations	Rodney, N/A	—	Jennifer, Lars	Tenny, N/A	Jennifer, Vobban	N/A, Marcelo	Marcelo	No nominations	Winner (Day 106)	
Amandus	No nominations	Jessica, Lars	—	No nominations	Rodney, N/A	No nominations	Hulda, Tenny	Tenny, Joe	Annica, Tenny	Tenny, Rodney	Jennifer, Annica	Hanna J, Vobban	Marcelo	Exempt	Runner-Up (Day 106)	
Annica	No nominations	—	—	No nominations	Rodney, N/A	Kidnapped to Denmark	Hulda, N/A	Jennifer, N/A	—	Camilla, Hanna J	Jennifer, Vobban	Rodney, N/A	Camilla	No nominations	Third Place (Day 106)	
Marcelo	Exempt	—	—	No nominations	Hanna J, N/A	No nominations	—	—	Hulda, Amandus	N/A, Hanna J	Hanna J., Amandus	Hanna J, N/A	Nominated	No nominations	Evicted (Day 99)	
Lars	Exempt	—	—	No nominations	N/A, Joe	No nominations	Amandus, N/A	N/A	Hulda, Amandus	—	Hanna J., Amandus	Amandus, N/A	Camilla	No nominations	Evicted (Day 99)	
Camilla	No nominations	—	—	No nominations	—	No nominations	Tenny, N/A	—	Tenny, Rodney	Tenny, Rodney	Annica, Vobban	Vobban, Marcelo	Nominated	Evicted (Day 92)		
Rodney	Not in house			Exempt	Amandus, N/A	No nominations	—	Amandus, Joe	—	Camilla, Hanna J	Amandus, Annica	Amandus, N/A	—	Evicted (Day 92)		
Vobban	Not in house					Amandus, Jimmy	Rodney, N/A	N/A, Tenny	Hanna J, Hulda	Hanna J, N/A	Hanna J., Jennifer	—	Evicted (Day 85)			
Jennifer	Not in house					Amandus, Jimmy	Hanna J, N/A	—	Hanna J, Annica	—	Annica, Hanna J.	Evicted (Day 78)				
Tenny	No nominations	—	—	No nominations	—	No nominations	—	—	—	N/A, Jennifer	Evicted (Day 71)					
Hulda	Not in house					Amandus, Jimmy	Annica, N/A	—	—	Evicted (Day 64)						
Joe	No nominations	N/A, Hannah W.	—	No nominations	—	No nominations	—	Rodney, N/A	Evicted (Day 57)							
Marcel	No nominations	—	—	No nominations	N/A	No nominations	N/A, Amandus	Evicted (Day 50)								
Jimmy	No nominations	N/A	—	No nominations	—	No nominations	Evicted (Day 43)									
Hanna R.	No nominations	Jessica, N/A	—	No nominations	Hanna J, Amandus	Evicted (Day 36)										
Sipan	No nominations	N/A	N/A	No nominations	Ejected (Day 33)											
Kija	No nominations	N/A	—	No nominations	Evicted (Day 29)											
Hannah W.	No nominations	Hanna R, N/A	—	Walked (Day 22)												
Jessica	No nominations	Tenny, N/A	Evicted (Day 15)													
Petronella	No nominations	Walked (Day 8)														
Juliana	No nominations	Evicted (Day 8)														
Nadia	Walked (Day 2)															
Notes	[1]	[2]	[3], [4]	[5], [6], [7]	[8]	[9], [10]	[11]			[12]	[13]					
Against public vote	All housemates	Hannah W, Jessica, Sipan	Hanna J, ~~Hannah W~~, Kija, Sipan	Hanna J, Kija, ~~Marcelo~~, ~~Sipan~~	Hanna R, Marcel, Rodney	Amandus, Jimmy	Hulda, Jennifer, Marcel, Rodney	Amandus, Joe	Amandus, Hulda	Amandus, Hanna J, Tenny	Camilla, Hanna J, Jennifer	Camilla, Hanna J, Vobban	All housemates	Annica, Hanna J, Lars, Marcelo	Amandus, Annica, Hanna J.	
Walked	Nadia	Petronella	Hannah W.	none												
Ejected	none				Sipan	none										
Evicted	Juliana; Fewest votes to save	Jessica; Fewest votes to save	Eviction postponed	Kija; Fewest votes (out of 2)	Hanna R. Fewest votes to save	Jimmy; Fewest votes to save	Marcel; Fewest votes to save	Joe; Fewest votes to save	Hulda; Fewest votes to save	Tenny; Fewest votes to save	Jennifer; Fewest votes to save	Vobban; Fewest votes to save	Rodney; Fewest votes to save	Lars; Fewest votes to save	Annica; Fewest votes (out of 3)	Amandus; Fewest votes (out of 2)
Evicted	Juliana; Fewest votes to save	Jessica; Fewest votes to save	Eviction postponed	Kija; Fewest votes (out of 2)	Hanna R. Fewest votes to save	Jimmy; Fewest votes to save	Marcel; Fewest votes to save	Joe; Fewest votes to save	Hulda; Fewest votes to save	Tenny; Fewest votes to save	Jennifer; Fewest votes to save	Vobban; Fewest votes to save	Camilla; 2 of 4 votes to save	Marcelo; Fewest votes to save	Hanna J. Most votes to win	

Undisclosed Nominations are represented by "N/A"

- Granted immunity from eviction.
- Automatic nomination (due to violation(s) committed, failure of task etc.); see notes.
- ^[1] : All housemates were nominated by Big Brother for no apparent reason, although Lars and Marcelo escaped the nomination because they entered the House after the announcement was made.
- ^[2] : Sipan were automatically nominated for breaking the rules during that week's task.
- ^[3] : Sipan didn't successfully complete the test from Big Brother to avoid being automatically nominated again.
- ^[4] : There was no public vote this week, mainly because of the planned departure of Hannah W, and the reentry of Rodney from the last season.
- ^[5] : The nominations from Week 3 were brought over to Week 4's live eviction.
- ^[6] : Marcelo were automatically nominated for bad behaviour after Week 3's live eviction.
- ^[7] : Halfway through Week 4's live eviction night, Marcelo and Sipan got the highest votes and avoided being evicted.
- ^[8] : Sipan were ejected from the House after several weeks of breaking the rules. Hanna R. and Marcel were automatically nominated for the same reasons.
- ^[9] : Annica were kidnapped to the Danish Big Brother House as a result of the Housemates losing that week's task against the Danish housemates.
- ^[10] : The three new housemates (Hulda, Jennifer and Vobban) were the only ones nominating this week.
- ^[11] : Jennifer and Marcel got automatically nominated for bad behaviour and rule-breaking.
- ^[12] : Annica won that week's task and were granted immunity, but later also had to automatically nominate someone. She chose Amandus.
- ^[13] : Camilla was automatically nominated for discussing nominations.
