= Big Brother (Swedish TV series) =

Swedish TV series

- Big Brother logo from 2020 to 2021
- Also known as: Big Brother Sverige
- Genre: Reality
- Created by: John de Mol Jr.
- Presented by: Adam Alsing (2000; 2002–2004, 2015); Gry Forssell (2011–2012); Adrian Boberg (2020; Premiere); Malin Stenbäck (2020–2021); Arantxa Álvarez (2021)
- Country of origin: Sweden
- Original language: Swedish
- No. of seasons: 9
- No. of episodes: 913

Production
- Production companies: Meter Film & Television AB (2000; 2002–2004; 2015; 2020–2021); Endemol (2011–2012)

Original release
- Network: Kanal 5 (2000; 2002–2004); TV11 (2011–2012); Kanal 11 (2015); Sjuan (2020–2021)
- Release: 4 September 2000 – 24 May 2021

Big Brother or Big Brother Sverige was the Swedish version of the Big Brother reality television franchise, which was created by producer John de Mol Jr. and premiered in 2000. The show featured contestants who lived together in custom-built house and were isolated from the outside world. One person was evicted every week by public vote, with the last remaining housemate winning a cash prize.

The show aired on Kanal 5 from 2002–2004, on Kanal 11 from 2011–2015, and on Sjuan from 2020–2021. TV4 cancelled Big Brother Sverige on Christmas Eve in 2021 after 2 seasons, due to low ratings.

== Series overview ==
Season		Launch Date	Finale Date	Days	Housemates	Winner	Prize money	Presenter(s)	Network
1	Big Brother 2000	4 September 2000	15 December 2000	103	13	Angelica Freij	500,000 kr	Adam Alsing	Kanal 5
Big Brother Stjärnveckan		20 January 2002	25 January 2002	6	7	Anki Lundberg	none	Adam Alsing	Kanal 5
2	Big Brother 2002	26 January 2002	13 May 2002	108	15	Ulrica Andersson	500,000 kr	Adam Alsing	Kanal 5
3	Big Brother 2003	25 January 2003	11 May 2003	107	13	Danne Sörensen	500,000 kr	Adam Alsing	Kanal 5
4	Big Brother 2004	23 January 2004	10 May 2004	109	17	Carolina Gynning	500,000 kr	Adam Alsing	Kanal 5
5	Big Brother 2011	19 February 2011	4 June 2011	106	21	Simon Danielsson	500,000 kr	Gry Forsell	TV11
6	Big Brother 2012	19 February 2012	3 June 2012	106	22	Hanna Johansson	500,000 kr	Gry Forsell	TV11
7	Big Brother 2015	11 October 2015	20 December 2015	70	19	Christian Sahlström	1,000,000 kr	Adam Alsing	Kanal 11
8	Big Brother 2020	10 February 2020	18 May 2020	99	19	Sami Jakobsson	1,000,000 kr	Malin Stenbäck; Adrian Boberg (Note: Adrian Boberg only co-hosted the Premiere show with Malin Stenbäck.)	Sjuan (TV4)
9	Big Brother 2021	15 February 2021	24 May 2021	99	21	Tanja Helen Ingebretsen Kallin	1,000,000 kr	Malin Stenbäck (Note: Malin Stenbäck stopped hosting the live show after 18 March 2021, because her schedule collided with Big Brother.); Arantxa Alvarez	Sjuan (TV4)

== Big Brother 1 ==
The first season of Big Brother Sverige lasted for 103 days, starting on 4 September 2000 and ending on 15 December 2000.

Nine contestants entered the house on launch night. Daniel Hellström and Eva Pederson walked on day 3 and day 12, respectively. As a result, only seven housemates were eligible for the first nomination. Two replacements were added to the house before the first official eviction.

Two new housemates entered the house on Day 61. Only one of them was allowed to stay in the house as a replacement for Johan Hellström, who had voluntarily left. When the housemates voted for Christoffer Jensen to stay, he became the first contestant to replace two different housemates, as he had also been the replacement for Daniel Hellström earlier in the series. The Big Brother franchise saw its first double eviction with Camilla Björk and George Dieck leaving the house at the same time.

It was also the first time in Big Brother history that a replacement housemate made it to the final day (Jensen, who achieved third place) and most prominently, that Angelica Freij became the first woman worldwide to win the show.

The show received strong ratings. Per Holknekt, who finished fifth place, became a well-known fashion designer.

=== Nominations table ===
	#1	#2	#3	#4	#5	#6	#7	Final	
Angelica	?	?	?	?	?	?	Anna; Paula	Winner (Day 103)	
Paula	?	?	?	?	?	?	Angelica; Christoffer	Runner-Up (Day 103)	
Christoffer	?	?	Evicted (Day 35)		Nominated	?	Anna; Paula	Third Place (Day 103)	
Anna	?	?	?	?	?	?	Angelica; Christoffer	Evicted (Day 96)	
Per	?	?	?	?	?	?	Evicted (Day 82)		
George	Not in House				Nominated	Evicted (Day 68)			
Camilla	Not in House				Nominated	Evicted (Day 68)			
Ole	?	?	?	?	Evicted (Day 61)				
Johan	?	?	?	Walked (Day 60)					
Karin	?	?	?	Evicted (Day 47)					
Jessica	?	Evicted (Day 21)							
Eva	Walked (Day 12)								
Daniel	Walked (Day 3)								
Note	1, 2	none	none	none	3, 4	none	none	none	
Up for eviction	Anna; Jessica	Angelica; Christoffer	Johan; Karin	Angelica; Ole	Camilla; Christoffer; George	Angelica; Per	Angelica; Anna; Christoffer; Paula	Angelica; Christoffer; Paula	
Walked	Daniel; Eva	none		Johan	none				
Evicted	Jessica	Christoffer	Karin	Ole	Camilla	Per	Anna	Christoffer	Paula
Evicted	Jessica	Christoffer	Karin	Ole	George	Per	Anna	Angelica	

Notes:
- ^1: Daniel voluntarily leaves the House on Day 3. Christoffer enters as a replacement Housemate for Daniel.
- ^2: Eva voluntarily leaves the House in Week 2. Karin enters as a replacement Housemate for Daniel.
- ^3: Johan voluntarily leaves the House. Camilla and George enter the House. Christoffer re-enters the House. Only one of them will be able to stay as replacement for Johan.
- ^4: Camilla and George are evicted following a Housemate vote. Christoffer survives.

== Big Brother Stjärnveckan ==
After being off-air for more than a year, Big Brother Sverige returned with a spin-off called Big Brother Stjärnveckan (Week of the Stars) on 20 January 2002. It lasted for six days and became the shortest version of any Big Brother series worldwide. Seven former Swedish contestants from several reality shows lived together in the house with daily evictions. The show aired in the week before the start of the actual second season of Big Brother Sverige and was supposed to create excitement among the viewers.

The contestants that entered the house were Anki Lundberg from The Bar 3, Johan "Godzilla" Lennström and Anneli Nordin from Villa Medusa, Elizabeth "Lelle" Anderzén from Expedition Robinson 1998, Henric Olsson from The Bar 2, Robert "Robban" Andersson from Expedition Robinson 1999 and Karin Stor from the first Big Brother Sverige season.

Anki Lundberg won the show, on the same day that the second season began.

=== Nominations table ===
	Day 2	Day 3	Day 4	Day 5	Day 6 Final	
Anki	? ?	? ?	? ?	? ?	Winner (Day 6)	
Godzilla	? ?	? ?	? ?	? ?	Runner-up (Day 6)	
Robban	? ?	? ?	? ?	? ?	Third place (Day 6)	
Lelle	? ?	? ?	? ?	? ?	Evicted (Day 5)	
Anneli	? ?	? ?	? ?	Evicted (Day 4)		
Henric	? ?	? ?	Evicted (Day 3)			
Karin	? ?	Evicted (Day 2)				
Nominated	Henric; Karin	Anki; Henric	Anneli; Anki	Anki; Godzilla; Lelle; Robban	Anki; Godzilla; Robban	
Evicted	Karin	Henric	Anneli	Lelle	Godzilla	Robban
Evicted	Karin	Henric	Anneli	Lelle	Anki	

== Big Brother 2 ==
Season two of Big Brother Sverige started on 26 January 2002, exactly on the final day of Big Brother Stjärnveckan lasting for 108 days until 13 May 2002.

The season featured a three-way relationship between Dominique Pons, Emma-Maria Carlsson, and Kitty Jutbring. When Carlsson voluntary left the house and Pons was evicted, the focus turned to other showmances such as between Elin Nilsson and Jacob Heidrich.

Marie "Picasso" Pettersson replaced Carlsson. Sorani was originally evicted on Day 62 but was allowed a return a week later after several viewers were unable to vote in what has been a close vote between him and Heidrich. However, when Big Brother offered 50,000 kronor to the housemate that would walk, Sorani accepted the deal and left voluntarily.

For the third time in a row, the Swedish audience chose a woman to win their Big Brother season: Ulrica Andersson from Karlstad. The most notable housemate resulting from the season was Marie Picasso, who recorded two singles and became the host of a short-lived call-in show. In 2007, she auditioned for Sweden's local version of Pop Idol called Idol 2007 which she won resulting in a number-one single called This Moment.

=== Nominations table ===
	#1	#2	#3	#4	#5	#6	#7	#8	#9	Final	
Ulrica	Peter; Anette	Benjamin; Jacob	Benjamin; Peter	Jacob; Benjamin	? ?	Jacob; Benjamin	Jacob; Alex	Jacob; Alex	No; Nominations	Winner (Day 108)	
Alex	Anette; Peter	Kitty; Ulrica	Adriana; Kitty	Kitty; Ulrica	? ?	Marie; Ulrica	Kitty; Ulrica	Ulrica; Elin	No; Nominations	Runner up (Day 108)	
Jacob	Anette; Peter	Dominique; Kitty	Adriana; Peter	Peter; Elin	? ?	Peter; Marie	Kitty; Ulrica	Ulrica; Elin	No; Nominations	Third place (Day 108)	
Peter	Anette; Dominique	Adriana; Ulrica	Adriana; Ulrica	Elen; Dominique	? ?	Elin; Alex	Elin; Alex	Elin; Jacob	No; Nominations	Evicted (Day 104)	
Elin	Peter; Anette	Kalle; Dominique	Benjamin; Peter	Benjamin; Dominique	? ?	Marie; Benjamin	Peter; Alex	Peter; Alex	Evicted (Day 97)		
Kitty	Peter; Dominique	Kalle; Dominique	Benjamin; Dominique	Dominique; Benjamin	? ?	Benjamin; Jacob	Alex; Jacob	Evicted (Day 90)			
Benjamin	Adriana; Peter	Kitty; Ulrica	Kitty; Peter	Kitty; Ulrica	? ?	Ulrica; Kitty	Walked (Day 83)				
Marie	Not in House				Exempt	Ulrica; Kitty	Evicted (Day 76)				
Dominique	Anette; Adriana	Adriana; Ulrica	Adriana; Ulrica	Ulrica; Kitty	Evicted (Day 48)						
Adriana	Peter; Dominique	Dominique; Kitty	Dominique; Peter	Evicted (Day 34)							
Emma-Marie	Peter; Anette	Kalle; Ulrica	Peter; Benjamin	Walked (Day 32)							
Kalle	Anette; Peter	Kitty; Ulrica	Evicted (Day 20)								
Anette	Peter; Dominique	Evicted (Day 6)									
Notes	none				,	none		none		none	
Up for eviction	Anette; Peter	Dominique; Kalle; Kitty; Ulrica	Adriana; Banjamin; Peter	Benjamin; Dominique; Kitty; Ulrica	Benjamin; Jacob; Kitty; Ulrica	Marie; Ulrica	Alex; Kitty	Elin; Ulrica	All housemates	All housemates	
Walked	none		Emma-Marie	none			Benjamin	none			
Evicted	Anette	Kalle	Adriana	Dominique	Benjamin	Marie	Kitty	Elin	Peter	Jacob	Alex
Evicted	Anette	Kalle	Adriana	Dominique	Benjamin	Marie	Kitty	Elin	Peter	Ulrica	

Notes:
^1 Amelie, Lisa, and Marie were exempt from nominations and automatically nominated for eviction as they were new housemates. The two who received the most votes would be evicted.
^2 Due to technical problems with the fifth eviction, a number of viewers were unable to vote. As voting numbers between Benjamín and Jacob were close, it was decided to allow Benjamín to return.
^3 On day 83 Big brother made an offer to the seven remaining housemates. The offer was that if any housemate would leave the house they would receive 50,000 kronor, Benjamin accepted the offer.
^4The public were voting for a winner. Peter received the fewest votes and was evicted.

== Big Brother 3 ==
Season three of Big Brother Sverige started on 25 January 2003. It lasted for 107 days until 11 May 2003.

=== Nominations table ===
	#1	#2	#3	#4	#5	#6	#7	#8	Final	
Danne	Not in House		Marika; Lina	Caroline; Kajsa	Christian; Lina	Kajsa; Lina	Kajsa; Larssa	Kajsa; Larssa	Winner (Day 107)	
Kajsa	?	Malin; Lina	Marika; Linda	Linda; Lina	Linda; Lina	Linda; Lina	Linda; Micke	Micke; Danne	Runner up (Day 107)	
Larssa	?	Marika; Malin	Maricka; Christian	Caroline; Linda	Linda; Christian	Linda; Lina	Linda; Kajsa	Micke; Danne	Third place (Day 107)	
Micke	Not in House		Maricka; Christian	Caroline; Lina	Lina; Larssa	Lina; Kajsa	Kasja; Larssa	Larssa; Kasja	Evicted (Day 104)	
Linda	?	Malin; Mattias	Christian; Marika	Caroline; Mattias	Mattias; Kajsa	Lina; Kajsa	Kajsa; Larssa	Evicted (Day 90)		
Lina	?	Malin; Mattias	Micke; Christian	Caroline; Kajsa	Kajsa; Mattias	Kajsa; Larssa	Evicted (Day 76)			
Mattias	?	Malin; Marika	Marika; Linda	Linda; Micke	Linda; Lina	Walked (Day 63)				
Christian	?	Malin; Linda	Marika; Micke	Walked (Day 37)	Linda; Micke	Evicted (Day 62)				
Caroline	Not in House			Micke; Lina	Evicted (Day 48)					
Marika	Nominated	Mattias; Malin	Micke; Kajsa	Evicted (Day 34)						
Malin	?	Christian; Kajsa	Evicted (Day 20)							
Patrick	?	Walked (Day 9)								
Peter	Nominated	Evicted (Day 6)								
Notes		none		none		none		none		
Up for eviction	Marika; Peter	Malin; Mattias	Christian; Marika	Caroline; Linda	Christian; Lina; Linda; Mattias	Kajsa; Lina	Kajsa; Linda	Kajsa; Larssa; Micke	All housemates	
Walked	none	Patrick	none	Christian	none	Mattias	none			
Evicted	Peter	Malin	Marika	Caroline	Christian	Lina	Linda	Micke	Larssa	Kajsa
Evicted	Peter	Malin	Marika	Caroline	Christian	Lina	Linda	Micke	Danne	

Notes:
^1 In the first round of nominations the public voted for the housemates they wanted to be nominated. Since Marika and Peter received the most votes they were nominated for eviction and the housemates had to vote to evict one of them.
^2 Big brother awarded nomination points for rule breaking.
^3 Christian and Mattias were nominated by Big brother for rule breaking.
^4 Big Brother awarded Micke 4 points for rule breaking.

== Big Brother 4 ==
Season four of Big Brother Sverige started on 23 January 2004. It lasted for 109 days until 10 May 2004.

=== Nominations table ===
	#1	#2	#3	#4	#5	#6	#7	#8	Final	
Carolina	Jean; Ulrika	Olga; Ulrika	~~Stefan~~; ~~Ulrika~~	Ulrika; Rebekah; Henrik	Nominated	Stefan; Henrik	Heidi; Stefan	No; Nominations	Winner (Day 107)	
Stefan	Ulrika; Jean	Carolina; Marlene	~~Marlene~~; ~~Carolina~~	Carolina; Ulrika; Rebekah	Nominated	Carolina; Sirwan	Heidi; Carolina	No; Nominations	Runner up (Day 107)	
Caroline	Robin; Olga	Olga; Jocke	~~Carolina~~; ~~Marlene~~	Henrik; Carolina; Sirwan	Nominated	Sirwan; Henrik	Carolina; Heidi	No; Nominations	Third place (Day 107)	
Henrik	Not in House			Carolina; Sirwan; Olivier	Exempt	Henrik; Carolina	Heidi; Caroline	No; Nominations	Evicted (Day 105)	
Heidi	Not in House						Stefan; Henrik	Evicted (Day 98)		
Sirwan	Not in House			Olivier; Carolina; Ulrika	Nominated	Sirwan; Carolina	Evicted (Day 84)			
Christian	Not in House						Walked (Day 80)			
Olivier	Marlene; Ulrica	Carolina; Olga	~~Marlene~~; ~~Carolina~~	Ulrika; Rebekah; Carolina	Nominated	Walked (Day 75)				
Rebekah	Not in House			Carolina; Sirwan; Olivier	Nominated	Evicted (Day 70)				
Ulrika	Stefan; Carolina	Caroline; Angela	~~Carolina~~; ~~Marlene~~	Olivier; Carolina; Stefan	Evicted (Day 56)					
Marlene	Ulrika; Jean	Jocke; Jean	~~Stefan~~; ~~Ulrika~~	Evicted (Day 42)						
Angela	Robin; Olga	Marlene; Jean	Walked (Day 33)							
Foffo	Caroline; Angela	Marlene; Caroline	Walked (Day 33)							
Jocke	Caroline; Robin	Marlene; Olga	Walked (Day 32)							
Olga	Angela; Jocke	Caroline; Marlene	Ejected (Day 31)							
Jean	Marlene; Carolina	Marlene; Carolina	Evicted (Day 28)							
Robin	Olga; Jcoke	Evicted (Day 14)								
Notes	none									
Up for eviction	Robin; Ulrika	Carolina; Jean	Carolina; Caroline; Marlene; Olivier; Stefan; Ulrika	Carolina; Olivier; Ulrika	Carolina; Caroline; Olivier; Rebekah; Sirwan; Stefan	Sirwan; Henrik	Heidi; Stefan	All housemates		
Walked	none		Jocke; Angela; Foffo	none		Olivier; Christian	none			
Ejected	none		Olga	none						
Evicted	Robin	Jean	Marlene	Ulrika	Rebekah	Sirwan	Heidi	Henrik	Caroline	Stefan
Evicted	Robin	Jean	Marlene	Ulrika	Rebekah	Sirwan	Heidi	Henrik	Carolina	

Notes:
^1 Owing to rule breaking, Big brother gave Carolina two extra nomination points, Foffo, Olivier, and Stefan eight extra points and Jean ten extra points.
^2 The nominations were voided by Big Brother and all six housemates were put up for eviction.
^3 The three or more Housemates with the most points were up for eviction.
^4 Henrik won immunity from eviction, all other housemates were put up for eviction.
^5 In round six and seven of nominations only two Housemates could be up for eviction, so the housemate who received the most points could save one of the others.
^6 Two days before the final an eviction took place based on the number of votes to win housemates had received so far. Since Henrik received the fewest votes he was evicted.
