= Big Brother (Swedish TV series) season 7 =

Big Brother
- Season 7
- Presented by: Adam Alsing
- No. of days: 70
- No. of housemates: 19
- Winner: Christian Sahlström
- Runner-up: Puffen Gagnef

Release
- Original network: Kanal 11
- Original release: 15 October – 20 December 2015

Season chronology
- ← Previous; Season 6 Next → Season 8

Big Brother Maktspelet, also known as Big Brother 2015, is the tenth season of the Swedish Big Brother. Adam Alsing hosted the show. Ten players were selected out of a large group of candidates to meet the tough challenges and strategic power game.

This season started on 11 October 2015. It was the first Swedish Big Brother season to include new rules of Power player like in the British version. This was reported to be a short season with 70 days inside the house.

A Power Player was nominated every week - a title given to a player for a position of power, a possibility to control the game.

== Housemates ==
On Day 1, ten housemates entered the House. On Day 3, three more housemates entered. On Day 7, six more housemates entered.

Name	Age	Hometown
Alex Flores	26	Stockholm
Alexander Maxén	24	Gothenburg
Andreas Vedenqvist	23	Kristianstad
André Nordenberg	26	Västervik
Anna-Lisa Herascu	19	Olofström
Christian Sahlström	26	Stockholm
Deborah "Debbie" Grace	27	Karlstad
Elin Nilsson	23	Sundsvall
Isabella Kino	23	Helsingborg
Karin Ström	27	Stockholm
Lina Sjöberg	25	Gävle
Linnea Wall	24	Falkenberg
Myrna Österlund	27	Stockholm
Patricia Elmqvist	32	Malmö
Puffen Gagnef	32	Vestby, Norway
Sara Bolay	24	Gothenburg
Sasa Jensen	42	Stockholm
Sergio Benvindo	26	Västerås
Troy James	29	Stockholm

Andreas, Anna-Lisa and Sara are from the Swedish version of the British show Ex on the Beach Sverige.

=== Power Player ===
The Power Player is responsible for making important decisions in the house regarding nominations. The Power Player is immune from being nominated for the week they hold the title, but they can still nominate others.

- On Day 1, Lina was voted as the Power Player by the public just moments after entering the house. Her first big decision was to decide which housemate should be punished, and which should be rewarded based on first impressions. Respectively, she punished Patricia and rewarded Alex. On Day 2, she had to choose which of her housemates should be the first finalist from the season. She chose Christian.
- On Day 5, Lina chose Troy as the Power Player. He was told that he would have the power to choose two housemates to be evicted. He chose Alex and Karin on Day 6.

Colour key
Won the title of Power Player
Eligible to become Power Player
Not in the house at the time when the Power Player was decided
Was not eligible to become Power Player

Housemate	Day 1–5	Day 5–7	Day 7–14	Day 14–21	Day 21–28	Day 28–35	Day 35–42	Day 42–49	Day 49–56
Housemate	Public vote	Lina's choice	Pre-selected	Power Alliance	Public vote	House vote	Pre-selected	Power Couple	Pre-selected
Christian									
Puffen									
Isabella									
Patricia									
Sergio									
André									
Myrna									
Lina									
Anna-Lisa									
Sara									
Linnea									
Alexander									
Troy									
Andreas									
Sasa									
Elin									
Debbie									
Alex									
Karin									

== Nominations table ==
Undisclosed Nominations are represented by "N/A"

	Week 1		Week 2	Week 3	Week 4	Week 5	Week 6	Week 7	Week 8		Week 9		Week 10		
	Day 3	Day 5	Week 2	Week 3	Week 4	Week 5	Week 6	Week 7	Day 49	Day 52	Day 61	Day 63	Day 66	Final	
Christian	Myrna, Debbie	No nominations	No nominations	Not eligible	N/A	Banned	Not eligible	No nominations	Power; Player		Myrna, N/A		No nominations	Winner (Day 70)	
Puffen	N/A	No nominations	No nominations	Not eligible	N/A	N/A	Sergio	No nominations	In Paradise Room	No nominations	Isabella, Lina		No nominations	Runner-Up (Day 70)	
Isabella	Not in House	No nominations	No nominations	Not eligible	N/A	Troy, André	Power; Player	No nominations	No nominations	No nominations	N/A		No nominations	Third Place (Day 70)	
Patricia	N/A	No nominations	No nominations	Not eligible	N/A	Alexander, N/A	Not eligible	Power; Player	No nominations	No nominations	André, Myrna		No nominations	Fourth Place (Day 70)	
Sergio	Alex, N/A	No nominations	No nominations	Not eligible	N/A	N/A	Alexander	No nominations	No nominations	No nominations	N/A		No nominations	Fifth Place (Day 70)	
André	N/A	No nominations	No nominations	Not eligible	N/A	N/A	Anna-Lisa	No nominations	In Paradise Room	No nominations	N/A		No nominations	Evicted (Day 66)	
Myrna	N/A	No nominations	No nominations	Not eligible	N/A	Banned	Not eligible	No nominations	No nominations	No nominations	Puffen, N/A		Evicted (Day 63)		
Lina	Patricia, Linnea	No nominations	No nominations	Not eligible	N/A	Banned	Not eligible	No nominations	No nominations	No nominations	Myrna, Isabella	Evicted (Day 61)			
Anna-Lisa	Not in House	No nominations	No nominations	Not eligible	N/A	Troy, N/A	Not eligible	Power; Player	No nominations	No nominations	Evicted (Day 56)				
Sara	Not in House	No nominations	Power; Player	Not eligible	N/A	Troy, Alexander	Not eligible	No nominations	No nominations	Evicted (Day 52)					
Linnea	N/A	No nominations	No nominations	Not eligible	Power; Player	N/A	Not eligible	No nominations	Walked (Day 47)						
Alexander	Not in House	No nominations	No nominations	Elin, Lina, Puffen	Immune	Banned	Linnea	Evicted (Day 42)							
Troy	André, Alex	Power; Player	No nominations	Not eligible	N/A	Alexander, N/A	Evicted (Day 35)								
Andreas	Not in House	No nominations	No nominations	Not eligible	N/A	Evicted (Day 28)									
Sasa	Alex, Troy	No nominations	No nominations	Not eligible	Walked (Day 24)										
Elin	Not in House	No nominations	No nominations	Not eligible	Evicted (Day 21)										
Debbie	N/A	No nominations	No nominations	Evicted (Day 14)											
Alex	Troy, Linnea	No nominations	Evicted (Day 6)												
Karin	N/A	No nominations	Evicted (Day 6)												
Nomination note	1, 2, 3		2, 4	2, 5	1, 2, 6, 7	1, 2, 8	1, 2, 9, 10	1, 2, 11, 12	1, 2, 12, 13	1, 2, 14	2, 15		2, 16	2, 17	
Saved (after nomination)	none				Alexander, Troy	none		Isabella, Myrna, Patricia, Sergio	none						
Against public vote	~~Alex,~~; ~~Linnea,~~; ~~Patricia,~~; ~~Troy~~	none	Andreas, Anna-Lisa, Debbie, Elin, Isabella, Myrna, Sergio	Elin, Lina, Patricia, Puffen	Andreas, Anna-Lisa, Lina, Patricia	Alexander, André, Patricia, Troy	André	André, Lina, ~~Linnea,~~; Puffen, Sara	none	none	André, Isabella, Myrna, Puffen		André, Christian, Isabella, Patricia, Puffen, Sergio	Christian, Isabella, Patricia, Puffen, Sergio	
Against public vote	~~Alex,~~; ~~Linnea,~~; ~~Patricia,~~; ~~Troy~~	none	Andreas, Anna-Lisa, Debbie, Elin, Isabella, Myrna, Sergio	Elin, Lina, Patricia, Puffen	Andreas, Anna-Lisa, Lina, Patricia	Alexander, André, Patricia, Troy	Alexander, Anna-Lisa, Lina, Sergio	André, Lina, ~~Linnea,~~; Puffen, Sara	none	none	André, Isabella, Myrna, Puffen		André, Christian, Isabella, Patricia, Puffen, Sergio	Christian, Isabella, Patricia, Puffen, Sergio	
Walked	none				Sasa	none		Linnea	none						
Evicted	No; Eviction	Alex; Troy's choice to evict	Debbie; Fewest votes (out of 2) to save	Elin; Fewest votes (out of 2) to save	Andreas; Fewest votes (out of 2) to save	Troy; Fewest votes (out of 2) to save	André; Most votes to save	André; Most votes to move	Sara; André & Puffen's choice to evict	Patricia; Christian's choice to evict	Lina; Housemate's choice to evict	Myrna; Fewest votes (out of 2) to save	André; Fewest votes to save	Sergio; Fewest votes (out of 5) to win	Patricia; Fewest votes (out of 4) to win
Evicted	No; Eviction	Alex; Troy's choice to evict	Debbie; Fewest votes (out of 2) to save	Elin; Fewest votes (out of 2) to save	Andreas; Fewest votes (out of 2) to save	Troy; Fewest votes (out of 2) to save	André; Most votes to save	André; Most votes to move	Sara; André & Puffen's choice to evict	Patricia; Christian's choice to evict	Lina; Housemate's choice to evict	Myrna; Fewest votes (out of 2) to save	André; Fewest votes to save	Isabella; Fewest votes (out of 3) to win	Puffen; Fewest votes (out of 2) to win
Evicted	No; Eviction	Karin; Troy's choice to evict	Debbie; Fewest votes (out of 2) to save	Elin; Fewest votes (out of 2) to save	Andreas; Fewest votes (out of 2) to save	Troy; Fewest votes (out of 2) to save	Alexander; Fewest votes (out of 2) to save	Puffen; Most votes to move	Sara; André & Puffen's choice to evict	Anna-Lisa; Christian's choice to evict	Lina; Housemate's choice to evict	Myrna; Fewest votes (out of 2) to save	André; Fewest votes to save	Isabella; Fewest votes (out of 3) to win	Puffen; Fewest votes (out of 2) to win
Evicted	No; Eviction	Karin; Troy's choice to evict	Debbie; Fewest votes (out of 2) to save	Elin; Fewest votes (out of 2) to save	Andreas; Fewest votes (out of 2) to save	Troy; Fewest votes (out of 2) to save	Alexander; Fewest votes (out of 2) to save	Puffen; Most votes to move	Sara; André & Puffen's choice to evict	Anna-Lisa; Christian's choice to evict	Lina; Housemate's choice to evict	Myrna; Fewest votes (out of 2) to save	André; Fewest votes to save	Christian; Most votes to win	

=== Notes ===
- ^Note 1: This housemate was the current Power Player.
- ^Note 2: On Day 2, Power Player Lina chose Christian to be the first finalist from the season, granting him immunity from every eviction of the season and therefore could not be nominated by his fellow housemates. On Day 3, Power Player Lina also chose Patricia to have a nomination every week in the house.
- ^Note 3: As Power Player, Troy had the power to evict two housemates. On Day 6, he decided to evict Alex and Karin.
- ^Note 4: This week, the house was divided into two sides, the Luxury side and the Poor side. The public voted for their favourite side. Housemates on the winning side are guaranteed safe in the Big Brother house. The poor side won, and the housemates on the luxury side are nominated. As Power Player, Sara has immunity from this eviction. Patricia wasn't nominated this time because she's on the luxury side.
- ^Note 5: This week, only the Power Player, Alexander, was eligible to nominate.
- ^Note 6: On Day 24, Sasa chose to leave the house due to personal reasons.
- ^Note 7: Power Player Linnea chose to save Troy from eviction. Alexander used the immunity he won last week, therefore immune this week.
- ^Note 8: Power Player Sergio had to select four housemates who should be banned from this week's nominations. He chose Alexander, André, Christian and Lina.
- ^Note 9: Power Player Isabella got the choice to cancel Patricia's permanent nomination or steal Christian's final. She decided to cancel Patricia's permanent nomination.
- ^Note 10: This week was Nomination Roulette. The housemate's picture shown on the screen would immediately nominate a housemate. André received a "death sentence" as his fate was decided by viewers through the poll on the Big Brother website, and he couldn't be nominated by housemates. Christian and Power Player Isabella were also not eligible for nomination.
- ^Note 11: This week, all housemates were nominated for eviction, except Christian and Power Player. Anna-Lisa had the power to save some housemates from the chopping block.
- ^Note 12: During Sunday's live show, there was no eviction. Instead, this week's public vote was on which two players are going to the paradise room. The two who were voted to spend three days in the room are André and Puffen. They will select one housemate to leave the house. On Day 52, they came back to the main house. Later, they decided to evict Sara.
- ^Note 13: Power player Christian had a chance to give immunity to someone for future use.
- ^Note 14: Christian had to select two housemates to leave the house. He chose to evict Anna-Lisa and Patricia. In the studio, Adam announced there would be a twist, only one housemate would leave the show for real. Anna-Lisa left and Patricia re-entered the house.
- ^Note 15: This week was Grim Reaper week. On Day 61, Death wanted one housemate to leave with him. He then picked two housemates: André and Lina. They had one hour to make a decision, but they failed, so the decision fell to the other housemates, who voted for Lina to leave.
- ^Note 16: There was a poll on Instagram; the public were voting for their favorite housemate. On Day 66, it was announced Isabella received the most votes, and thus was the first finalist. André was evicted for receiving the fewest votes. Prior to the eviction, any housemate was offered 15.000 kr to leave voluntarily, but none did.
- ^Note 17: For the final week, the public was voting to win rather than to save.
