= Katerina Kazelis =

Swedish singer (born 1977)

- Born: 4 March 1977 (age 49); Malmö, Sweden
- Occupations: Singer, reality TV star
- Known for: Big Brother

Katerina Kazelis (born 4 March 1977) is a Swedish singer and Big Brother 2011 housemate.

== Biography ==
=== Big Brother ===
Before entering the Big Brother house on 20 February 2011 Kazelis of Serbian and Greek descent was a school teacher. She was nominated each week except for two when she won immunity after winning a Big Brother task, also surviving each elimination round from week one in the house. On 8 May Kazelis was finally evicted from the Big Brother house. Kazelis has become the most talked-about housemate of the 2011 season of the show after several outbursts and her outspoken ways about her fellow housemates.

During Kazelis' stay in the Big Brother house, she auditioned for Basshunter for a chance to record the official Big Brother 2011 anthem. Kazelis, who was suffering from a cold, was not chosen to record the song titled "Fest i hela huset".

=== 2011: After Big Brother and record deal ===
On 6 June Kazelis revealed she had signed a record deal and was to release her first music single called "Make You One of Mine" the same day, during Nyhetsmorgon on TV4. She also revealed that a music video had been made to be released with her debut music album later in 2011. But in December 2011, Kazelis revealed through her blog that the single and album had been postponed due to conflicts with the record company.

Before her appearance on Big Brother, Katerina Kazelis had worked as a teacher, a job she had to quit when she gained a place in the series.

After eviction, she stated she was not returning to her previous job and would focus on her music career. However, as of spring of 2013, Kazelis had returned working as a school teacher at Munkhätteskolan in Malmö. 2016 she started working as "first teacher" (förste lärare) at Apelgårdsskolan in Rosengård, Malmö.

== Discography ==
=== Singles ===
Year	Single	Peak positions
Year	Single	SWE
2011	"Make You One of Mine"	–
