= Big Brother (Danish TV series) season 4 =

Big Brother
- Season 4
- No. of days: 42; Day 105
- No. of housemates: 21
- Winner: Amanda
- Runner-up: Henrik

Season chronology
- Next → Season 5

The fourth season of the Danish reality television series Big Brother was produced by Endemol and premiered on January 30, 2012, on Kanal 5. The season was hosted by Marie Egede and lasted 100 days with the winner receiving a prize of 500,000 Danish krones (DKK).

== Housemates ==
Name	Age on entry	Occupation	Residence
Alexander Foss	19	Chef	Herlufmagle
Amanda Heisel	19	Warehouse worker	Tølløse
Cathrine Petersen	24	Student	Copenhagen
Christian Brandt	27	Carpenter	Copenhagen
Louise "Clifford" Jensen	22	Store employee	Copenhagen
Denise Sørensen	22	Take-away Employee	Brøndby
Guido Parisi	24	Italian chef	Vejle
Henrik Andreassen	23	Salesman	Thyborøn
Lasse Jensen	22	Consultant	Aalborg
Lesley Bilgrav	25	Model	Albertslund
Line Veiss-Pedersen	26	Hairdresser	Copenhagen
Louise Rasmussen	19	During training	Svenstrup
Mads Nielsen	27	Student	Vanløse
Michael "Melander" Melander	46	Transfer payment	Copenhagen
Mette	21	Take-away Employee	Aalborg
Michella Christensen	24	Model, Event Girl, Stripper and Singer	Kongens Lyngby
Nicolai Bøgebjerg	19	Nursing Student	Fredericia
Patricia Andersen	24	Emergency Medical Technician	Næstved
Stine Solgaard	29	Consultant	Højbjerg
Thomas Jensen	23	Student	Copenhagen
Umar Nyonyintono	26	Personal trainer and model	Valby

== Weekly summary ==
The main events in the Big Brother 2012 House are summarized in the table below. A typical Week began with the shopping task, followed by the nominations, and ended with the eviction of a Housemate during the live Sunday episode. Evictions, tasks, and other events for a particular week are noted. The diary of happenings in the house are listed in order of sequence. Each week has its own theme.

Weekly summary
Week 1	Week theme	Surprising
Week 1	Tasks / Events	Day 1: Mads entered the house as the first housemate thinking he was a secret agent. The other participants were told about it in advance.; Day 1: Mads first task as a secret agent was to summon all the girls on the toilet - a task he succeeded.; Day 2: Early in the morning Mads second task was to gather his clothes and dump it all in the jacuzzi when everyone else were sleeping. The following day he should try to blame it on someone else.; Day 2: The 3 housemates in the Bunnie House received a task to peel carrots. The Bunnie housemate who peeled the most carrots within 3 days won a place in the real Big Brother house.; Day 2: Mads was told he could stay in the house when Big Brother revealed that the other housemates knew he was a secret agent - and that he was safe in the upcoming nomination.; Day 3: Michella was told that she was a secret agent for the Bunnie housemates.; Day 5: Clifford peels the most carrots and gets to stay in the Big Brother house.; Day 7: The housemates had to wear Robin Hood costumes, take practice shots. If they had won (which they did not) they would have had 4 rabbits for lunch.
Week 1	Punishments	
Week 1	Entrances	Alexander, Amanda, Cathrine, Christian, Guido, Henrik, Lesley, Line, Louise, Mads, Melander, Michella, Patricia, Stine, Thomas, and Umar moved into the main house.; Clifford, Lasse and Nicolai moved into the Bunnie House.; At day 4 the DJ-duo Svenstrup & Vendelboe came and played a concert for the Housemates.; At day 4 Michella moved from the main house into the Bunnie House.; At day 7 Clifford, Lasse was moved into the main house.; At day 7 Michella was moved back into the main house.
Week 1	Exits	Lesley left the house on day 3, because her sister supposedly had been victim of a serious car accident.; The DJ-duo Svenstrup & Vendelboe left the house after their concert was done.; NOVA FM's listeners did not save Nicolai and therefore he had to leave the house on day 7.; The TV viewers did not save Louise and therefore she had to leave the house on day 7.
Week 2	Week theme	Yes Week
Week 2	Tasks / Events	Day 8: Patricia and Thomas were asked to wear an electric shock suit. Mission accomplished (said YES).; Line and Henrik were asked to do a photoshoot. Mission failed (said NO).; Stine were asked to do house cleaning for 3 days. Mission accomplished (said YES).; Day 9: Mads and Amanda were asked to wear a 2-man suit. Mission failed (Amanda gave up after 1 hour).; Alexander were asked to listen to a music track. Mission failed (said NO).; Umar were asked if the bunnies should live in their cage for another 24 hours. Mission failed (said NO).; Day 10: Line and Henrik were asked to do a photoshoot. Mission failed (said NO).; Alexander were asked to listen to a music track. Mission accomplished (said YES).; Mads and Amanda were asked to do wear a 2-man suit. Mission failed (said NO).; Umar were asked if the bunnies should live in their cage for another 24 hours. Mission accomplished (said YES). Clifford and Lasse enters the bunnie cage again.; Day 11: Clifford and Lasse are set free.; Day 14: Melander breaks a token heart and therefore can not be nominated this week. Alexander is nominated because of Melanders action.
Week 2	Punishments	
Week 2	Entrances	
Week 2	Exits	The TV viewers did not save Line and therefore she had to leave the house on day 14.
Week 3	Week theme	Love Week
Week 3	Tasks / Events	Teams: Melander/Alexander/Line, Cathrine/Mads, Clifford/Thomas, Patricia/Christian, Michella/Henrik, Amanda/Lasse, Stine/Umar. Guido is Love King.: Day 15: Create and perform an Italian-love-soap-opera.; Day 17: Big Brother tells the Housemates that Michella and Henrik are safe from nomination.; Day 21: 3 boys vs. 3 girls had to change tires on a car. Boys won.
Week 3	Punishments	
Week 3	Entrances	
Week 3	Exits	The TV viewers did not save Stine and therefore she had to leave the house on day 21.
Week 4	Week theme	Boys and Girls - 1950s theme.
Week 4	Tasks / Events	Day 22: Boys: Builds a small playhouse.; Girls: Housework - including skinning 2 chickens.; Day 23: Girls: Builds a small playhouse.; Boys: Housework, babysitting for 10 kids and preparing dinner.; Day 24: Photoshoot.; Day 25: Boys wins the weeks assignment and gets a 'boys only' (+ Patricia) party.; Day 26: Housemates tries to build 3 houses of cards to win a movie night - but fails.; Day 27: Photoshoot winners are announced. Alexander/Michella and Henrik wins a basket with goods.; Day 28: Soccer Tournament.; Blue Team: Melander, Henrik, Patricia, Alexander, Amanda, Thomas and Guido. Red Team: Lasse, Cathrine, Christian, Clifford, Michella, Umar and Mads. Red Team Won - 5 points.
Week 4	Punishments	
Week 4	Entrances	Day 23: 10 kids.; Day 28: A Girl Guard entered the House.
Week 4	Exits	Day 23: 10 kids.; Day 28: The Girl Guard left again after they had played a few tunes and marched through the house.; The TV viewers did not save Lasse and therefore he had to leave the house on day 28.
Week 5	Week theme	Ignore the Obvious.
Week 5	Tasks / Events	Teams: Blue Team: Melander, Henrik, Patricia, Alexander, Amanda, Thomas and Guido. Red Team: Lasse, Cathrine, Christian, Clifford, Michella, Umar and Mads.: Day 32: Blue team won the ignore week 20-22.
Week 5	Punishments	
Week 5	Entrances	Day 29: Early in the morning, Julie Ølgaard entered the house.; Day 29: A female opera singer entered the house.; Day 29: A big fat man in underwear entered the house.; Day 29: A big fat man entered the house.; Day 29: Kira Eggers entered the house.; Day 30: A Mime Artist entered the house.; Day 30: A Ninja entered the house.; Day 30: A Mime Artist entered the house.; Day 30: 2 Stuntmen entered the house.; Day 30: A Laughing Club entered the house.; Day 31: A female dwarf entered the house on 3 different occasions.; Day 31: A Clown entered the house on 3 different occasions.; Day 32: A TV-viewer and her son entered the house.; Day 32: Heino Hansen (Danish Comedian) entered the house.; Day 32: A Behavior Analyst entered the house.; Day 32: A Wellness Team entered the house.; Day 32: A Chef and a waiter entered the house.; Day 32: A Dwarf entered the house.; Day 33: Walid 'Knaldperlen' (Danish reality TV participant) entered the house.; Day 33: Denise and Mette entered the house as new housemates.
Week 5	Exits	Day 29: Julie Ølgaard left the house after trying to get a reaction from the housemates.; Day 29: The female opera singer left the house after singing.; Day 29: The big fat man left the house when he had finished making breakfast for himself and after trying to get a reaction from the housemates.; Day 29: The big fat man left the house after trying to get a reaction from the housemates.; Day 29: Kira Eggers left the house after trying to get a reaction from the housemates.; Day 30: The Mime Artist left the house after trying to get a reaction from the housemates.; Day 30: The Ninja left the house after trying to get a reaction from the housemates.; Day 30: The Mime Artist left the house after trying to get a reaction from the housemates.; Day 30: The 2 Stuntmen left the house after a staged fight.; Day 30: The Laughing Club left the house after trying to get a reaction from the housemates.; Day 31: The female dwarf left the house after trying to get a reaction from the housemates.; Day 31: The Clown left the house after trying to get a reaction from the housemates.; Day 32: The TV-viewer and her son left the house.; Day 32: Heino Hansen left the house after trying to get a reaction from the housemates.; Day 32: The Behavior Analyst left the house after studying the housemates.; Day 32: The Wellness Team left the house after giving the Blue Team a treat.; Day 32: The Chef and the waiter left the house after preparing a party meal for this week's winning team.; Day 32: The Dwarf left the house after trying to get a reaction from the housemates.; Day 34: Clifford was ejected due to hitting Melander.; Day 34: Melander walked 14 hours after the controversy with Clifford.; Day 35: Walid 'Knaldperlen' (Danish reality TV participant) left the house.; The TV viewers did not save Christian and therefore he had to leave the house on day 35.
Week 6	Week theme	My New Best Friend
Week 6	Tasks / Events	Day 38; Denise gave Michella half a heart. Michella was therefore safe from nomination. Mette gave Umar half a heart. Umar was therefore safe from nomination.
Week 6	Punishments	
Week 6	Entrances	Day 36: Amanda, Cathrine, Michella and Patricia moved from the main house into the Bunnie House.; Day 36: Carl-Mar Møller entered the house.; Day 37: Amanda, Cathrine, Michella and Patricia moved from the Bunnie House into the main house.; Day 37: Alexander, Guido, Henrik, Mads, Thomas and Umar moved from the main house into the Bunnie House.; Day 38: Alexander, Guido, Henrik, Mads, Thomas and Umar moved from the Bunnie House into the main house.
Week 6	Exits	Day 36: Carl-Mar Møller left the house after holding a group therapy session.; The TV viewers did not save Amanda and therefore she had to leave the house on day 42.
Week 7	Week theme	Sweden
Week 7	Tasks / Events	
Week 7	Punishments	
Week 7	Entrances	Day: 44: Everyone moved from the main house out into the Task Yard to camp overnight.; Day: 44: Denise gets injured (breast - 4 weeks since breasts enlargement operation) while sawing and moves back into the main house with Michella.; Day: 45: Everyone moved from the Task Yard back into the main house.; Day: 45: Michella gets a visit from her girlfriend and stays overnight in the Bunnie House.
Week 7	Exits	Day: 46: Denise gets really sick from pills and alcohol and is rushed to the hospital.; Day: 47: Denise is too sick to return to Big Brother 2012. Denise is ejected.; Day: 49: Amanda reentered the house.; The TV viewers did not save Mads and therefore he had to leave the house on day 49.
Week 8	Week theme	Vikings
Week 8	Tasks / Events	
Week 8	Punishments	
Week 8	Entrances	Day: 55: Cathrine, Henrik, Patricia and Umar returned from the Swedish Big Brother house.; They returned together with Annica Englund - who they 'abducted' from the Swedish Big Brother house.: Day: 56: Former housemate Melander returned as Dictator for Dictator week.
Week 8	Exits	Day: 54: Cathrine, Henrik, Patricia and Umar went - dressed as Vikings - to the Swedish Big Brother house where they spent a few hours competing with the Swedish Vikings.; The Danish Vikings won. The TV viewers did not save Mette and therefore she had to leave the house on day 56.
Week 9	Week theme	Dictator week
Week 9	Tasks / Events	
Week 9	Punishments	
Week 9	Entrances	
Week 9	Exits	Annica Englund returned to the Swedish Big Brother house on day 62. The TV viewers did not save Guido and therefore he had to leave the house on day 63.
Week 10	Week theme	Russian Roulette
Week 10	Tasks / Events	
Week 10	Punishments	
Week 10	Entrances	
Week 10	Exits	The TV viewers did not save Patricia and therefore she had to leave the house on day 70.
Week 12	Week theme	
Week 12	Tasks / Events	
Week 12	Punishments	
Week 12	Entrances	
Week 12	Exits	The TV viewers did not save Cathrine and therefore she had to leave the house on day 77.
Week 13	Week theme	
Week 13	Tasks / Events	
Week 13	Punishments	
Week 13	Entrances	
Week 13	Exits	The TV viewers did not save Thomas and therefore he had to leave the house on day 84.

== Nominations table ==
	Week 1	Week 2	Week 3	Week 4	Week 5	Week 6	Week 7	Week 8	Week 9	Week 10	Week 11	Week 12	Week 13	Week 14	Week 15		Nominations received
Amanda	Lesley ? ?	Nominated	Mads; Patricia	? ?	Melander; Michella	Alexander; Mads	Evicted (Day 42)	Cathrine; Patricia; Cathrine; Henrik	Nominated	Umar to save	Nominated	Alexander; Michella	Nominated	Alexander; Henrik	Winner (Day 105)		30
Henrik	Stine; Alexander; Alexander	Nominated	Amanda ?	Mads; Melander	Mads; Melander	Banned	Michella; Mette	Mette; Thomas	Nominated	Nominated	No; Nominations	Thomas; Alexander	Exempt	Amanda; Alexander	Runner-Up (Day 105)		17
Umar	Lesley ? Stine	No; Nominations	Amanda ?	Melander ?	Melander; Michella	Patricia; Cathrine	Michella; Alexander	Michella; Alexander; Mette; Cathrine	No; Nominations	Exempt	No; Nominations	Thomas; Michella	Exempt	Alexander; Amanda	Third Place (Day 105)		5
Alexander	Lesley ? Umar	No; Nominations	Stine ?	Lasse ?	Clifford; Christian	Mads; Amanda	Mette; Denise	Mette; Henrik; Mette; Henrik	No; Nominations	Nominated	Nominated	Henrik; Michella	Exempt	Amanda; Henrik	Evicted (Day 98)		25
Michella	Lesley ? Stine	No; Nominations	Patricia ?	Lasse; Melander	Amanda; Cathrine	Cathrine; Patricia	Cathrine; Patricia	Cathrine; Henrik; Cathrine; Henrik	No; Nominations	Not; Eligible	Exempt	Amanda; Umar	Nominated	Evicted (Day 91)			25
Thomas	Amanda; Lesley; Amanda	No; Nominations	? Stine	Melander ?	Christian; Melander	Amanda; Mads	Michella; Mette	Henrik; Umar; Henrik; Cathrine	No; Nominations	Henrik	No; Nominations	Henrik; Amanda	Evicted (Day 84)				8
Cathrine	Lesley ? ?	No; Nominations	Stine ?	? ?	Melander; Michella	Banned	Michella; Mads	Michella; Alexander	Nominated	Not; Eligible	Nominated	Evicted (Day 77)					21
Patricia	Lesley ? Amanda	No; Nominations	Stine ?	Melander ?	Michella; Melander	Banned	Michella; Mads	Alexander; Michella; Mette; Henrik	No; Nominations	Nominated	Evicted (Day 70)						9
Guido	Lesley ? ?	No; Nominations	Banned	Christian ?	Christian; Mads	Alexander; Mads	Alexander; Michella	Alexander; Michella; Mette; Cathrine	Nominated	Evicted (Day 63)							6
Mette	Not in House				Exempt	Cathrine; Amanda	Denise; Mads	Alexander; Thomas	Evicted (Day 56)								14
Mads	Lesley ? Stine	Nominated	Amanda ?	Lasse ?	Melander; Clifford	Amanda; Guido	Thomas; Denise	Evicted (Day 49)									22
Denise	Not in House				Exempt	Mads; Amanda	Mads; Guido	Ejected (Day 47)									4
Christian	Lesley; Amanda; Amanda	No; Nominations	Stine ?	Guido ?	Guido; Mads	Evicted (Day 35)											8
Melander	Lesley ? ?	No; Nominations	Umar ?	Lasse ?	Clifford; Christian; Umar	Walked (Day 34)											25
Clifford	Bunnie; House	No; Nominations	Stine ?	Melander ?	Melander; Mads	Ejected (Day 34)											5
Lasse	Bunnie; House	No; Nominations	Stine ?	Melander; Mads	Evicted (Day 28)												8
Stine	Lesley ? Amanda	No; Nominations	? ?	Evicted (Day 21)													20
Line	Louise; Lesley ?	Nominated	Evicted (Day 14)														0
Louise	Stine ? ?	Evicted (Day 7)															8
Nicolai	Bunnie; House	Evicted (Day 7)															0
Lesley	Cathrine; Patricia	Walked (Day 3)															24
Notes	1, 2	3	4	5	6	7, 8	none	9, 10	11	12, 13	14	none	15	16	none		
Up for eviction	Amanda, ~~Lesley~~, Louise	Amanda; Henrik, Line, Mads	Alexander, Stine, Umar	Lasse, Melander	~~Melander~~, Christian, Umar	Amanda, Mads	Michella, Mads	Alexander, Cathrine, Mette, Michella	Amanda, Cathrine, Henrik, Guido	Alexander, Amanda, Henrik, Patricia	Alexander, Amanda, Cathrine	Henrik, Thomas	Amanda, Michella	Alexander, Amanda	Amanda, Henrik, Umar		
Up for eviction	~~Clifford~~, Lasse, Nicolai	Amanda; Henrik, Line, Mads	Alexander, Stine, Umar	Lasse, Melander	~~Melander~~, Christian, Umar	Amanda, Mads	Michella, Mads	Alexander, Cathrine, Mette, Michella	Amanda, Cathrine, Henrik, Guido	Alexander, Amanda, Henrik, Patricia	Alexander, Amanda, Cathrine	Henrik, Thomas	Amanda, Michella	Alexander, Amanda	Amanda, Henrik, Umar		
Walked	Lesley	none			Melander	none											
Ejected	none				Clifford	none	Denise	none									
Evicted	Louise; Fewest votes to save	Line; Fewest votes to save	Stine; Fewest votes to save	Lasse; Fewest votes to save	Christian; Fewest votes to save	Amanda; Fewest votes to save	Mads; Fewest votes to save	Mette; Fewest votes (out of 3) to save	Guido; Fewest votes to save	Patricia; Fewest votes (out of 3) to save	Cathrine; Fewest votes to save	Thomas; Fewest votes to save	Michella; Fewest votes to save	Alexander; Fewest votes to save	Umar; Fewest votes to win	Henrik; Fewest votes to win	
Evicted	Nicolai; Fewest votes to save	Line; Fewest votes to save	Stine; Fewest votes to save	Lasse; Fewest votes to save	Christian; Fewest votes to save	Amanda; Fewest votes to save	Mads; Fewest votes to save	Mette; Fewest votes (out of 3) to save	Guido; Fewest votes to save	Patricia; Fewest votes (out of 3) to save	Cathrine; Fewest votes to save	Thomas; Fewest votes to save	Michella; Fewest votes to save	Alexander; Fewest votes to save	Amanda; Most votes to win		

=== Notes ===
- ^Note 1 : three housemates entered in the Bunnie House: Clifford, Lasse and Nicolai. There was a competition, and the winner would move to the main house. Clifford won the competition and moved to the main house. The public has to vote to save either Lasse and Nicolai. Nicolai received the fewest votes and was evicted. Lasse moved to the main house.
- ^Note 2 : Lesley and Louise were initially up for eviction. On Day 3, Lesley decided to walk, leaving only Louise up for eviction. Then, the housemates had to nominate a replacement for Lesley (in blue). Amanda received the most nominations and was up for eviction with Louise.
- ^Note 3 : There was a "yes" task. If Big Brother proposes something to them, they have to say "yes". If they say "no", they'll be automatically nominated. Amanda, Mads, Henrik and Line said no, and therefore they were up for eviction.
- ^Note 4 : For this week's task, all of the housemates except Guido were split into pairs (Mads & Cathrine, Melander & Alexander, Thomas & Clifford, Christian & Patricia, Umar & Stine, Amanda and Lasse, and Henrik and Michella). If one of the members of the pair wants immunity, the other has to be automatically nominated. Melander decided to accept the immunity, so Alexander was automatically nominated. Then, the public has to vote for their favourite pair. The one with the most votes will be also immune. Henrik and Michella received the most votes, and are immune this week. Then, the housemate had to nominate the other two housemates. The pair with the most votes together will be nominated. Umar and Stine received the most nominations points together, and are up for eviction with Alexander.
- ^Note 5 : All girls are immune, as there are more male than female housemates.
- ^Note 6 : Christian and Melander were initially up for eviction. On Day 34, Melander decided to walk after Clifford's ejection, leaving only Christian up for eviction. Melander had the power to choose his replacement, and he chose Umar, meaning he is up for eviction with Christian.
- ^Note 7 : Patricia, Cathrine and Henrik were banned to nominate, as punishment for discussing nominations.
- ^Note 8 : Denise and Mette were immune as they are new housemates. They had to choose another two housemates to be immune, and they chose Michella and Umar.
- ^Note 9 : On Day 47, Denise was ejected from the House. The producers decided to replace her with the last evictee, Amanda.
- ^Note 10 : Henrik, Cathrine and Mette coordinated the nominations. As punishment, Big Brother told the other housemates to nominate two of them, with 2 and 1 points (in red). Mette and Cathrine received the most points and were nominated with Alexander and Michella.
- ^Note 11 : Amanda, Cathrine, Guido and Henrik were all nominated because they refused to take part in this weekly task.
- ^Note 12 : Alexander was nominated by a Russian roulette machine during a task. To Amanda and Patricia were given the task to shout instead of talk normally. As they failed this, they were also automatically nominated.
- ^Note 13 : Thomas won a competition, and had the power to choose the fourth nominee. After he chooses it, Amanda has the power to give immunity to someone. She gives immunity to Umar. Then, Thomas chose Henrik has the fourth nominee.
- ^Note 14 : This week there was a task named "Heaven vs Hell". The housemates in hell will compete in different challenges and those who are in hell on Wednesday will be up for eviction. Cathrine found a key in a haystack and moved to Heaven. Alexander was chosen by the public to move to Heaven. Then, Cathrine was automatically nominated, after open the safety box, who in reality is to move to Hell. Then, the housemates remaining to Hell had to choose 2 of them to move to Heaven. They chose Henrik and Umar. Then, the remaining housemates competed in a challenge. Thomas won it and moved to Heaven. Alexander opened the safety box and was automatically nominated like Cathrine. Then, Amanda and Michella took part in a task where they had to make a puzzle of a devil's face and Michella won, so Amanda is nominated with Cathrine and Alexander.
- ^Note 15 : The producers put a symbol in the house, and told them that whoever broke it would win immunity for all the housemates from his or her same gender. Alexander immediately decided to break it, so the 3 guys won immunity and Amanda and Michella were nominated.
- ^Note 16 : Eva (a guest who won a competition from a magazine to enter the House) also nominated this week. She nominated Henrik with 2 points and Umar with 1 point.
