= Gualöv =

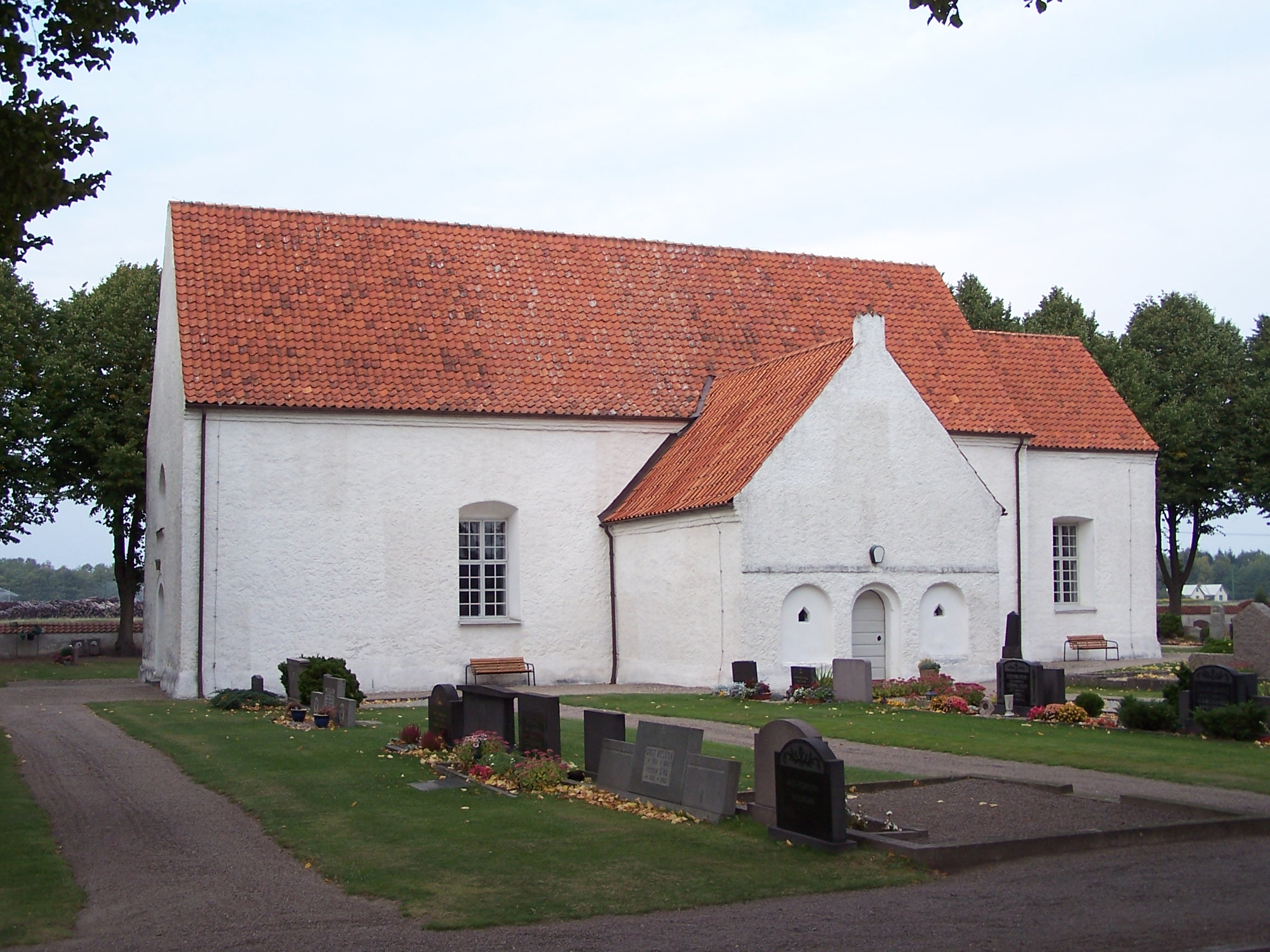
- Gualöv Church

- Location within Skåne Location within Sweden
- Coordinates: 56°03′N 14°25′E
- Country: Sweden
- Province: Skåne
- County: Skåne County
- Municipality: Bromölla Municipality

Area
  - Total: 0.72 km^{2} (0.28 sq mi)

Population (31 December 2010)
  - Total: 530
  - Density: 737/km^{2} (1,910/sq mi)
- Time zone: UTC+1 (CET)
  - Summer (DST): UTC+2 (CEST)

Gualöv is a locality situated in Bromölla Municipality, Skåne County, Sweden with 530 inhabitants in 2010.

Gualöv Church is a medieval church with well-preserved frescos and a medieval altarpiece.
