= Kanal 11 (Swedish TV channel) =

- Country: Sweden

Programming
- Language: Swedish
- Picture format: 16:9/4:3 576i (SDTV); 1080i (2005–present) (HDTV) (2011–present)

Ownership
- Owner: Warner Bros. Discovery EMEA (Skydance Corporation)
- Sister channels: Kanal 5 Kanal 9 Discovery Channel (Swedish); TLC (Swedish)

History
- Launched: 14 January 2005
- Replaced: Mediteve (2002–2005)
- Former names: TV400 (2005–2011); TV11 (2011–2013)

Links
- Website: Official website

Availability

Terrestrial
- Boxer: Channel 14

Kanal 11 (formerly TV11 and before that TV400) is a conditional access, entertainment channel owned by Warner Bros. Discovery EMEA. Its target audience is younger people and it almost solely broadcasts entertainment programmes.

The channel was launched in January 2005 to replace the interactive Mediteve channel that occupied the same space. Programming on the channel consists of action and drama series, reality series, movies and comedy. Kanal 11 also features some original programming and programmes connected to shows on TV4, such as Idol. The channel is broadcast by satellite, cable, IPTV and on the digital terrestrial network.

On 19 January 2011, the channel was relaunched and renamed TV11. Among the new programmes made for TV11 are another season of Big Brother.

On 1 June 2013, TV4 Group sold TV11 to SBS Discovery Media. On 1 October 2013, it became Kanal 11.

== Logos ==
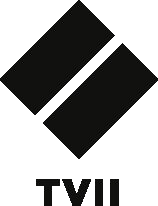
Logo prior to relaunch as Kanal 11 from 2011 to 2012

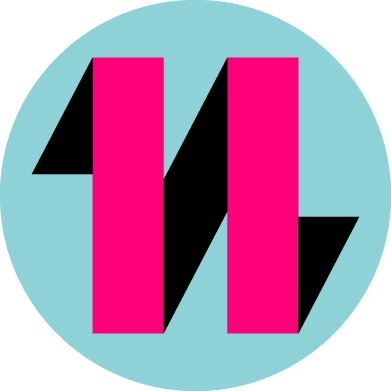
Kanal 11 first logo from 2013 to 2024

== Foreign programs ==
- The Jerry Springer Show
- The Secret Circle
- The Secret Life of the American Teenager
- The Walking Dead
- The Vampire Diaries
- The Originals
- T@gged
- Light as a Feather
- Supergirl
- The Flash (2014 TV series)
- Arrow
- Pretty Little Liars
- True Blood
- Teen Wolf
- Gossip Girl
- Once Upon a Time
- Riverdale
- Killjoys
