= 2020 in Sweden =

- Decades: 2000s; 2010s; 2020s
- See also: Other events of 2020; Timeline of Swedish history

Events in the year 2020 in Sweden.

== Incumbents ==
- Monarch – Carl XVI Gustaf
- Prime minister – Stefan Löfven

== Events ==
Ongoing — COVID-19 pandemic in Sweden

- 11 March – The first deaths recorded during the COVID-19 pandemic in Sweden.
- 25 March – The death toll of the COVID-19 pandemic in Sweden surpassed 100.
- 30 March – The death toll of the COVID-19 pandemic in Sweden surpassed 250.
- 3 April – The death toll of the COVID-19 pandemic in Sweden surpassed 500.
- 9 April – The death toll of the COVID-19 pandemic in Sweden surpassed 1 000.
- 26 April – The death toll of the COVID-19 pandemic in Sweden surpassed 2 500.
- 11 June – The death toll of the COVID-19 pandemic in Sweden surpassed 5 000.
- 29 to 30 August – Riots broke out in Malmö and Ronneby.
- 17 November - The Riks party is launched.

=== Sport ===
- 9 to 26 January – The 2020 European Men's Handball Championship is held in Malmö, Gothenburg and Stockholm (in addition to Austria and Norway).

== Deaths ==
=== January ===
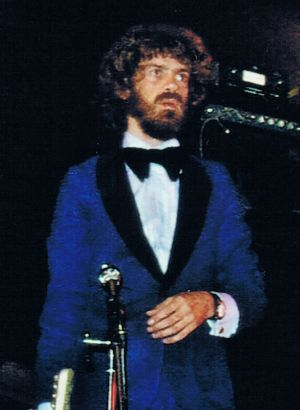
Bo Winberg

- 1 January – Bengt Levin, orienteering competitor (b. 1958).
- 3 January – Bo Winberg, guitarist (b. 1939).
- 6 January
  - Bernt Andersson, footballer (b. 1933).
  - Arne Holmgren, biochemist (b. 1940).
- 14 January – Jan-Olof Ekholm, crime fiction writer (b. 1931).
- 20 January – Ulf Norrman, Olympic sailor (b. 1935).
- 25 January
  - Anne Kulle, actress (b. 1944).
  - Holger Romander, civil servant, National Police Commissioner (b. 1921).
- 31 January – Gunnar Svensson, ice hockey player (b. 1956).

=== February ===
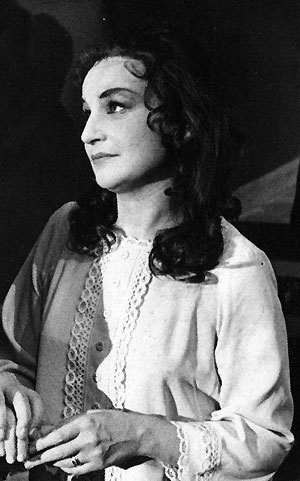
Margareta Hallin

- 6 February – Ola Magnell, musician (b. 1946).
- 9 February – Margareta Hallin, operatic soprano (b. 1931).
- 17 February – Anna-Stina Wahlberg, Olympic diver (1952, 1956) (b. 1931).
- 24 February – Olof Thunberg, actor (Winter Light, Bamse, Amorosa) (b. 1925).

=== March ===
- 1 March – Stefan Lindqvist, footballer (Halmstad, IFK Göteborg, national team) (b. 1967).
- 6 March – Anne-Marie Berglund, writer (b. 1952).
- 8 March
  - Max von Sydow, actor (b. 1929).
  - Anders Åberg, actor (Långt bort och nära, Kejsaren, Andra dansen) (b. 1948).
- 10 March – Kurt Liander, footballer (AIK, IFK Stockholm, national team) (b. 1932).
- 24 March – John Eriksson, footballer (Djurgården, national team) (b. 1929).
- 26 March – Olle Holmquist, trombonist (James Last Orchestra) (b. 1936).
- 27 March – Thandika Mkandawire, economist (b. 1940).
- 28 March – Kerstin Behrendtz, radio presenter (b. 1950).
- 29 March – Tomas Oneborg, photographer (b. 1958).

=== April ===
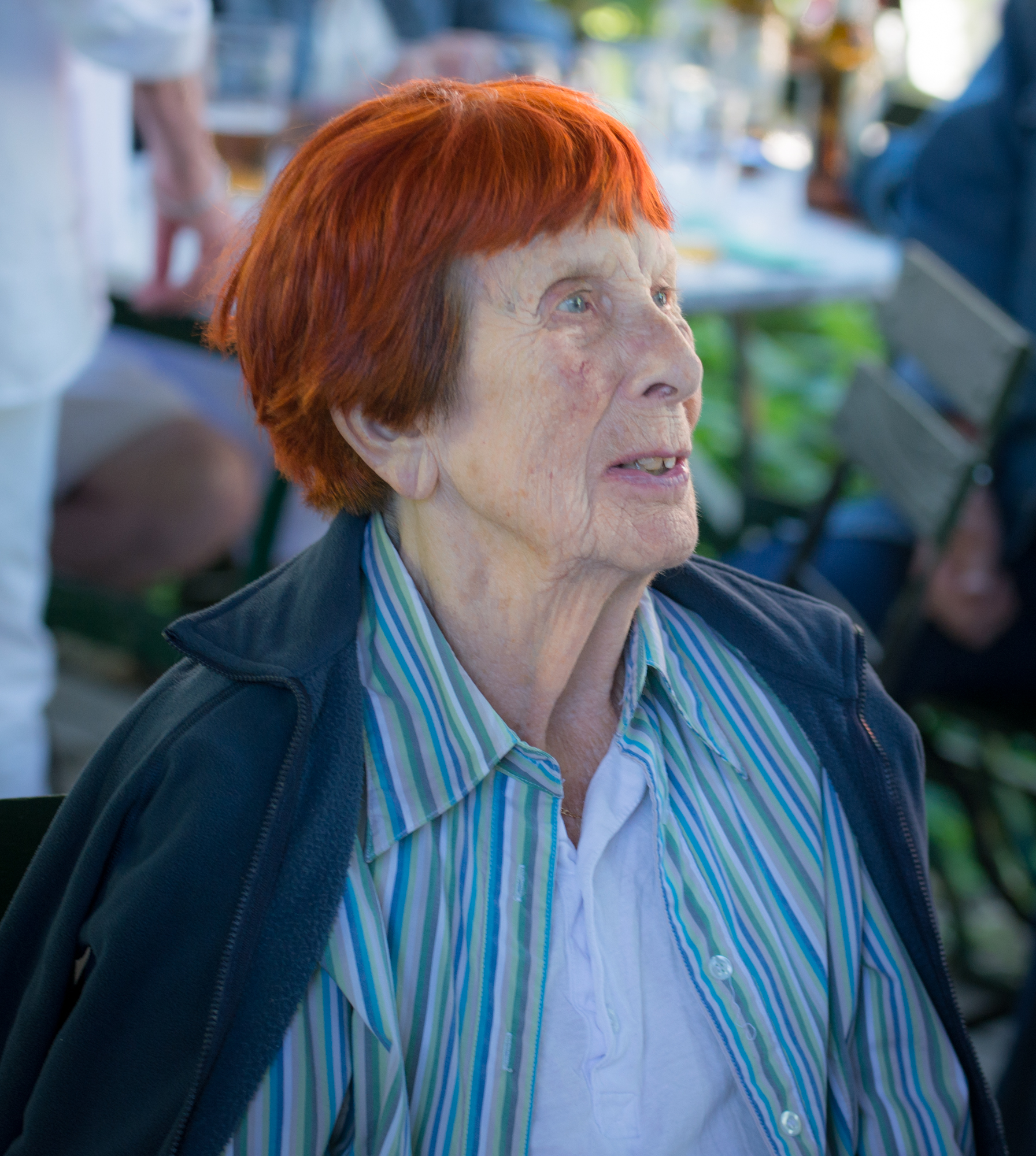
Susanna Ramel

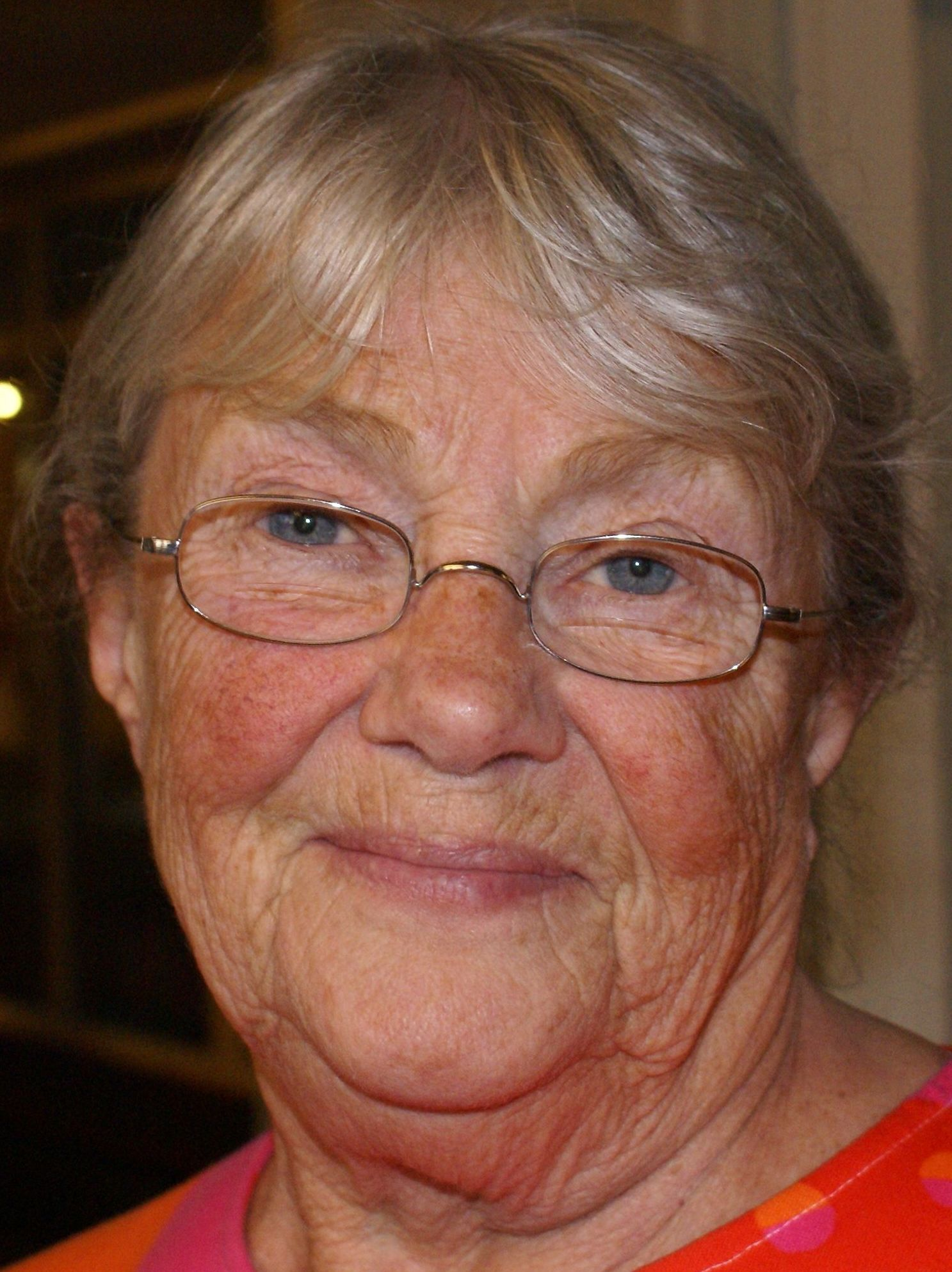
Maj Sjöwall

- 1 April – Yvonne Schaloske, actress (Rederiet) (b. 1951).
- 4 April
  - Susanna Ramel actress (b. 1920).
  - Börje Stattin, Olympic gymnast (1952) (b. 1930).
- 8 April
  - Siri Berg, abstract artist (b. 1921).
  - Lars-Eric Lundvall, ice hockey player (Frölunda), world champion (1962) and Olympic silver medallist (1964) (b. 1934).
- 10 April – Marianne Lundquist, Olympic swimmer (1948, 1952) (b. 1931).
- 14 April – Kerstin Meyer, mezzo-soprano (b. 1928).
- 15 April – Adam Alsing, television and radio presenter (Big Brother, Adam Live, Mix Megapol) (b. 1968).
- 18 April
  - Erik Belfrage, diplomat and banking executive (b. 1946).
  - Lennart Jirlow, painter and scenographer (b. 1936).
- 25 April
  - Per Olov Enquist, author (born 1934).
  - Gunnar Seijbold, photographer (b. 1955).
- 29 April – Maj Sjöwall, writer (b. 1935).

=== May ===
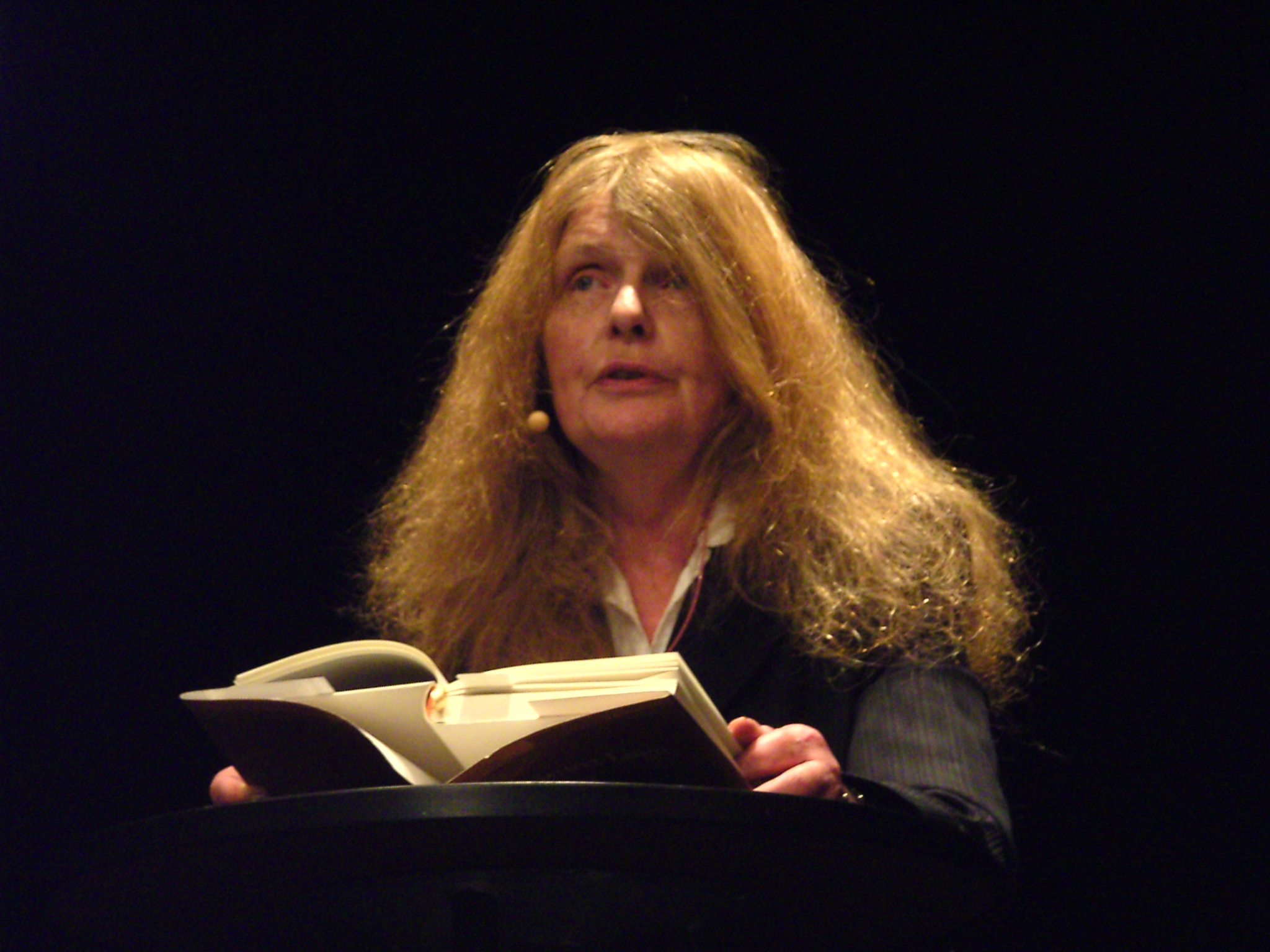
Kristina Lugn

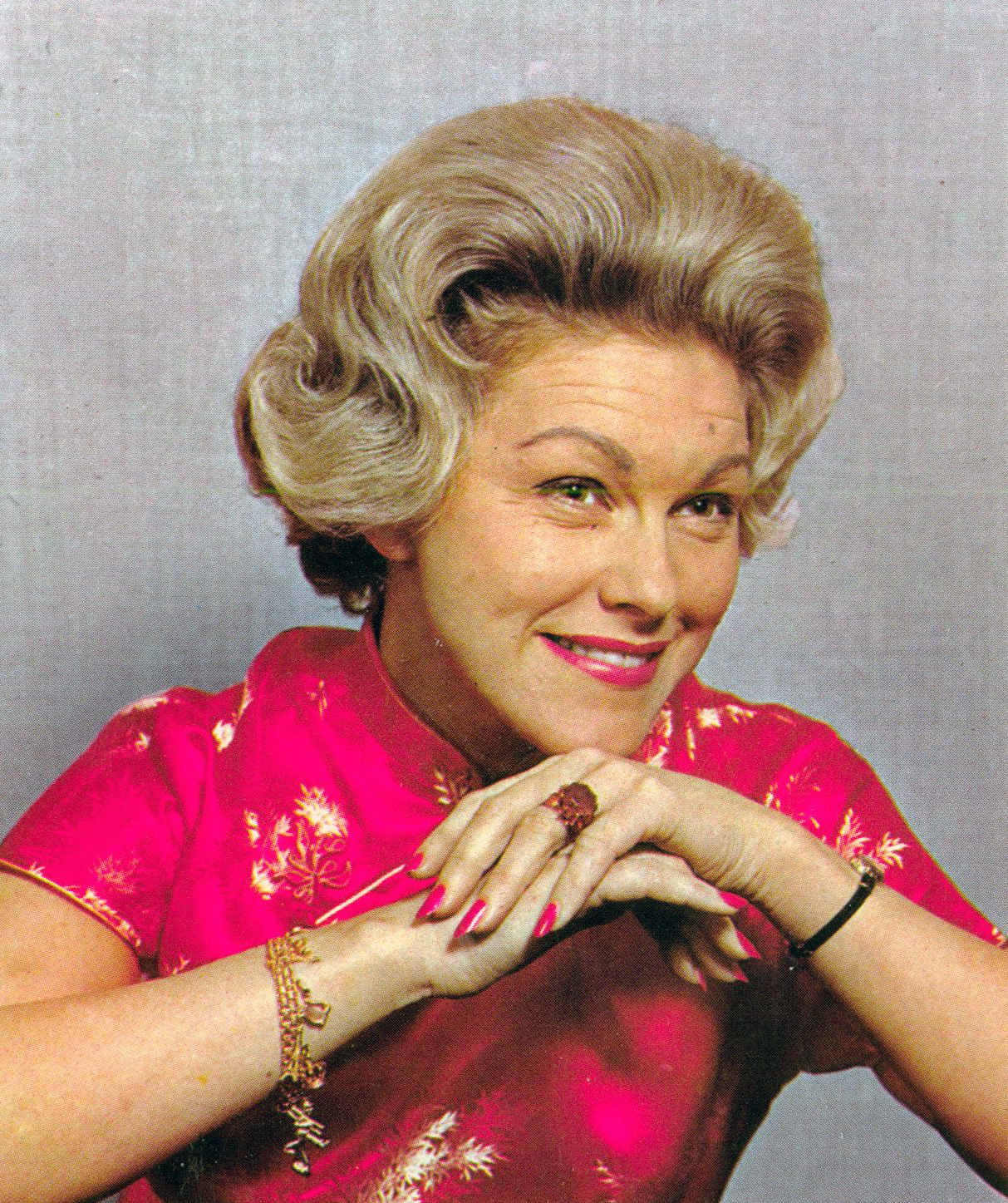
Berith Bohm

- 2 May – Jan-Olof Strandberg, actor (Wild Birds, Last Pair Out, Varning för Jönssonligan) (b. 1926).
- 4 May
  - Gunnar Larsson, sports administrator (b. 1940).
  - Anna Mohr, archaeologist (b. 1944).
- 5 May – Jan Halvarsson, cross-county skier, Olympic silver medallist (1968) (b. 1942).
- 9 May
  - Kristina Lugn, poet and writer, member of the Swedish Academy (b. 1948).
- 14 May
  - Berith Bohm, operatic soprano (b. 1932).
  - Ingvar Ericsson, Olympic runner (1952, 1956) (b. 1927).
- 15 May
  - Claes Borgström, lawyer and politician, Equality Ombudsman (2000–2007) (b. 1944).
  - Henrik Pontén, jurist (b. 1965).
- 20 May
  - Malin Gjörup, actress (Hello Baby) and operatic mezzo-soprano, cerebral haemorrhage (b. 1964).
  - Karl-Göran Mäler, environmental economist (b. 1939).
- 31 May – Carina Boberg, actress (b. 1952).

=== June ===
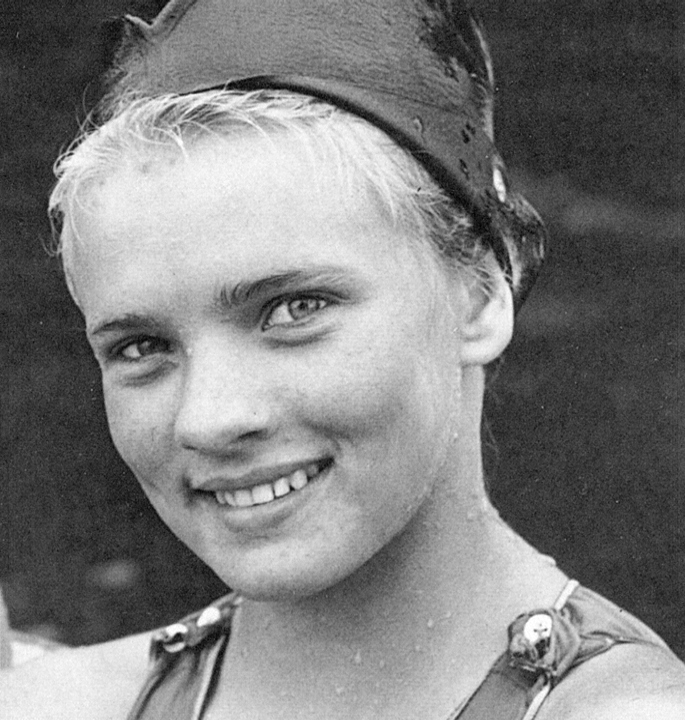
Ingegärd Fredin

- 2 June – Inga Edwards, actress (Raggare!, Wallander) (b. 1937).
- 7 June – Jean Bolinder, author (b. 1935).
- 8 June
  - Tobias Berggren, poet (b. 1940).
  - Lillemor Östlin, writer and criminal (b. 1940).
- 10 June – Zoogin, racehorse (b. 1990).
- 11 June – Colibrine Sandström, writer (b. 1928).
- 15 June – Jan Peder Lamm, archaeologist (b. 1935).
- 17 June – K. Anders Ericsson, psychologist and scholar (b. 1947).
- 18 June – Ingegärd Fredin, freestyle swimmer (b. 1930).
- 27 June – Mats Rådberg, singer (b. 1948).

=== July ===
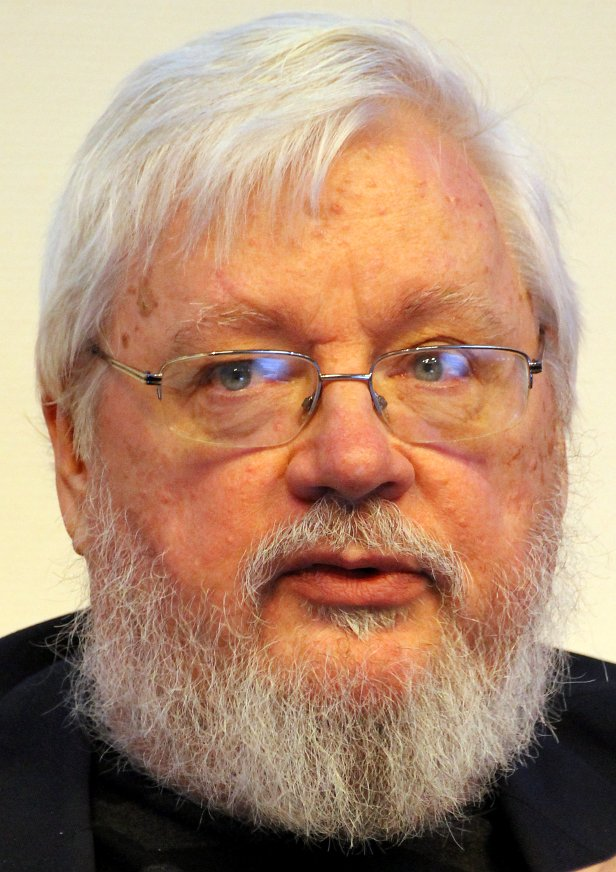
Juris Kronbergs

- 6 July – Juris Kronbergs, poet and translator (b. 1946).
- 11 July – Tõnu Puu, economist (b. 1936).
- 12 July – Henrik Ripa, politician, MP (2010–2014) (b. 1968).
- 15 July – Ivar Genesjö, Olympic fencer (1964) (b. 1931).
- 23 July
  - Hassan Brijany, actor (b. 1961).
  - Ove König, Olympic speed skater (1972) (b. 1950).
- 25 July – Jim Frick, horse harness racer (b. 1951).
- 30 July – Ann Bergman, academic (b. 1963).

=== August ===
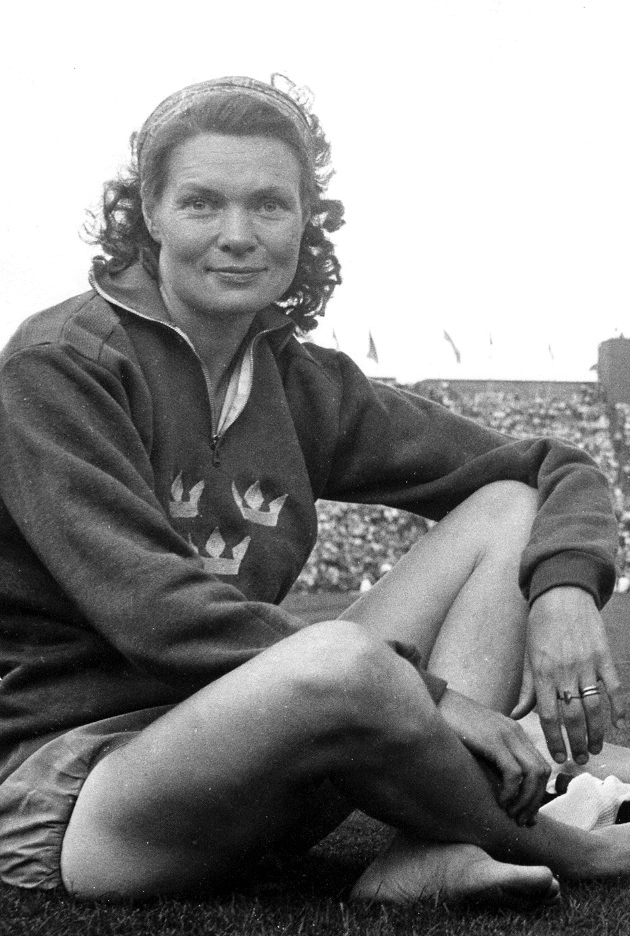
Gudrun Arenander

- 2 August - Adriana Naghei Ostrowska, murder victim (b. 2008).
- 9 August – Göran Forsmark, actor (The Hunters) (b. 1955).
- 17 August – Folke Alnevik, sprinter, Olympic bronze medallist (1948) (b. 1919).
- 18 August – Hans Cavalli-Björkman, lawyer and football club chairman (Malmö FF), 1975–1998 (b. 1928).
- 23 August – Rolf Gohs, comic creator and cover artist (Fantomen) (b. 1933).
- 25 August – Roine Carlsson, politician, Minister of Defence 1985–1991 (b. 1937).
- 28 August
  - Gudrun Arenander, Olympic discus thrower (1948) and handball player (b. 1921).
  - Assar Lindbeck, economist (b. 1930).

=== September ===
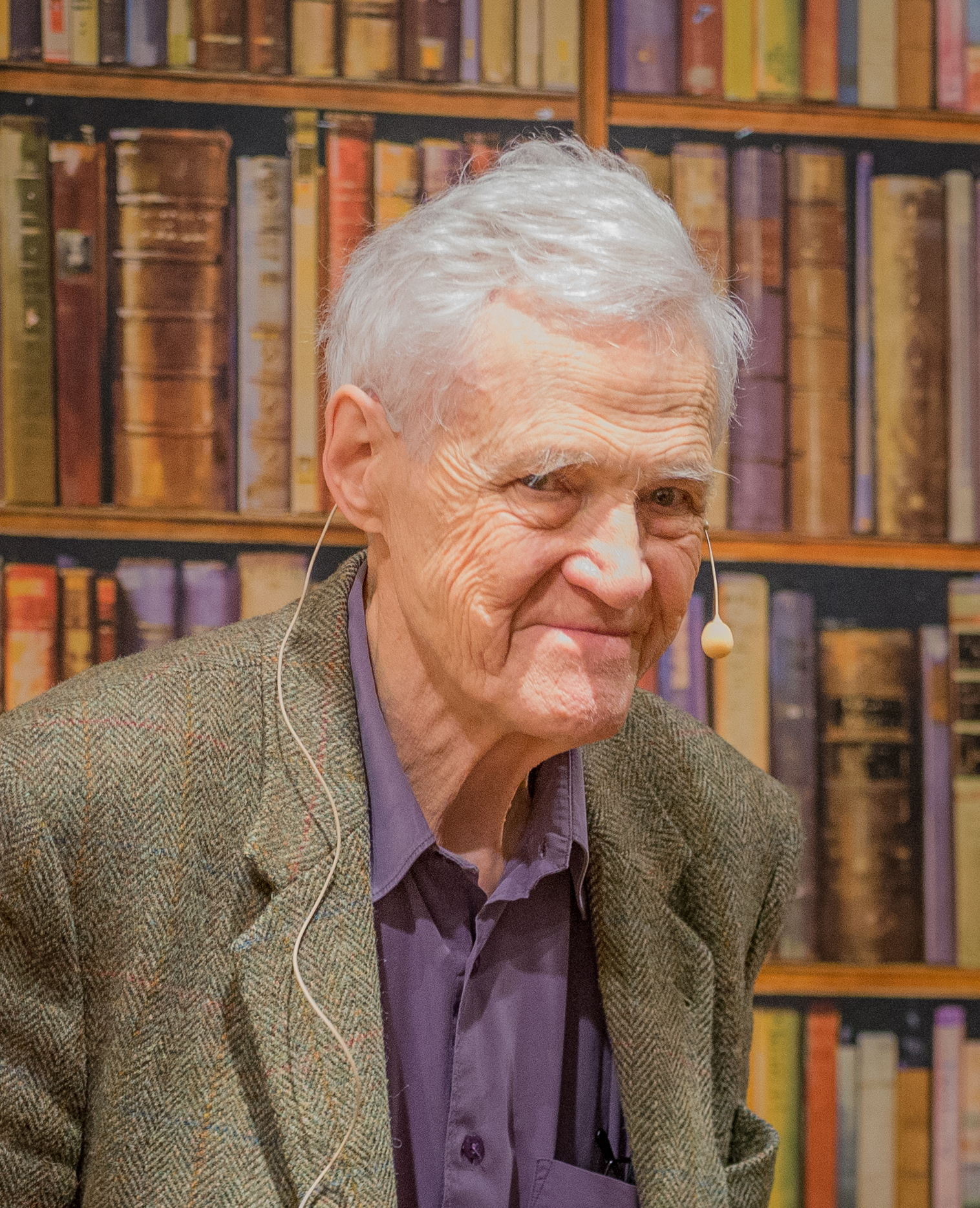
Carl-Henning Wijkmark

- 4 September – Carl-Henning Wijkmark, novelist (Stundande natten) (b. 1934).
- 6 September
  - Lennart Forsberg, footballer (GIF Sundsvall, Djurgården) (b. 1928).
  - Anita Lindblom, singer and actress (b. 1937).
- 13 September – Lars Idermark, businessman (PostNord, Swedbank, Kooperativa Förbundet) (b. 1957).
- 17 September – Birger Folke, tennis player and television commentator (b. 1936).
- 20 September – Dan Olweus, psychologist (b. 1931).
- 21 September
  - Lars-Åke Lagrell, sports personality, Governor of Kronoberg County (2002–2006) (b. 1940).
  - Sune Wehlin, Olympic modern pentathlete (1948) (b. 1923).
- 22 September – Agne Simonsson, footballer and manager (b. 1935).

=== October ===
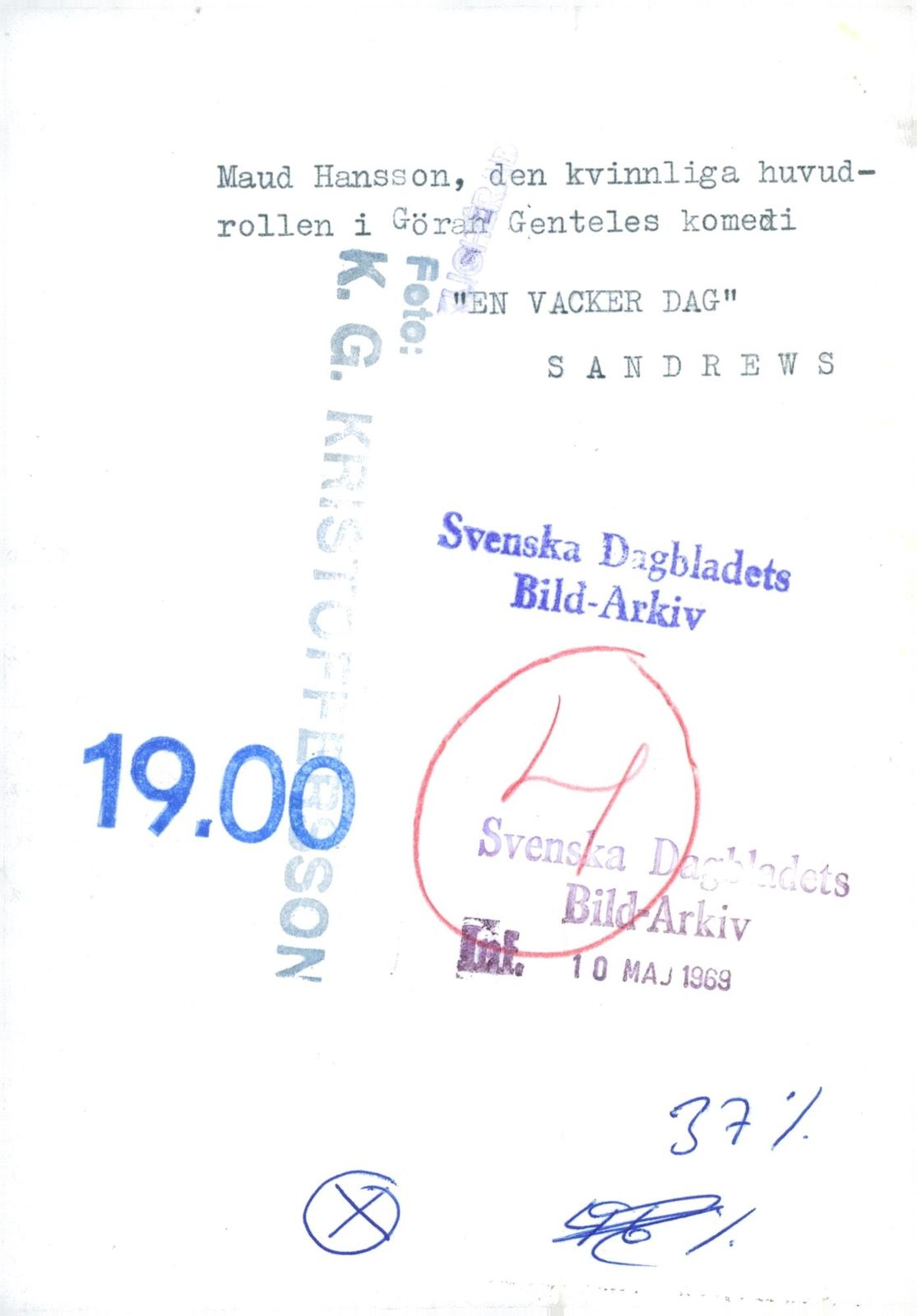
Maud Hansson

- 1 October – Maud Hansson, actress (Emil i Lönneberga) (b. 1937).
- 15 October – Sonja Edström, cross-country skier, Olympic champion (1960) and bronze medalist (1956) (b. 1930).
- 17 October – Erland Brand, painter (b. 1922).
- 19 October – Järvsöfaks, racehorse (b. 1994).
- 28 October – Anthony van den Pol, neurosurgeon (b. 1949).
- 30 October
  - Anders Hansson, racewalker (b. 1992).
  - Jan Myrdal, author and political activist (b. 1927).

=== November ===
- 10 November – Sven Wollter, actor (The Sacrifice, The Man on the Roof, A Song for Martin) (b. 1934).
- 14 November – Kay Wiestål, entrepreneur (Victoria Day) and footballer (Djurgårdens IF) (b. 1940).
- 18 November – Thore Göran Andersson, Olympic sailor (1960) (b. 1939).

=== December ===
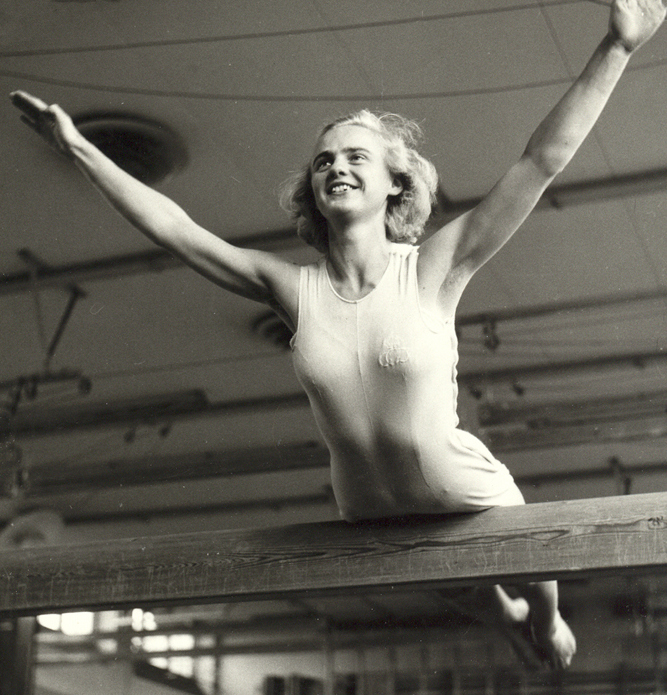
Karin Lindberg

- 2 December – Karin Lindberg, gymnast, Olympic champion (1952) (b. 1929).
- 17 December
  - Hacke Björksten, jazz bandleader and saxophonist (b. 1934).
  - Pelle Svensson, wrestler and lawyer, Olympic silver medallist (1964) (b. 1943).
- 19 December – Märta Norberg, Olympic cross-country skier (1952) (b. 1922).
- 20 December – Yvonne Sandberg-Fries, politician, MEP (2003–2004), MR (1982–1996) (b. 1950).
- 24 December
  - Roland Cedermark, musician (b. 1938).
  - Siv Widerberg, writer and journalist (b. 1931).
- 25 December – Arne Skotte, footballer (b. 1950).
- 27 December – Rolf Aggestam, poet and translator (b. 1941).
- 29 December – Gösta Linderholm, singer and composer (Rasmus på luffen) (b. 1941).
