= List of restaurants in Sweden =

This is a list of notable restaurants in Sweden.

== Stockholm ==
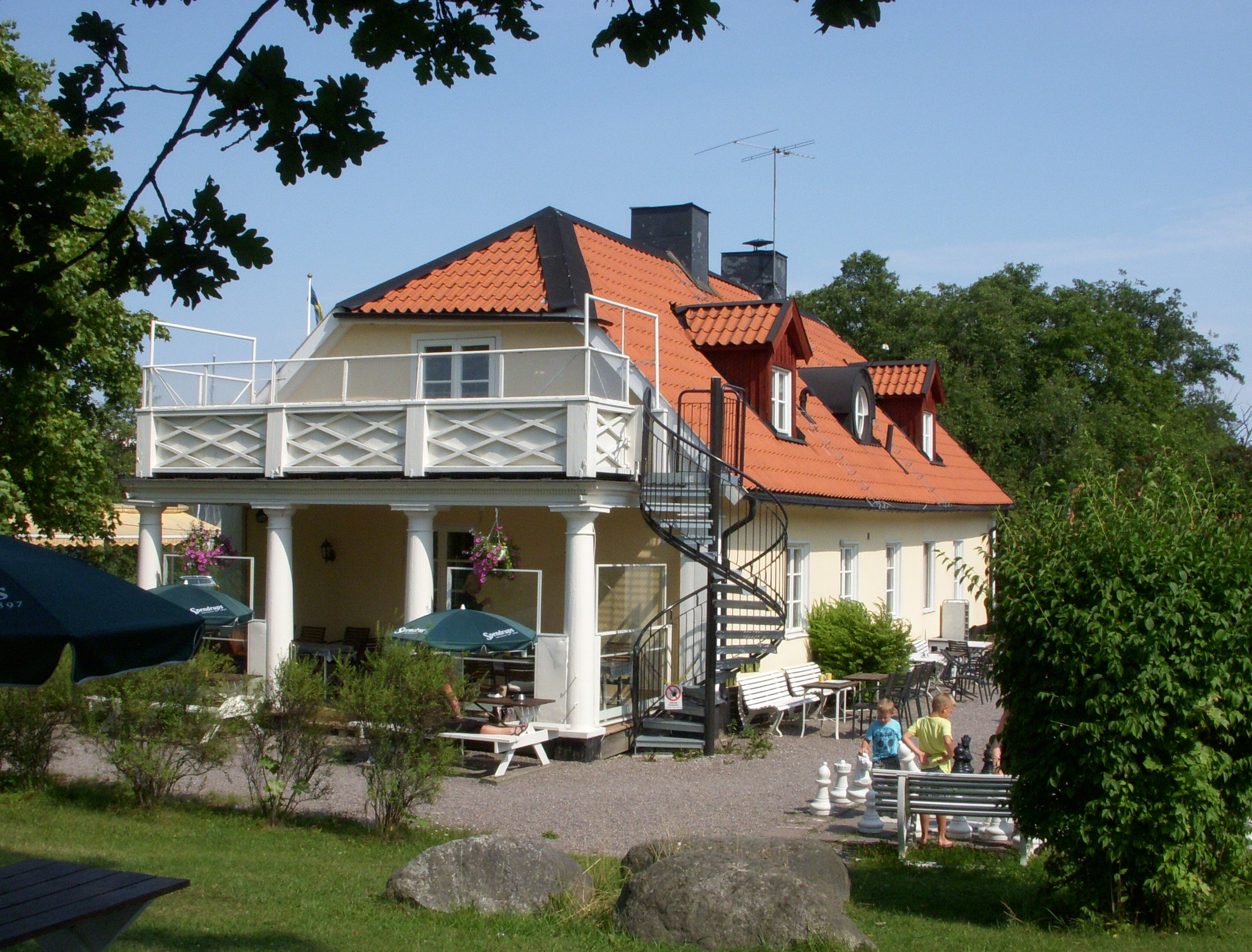
Image of the Brostugan restaurant in Stockholm, Sweden

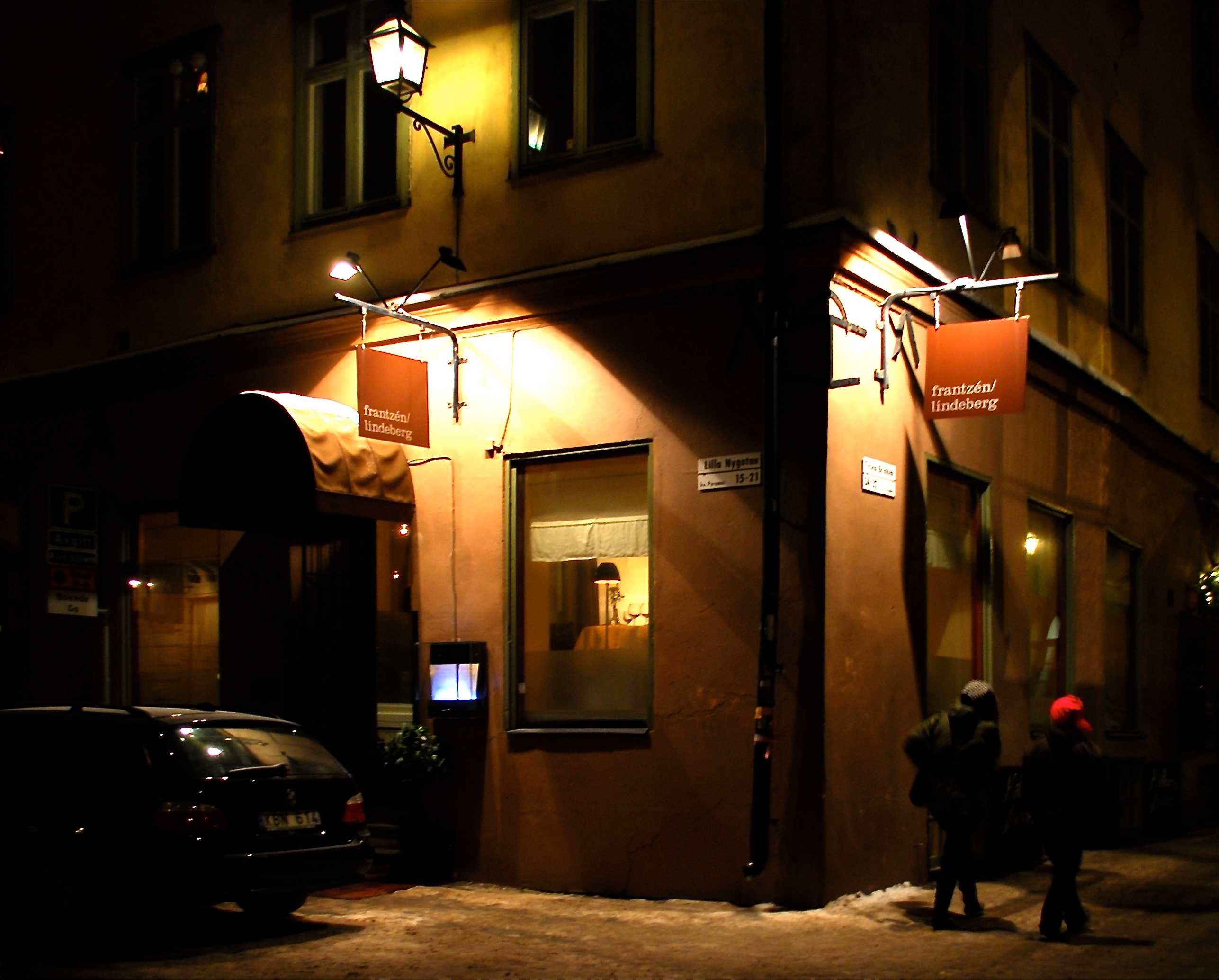
Frantzén/Lindeberg, December 2010

- Bacchi Wapen
- Bellmansro
- Berns Salonger
- Blanchs café
- Brostugan, Kärsön
- Cattelin
- Clas på Hörnet
- Crazy Horse, Stockholm
- Den gröne Jägaren
- Den gyldene freden
- Edsbacka krog
- Fem små hus
- Frantzén
- Kaknästornet
- Lady Hutton
- Mathias Dahlgren
- Operakällaren
- Stallmästaregården

== Elsewhere ==
- Flickorna Lundgren

== See also ==
- Lists of restaurants
