= Adam Alsing =

Swedish television and radio host (1968–2020)

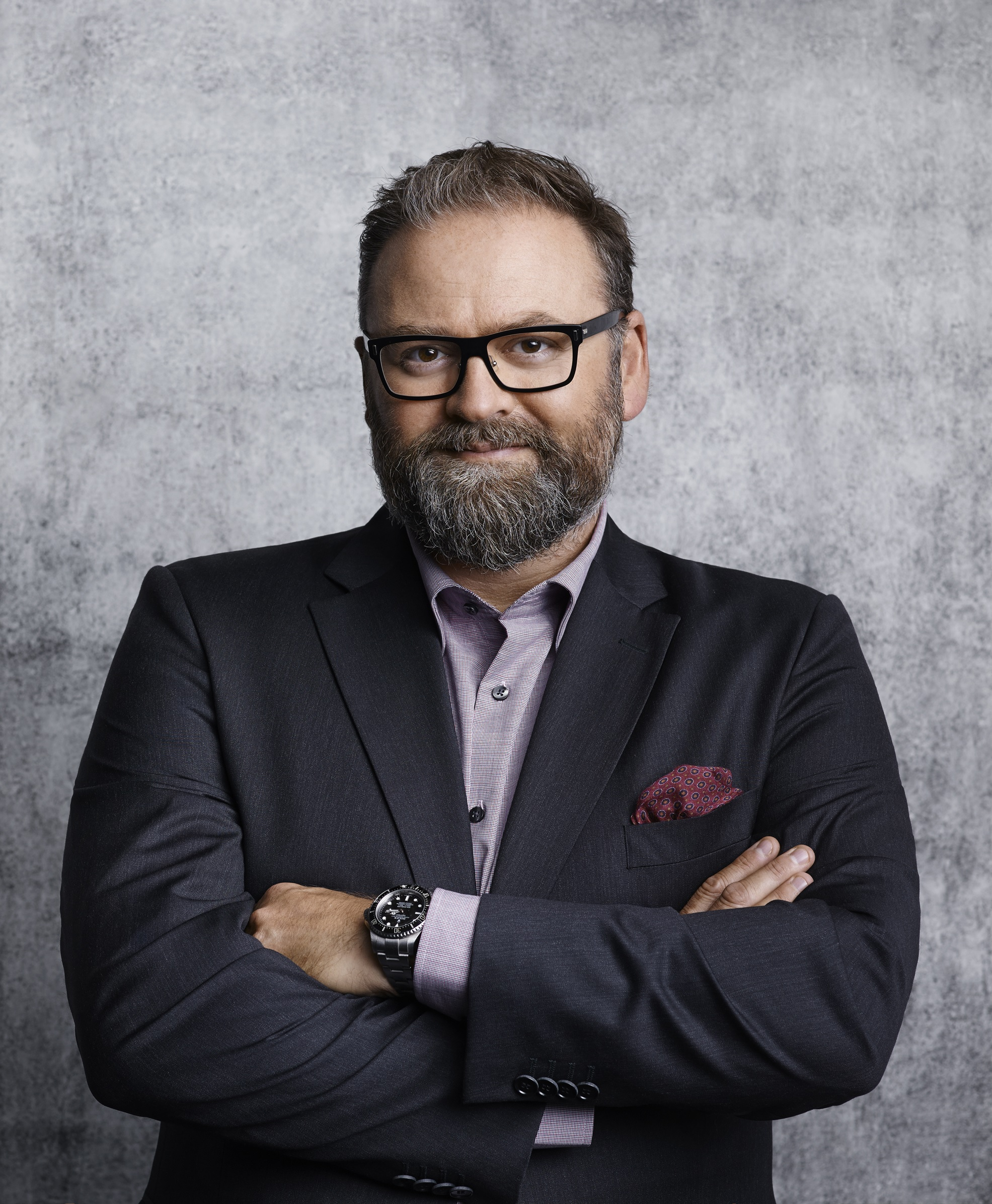
- Alsing on 17 September 2015
- Born: Rolf Adam Engelbrekt Alsing; 12 October 1968; Karlstad, Sweden
- Died: 15 April 2020 (aged 51); Stockholm, Sweden
- Occupations: Radio and television host
- Years active: 1990–2020
- Known for: Big Brother, Adam Live, Mix Megapol
- Spouse: Anette
- Children: 2

Rolf Adam Engelbrekt Alsing (12 October 1968 – 15 April 2020) was a Swedish television and radio presenter, best known for presenting Big Brother Sweden on Kanal 5. He moved to TV4 in 2005, presenting the Swedish version of Jeopardy!. He also presented his own show, Adam Live. He later ventured into radio, presenting shows on Rix FM and Mix Megapol.

== Biography ==
Alsing grew up in Karlstad in Värmland, and also in Sollefteå in Ångermanland. He worked as a disc jockey during his high school years in Karlstad. He started his career as a presenter for several local shows broadcast from Värmland on Sveriges Radio.

When TV4 started its broadcasts in 1990, he debuted as a television presenter for Twist & Shout. In 1991, he became the presenter of the dating show Tur i kärlek (Love at First Sight) along with Agneta Sjödin, and presented over 100 episodes of the show. In 1993, he moved to TV3 and started presenting his own talk show called Adam. In the mid-1990s, Alsing, along with Nikola Söderlund, started the production company "Think Big Productions"; they produced the shows Utmanarna on TV3 and Måndagsklubben on Kanal 5.

Alsing presented the Swedish version of Big Brother between 2000 and 2004 on Kanal 5, as well as the reality series Masterplan in 2005. Between 2006 and 2007, he presented Jeopardy! on TV4, taking over for Magnus Härenstam. Basshunter recorded two songs for Adam Alsing "Boten Adam" and "Sitter i luren och väntar på Adam Alsing". The first song became one of the most downloaded ringtones in Sweden in October 2006 and the second song was released on compilation album Mix Megapol 1 in 2008. Between 2009 and 2011, he presented Sveriges värsta bilförare (Sweden's Worst Driver) on TV4.

Between 5 September 2011 and 5 April 2012, Alsing presented Adam Live, a live talk show, on TV3, and in 2014, he presented Big Brother again, this time on Kanal 9. Alsing participated as a contestant in På spåret in 2011 along with Stefan Holm; the show was broadcast on SVT.

=== Radio ===
Between 2004 and 2011, Alsing, along with Gry Forssell and Anders Timell, presented the radio show Äntligen morgon on Mix Megapol. From 2012 until his death in 2020, he hosted the podcast Adam & Kompani, along with Daniel Breitholtz and Carin da Silva; the trio first met during filming of Adam Live. From 2013 until 2017, Alsing, along with Marko "Markoolio" Lehtosalo and Brita Zackari, hosted the morning show Rix MorronZoo on Rix FM.

== Personal life ==
Alsing was the son of the former editor-in-chief of the daily newspaper Aftonbladet, Rolf Alsing (1948-2026). He had a wife, Anette, and the couple had two sons together.

Alsing died on 15 April 2020, at the age of 51, from COVID-19.

== Awards ==
Name of the award, year, nominee/work of the award, award category, and the result of the nomination
Award	Year	Nominee/work	Category	Result	Ref.
Stora radiopriset	2004	Adam Alsings Frukostpass, Radio City 105.9	Morning Show of the Year	Won	
Stora radiopriset	2010	Adam Alsing	Male Host of the Year	Won	
Stora radiopriset	2010	Äntligen Morgon, Mix Megapol	Morning Show of the Year	Won	
Stora radiopriset	2011	Adam Alsing	Male Host of the Year	Won	
Stora radiopriset	2015	Adam Alsing	Male Host of the Year	Won	
