= Rolf Alsing =

Swedish journalist, editor and author (1948–2026)

Rolf Alsing (27 April 1948 – 7 April 2026) was a Swedish journalist, editor and author. He was best known for his work at Aftonbladet, where he served as editor-in-chief from 1985 to 1987 and as political editor from 1987 to 2001. Earlier in his career, he became Sweden's youngest editor-in-chief when he took over Nya Norrland in 1974, at the age of 26.

== Early life ==
Alsing was born in Värmland in 1948. He grew up in the Norrstrand district of Karlstad.

== Career ==
Alsing worked as editor-in-chief of Nya Norrland in Ångermanland. He later worked as editorial manager at Stockholms-Tidningen and Värmlands Folkblad. From 1985 to 1987 he was editor-in-chief of Aftonbladet, after which he served as the newspaper's political editor until 2001.

In 2008, Alsing became communications director at Karlstad University, a post he left in 2009.

== Writings ==
Alongside his journalism, Alsing wrote books on media, politics and literature. His works included Prästunge och maskrosboll (2003), about writer Göran Tunström; Aftonbladet inifrån (2005), a book on the history of Aftonbladet; Tage Erlander (2010), published in the series Sveriges statsministrar under 100 år; and Fröding och kvinnorna (2011), about Gustaf Fröding.

== Personal life and death ==
Alsing died on 7 April 2026, at the age of 78. He was the father of television and radio presenter Adam Alsing.

== Bibliography ==
- Prästunge och maskrosboll (2003)
- Aftonbladet inifrån (2005)
- Tage Erlander (2010)
- Fröding och kvinnorna (2011)
