= Flickorna Lundgren =

Café in Sweden

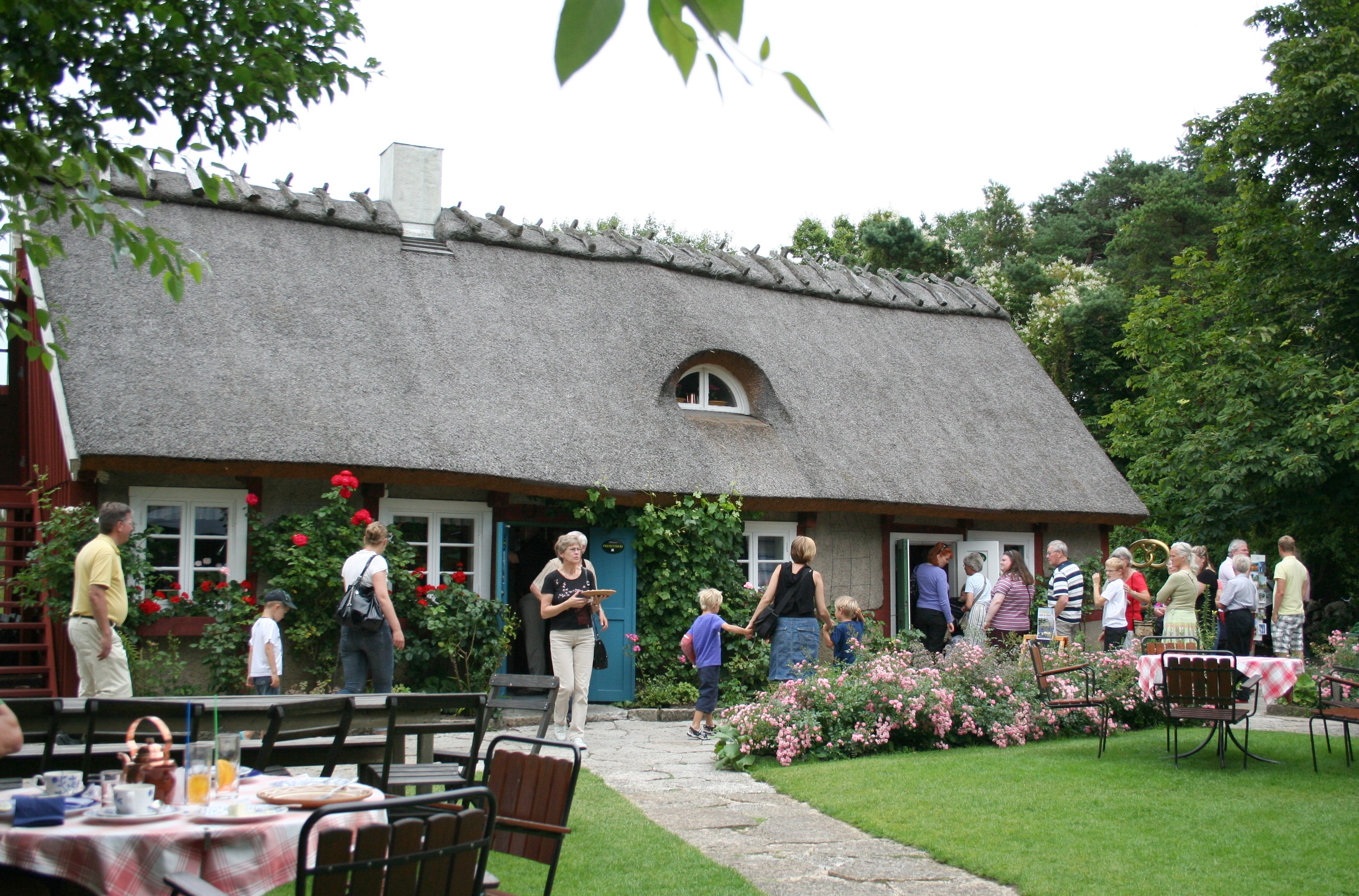
- The old fisher's cottage is one of the central buildings.
- Trade name: Flickorna Lundgren på Skäret (FLpS)
- Formerly: Systrarna på Skäret (The Sisters at Skäret*) Lundgrens kaffestuga (Lundgren's Coffeehouse)
- Type: Private limited company
- Industry: Café
- Founded: 1938; 88 years ago
- Founders: Greta, Anna, Ebba, Marta, Rut, Britt-Marie and Ella Lundgren
- Headquarters: Skäret, Sweden
- Number of locations: 1 café (2017)
- Key people: Mats Fejne; Chairman and CEO
- Revenue: ▲9.76 million SEK (2017)
- Operating income: ▲92 thousands (2017)
- Net income: ▲39 thousands (2017)
- Total assets: ▲1.98 million SEK (2017)
- Total equity: ▲110 thousands (2017)
- Number of employees: 12 (2017)
- Website: FlickornaLundgren.se
- Footnotes; Figures from the 2017 financial statements * Note that while Skäret is a small village, it can also be translated as "the skerry".

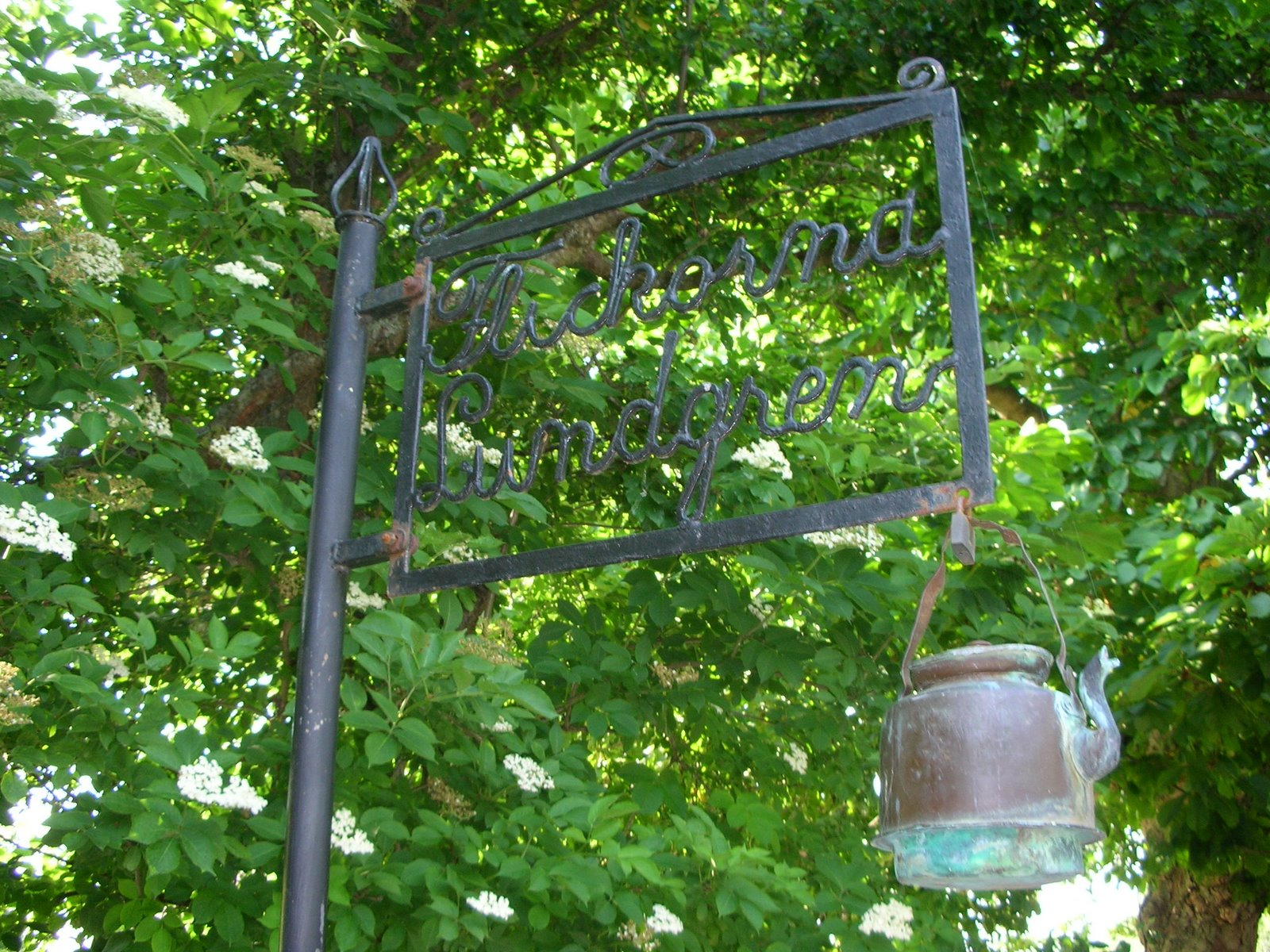
The well known sign that one of the processes would be about.

Flickorna Lundgren (English: The Lundgren Girls) is a café and restaurant that was started in 1938 by the sisters Greta, Anna, Ebba, Marta, Rut, Britt-Marie, and Ella Lundgren. Flickorna Lundgren lies in Skäret between Arild and Jonstorp in Höganäs municipality, Sweden. Several famous guest have visited the café through the years, with the most famous, king Gustaf VI Adolf, who was a regular between 1945 and 1973. The business have received Gastronomiska akademien's diplom. In 2014, they received White Guide's award "Worth a journey".

== History ==
In 1927, Alexander and Anna Lundgren bought a timber framed fisher's cot built 1732 in Skäret. They were farmers from Allerum and renovated the cottage to turn it into a holiday home for the family. During the difficult 1930s, in order to keep the summer cottage, the oldest sister Greta opened the café. She got help from Rut, who was a baker's apprentice, and the younger sisters. The business expanded quickly and in 1939 they built a separate bakery. Tragically Ebba succumbed to tuberculosis and died in 1939.

Crown-prince, and later king, Gustav Adolf visited Flickorna Lundgren the first time in 1945 during an excursion to watch the solar eclipse. He would then visit the café several times per year during his lifetime, and sometimes bring shoots and plants in exchange for a box of vanilla hearts.

Disagreements between the sister eventually led to two of them, Greta and Rut, leaving the business. The eventual trial went through several processes where Greta lost.

At the start of the 1960s, there were only three sisters left in the business; Marta, Britt-Marie, and Ella. The increased access to cars during the 1960s increased the number of customers, and articles in the weekly press made the café famous throughout Sweden and Denmark.

They operated the café until 1988 when Ella's oldest son Mats Fejne took over.

== After 1988 ==
Ella Lundgren's grandson Mats Fejne took over the business in 1988, and would soon also be joined by his wife Anki Fejne. One of the first changes Mats and Anki made was to open the coffeehouse for a few weeks in December and sell baskets with Christmas cookies to companies. In 1995, they built a greenhouse so that they would be able to receive customers even during rainy days. The greenhouse was built with a hundred seats; lots of flowers and greenery such olive, ficus, and peach trees; and with a pond in the foreground. Two chestnut trees was planted to mark where the new part begun, mirroring the chestnuts that have stood by the entrance since the opening. In 2004, the old cottage kitchen was no longer sufficient and a new was built in connection with the greenhouse. Mats's wife and business partner Anki died from cancer in 2008. In conjunction with the 75th anniversary, 2013, the kitchen was expanded too cook food made from local ingredients. The menu would change daily and include some of Anna Lundgren's old recipes, such as Äggakaka and Claypot Herring.

== Rut på Skäret ==
One of the sisters, Rut, left the café and started a pottery business close to it. With time the pottery would develop into the restaurant Rut på Skäret. Rut died in 1980.
