= Lap Power =

Lap Power were a Swedish publicly listed company that was started in 1991 that during the 1990s sold (mainly portable) personal computers and computer accessories. A lot of attention and controversy came from provocative advertising featuring Helen Wellton posing scantily clad to sell their computers. The company was owned by Mr and Mrs Helen Wellton (b.1961) and Claes Wellton Persson. Lap Power's new owners plunged the company into bankruptcy in 2000.

== JämO against Helen Wellton ==
Company ads where Helen Wellton occurred frequently on the picture together with the company's products attracted the Equality Ombudsman's (JämO) attention. The ads were reported twice by the Ombudsman to the Industry and Commerce Ethics against sexist advertising (ERK). The first time she was freed. The second time, she was convicted of her smile, which ERK considered "signaling sexual overtures".

== History ==
The corner stones for Lap Power were done in mid-1990s but it wasn't until 1991 that it started for real. The first big order came from the Swedish Armed Forces. That ordered a number of camouflage painted "towable" computers. It could best be described as a stationary machine that had been assembled together with a foldable screen. These clumsy models became little of a specialty for the company in the beginning and the possibilities were soon realised.

My thought was that in the feature all one would need was a small portable computer and no stationary. I was the first in the world to market a package that consisted of a portable computer, a big monitor, big keyboard and a mouse for office workplaces, says Claes Persson (the former CEO).

Persson also says he was the first with a docking strip that fit portable computers. In the docking strip, screen, keyboard and mouse were always connected. Too bad I didn't patent this.
