= Annette Kullenberg =

Swedish writer and journalist (1939–2021)

- Born: Elsa Caroline Borgström; 9 January 1939; Stockholm, Sweden
- Died: 28 January 2021 (aged 82); Cascais, Portugal
- Occupations: Journalist, author

Elsa Caroline Annette Kullenberg (née Borgström; 9 January 1939 – 28 January 2021) was a Swedish journalist and author.

== Biography ==
Kullenberg was born in Stockholm. She studied philosophy at Uppsala University, and started working as a journalist in the early 1960s. She worked at Aftonbladet for 25 years and quit in 2002 after a conflict with the editor-in-chief Anders Gerdin regarding the content of a column about Princess Madeleine of Sweden. The conflict started when Gerdin, without informing Kullenberg, modified the content of the column, downplaying the princess' problematic alcohol consumption. Moreover, Kullenberg served as a foreign correspondent stationed in Buenos Aires and Barcelona for six years. She was also the chairman of the Swedish publicist club between 1994 and 1997.

Kullenberg's first novel was Vänd på dig (published in 1967), and her second book, Överklassen i Sverige, was released in 1974, followed by Urp! sa överklassen in 1995. She also worked as a dramatist with a dozen radio and television plays to her credit.

Since 2009, Kullenberg wrote columns for Expressen.

Kullenberg died on 28 January 2021, at the age of 82, after contracting COVID-19, in Hospital de Cascais in Portugal, during the COVID-19 pandemic in Portugal. Her brother Claes Borgström died from the same disease in Stockholm on 15 May 2020.

== Bibliography ==
- Vänd på dig, novel (1967) ISBN 9789173899864
- Pappa mamma barn, novel (1968) ISBN 9789173899796
- Vad ska vi med teater? (1969) ISBN 9789173899970
- Gunnar Karlsson reser västerut (1970) ISBN 9789173899857
- Överklassen i Sverige (1974) ISBN 9789173899901
- Kärleksbrev till en amerikan (1976) ISBN 9789173899956
- Kvinnohatare – jag? och andra sensationella reportage (1978) ISBN 9789173899840
- Sångfågeln från Milano (1989)
- Vi som gör jobbet: en bok om IUL i Latinamerika (1990)
- Viva! följ med till Spanien 92!: boken om årets land (1992)
- Diamanten som log i skymningen, novel (1993)
- Urp! sa överklassen: eliten i Sverige (1995)
- Palme och kvinnorna (1996)
- Annette-kolumner (1996)
- Strindberg – murveln: en bok om journalisten August Strindberg (1997)
- Mannen som älskade boaormar och andra bagateller (1998) ISBN 9789173899819
- Glöd, novel (2000)
- Lana Turner drack alltid kaffe i mitt kök, novel (2001)
- Annette på sista sidan (2001)
- Den enödge älskaren, novel (2003) ISBN 9789173899529
- Censurerad (2004)
- Jag var självlockig, moderlös, gripande och ett monster av förljugenhet : en biografi om Marianne Höök (2008)
