= Cattelin =

Former restaurant in Stockholm, Sweden

Coordinates: 59°19′32.4″N 18°4′4.6″E

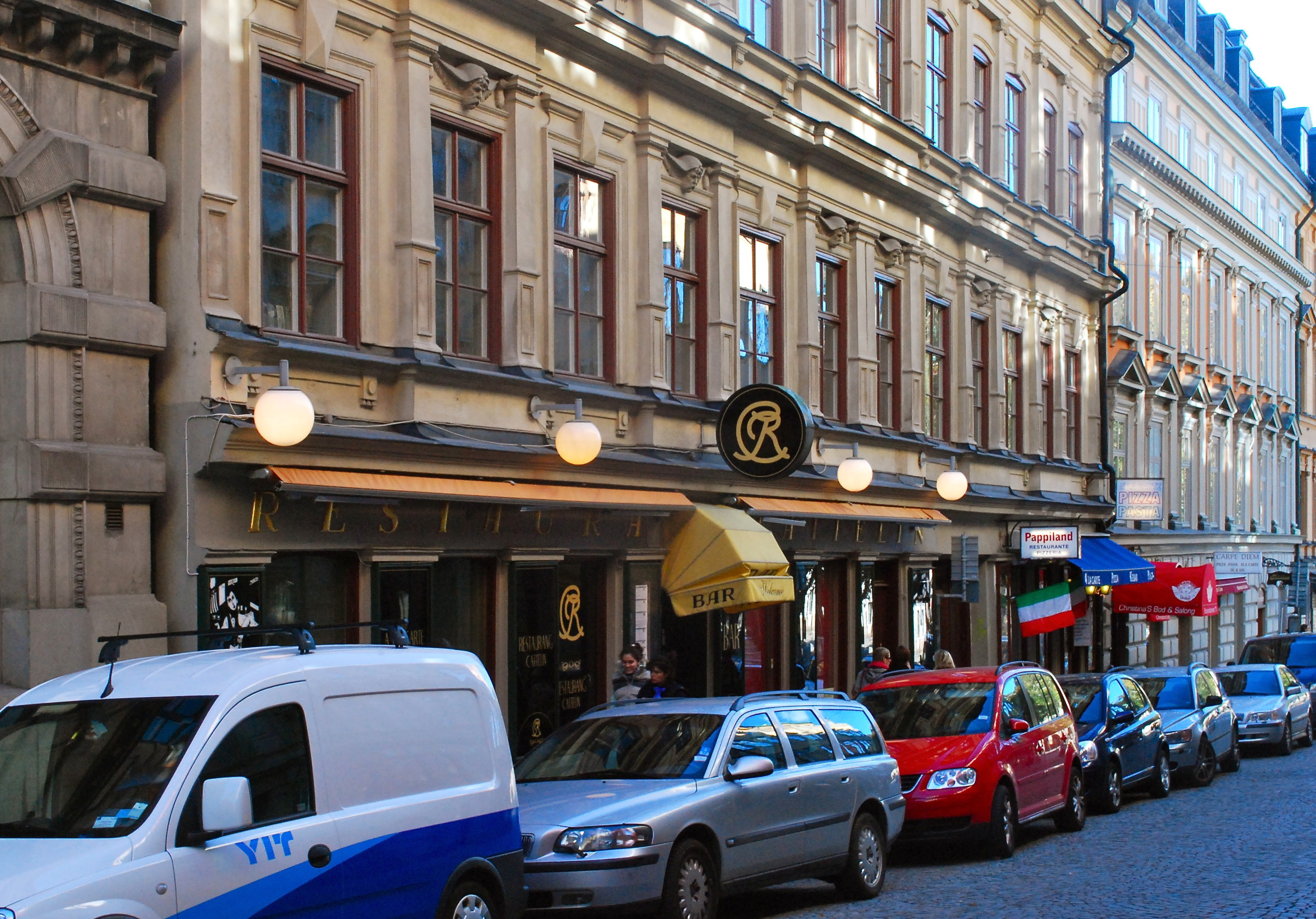
Cattelin in 2010

Catellin was a landmark restaurant in Stockholm, Sweden. It was situated at Storkyrkobrinken 9 in the old, original part of the city, Gamla stan. It closed in 2011.

== History ==
Catellin was founded in 1922 by Franco-Belgian chef Jules Claude Catellin, although according to other sources the restaurant opened in 1924. The walls of the restaurant were decorated by artist Axel Hörlin in 1926. The restaurant was popular among artists, writers and politicians, some of them were Isaac Grünewald, Lennart Jirlow, Einar Jolin, Olle Olsson-Hagalund, and Stig Dagerman. 20 years after opening the restaurant, Catellin decided to sell it to Harry Uhr and Kjell Blekenberg. The new owners changed the classic French cuisine approach of the restaurant and brought new preparations and flavors to the menu.

The restaurant closed in 2011. The lease for the restaurant was terminated since the whole block was going to be renovated and used for other functions. As of 2019, the premises and most of the block are used by Sveriges Riksdag.

== Legacy ==
In 1978, a book with recipes from the restaurant was published. Many of the dishes are based on meat or fish. The most noted dishes are the garlic-flavored squid salad and the Oxfilé Provençale.

== In popular culture ==
The restaurant appears in Stieg Trenter's 1944 novel Dangerous Vanity.
