= Equality Ombudsman =

Swedish government agency

The Equality Ombudsman (Swedish: Diskrimineringsombudsmannen, lit. 'discrimination ombudsman', DO; formerly Jämställdhetsombudsmannen, 'equality ombudsman', JämO) is a government agency in Sweden tasked with supervising the laws relating to discrimination on the basis of someone's sex, transgender identity or expression, ethnicity, religion or other belief, disability, sexual orientation or age. It was formed on 1 January 2009 from the four previously separate ombudsmen tasked with different aspects of discrimination.

== History ==
The term ombudsman refers to the office with staff, as well as being the title of its government-appointed acting head. Its main task was to monitor the function and adherence to four laws that regulated gender equality: the Equality Act, the Equal Treatment of University Students Act, the law prohibiting discrimination and other degrading treatment of children and pupils, and as of 1 July 2005, also the law prohibiting gender discrimination.

JämO also worked to increase awareness of the four laws through information and advocacy, and to promote equality in workplaces, colleges, schools, employment training, training institutions, as well as several other areas of society. In 2006 the government's budget for the authority was 27.9 million SEK.

The JämO between 2000 and 2007 was Claes Borgström, who left in order to start a law firm with former Minister for Justice Thomas Bodström. Prosecutor Anne-Marie Bergström was appointed on 16 August 2007 to succeed Borgström. She kept the post until the four discrimination ombudsmen were merged into one agency on 1 January 2009. Former Ombudsman against Ethnic Discrimination Katri Linna was the first head of the new authority. Following strong criticism from several quarters, the Government decided on 1 February 2011 to transfer Katri Linna to a post within the Government Office. On 23 June 2011, the government appointed Agneta Broberg as DO.

== JämOs/DOs since founding ==
=== Prior to the agency merger ===
- Inga-Britt Törnell, 1980–1987
- Gun Neuman, 1987–1994
- Lena Svenaeus, 1994–2000
- Claes Borgström, 2000–2007
- Anne-Marie Bergström, 2007–2009

=== Following the agency merger ===
- Katri Linna, 2009–2011
- Agneta Broberg, 2011–2020
- Lars Arrhenius, 2020–

== See also ==
- Lap Power
