= Anthony van den Pol =

American neurosurgeon (1949–2020)

Anthony N. van den Pol (1949 – 28 October 2020) was Professor of Neurosurgery at Yale University. van den Pol received his PhD from Yale in 1977 and did postdoctoral work at Oxford University, Semmelweis University, and Stanford University. He did research in neuropharmacology, neuroanatomy, and neurophysiology, seeking to understand the basic cellular mechanisms of the normal and diseased brain, and thereby find the treatments of brain disorders.

He won the Charles Ohse Research Award and the International Research Exchange Organization Award. van den Pol worked on a technique to kill brain tumors using genetically modified viruses, such as vesicular stomatitis virus. He also worked on the pleasure circuits underlying sweets.
