= Tomas Oneborg =

Swedish photographer (1958–2020)

- Born: March 28, 1958; Hägersten, Sweden
- Died: March 29, 2020 (aged 62); Stockholm, Sweden

Tomas Krister Oneborg (28 March 1958 – 29 March 2020) was a Swedish photographer.

== Biography ==
Oneborg was born in Hägersten outside Stockholm and was employed as a press photographer at Svenska Dagbladet from 1986 until his death. His photos of the aftermath of the 2017 Stockholm truck attack, which left five people dead, were awarded a second place prize at Photo of the Year.

Oneborg died at his home in Stockholm on 29 March 2020 of COVID-19.
