= Jim Frick =

Swedish horse harness racer (1951–2020)

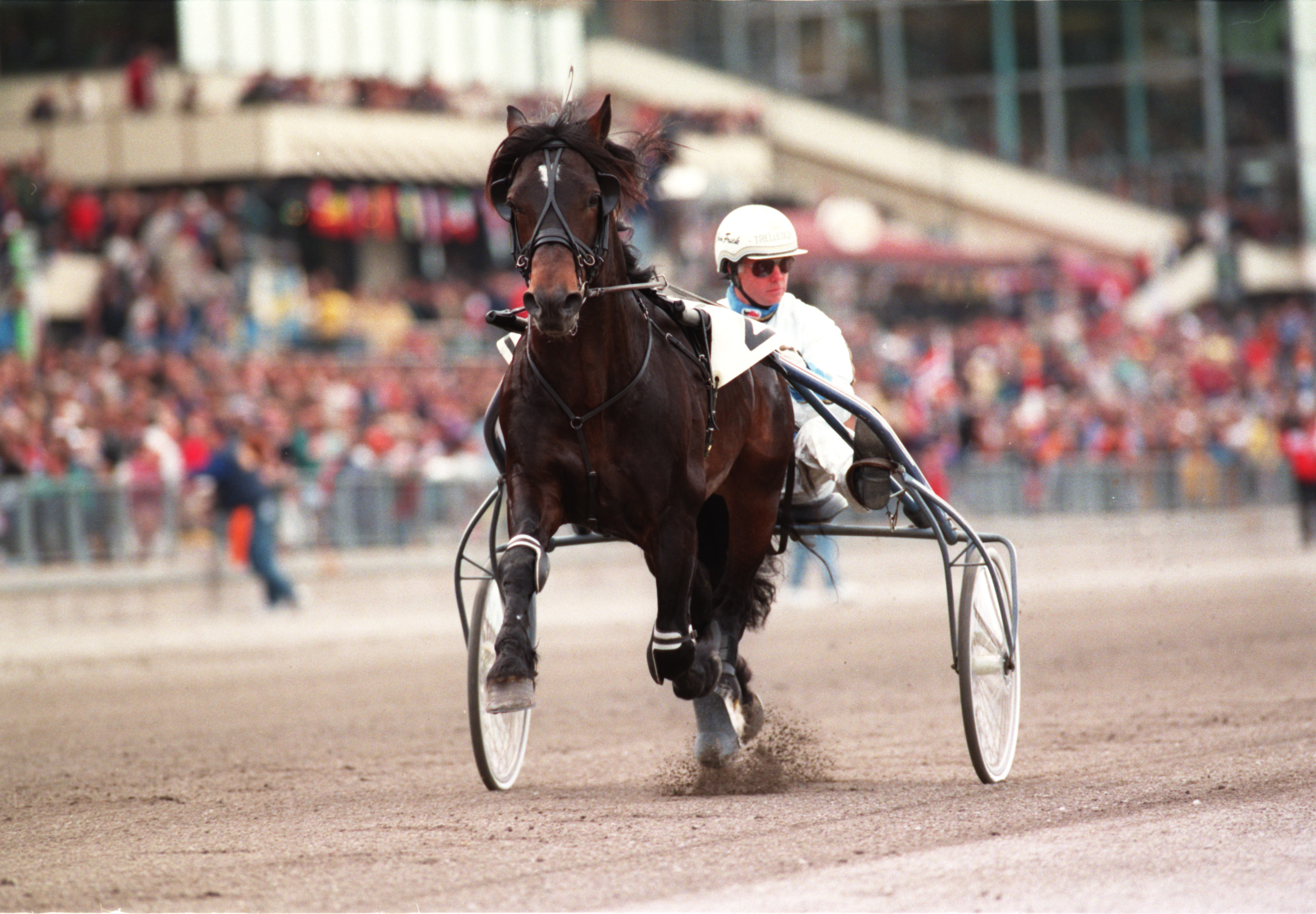
Jim Frick in 1997

Kjell Jim Erik Frick (6 November 1951 – 25 July 2020) was a Swedish horse racer within harness racing. After winning 5002 races he ended his career in 2010 after being thrown off the sulky and becoming unconscious. He ended his career officially on 13 October 2010. Frick was born in Rättvik. In 1987, he represented Sweden in the World Driving Championship.

Between 2003 and 2007, he won 36 million (SEK) with 400 victories in the sport. On 21 February 2010, he won his 5000th victory in horse racing with the horse Sandro Mustang at Gävletravet.

Frick died on 25 July 2020, after suffering from prostate cancer.
