= Anna Mohr =

Swedish archeologist and activist (1944–2020)

- Born: 10 July 1944; Stockholm, Sweden
- Died: 4 May 2020 (aged 75); Stockholm, Sweden
- Occupations: Archaeologist, activist

Anna Mohr (10 July 1944 – 4 May 2020) was a Swedish archaeologist and LGBT+ activist. In January 1995, she and her partner Britt Dahlgren were the first lesbian couple to enter in a civil union in Sweden.

She was formerly the chair of EKHO, and worked with RFSL's Health & HIV group for 20 years. She was one of the activists behind Frigörelsedagen ('liberation day') in Stockholm in the 1970s. The movement eventually grew into Stockholm Pride.

In May 2020, she died from COVID-19 during the COVID-19 pandemic in Sweden.
