= Adam Live =

Swedish television talk show

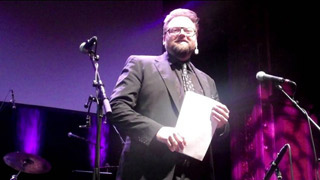
The host of talkshow, Adam Alsing.

#AdamLive is a Swedish talk show presented by Adam Alsing which began broadcasting on 5 September 2011 on TV3. The program is a newer version of Alsing's former talk show Adam which was broadcast on TV3 between 1993 and 1997. Co-hosts in the program's first season are Carin da Silva and Daniel Breitholtz.
