= Ivar Genesjö =

Swedish fencer (1931–2020)

Personal information
- Born: 24 January 1931 Kronoberg, Sweden
- Died: 15 July 2020 (aged 89)

Sport
- Sport: Fencing

Ivar Genesjö (24 January 1931 – 15 July 2020) was a Swedish fencer. He competed in the team épée event at the 1964 Summer Olympics.
