= Sune Wehlin =

Swedish modern pentathlete (1923–2020)

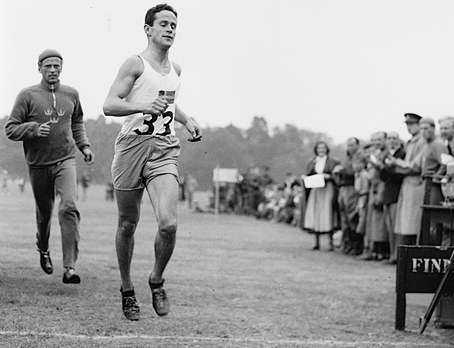

Personal information
- Full name: Karl Sune Wehlin
- Born: 12 January 1923 Stockholm, Sweden
- Died: 21 September 2020 (aged 97)

Sport
- Sport: Modern pentathlon

Karl Sune Wehlin (12 January 1923 – 21 September 2020) was a Swedish modern pentathlete. He competed at the 1948 Summer Olympics.
