= Gunnar Seijbold =

Swedish photographer (1955–2020)

- Born: 25 January 1955; Stockholm, Sweden
- Died: 25 April 2020 (aged 65); Stockholm, Sweden
- Occupation(s): Photographer, musician

Gunnar Seijbold (25 January 1955 – 25 April 2020) was a Swedish freelance press photographer and musician. During his career he worked for several newspapers, including Expressen, Dagens Nyheter, and Aftonbladet. He also worked in the capacity of photographer for the Swedish government and worked as the official European Union photographer. During his career, Seijbold met and photographed U.S. President Barack Obama.

== Early life ==
Seijbold was born and raised in Stockholm. His father, Olle Seijbold, was also a photographer who took photos of the Swedish extradition of Baltic soldiers in 1945.

== Career ==
During his career, Seijbold worked for several newspapers including Expressen, Dagens Nyheter and Aftonbladet.

Seijbold was the Swedish Government's official photographer, and followed Prime Minister Fredrik Reinfeldt on his visit to meet American president Barack Obama in the White House in 2009. He was also the official European Union photographer during Sweden's leadership period of the union in 2009. In this capacity, he provided photographs from official meetings and work to the world press.

Seijbold founded the photographic company Svenska Bild, along with Andreas Hassellöf, Gustav Mårtensson, and Lars G. Öhlund. He served as the company's CEO.

Seijbold was also a musician, and he performed as a bass player on the Eddie Meduza album För Jaevle Braa! in 1982.

== Death ==
Seijbold died on 25 April 2020, after suffering from COVID-19 during the COVID-19 pandemic in Sweden. He had been ill for a month and spent the last week in hospital.
