= Lars Idermark =

Swedish businessman (1957–2020)

- Born: 1957
- Position held: chief executive officer (2013–)

Lars Nils-Johan Idermark (born 1957 in Högsby, Sweden - 13 September 2020) was the president and CEO of PostNord from 2010 to 2013. Idermark had a Master of Business Administration (MBA) from Uppsala University, and was previously chairman of the Swedish bank Swedbank, president and CEO of Kooperativa Förbundet, owner of the Swedish retailer Coop Dagligvaruhandel. Idermark also worked as chairman of the Coop-owned MedMera Bank, and prior to being president at Kooperative Förbundet, he was CEO of the Swedish pension fund Andra AP-Fonden.

On December 11, 2012 it was announced that Lars Idermark would leave his post as CEO of Postnord AB to become CEO of the forestry co-operative Södra.

Idermark lived in Växjö with wife and two teenage children. His spare time was spent on the family ancestral farm north of Kalmar, where Lars Idermark grew up as fifth generation of the family. One of Idermark's passions was hunting.

Idermark died on the 13th of September 2020 after a period of illness.
