= Stundande natten =

Book by Carl-Henning Wijkmark

- First edition
- Author: Carl-Henning Wijkmark
- Cover artist: Peter Lloyd
- Language: Swedish
- Published: 2007
- Publisher: Norstedts förlag
- Publication place: Sweden
- Awards: August Prize of 2007

Stundande natten (lit. Night Approaching) is a 2007 novel by Swedish author Carl-Henning Wijkmark. It won the August Prize in 2007.
