= Stallmästaregården =

Building in Solna Municipality, Stockholm County, Sweden

Coordinates: 59°21′06″N 18°02′36″E

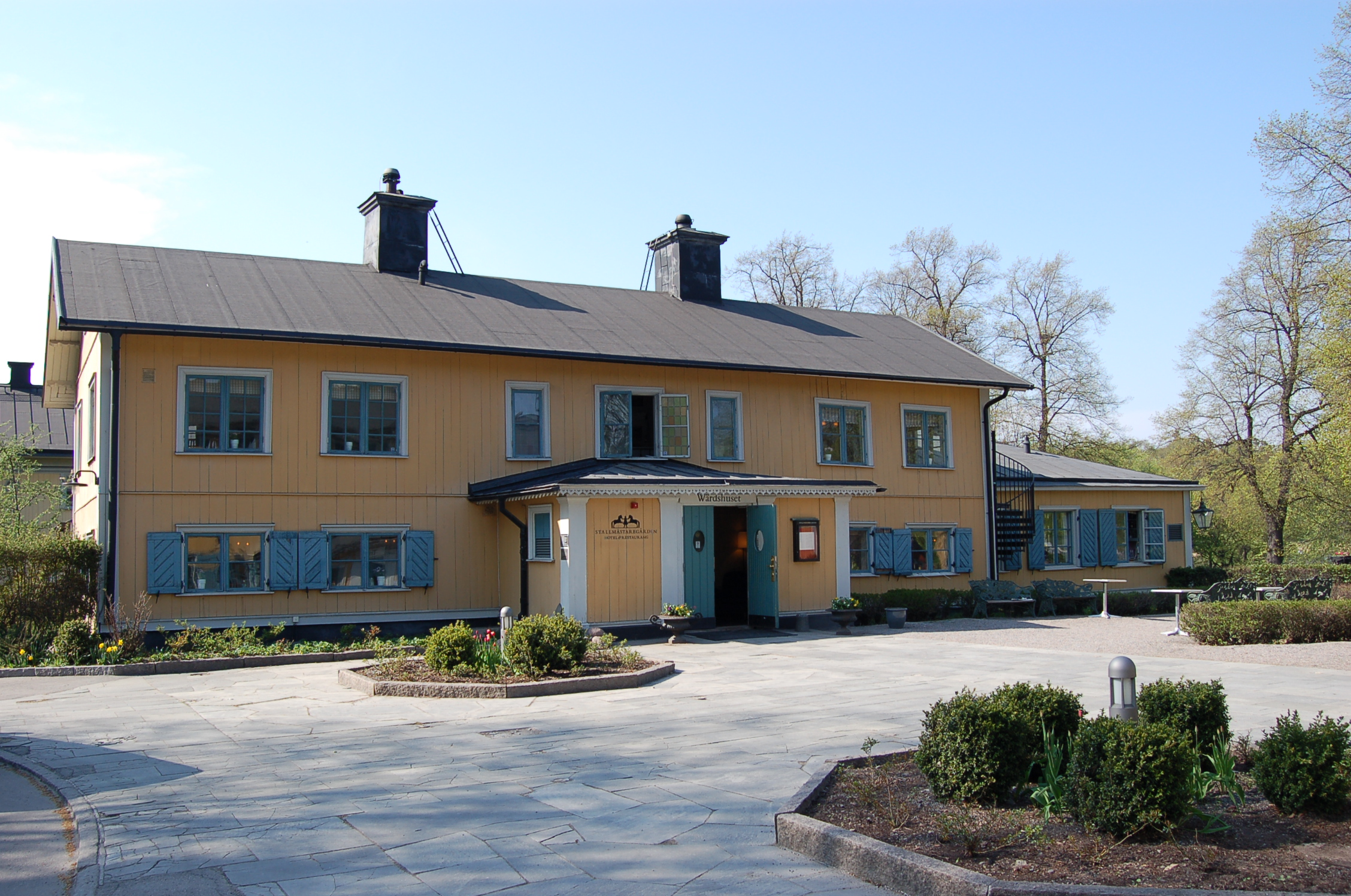
Stallmästaregården

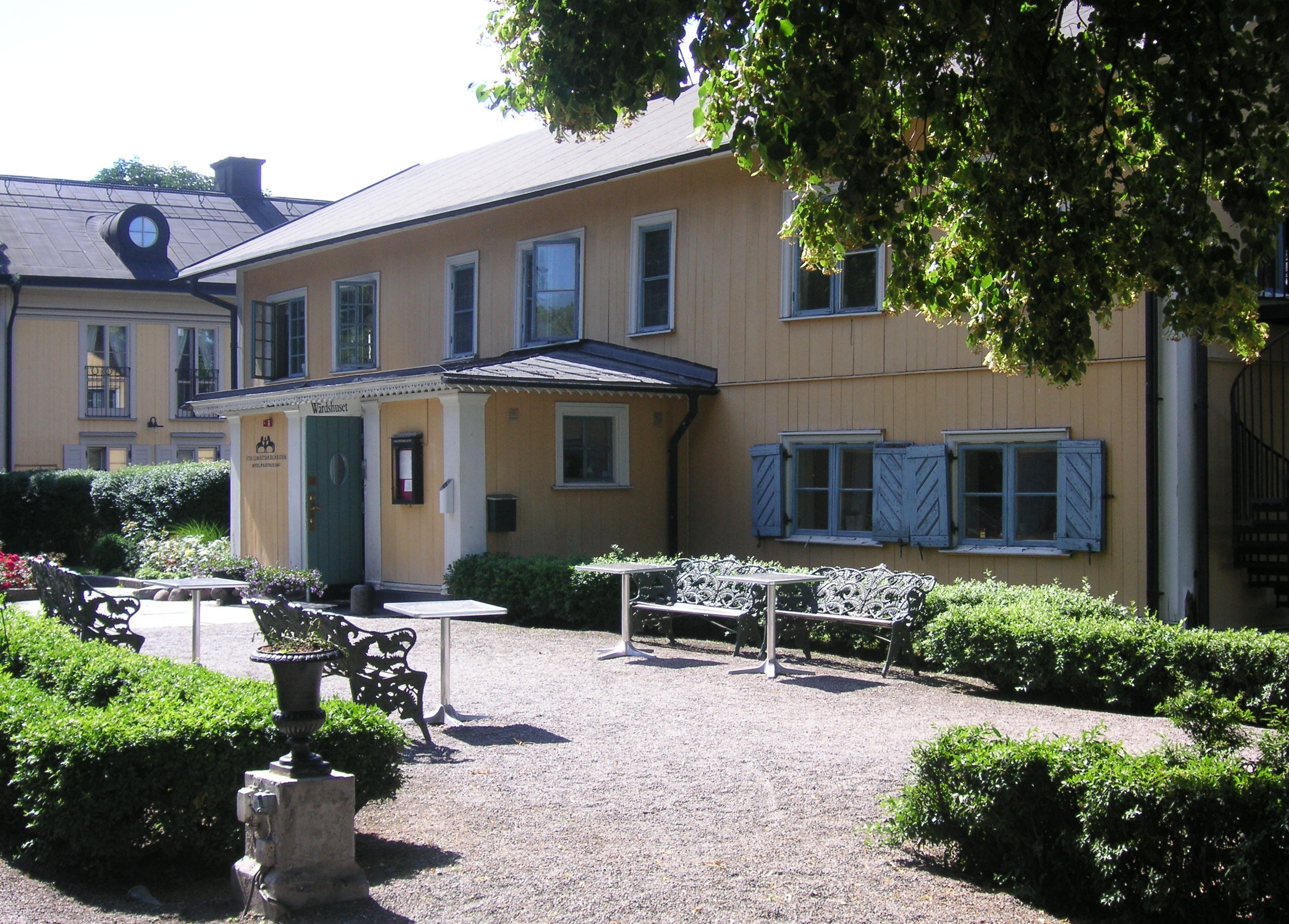
Stallmästaregården

Stallmästaregården (or Stallmästargården) is a historic inn adjacent to the park around the Royal Pavilion at Haga in Solna, just north of the city limits of Stockholm, Sweden. Today, Stallmästaregården is a restaurant with hotel operation.

== History ==
Stallmästaregården is the oldest remaining hostel in the Stockholm area with the same function since the mid-17th century. The farm existed since the 17th century, when the first house here was built by Ebbe Håkansson, who decided to open an inn. That building was demolished around 1700 and replaced by a new building, which is today the main building of the inn. Despite many changes, the former farm has retained its typical 18th-century character. The site was mentioned numerous times in the works of August Strindberg.

In 1840, the business was taken over by Pierre Bichard, once a cook for King Karl XIV Johan and a restaurateur on Hasselbacken. The enormously popular horse races during the winter at Brunnsviken also began during this time. 1884-1906, Södra Roslag's court saga held things in a banquet hall added to the eastern building in 1815 until they got their own house at Hagaparken.

The western building was expanded in the 1920s when a one-storey dining room, the so-called Hagapaviljongen, was built towards Brunnsviken according to Carl Åkerblad's drawings.

In the years 1882–1893, Stallmästaregården had its own railway stop with this name. It was located between the Norrtull and Albano stations on the Karlberg – Värtan SJ line.

== Other sources ==
- Gunnar Brusewitz (1969) Stockholm staden på landet (Stockholm: Wahlström & Widstrand förlag) ISBN 9146101772
