= Erland Brand =

Swedish painter (1922–2020)

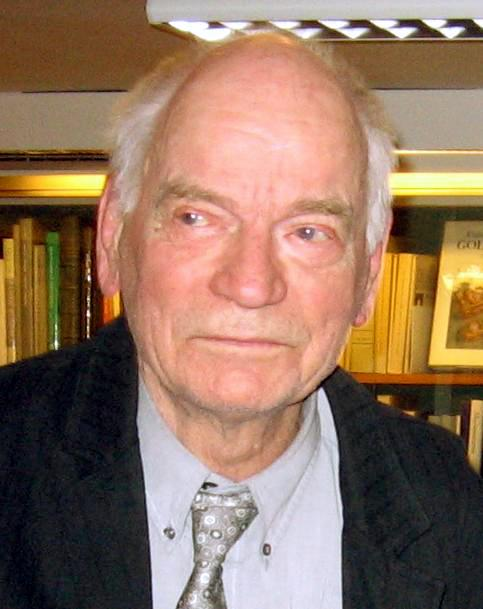
- Brand in Stockholm in 2009
- Born: 5 October 1922; Arvika, Sweden
- Died: 17 October 2020 (aged 98); Gothenburg, Sweden
- Occupation: Artist
- Years active: 1948–2020
- Spouse: Inga Brorson

Erland Peter Brand (5 October 1922 – 17 October 2020) was a Swedish painter, draftsman and printmaker. He lived and worked in Gothenburg.

== Biography ==
Brand was born in Arvika and educated at Valand Art School in Gothenburg, where he also worked as a teacher for three years. He exhibited at a variety of institutions around Sweden, such as Galerie Blanche, Stockholm in 1958, Prince Eugene's Waldemarsudde 1985/86, Gothenburg Art Museum 1995 Rackstadmuseet, Arvika 1999 at Moderna Museet, Stockholm 2000. He had a guaranteed income for life of at least five base amounts (about 214 000 SEK in 2009) per annum from the Swedish government through its income guarantee for artists.

Brand was the son of house painter Johan Brand (1883–1955) and Ester Matilda Brand née Pettersson (1895–1994). His wife was Inga Brand née Brorson, also an artist with whom he had a son and a daughter. He died in Gothenburg.
