= Claes Borgström =

Swedish lawyer and politician (1944–2020)

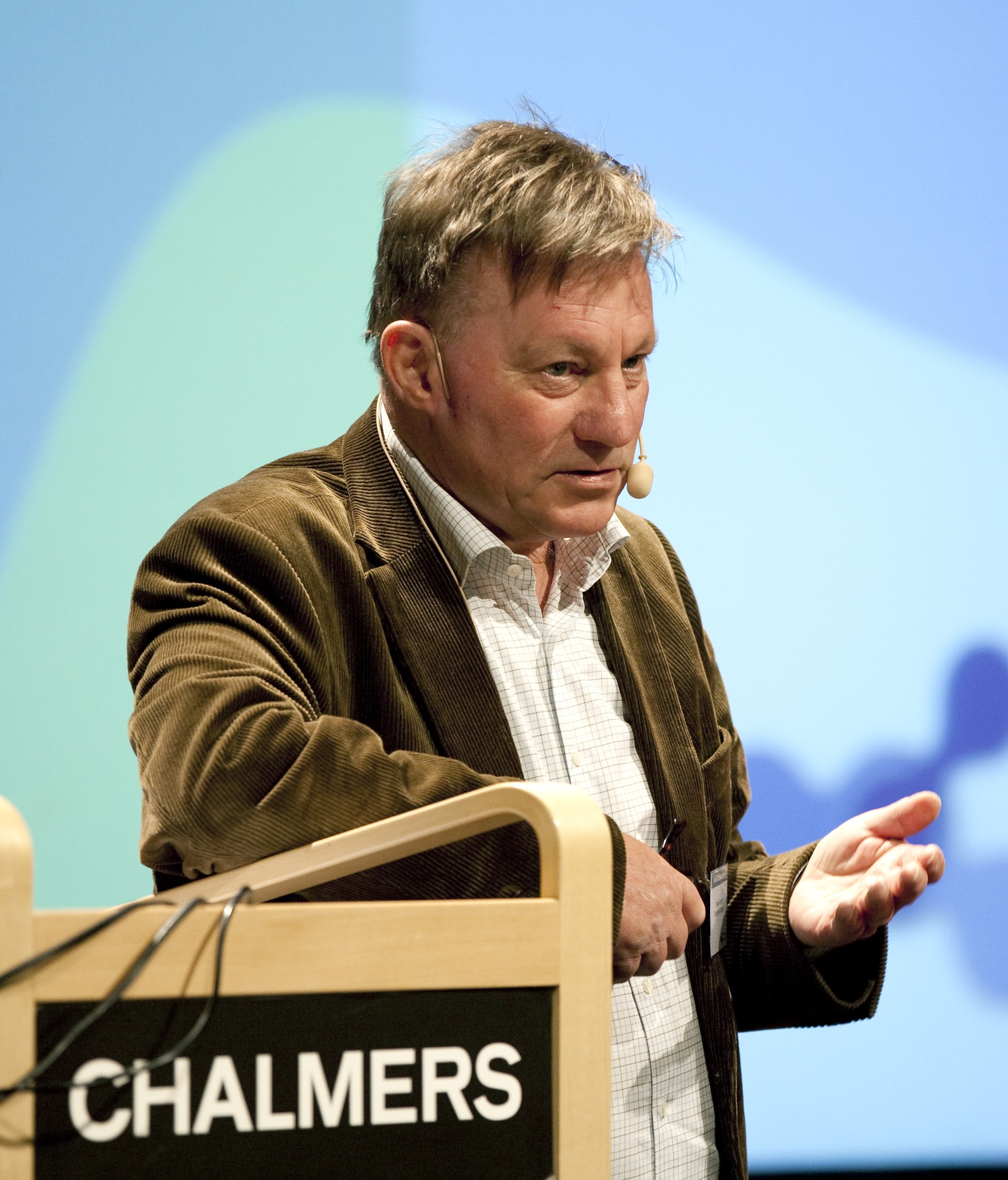

Equality Ombudsman
- In office 2000–2007

Personal details
- Born: Claes Gustaf Borgström; 21 July 1944; Stockholm, Sweden
- Died: 15 May 2020 (aged 75); Stockholm, Sweden
- Party: Social Democrats (until 2013); Left Party (2013–2020)
- Relations: Annette Kullenberg (sister); Kerstin Vinterhed (sister)
- Parent: Gustaf Borgström (father)
- Education: Stockholm University (juris kandidat, 1974)
- Profession: Advokat

Claes Gustaf Borgström (21 July 1944 – 15 May 2020) was a Swedish lawyer and politician. He served as Equality Ombudsman (JämO) from 2000 until 2007. A member of the Social Democratic Party prior to 2013, he joined the Left Party in that year.

== Education ==
Borgström earned a law degree (juris kandidat) from Stockholm University in 1974.

== Career ==
After earning his law degree, Borgström began working as a lawyer, taking several high-profile criminal cases. Between 2000 and 2007, Borgström served the Swedish government as Equality Ombudsman (JämO). Borgström expressed his dislike of this job to his client Sture Bergwall. He described the job as boring, and he would not stay for the full tenancy.

After the defeat of the Social Democrats in the 2006 election, Borgström resigned to start a law firm together with former Social Democratic Minister of Justice Thomas Bodström. Borgström himself had plans of becoming the Minister of Justice if the Social Democrats had won the election in 2010, according to his client Sture Bergwall. According to Bergwall, Borgström was quoted as saying of Bodström: "I have no high thoughts of Thomas Bodström. It is actually unimaginable how the current Minister of Justice was chosen for his post. He is a shallow person."

From 2008, Borgström was the Swedish Social Democratic Party's spokesperson on questions regarding gender equality.

In a 2004 interview, Borgström stated that men carry a collective responsibility for violence against women, but emphasized the difference between collective responsibility and collective guilt. In this context, he voiced certain support for Gudrun Schyman's proposal of a "male tax" to pay for the costs of violence against women and other issues regarding gender equality. He attracted attention in March 2006, when he demanded that Sweden boycott the 2006 FIFA World Cup in Germany "in protest against the increase in the trafficking of women that the event is expected to result in".

In 2010, Borgström successfully appealed the decision to close the sexual assault case against WikiLeaks founder Julian Assange, and became the legal representative of the two Swedish women against whom the Swedish police have accused Assange of sexual misconduct. However, it seems the relationship soured, and he was replaced with Elisabeth Massi Fritz.

In 2013, citing his dissatisfaction with what he referred to as the right-leaning changes in the Social Democratic Party, Borgström left the Social Democrats and joined the Left Party.

== Personal life ==
Borgström was born in Stockholm. His father was Gustaf Borgström, CEO of Sveriges Köpmannaförbund ("Swedish Merchants' Association") from 1942 until 1957. Borgström is also the brother of journalists Annette Kullenberg and Kerstin Vinterhed. He married his former colleague, Märit Borgström (née Röger), in Mallorca in 2007. He had three children from an earlier marriage.

Borgström died in Stockholm on 15 May 2020, after developing COVID-19 during the COVID-19 pandemic in Sweden, aged 75.

Preceded by Lena Svenaeus	Swedish Equality Ombudsman; 2000–2007	Succeeded by Anne-Marie Bergström
