= Carl-Henning Wijkmark =

Swedish writer (1934–2020)

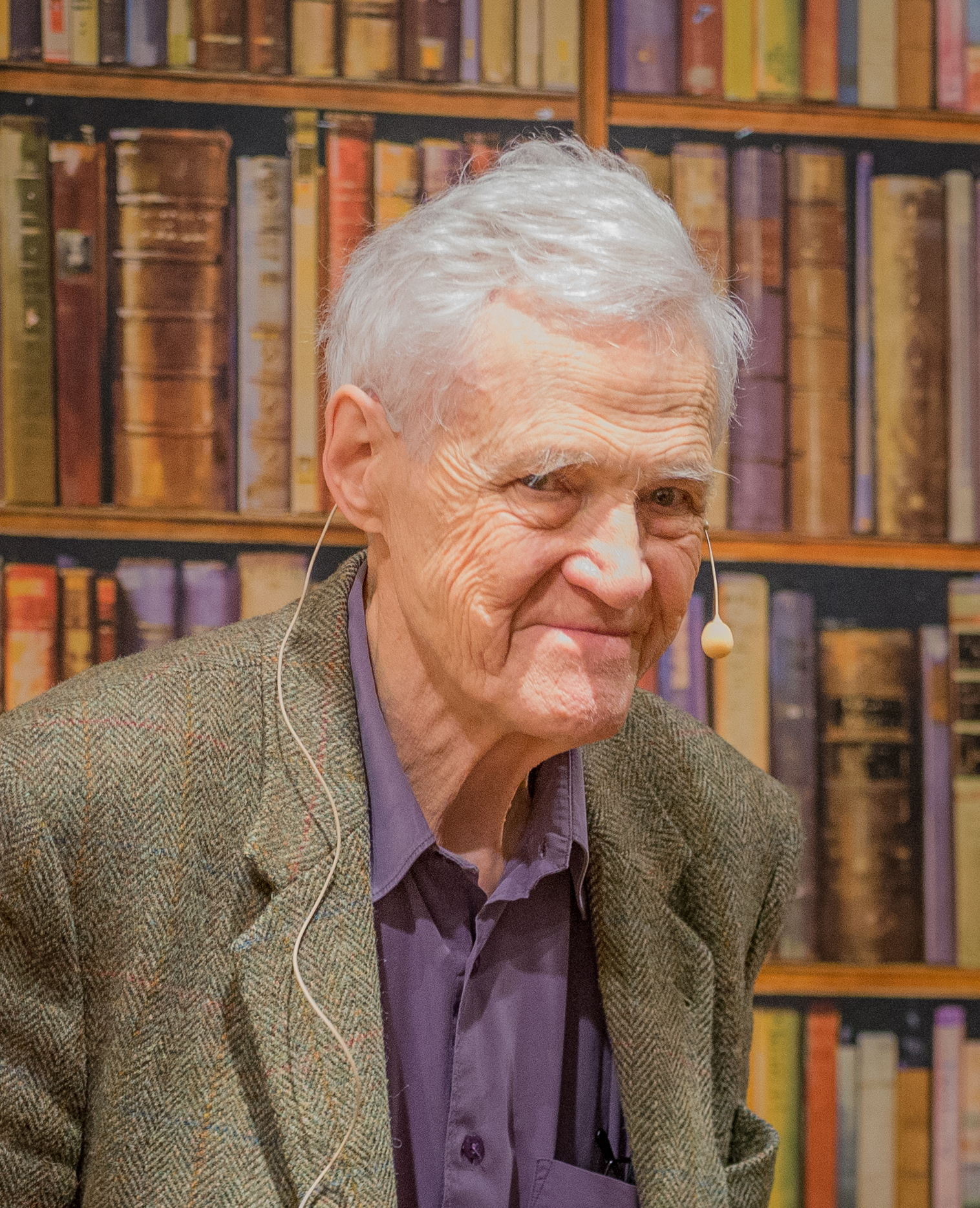
- Carl-Henning Wijkmark in 2014.
- Born: 21 November 1934; Stockholm, Sweden
- Died: 4 September 2020 (age 85)
- Occupations: Novelist and translator
- Awards: Dobloug Prize (1986); August Prize (2007)

Carl-Henning Wijkmark (21 November 1934 – 4 September 2020) was a Swedish novelist and translator. He made his literary debut in 1972, with the novel Jägarna på Karinhall. Among his other novels are Dressinen from 1983 and Sista dagar from 1986. He was awarded the Dobloug Prize in 1986. He received the August Prize in 2007, for his novel Stundande natten.
