= Olle Holmquist =

Swedish musician (1936–2020)

Background information
- Birth name: Bert Olav Holmquist
- Born: 15 November 1936; Skellefteå, Sweden
- Died: 26 March 2020 (aged 83)
- Genres: Jazz
- Occupation: Musician
- Instrument: Trombone

Bert Olav Holmquist (15 November 1936 – 26 March 2020) was a Swedish trombonist who was active in the European music scene since the 1960s. Holmquist was born in Skellefteå. A self-taught musician, he began his career in a Swedish armed forces band (I20). He began playing tuba, then switched to valve trombone, and then to slide trombone. As a freelance musician, he worked for the Swedish Radio big band in 1963 but continued to freelance throughout the 1960s. During this period, he often worked with Björn Ulvaeus and Benny Andersson, who were later members of ABBA. He also worked regularly with American musician Quincy Jones.

In 1971, Holmquist joined the Swiss Radio big band, and in 1976 he moved to Berlin as a member of the RIAS (Radio in the American Sector) big band. In 1978, he became a member of the James Last Orchestra, a position he held until 2013. He performed with Kai Warner, Freddy Quinn, Jerry Lewis, The Manhattan Transfer, and Lill Lindfors.

Holmquist died on 26 March 2020, after suffering from COVID-19 and Alzheimer's disease.
