= Kurt Liander =

Swedish footballer and manager (1932–2020)

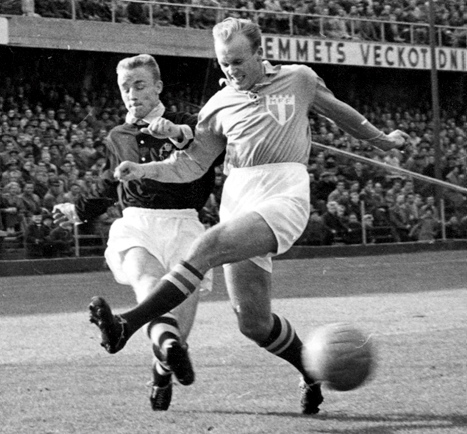
- Kurt Liander, Prawitz Öberg (1956)

Personal information
- Date of birth: 28 January 1932
- Place of birth: Stockholm, Sweden
- Date of death: 10 March 2020 (aged 88)
- Place of death: Stockholm
- Position: Winger

Youth career
- 1947: Lunda SK
- 1948: Rosendals IF

Senior career*
| Years | Team | Apps | (Gls) |
| 1949–1959 | AIK | 99 | (9) |
| 1960 | Råsunda IS | | |
| 1961–1968 | IFK Stockholm | | |
| 1969–1971 | BK Vargarna | | |

International career
| 1954–1958 | Sweden | 5 | (1) |

Managerial career
- 1967–1968: IFK Stockholm
- 1969–1972: BK Vargarna
- 1975: AIK
- 1976–1978: Täby IS
- 1980: Spårvägens GoIF
- 1982–1983: AIK (reserves coach)
- 1986–1987: Täby IS (youth coach)
- 1990: AIK (youth coach)
- * Club domestic league appearances and goals

Kurt Liander (28 January 1932 – 10 March 2020) was a Swedish footballer and football manager.

He played mostly for AIK and IFK Stockholm.

He played 5 times for the Sweden national team.

He transitioned his sporting career as a manager.
