= Arne Holmgren =

Swedish biochemist (1940–2020)

- Born: 21 December 1940; Södermanland, Sweden
- Died: 6 January 2020 (aged 79)
- Occupation: biochemistry
- Known for: redox

Arne Holmgren (21 December 1940 — 6 January 2020) was a Swedish biochemist known as a redox pioneer. He studied medicine at Uppsala University in 1962 and became a medical student. He received his Ph.D. in 1968 from the Karolinska Institute (KI) where he became associate professor in 1969, and became a certified doctor in 1974.

In the years 1970-1973, Holmgren was a senior lecturer in medical chemistry and 1973-1982 a research lecturer and assistant professor of medical chemistry. He was appointed professor of medical protein chemistry and enzymology at KI in 1983, and in 1991 professor of biochemistry and director of the Department of Biochemistry at the Medical Nobel Institute, KI.

Holmgren's research pioneered the structure and function of thioredoxin and thioredoxin reductase and discovered glutaredoxins. His investigations clarified basic sulphur and selenium-dependent redox mechanisms crucial for DNA synthesis, defence against oxidative stress and redox signalling in all living cells from bacteria to nerve cells. His work remains of particular importance for cancer research and the treatment of infectious diseases and inflammation.

Holmgren was elected in 1991 as a member of the Academy of Sciences and became a member of the Nobel Assembly at the Karolinska Institutet. He was awarded several scientific prizes, including the Thé Svedberg Prize 1979, the Eric K Fernström Prize for Young Researchers at KI 1980, the Eric K Fernström Nordic Prize in Medical Research from Lund University in 1997 for "his pioneering studies of redoxin enzymes of central importance to the cell and life functions ". In 2006, he received the Abraham Spector Prize, Columbia University, New York and the Science and Humanity Prize from The Oxygen Club of California, Santa Barbara. Holmgren became Doctor Honoris causa at the University of Nancy, France in 2009.

== See also ==
- Roland Stocker
