= Brostugan, Kärsön =

Historic building in Stockholm, Sweden

Coordinates: 59°19′32″N 17°54′18″E

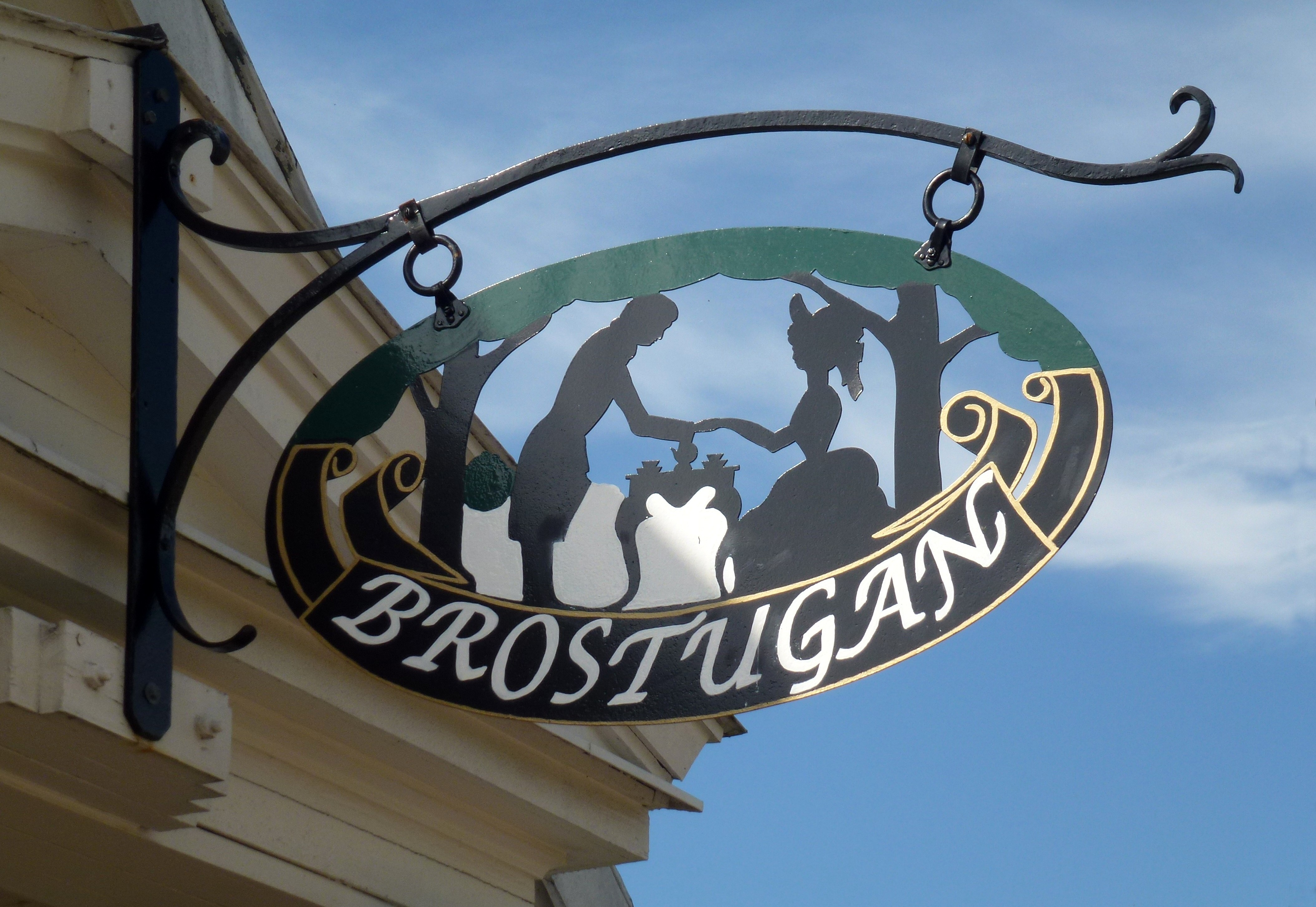

Brostugan is a restaurant in Kärsön, Stockholm, Sweden. It is located in a building dating from the 1700s on the southern side of Nockebybron within Ekerö Municipality.

== History ==
Brostugan was originally built in the 1780s and became the residence of the bridge-keeper when Gustavus III had built the first bridge between Kärsön and Drottningholm Palace in 1787. In 1932 it was renovated and redesigned by architect Ivar Tengbom.

Since 1991 Brostugan and the surroundings of the Drottningholm Palace have been a UNESCO World Heritage Site and officially part of Sweden's protected heritage.

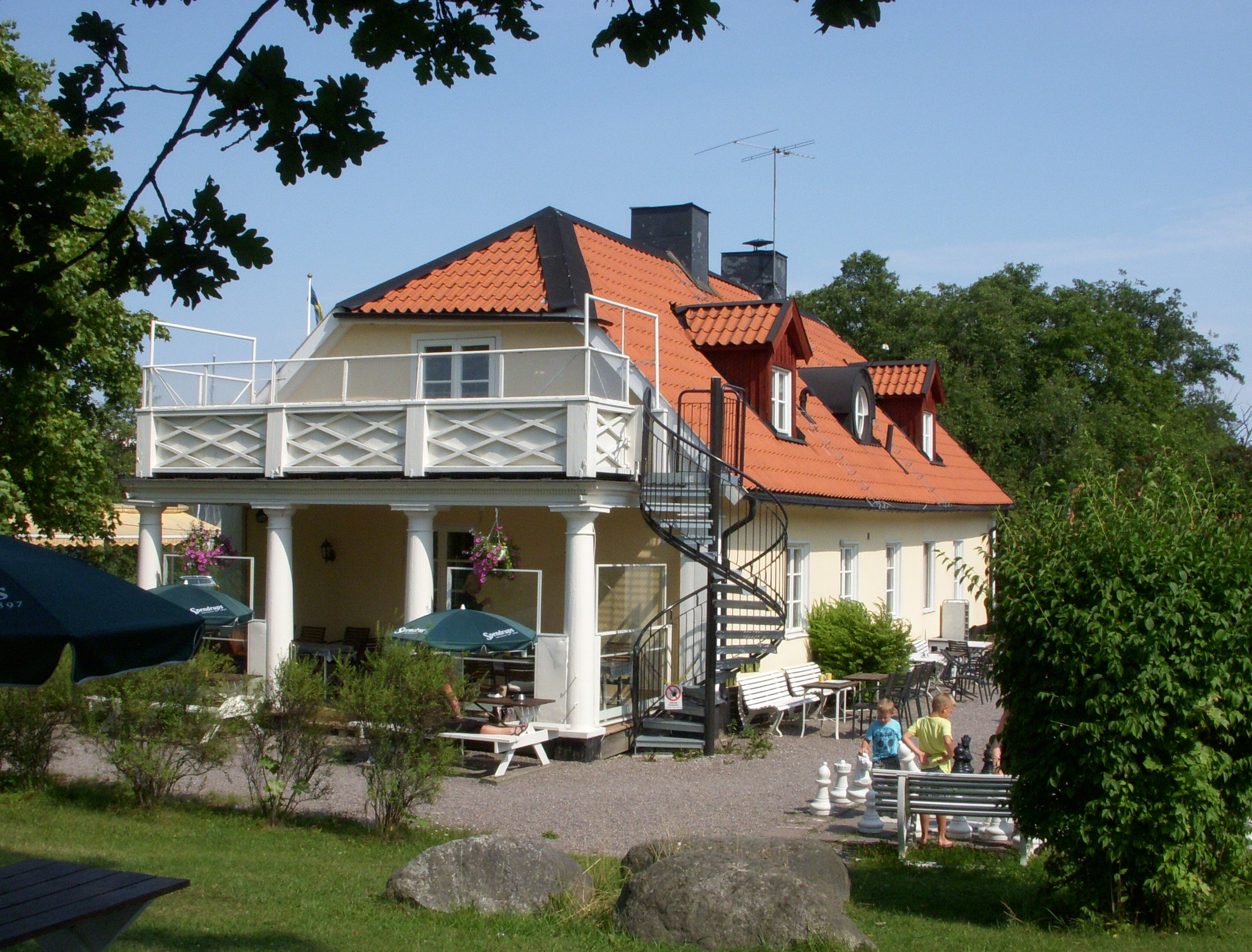

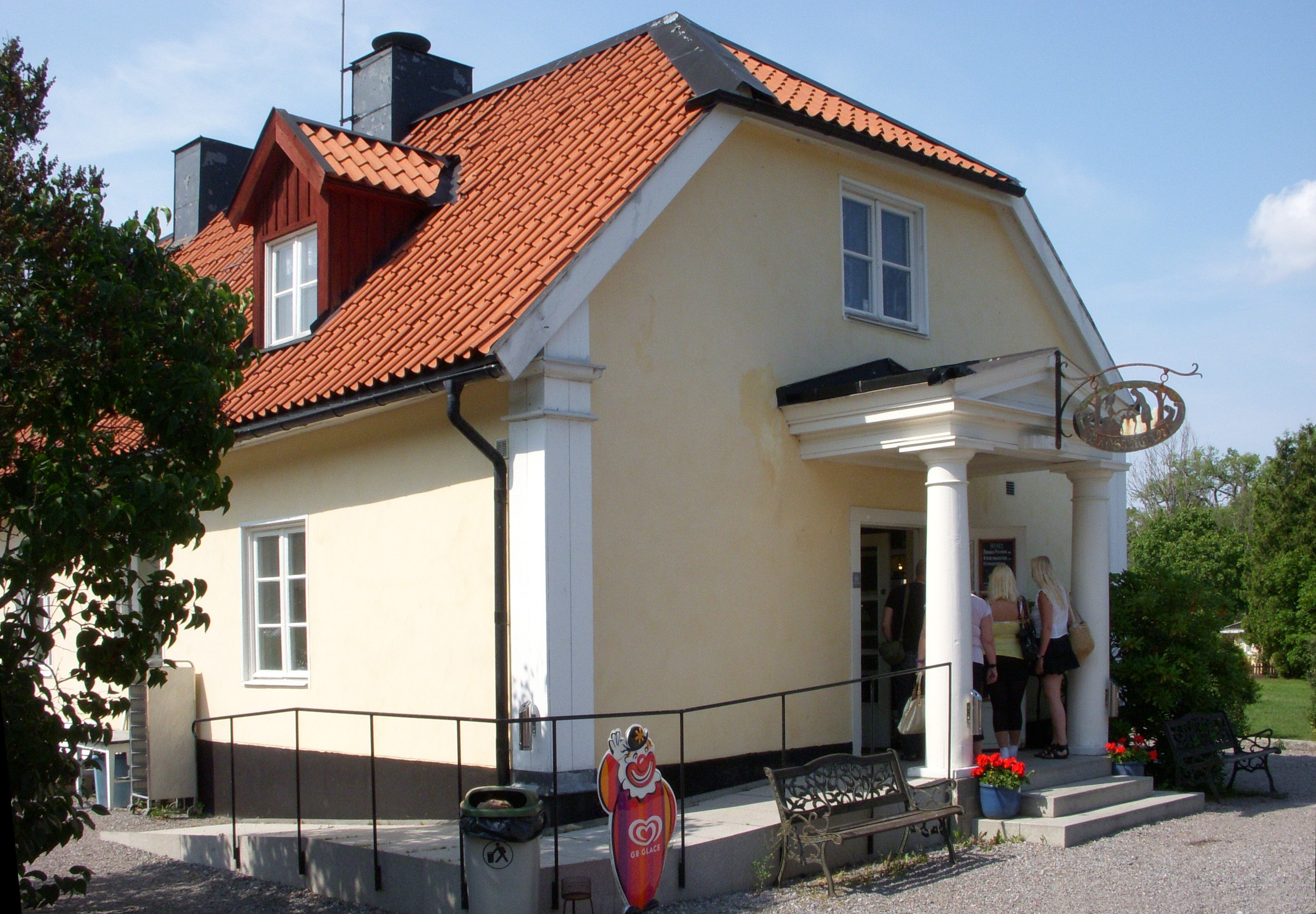

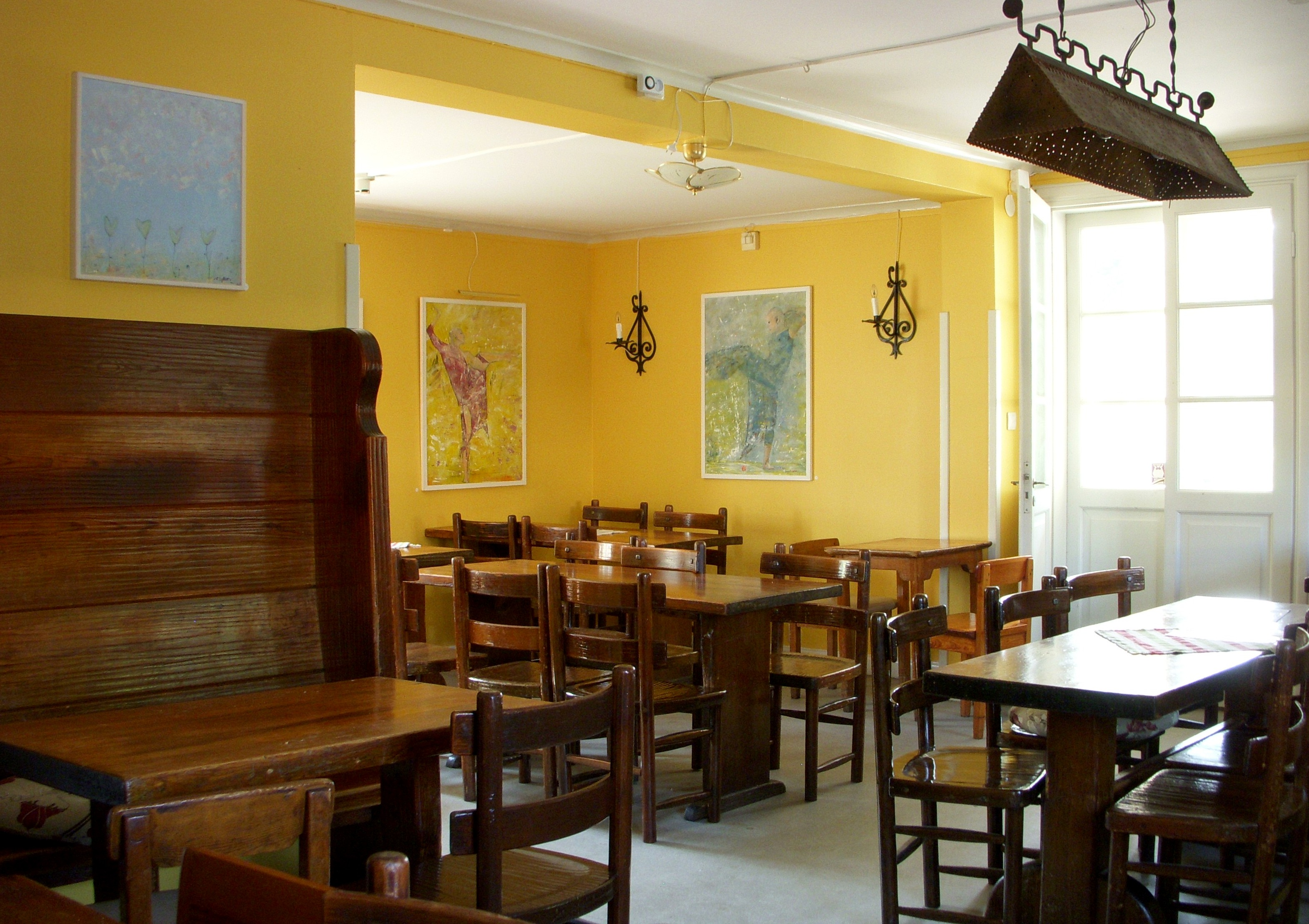
