= Jan-Olof Ekholm =

Swedish writer (1931–2020)

- Born: 20 October 1931; Grytnäs, Dalarna, Sweden
- Died: 14 January 2020 (aged 88)
- Writing career
- Genres: Detective fiction, Children's Literature

Jan-Olof Ekholm (20 October 1931 – 14 January 2020) was a Swedish detective fiction writer born in Grytnäs, Dalarna, Sweden, also known for some children's literature works. He was one of the members of the presidium of the Swedish Crime Writers' Academy (Svenska Deckarakademin). Ekholm's books have been translated to Norwegian, Danish, German, Russian, Ukrainian, and Czech.

Ekholm died, age 88, on 14 January 2020.

== Awards ==
- Svenska Deckarakademin (Swedish Detective Academy) award in 1979 for his non-fiction work Mälarmördaren.
- Temmelburken detective fiction award in 2000.

== Movies ==
- A movie based on Ekholm's early children's book Hurra för Ludvig Lurifax (1965) was produced in Soviet Union in 1984 under the title Ryzhiy, chestnyy, vlyublyonnyy (Red, honest, in love)
- A Swedish murder mystery movie Sista körningen (1996) was co-written by Jan-Olof Ekholm.
