= Berith Bohm =

Swedish actress (1932–2020)

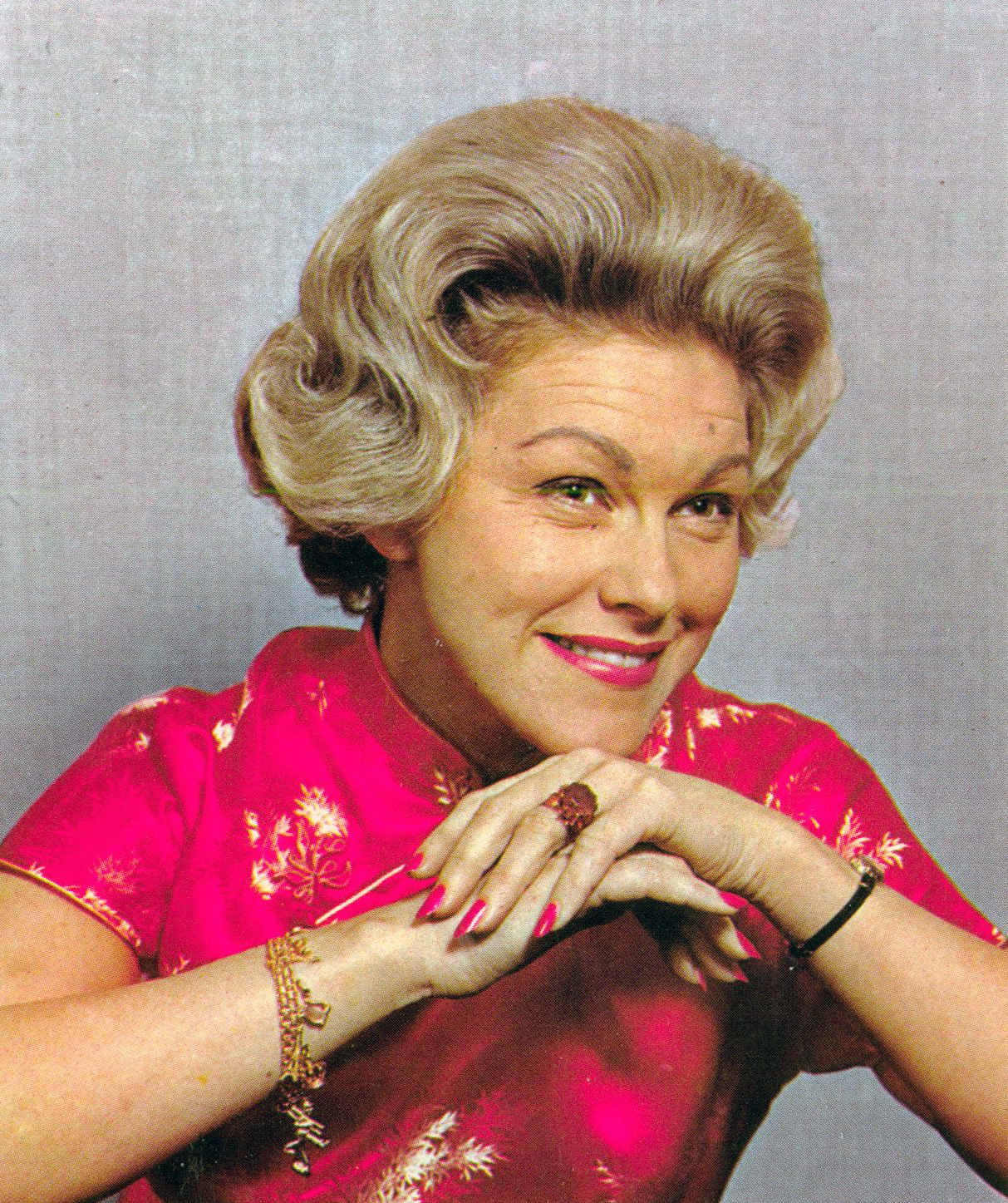
- Berith Bohm in 1965

Background information
- Born: Maria Kristina Bohm; 23 August 1932; Stockholm, Sweden
- Died: 14 May 2020 (aged 87)
- Genres: Opera
- Occupation(s): Singer, actress

Berith Maria Kristina Bohm (23 August 1932 – 14 May 2020) was a Swedish opera singer and actress in theater. In her teens she participated in a talent show in Bromma and performed the song "Fjorton år tror jag visst att jag var". After some time at Furuvik youth circus she came to Oscarsteatern in Stockholm and then followed Stora Teatern in Gothenburg. Among her more famous theater roles were Csardasfurstinnan in Sköna Helena. She also performed at Volksoper in Vienna, Austria.

Bohm died on 14 May 2020 at the age of 87.
