= Vanilla hearts =

Shortcrust shell filled with vanilla cream

Vanilla Heart
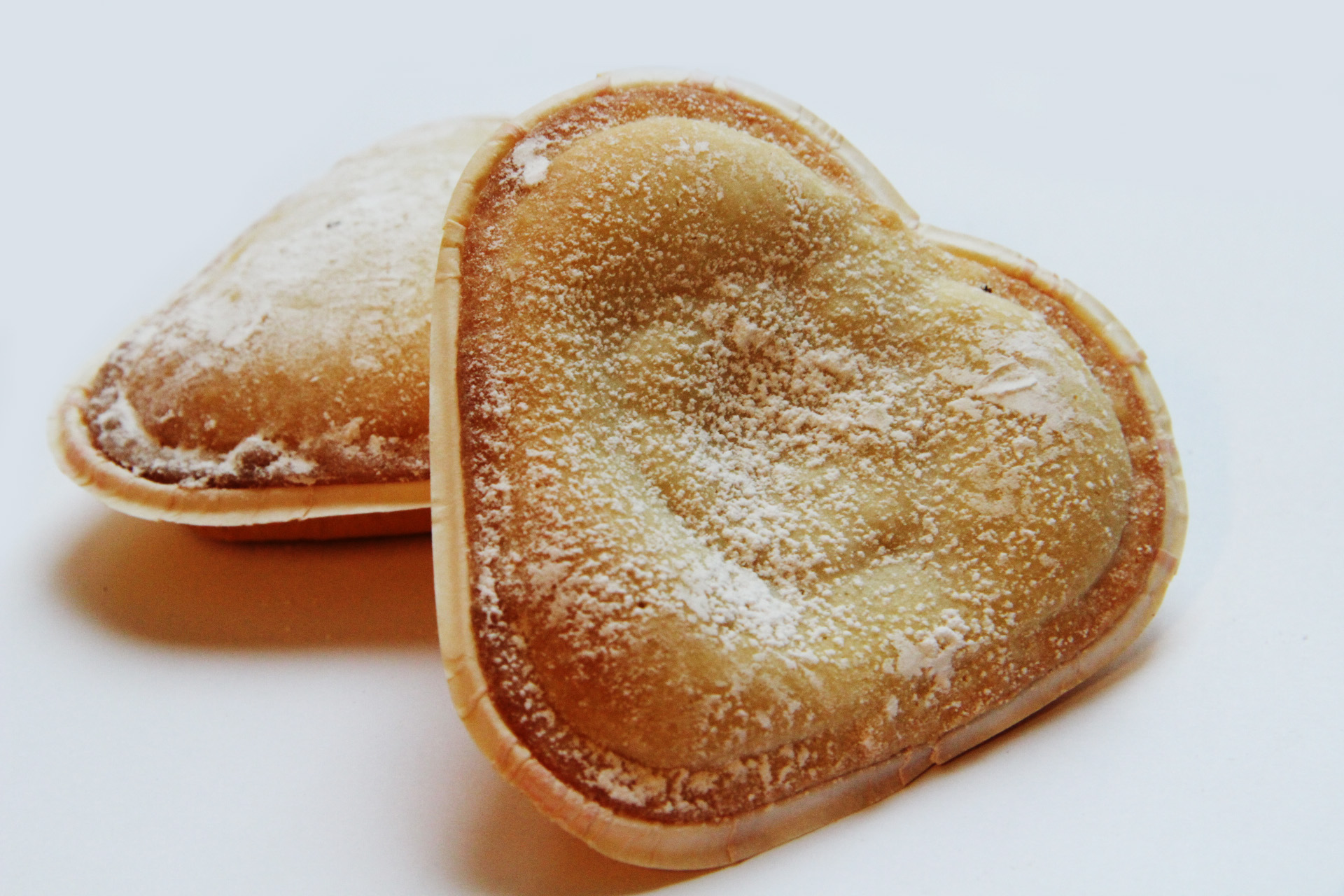
- Two vanilla hearts.
- Alternative names: Vaniljhjärta
- Type: Pastry
- Course: Dessert
- Cooking time: 60 minutes to 1 hour 30 min
- Serving temperature: Slightly cold to room temperature
- Main ingredients: Butter, flour, egg, milk, sugar, potato starch, and vanilla
- Ingredients generally used: Powdered sugar
- Other information: Needs to cool for additional 30 minutes.

Vanilla hearts, or vaniljhjärtan in Swedish, is a type of pastry made of shortcrust dough formed into hearts, filled with vanilla cream, with powdered sugar sprinkled on top. They are usually found among the top-ten when it comes to Sweden's most liked small biscuits and cakes.

While the heart is the most common shape it can be baked in a variety of molds, such as pleated. In a recipe from 1913's edition of Prinsessornas kokbok they have a plain round shape and is called Norska linser (English: Norwegian lenses).
