= Lennart Jirlow =

Swedish artist (1936–2020)

Lennart Martin Jirlow (24 April 1936 – 18 April 2020) was a Swedish painter and scenographer.

Jirlow got his education at Konstfack and at the academy of arts in Florence. His first exhibition was in Stockholm in 1958, and after this he spent most of his time in France. Most of his motifs are inspired by everyday occurrences in the south of France and Paris, and also theatre was a popular subject within his work. He did portraits of Karl Gerhard, Maj-Britt Nilsson and Jarl Kulle. He also designed posters for Bocuse d'Or and Gröna Lund. Jirlow also worked with stage design and he helped with the staging of Spanska flugan at Vasateatern 1982, Gamle Adam at Vasateatern 1984 and Annie Get Your Gun at Chinateatern in 1990. He also made the film Utflykt i det sköna which was broadcast on SVT in 1980.

Jirlow presented an episode of the Sveriges Radio show Sommar i P1 on 14 July 2010, telling about his work and life. Povel Ramel did a song about Jirlow called "Som en gubbe på en tavla av Lennart Jirlow".

Jirlow was in 1969 married to Flavia Jirlow (née Nani). The couple had two children together, Catherine (born 1969) and Fredrik (born 1972).
