= Mix Megapol =

Swedish radio network

Mix Megapol is a private Swedish radio network controlled by Bauer Media Group. It launched in 1993 under the name Skärgårdsradion (Archipelago Radio). Later that year the name was changed to Radio Megapol when the broadcasting permissions were auctioned out. In 1997 the word "Mix" was added and their slogan became "The best mix of hits and oldies". Mix Megapol is on air in 24 cities from Kiruna in the north to Malmö in the south. They have over two million listeners per week. Their target group is people aged between 25 and 45.

== History ==
In 2006, Mix Megapol was merged with the local stations Radio City 107.3 (Gothenburg) and Radio City 107.0 (Lund) by the station owner SBS.

== Affiliates ==
	Market	Station
AB 01:2	Stockholm	Mix Megapol 104,3 Stockholm
D 02:2	Eskilstuna	Mix Megapol 107,3 Sörmland
E 01:2	Linköping	Mix Megapol 106,9 Östergötland
F 01:1	Jönköping	Mix Megapol 105,1 Jönköping
F 02:1	Västra Småland	Mix Megapol 104,6 Värnamo
G 01:2	Växjö	Mix Megapol 105,8 Växjö
H 01:2	Kalmar/Öland	Mix Megapol 105,4 Kalmar län
I 01:2	Gotland	Radio Four
K 01:1	Blekinge	Mix Megapol 104,7 Karlskrona
M 03:1	Helsingborg	Mix Megapol 106,0 Helsingborg
M 02:2	Lund	Mix Megapol 107,0 Malmö
N 01:1	Halmstad	Mix Megapol 104,2 Halland
N 02:1	Varberg	Mix Megapol 106,5 Varberg
O 01:4	Göteborg	Mix Megapol 107,3 Göteborg
O 02:1	Norra Bohuslän	Mix Megapol 104,2 Bohuslän
P 01:1	Borås	Mix Megapol 105,5 Borås
R 01:1	Skövde	Mix Megapol 106,4 Skaraborg
S 01:1	Karlstad	Mix Megapol 105,4 Karlstad
T 01:1	Örebro	Mix Megapol 104,7 Örebro
U 01:1	Västerås	Mix Megapol 106,1 Västmanland
W 01:1	Falun/Borlänge	Mix Megapol 105,5 Dalarna
W 02:2	Mora/Sälen	Mix Megapol 106,8 Mora/Sälen
X 01:1	Gävle	Mix Megapol 104,9 Gästrikland
X 02:1	Hudiksvall	Mix Megapol 105,1 Hälsingland
Y 01:1	Sundsvall	Mix Megapol 105,5 Sundsvall
Y 02:1	Örnsköldsvik	Mix Megapol 104,8 Örnsköldsvik
AC 02:3	Skellefteå	Mix Megapol 105,4 Skellefteå
AC 01:1	Umeå	Mix Megapol 104,2 Umeå
BD 02:1	Gällivare	Mix Megapol 105,2 Gällivare/Kiruna
