= Musikhjälpen =

Swedish radio and television program

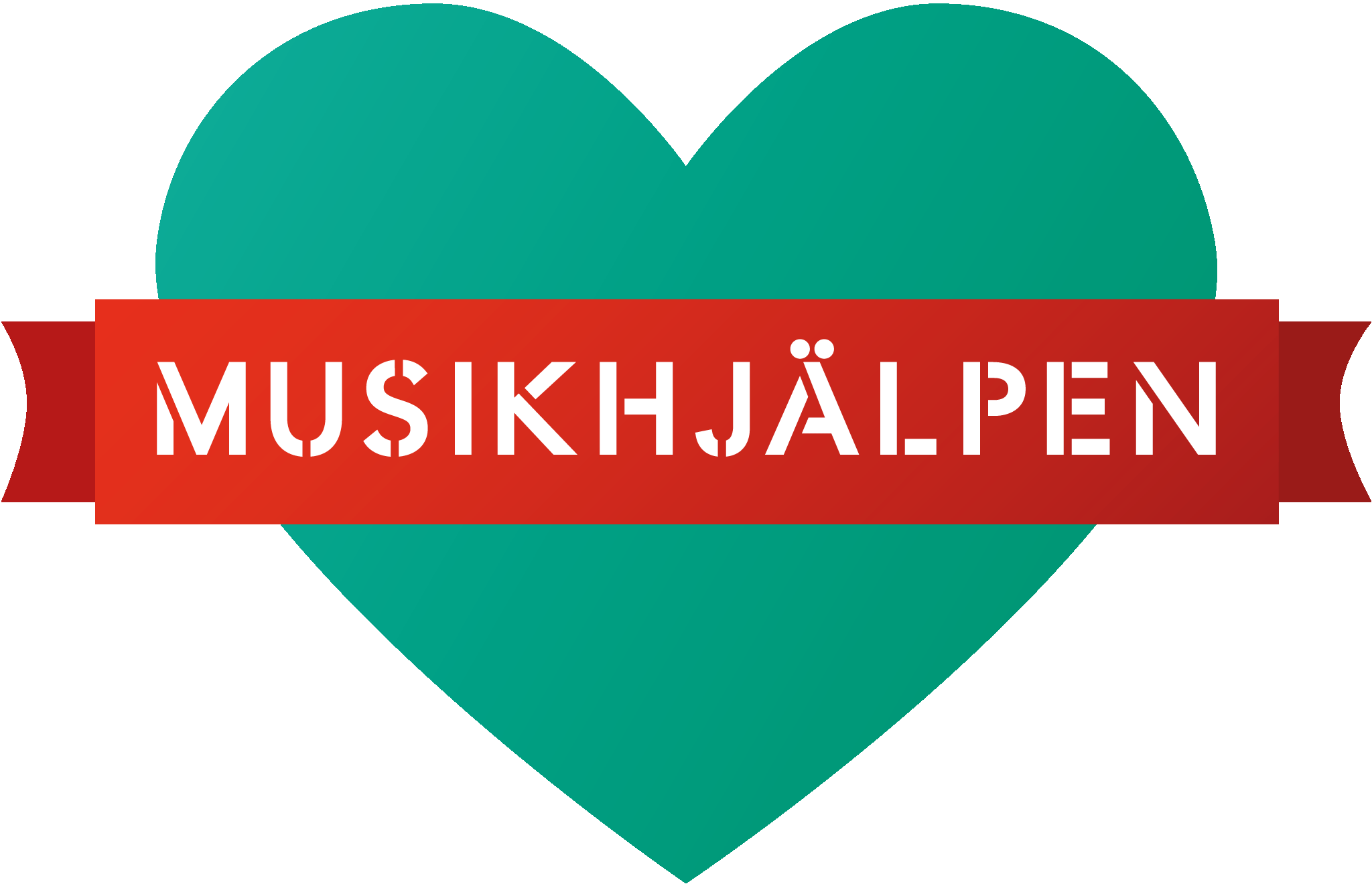
- Logo used since 2022
- Genre: Benefit performance
- Based on: Serious Request
- Starring: Oscar Zia; Linnea Wikblad; Sofia Dalén
- Country of origin: Sweden
- Original language: Swedish
- No. of seasons: 15

Production
- Running time: 144 hours (6 days, 24 hours per day)
- Production companies: SVT, SR, Radiohjälpen

Original release
- Network: SVT, SR
- Release: 13 December 2008 – present

Musikhjälpen (Swedish: [mɵˈsîːkˌjɛlːpɛn]; lit. 'The Music Aid') is a Swedish televised benefit performance radio show marathon. The annually recurring show is a charity fundraiser for a chosen cause, the cause is changed each year. Three radio hosts or television personalities are locked inside a glass building (called glasburen, lit. 'the glass cage') for 144 hours (6 days, 24 hours per day). Each presenter acts as a host for eight hours respectively, totaling three shifts per day. It is broadcast in December, during one week, with dates varying each year.

The show is broadcast live on the public service radio network Sveriges Radio and on television through SVT. Viewers can make song requests by donating money either by using a standalone app or the Swish service. Viewers can also choose to start their own fundraiser on behalf of themselves or anything in general, with the money raised being pooled into the main fundraiser. Similarly, the audience can create and place bids on charity auctions connected to the main event. Historically, listeners paid and sent a text message with a song request.

The 2023 edition collected 59.5 million kronor (equivalent to $5.9 million in 2023). Despite a global recession, said amount is the second largest in the history of the show. The proceeds of the fundraiser are managed by the Radiohjälpen foundation, which is in turned partnered with other charity organizations. Roughly 20 cameras are used in the production, with footage interspersed in a multi-cam format. It is based on the Dutch Serious Request radio and television campaign.

== Annual editions ==
=== Musikhjälpen 2008 ===
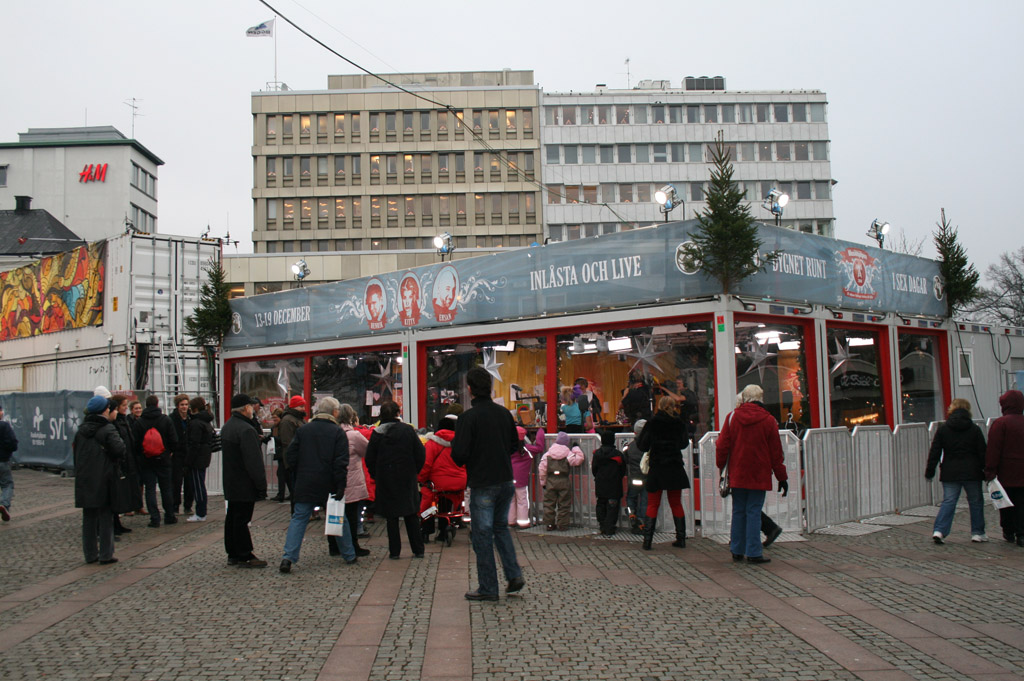
Musikhjälpen-house in Malmö 2008

Theme – "67 miljoner flyktingar behöver din hjälp" ("67 million refugees need your help")

The event was held for the first time in 2008, organized by Sveriges Television, Sveriges Radio and Radiohjälpen.

The 2008 glass house stood at Gustaf Adolfs torg in Malmö from 13 to 19 December. The show was broadcast around the clock at Sveriges Radio P3 and Din gata 100,6, and also on SVT2 at certain times of day. It was hosted by the radio presenters Kitty Jutbring, Henrik Torehammar and Ehsan Noroozi. A daily half-hour highlights show Musikhjälpen: Extra was hosted by Fredrik Ekelund and Charlotte Lundgren. Singer Jason Diakité (also known by his stage name Timbuktu) was a reporter, and traveled a month before Musikhjälpen to Congo, where he met refugees and assisted the organization on the ground.

In its first year, Musikhjälpen gained 3,016,247 SEK in donations.

=== Musikhjälpen 2009 ===
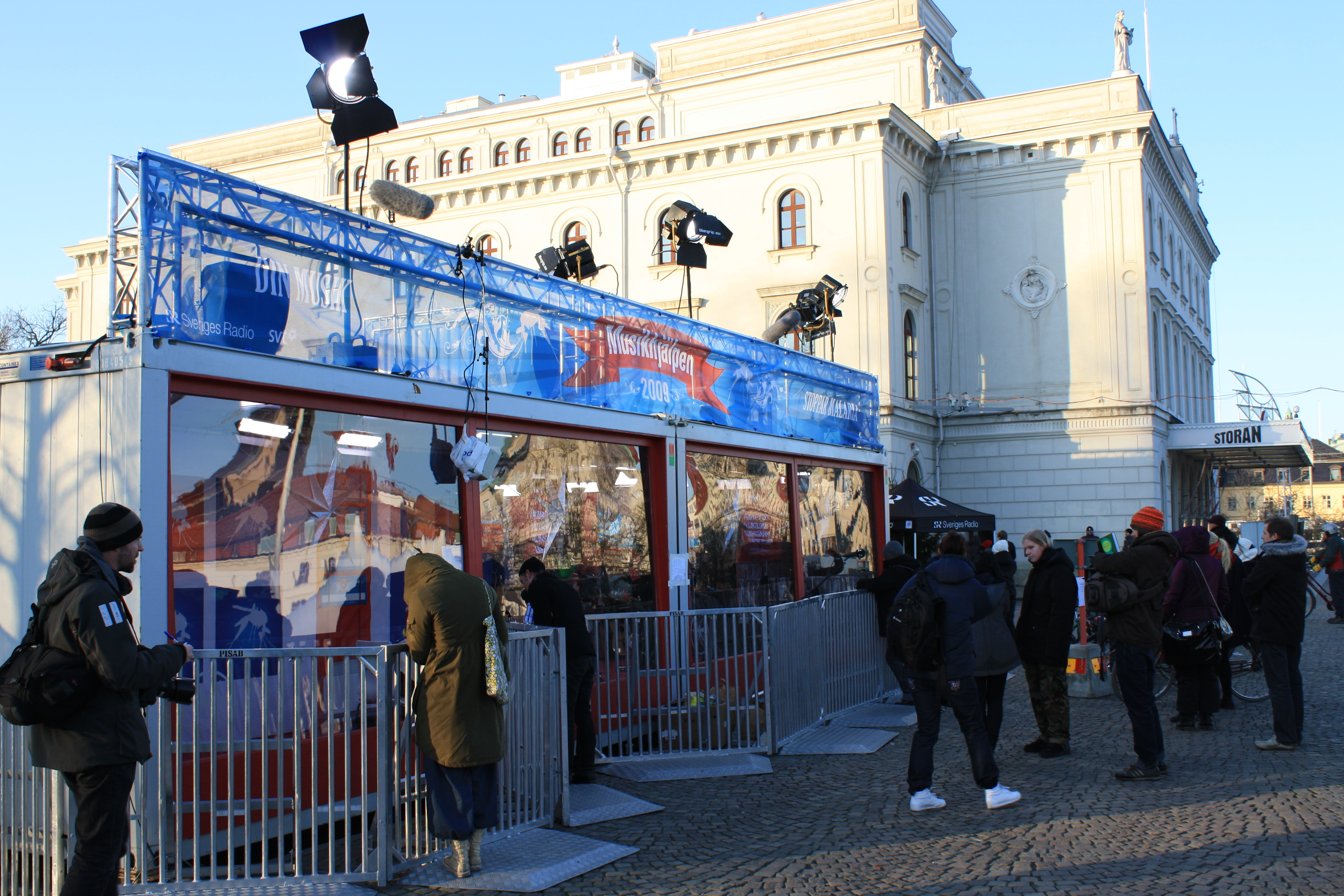
Musikhjälpen-house in Gothenburg 2009

Theme – "Din musik stoppar malaria" ("Your music stops malaria")

In 2009, the Musikhjälpen glass house stood at Avenyn in Gothenburg between 14–20 December. The theme for this year was malaria and as in 2008 the show was broadcast live around the clock at Sveriges Radio P3 and on SVT Play at certain times. The hosts were radio presenters Ametist Azordegan, Christer Lundberg and rapper Jason Diakité (a.k.a. Timbuktu), who all got locked into the glass house by singer Alice Cooper. Traveling reporters this year were Ehsan Noroozi and Kitty Jutbring. The Musikhjälpen Extra host was Mela Tesfazion.

5,748,442 SEK was raised this year, approximately 2,300,000 more than in 2008.

On 7 January 2010, it was revealed that the project had been defrauded during twenty minutes on the night of 19–20 December. The number shown in the television screens which showed how to wish for songs and give money had been changed. No money was ever given to the fake number and no arrests were ever made.

=== Musikhjälpen 2010 ===
Theme – "Barn är inte till salu" ("Children are not for sale")

In 2010, the glass house was located in Malmö for the second time in 3 years. Jason Diakité (Timbuktu) hosted again alongside morning-radio host Martina Thun and comedian Nour El-Refai. Ametist Azordegan and Christer Lundberg were traveling reporters this year and theme was the trafficking of children. As before, the show was broadcast on Sveriges Radio P3 and SVT Play, and at times on SVT during 13–19 December.

By 18 December 2010, the previous year's record total had already been broken; when the show was over 12,236,417 SEK had been collected to help the victims of trafficking.

=== Musikhjälpen 2011 ===
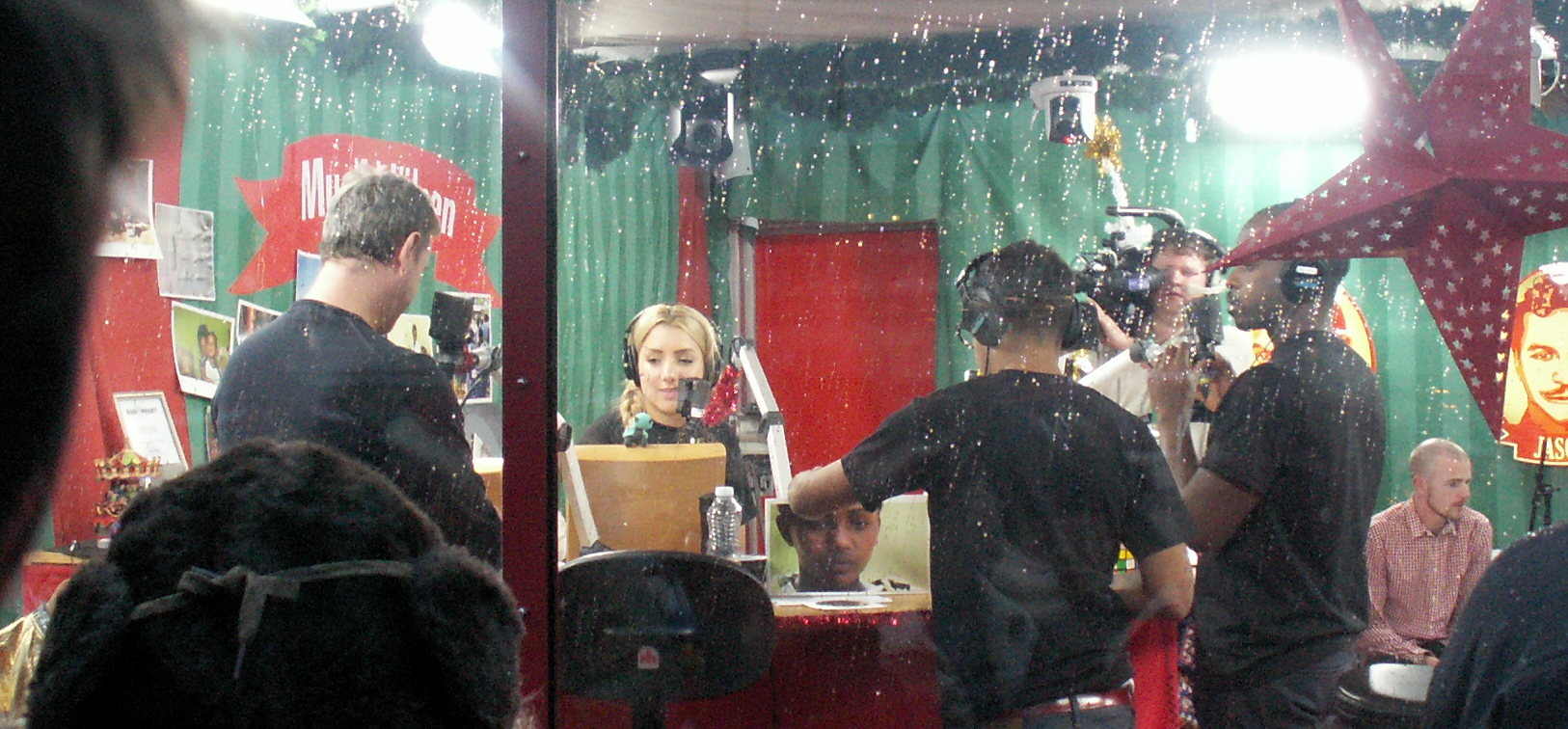
Gina Dirawi in the Musikhjälpen house in 2011

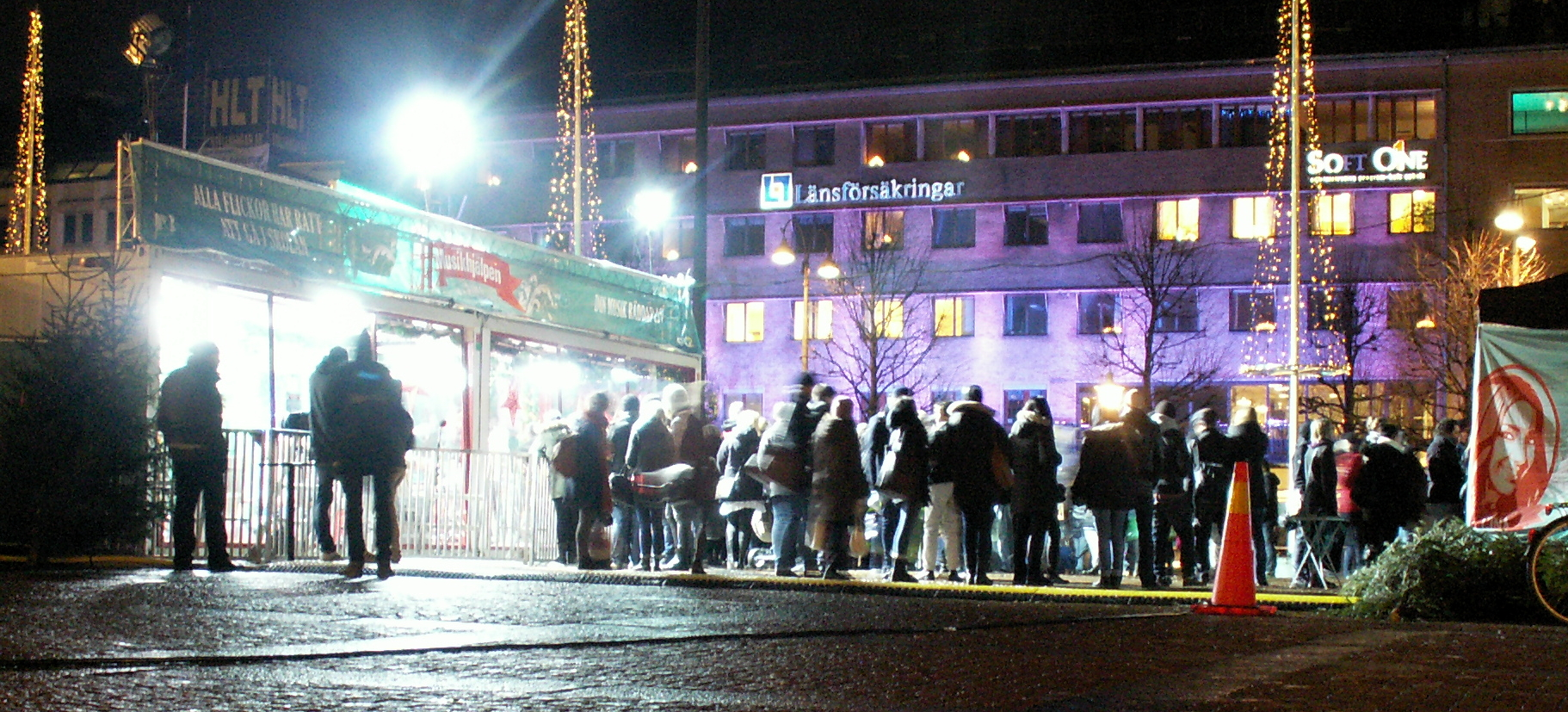
Musikhjälpen-house at Gustaf Adolfs Torg in Gothenburg 2011

Theme – "Alla flickor har rätt att gå i skolan" ("All girls have the right to go to school")

In 2011, the glass house was located in Gothenburg for a second time, at the Gustaf Adolfs torg square between 12–18 December. For the third time in a row, rapper Timbuktu hosted the show, along with TV-personality Gina Dirawi and radio presenter Kodjo Akolor. The theme for this year was that all girls should have the right to get an education. The travelling reporters for this year were comedian Klara Zimmergren and artist Daniel Adams-Ray, who visited Ethiopia.

264 auctions were held which raised 2.1 million SEK. Among the auctioned items was Michael Jackson's platinum record for his Thriller.

A total of 18,104,362 SEK was raised.

=== Musikhjälpen 2012 ===
Theme – "Barnen i slummen har rätt till rent vatten" ("Slum children have the right to clean water")

Malmö again hosted the event, from 10 to 16 December, for the third time. For the second year in a row Timbuktu, Kodjo Akolor and Gina Dirawi were the hosts of the Musikhjälpen and were locked inside the glass house. This became Timbuktu's fourth year as host of the show.

A total of 135,000 song-requests were registered, and 23,301,823 SEK was raised, again a steady increase to the previous year.

Filip & Fredrik auctioned themselves off as receptionists, which raised 221,100 SEK.

=== Musikhjälpen 2013 ===
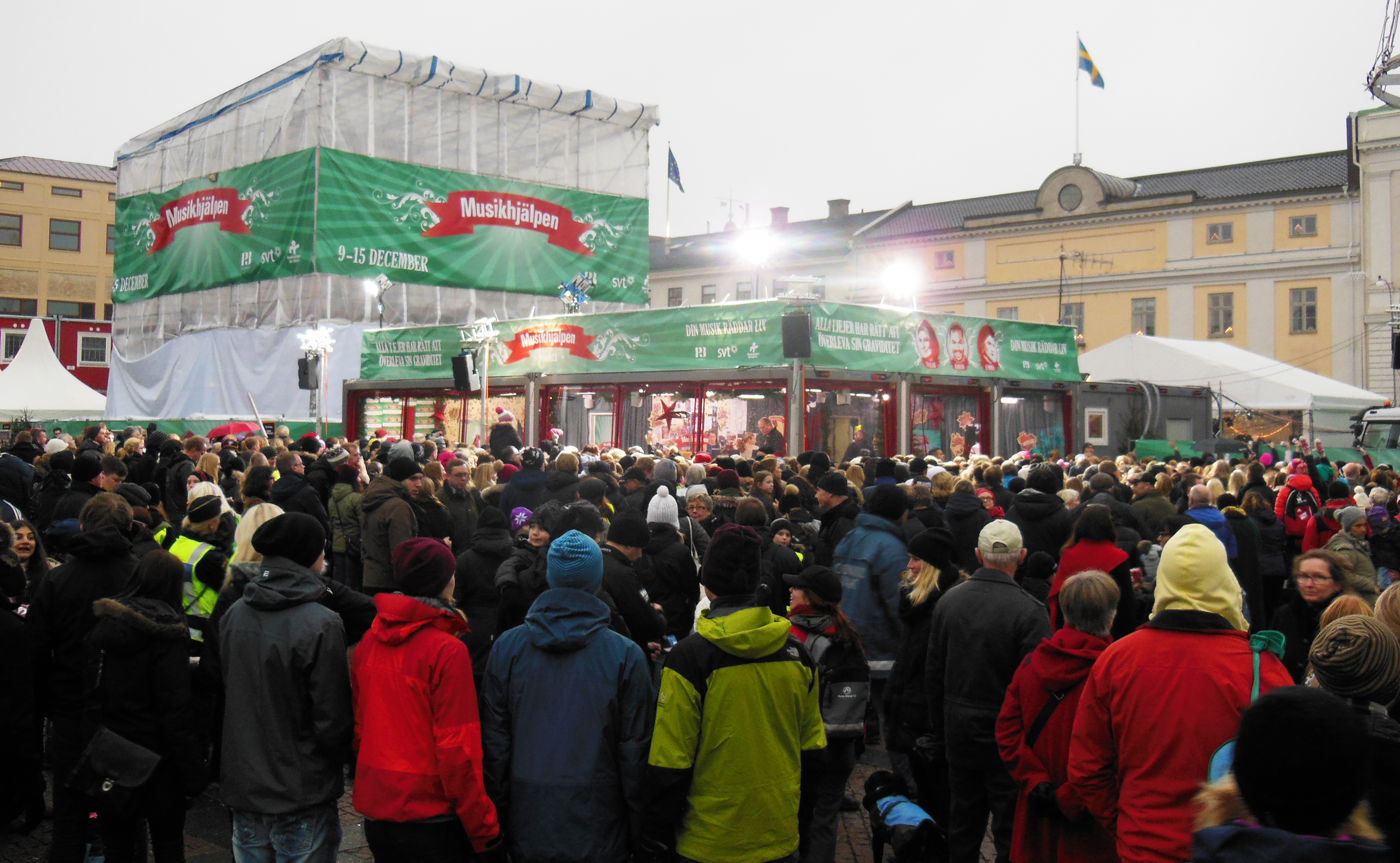
The glass house at Gustaf Adolfs torg in Gothenburg 2013.

Theme – "Alla tjejer har rätt att överleva sin graviditet" ("All girls have the right to survive a pregnancy")

Musikhjälpen was held in Gothenburg between 9–15 December 2013. This was the third time that Gothenburg had been the host city of Musikhjälpen. The show was broadcast from Gustaf Adolfs torg and this year the money was used to help pregnant girls in poorer countries.

The show's hosts were Kodjo Akolor for the third time, artist Sarah Dawn Finer and radio presenter Emma Knyckare.

For the first time since 2009, Musikhjälpen Extra was a daily show; it was hosted by Sofia Rågenklint. This year's travelling reporters were Bianca Kronlöf and Robin Olin, who went to Bangladesh to give daily live reports from the country. It was the first time that the traveling reporters were at the foreign location live throughout Musikhjälpen's broadcast.

28,426,046 SEK was raised.

=== Musikhjälpen 2014 ===
Theme – "Hjälp oss stoppa spridningen av HIV" ("Help us to stop the spread of HIV")

After the broadcast of the 2013 edition, Sveriges Radio revealed there would be a 2014 edition. Musikhjälpen was held in Uppsala for the first time. The glass house stood at Stora torget between 8 and 14 December.

Hosts for this year were the artist Linnea Henriksson, Swedish rapper Petter and radio presenter Kodjo Akolor. Travelling reporter for this edition was the blog- and TV-personality William Spetz, and destination for this year's travel was Mozambique.

=== Musikhjälpen 2015 ===
Theme – "Ingen ska behöva fly undan klimatet" ("No one should have to flee the climate")

Musikhjälpen was broadcast in 2015 for the first time from Linköping between 13 and 19 December. The theme for this year was "No one should have to flee the climate", with focus on climate related catastrophe which has forced million of people to flee. This year Kodjo Akolor, Gina Dirawi and Linnea Henriksson presented the show during the live radio and television broadcasts which was on SVT and Sveriges Radio. Samir Badran would have been the "publics ambassador", but decided to withdraw the same day as the broadcasts was about to start because of an Instagram post. The day after it was announced that Farah Erichsén and Oscar Zia became new ambassadors. The travelling reporter for this year was Clara Henry, who reported from the Philippines.

The total sum of money raised was 31,105,000 (SEK) which was a new record. The single thing that brought in the most money was a bidding on a "taco evening" along with singer Miriam Bryant which gave 103,025 (SEK) to the cause.

=== Musikhjälpen 2016 ===
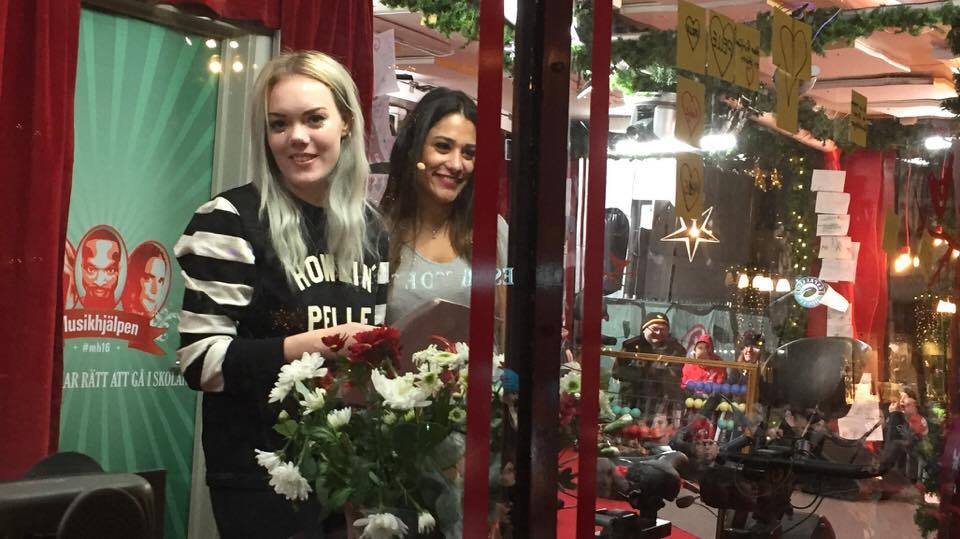
One of the show hosts, Josefine Jinder (Little Jinder) and co-host Farah Abadi in Musikhjälpen 2016, broadcast from Örebro.

Theme – "Barn i krig har rätt att gå i skolan" ("Children in war have the right to go to school")

Musikhjälpen was broadcast in 2016 for the first time from Örebro between 12 and 18 December. The hosts were Kodjo Akolor, musicians Pelle "Howlin' Pelle" Almqvist from The Hives and Josefine "Little Jinder" Jinder. This year's public ambassadors was Farah Abadi and Oscar Zia. Travelling reporter for this edition was Molly Nutley who travelled to Africa to meet people that had fled the wars. 49,003,745 SEK was raised this year which was a new record.

=== Musikhjälpen 2017 ===
Theme – "Barn är inte till salu" ("Children are not for sale")

The tenth Musikhjälpen was hosted at Rådhustorget in Umeå. The three presenters for this year was Farah Abadi, Kalle Zackari Wahlström and Molly Sandén which was locked inside a glass house to host 144 hours of live radio as earlier years. This edition was held between 11 and 17 December. The ambassadors for the audience this year was blogger Hanna "HanaPee" Persson and adventurer and athlete Aron Anderson. Travelling reporter for this year was Linnea Henriksson who traveled to the Philippines. This year broke the record for money received as 74,410,363 (SEK) was collected.

=== Musikhjälpen 2018 ===
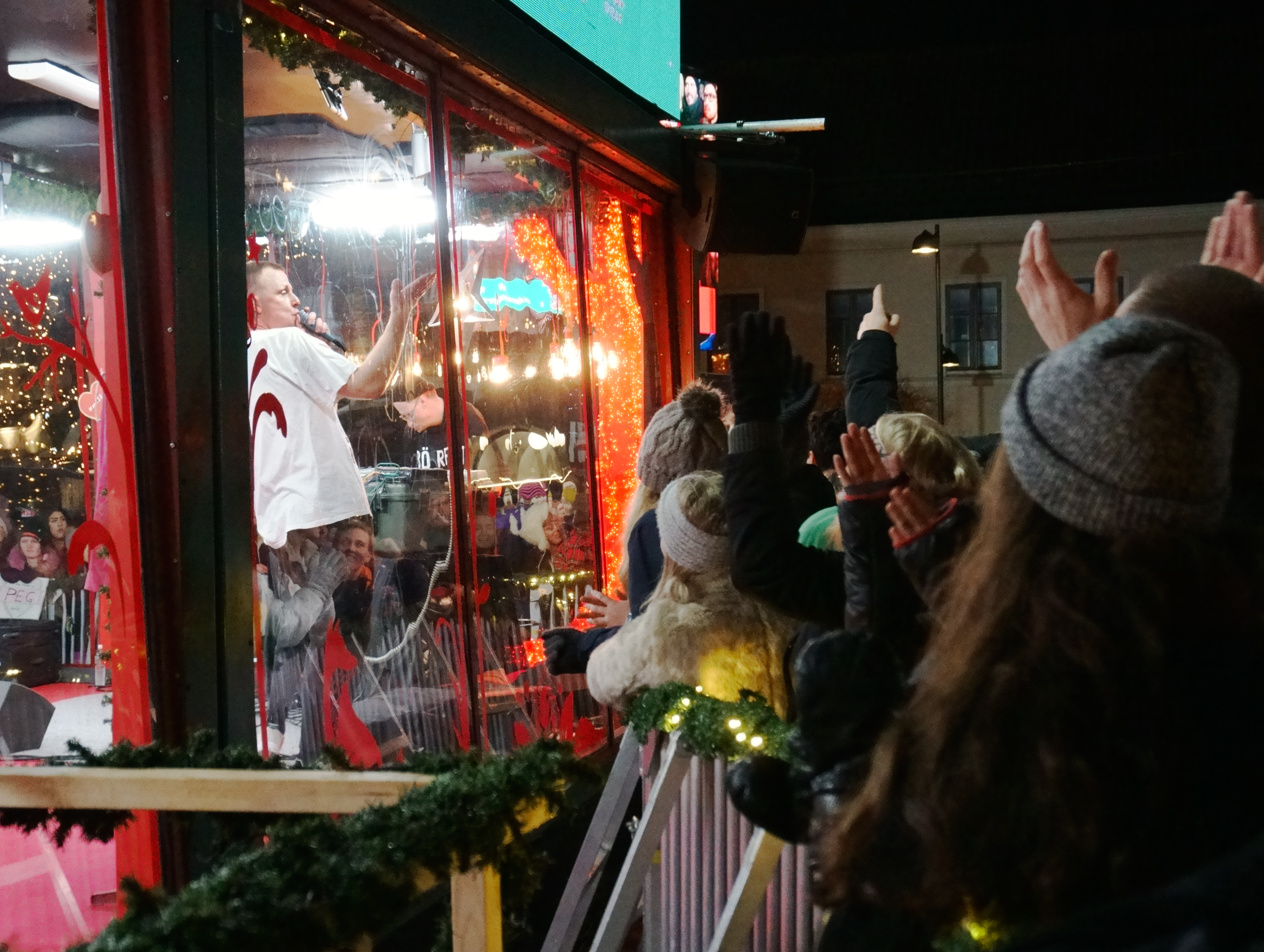
Familjen playing at Musikhjälpen in Lund 2018

Theme – "Alla har rätt att funka olika" ("Everyone is entitled to function differently")

The city of Lund was the host of the eleventh edition of Musikhjälpen. The program was broadcast between 10 and 16 December at Stortorget in Lund and hosts for this year was Daniel Adams-Ray, William Spetz and Farah Abadi, all three has in earlier years been part of Musikhjälpen as travelling reporters. The theme for this year was built around people with special needs that live in poor and underdeveloped nations. Travelling reporter was Hanna Persson "HanaPee" who visited Guatemala. Ambassadors for this year was Peg Parnevik and Aron Anderson.

During the week 50,550,204 (SEK) was collected.

=== Musikhjälpen 2019 ===
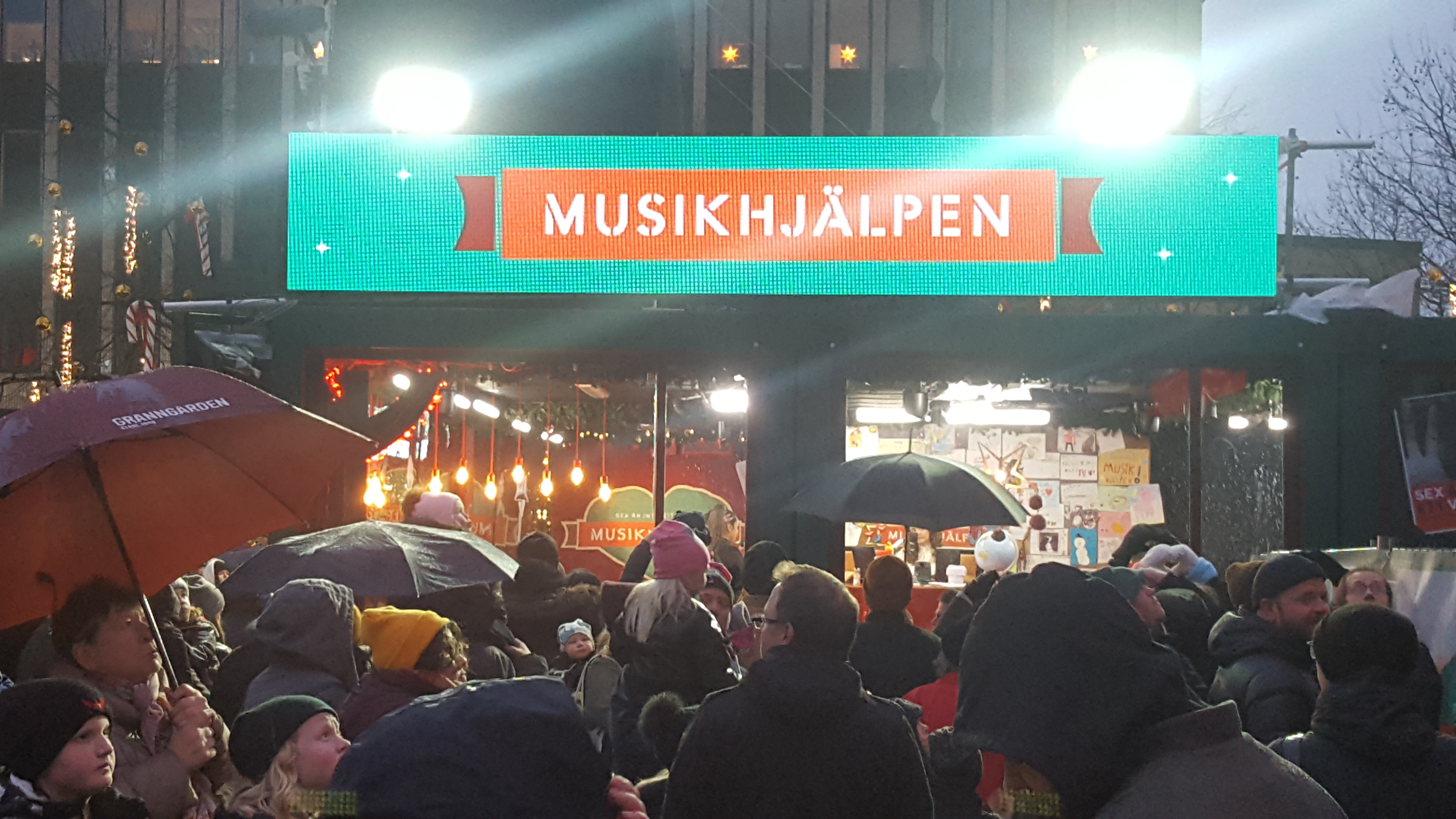
The Musikhjälpen-house 2019, broadcast from Västerås

Theme – "Sex är inte ett vapen" ("Sex is not a weapon")

Musikhjälpen 2019 was hosted between 9–15 December 2019 in Stora torget in Västerås. This was the first time Musikhjälpen was broadcast from Västerås, presenters for this year was announced on 11 November as Farah Abadi, Miriam Bryant and Daniel Hallberg. The travelling reporter for this years edition was singer Janice Kavander, she travelled to Uganda. Ambassadors for the audience this year was Arantxa Alvarez and Aron Anderson.

This year a total of 50,572,139 (SEK) was collected.

=== Musikhjälpen 2020 ===
Theme – "Ingen människa ska lämnas utan vård" ("No human should be left without hospital care")

Musikhjälpen 2020 was hosted between 14–20 December 2020. Firstly this years Musikhjälpen was to be held in Norrköping, but because of the COVID-19 pandemic, it was decided that this year's edition was to be held at a location in Stockholm. Presenters for this year are Brita Zackari, Farah Abadi and Felix Sandman.

=== Musikhjälpen 2021 ===
Theme – "För en värld utan barnarbete" ("For a world without child labor")

Musikhjälpen 2021 was hosted between 13–19 December 2021, at Gamla Torget in Norrköping. With Brita Zackari, Oscar Zia and Anis Don Demina as presenters. On 15 December Oscar Zia had to leave the glass house as he suffered from a cold. He was replaced by Kodjo Akolor. On 16 December, it was revealed that Anis Don Demina had also become sick with a cold and had to leave the glass house, he was replaced by Linnea Henriksson.

=== Musikhjälpen 2022 ===
Theme – "För en tryggare barndom på flykt från krig" ("For a safer childhood for war refugees")

Musikhjälpen 2022 was hosted between 12–18 December 2022, at Kungstorget in Gothenburg. Presenters for this year is Klas Eriksson, Tina Mehrafzoon and Oscar Zia.

=== Musikhjälpen 2023 ===
Theme – "Ingen ska behöva dö av hunger" ("No one should have to die of hunger")

Musikhjälpen 2023 was hosted between 11–17 December 2023, at Stortorget in Växjö. This years hosts were Oscar Zia, Linnéa Wikblad, and Sofia Dalén. Traveling reporter was Tina Mehrafzoon. Ambassador on Stortorget was Assia Dahir.

=== Musikhjälpen 2024 ===
Theme – "Alla har rätt att överleva sin graviditet" ("Everyone has a right to survive their pregnancy")

Musikhjälpen 2024 was hosted 9–15 December 2024, at Stora torget in Sundsvall. This years hosts were Linnéa Wikblad, Assia Dahir, and Emil Hansius. Traveling reporter was Amie Bramme Sey, and ambassador on Stora torget was Behrouz Badreh.

During the broadcast, the Swish service crashed due to being overloaded.

A total of 60,070,658 Swedish kronor (€5.2M, US$5.5M, or £4.3M) was collected, the second highest sum in the history of the show.

=== Musikhjälpen 2025 ===
Theme – "Alla barn har rätt att gå i skolan" ("Every child has the right to go to school")

Musikhjälpen 2025 took place at Stora Torget in Karlstad between December 1–7. This was the first year the event was held during the first week of December. The theme for this year was “Every child has the right to go to school.” The hosts were Linnéa Wikblad, Assia Dahir, and Hampus Hedström. This year’s traveling reporter was P3 journalist and foreign correspondent Love Lyssarides, while comedian and artist Pontus Bjernekull Mörner served as the on-site square reporter.

=== Musikhjälpen 2026 ===
Theme – "För psykisk hälsa i krig och kris" ("For mental health in war and crisis")

Musikhjälpen 2026 is planned to be hosted between 30 November–6 December 2026, at Stora torget in Linköping. This years hosts will be Hampus Hedström, Assia Dahir and Farah Abadi. Traveling reporter will be Love Lyssarides and the on-site square reporter will be Lovisa "Laki" Karlsson.
