= Du är det varmaste jag har =

Studio album by Lill Lindfors
- Released: June 1978
- Genre: schlager
- Label: Metronome (1978); WEA (1990)

Lill Lindfors chronology
En sång att ta hem (1976)	Du är det varmaste jag har (1978)	Tillbakablick (1979)

Du är det varmaste jag har is a 1978 Lill Lindfors studio album. In 1990, the album was re-released onto CD.

== Track listing ==
1. Du är det varmaste jag har (You Are the Sunshine of My Life) – Stevie Wonder, Bo Carlgren
2. Rus – Peps Persson
3. Så vill jag bli – Björn Afzelius
4. Musik ska byggas utav glädje – Lill Lindfors, Björn Barlach / Åke Cato
5. Jag vill bli din mjuka kudde (Paint Your Pretty Picture) – Stevie Wonder, Bo Carlgren
6. Om du nånsin kommer fram till Samarkand – Thorstein Bergman
7. Vinden drar – Carl Borenius
8. Vad leker vi för (Between the Lines) – Stevie Wonder, Bo Carlgren
9. Tillsammans är ett sätt att finnas till (Better Place to Be) – Harry Chapin, Björn Barlach, Åke Cato

== Contributors ==
1. Americo Belotto – trumpet
2. Hector Bingert – tenor saxophone
3. Anders Ekdahl – piano
4. Mats Westman – guitar
5. Janne Bergman – bass
6. Ola Brunkert – drums
7. with others

== Charts ==
Chart (1978)	Peak position
Sweden (Sverigetopplistan)	2
