= Swedish Music Hall of Fame =

Music museum in Stockholm, Sweden

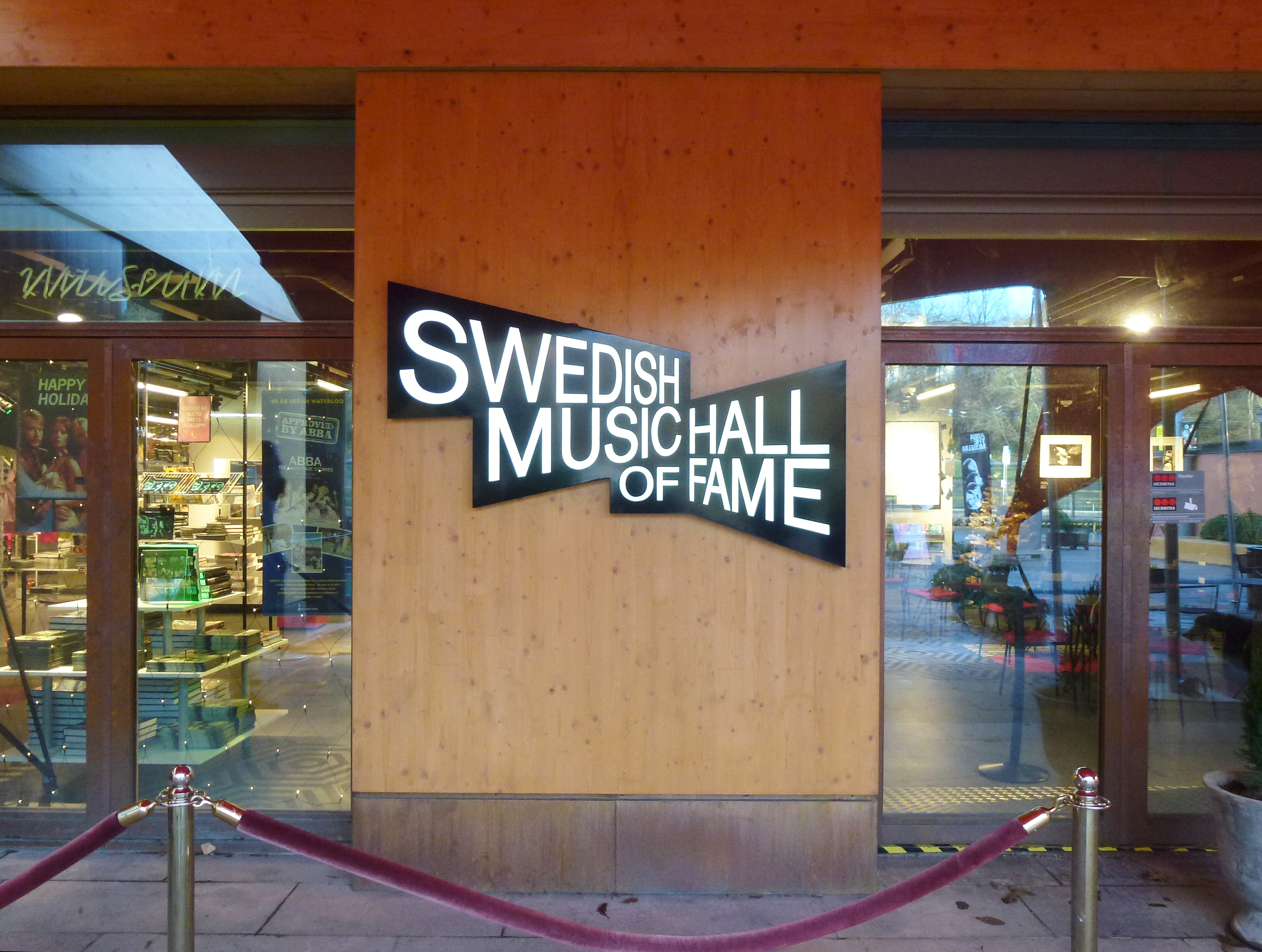

The Swedish Music Hall of Fame (SMHoF) is an initiative and an award dedicated Swedish popular music. The initiative is backed by the fundraising foundation Svenska Musikskattens Hus, which was formed in 2011. The museum was based on the American Rock and Roll Hall of Fame.

Previously there was also a museum at Djurgården in Stockholm, which was inaugurated in May 2013 and closed in February 2017.

The museum is located in the block Konsthallen at Djurgårdsvägen next to Liljevalchs konsthall. The museum opened at the same time as the ABBA Museum in May 2013 and closed in February 2017 "for space reasons". The building also houses a hotel and a restaurant. On the site was formerly Restaurant Lindgården.

Swedish Music Hall of Fame showcases temporary and permanent music exhibitions about Swedish popular music from 1920 to the present day.

Since May 2018, there has instead been a permanent exhibition about Swedish pop history at the Performing Arts Museum in Stockholm. The exhibition shows texts, films and a number of unique objects linked to the inselected in Swedish Music Hall of Fame.

== Inductees ==
=== 2014 (February 6) ===
The first twelve artists to be elected were presented on February 6, 2014. The jury that selected the artists consisted of music journalists Jan Gradvall, Kersti Adams-Ray, Per Sinding-Larsen and Ametist Azordegan.

- Abba
- Eva Dahlgren
- Ebba Grön
- Entombed
- Jan Johansson
- The Latin Kings
- Nationalteatern
- Stina Nordenstam
- Roxette
- Evert Taube
- Cornelis Vreeswijk
- Monica Zetterlund

=== 2015 (February 12) ===
The jury consisted of Jan Gradvall, Per Sinding-Larsen, Ametist Azorddegan and Kerstin Behrendtz. This year allowed previously elected artists and music creators to be involved in the voting process.

- Alice Babs
- Jussi Björling
- Gullan Bornemark
- Anders Burman
- Neneh Cherry
- Carola Häggkvist
- Ulf Lundell
- Yngwie Malmsteen
- Peps Persson
- Robyn

=== 2016 (February 11) ===
The jury consisted of Jan Gradvall, Per Sinding-Larsen, Ametist Azordegan, Kerstin Behrendtz and Anna Charlotta Gunnarsson.

- Leila K
- Denniz Pop
- Kent
- Barbro Hörberg
- Karl Gerhard
- Monica Dominique
- Sven-Ingvars
- Owe Thörnqvist
- Siw Malmkvist

=== 2017 (March 23) ===
The jury consisted of Anna Charlotta Gunnarson (Chairman), Per Sinding-Larsen, Kerstin Behrendtz and Lars Nylin.

- Britt Lindeborg
- Calle Jularbo
- Lill-Babs
- Looptroop Rockers
- Magnus Uggla
- Merit Hemmingson
- Ola Håkansson
- The Cardigans

=== 2018 (May 3) ===
The jury consisted of Fredrik Strage, Tara Moshizi, Kerstin Behrendtz, Lars Nylin and Anna Charlotta Gunnarson (Chairman).

- Broder Daniel
- Marie Bergman
- Kai Gullmar
- Ted and Kenneth Gärdestad
- Doris
- Europe
- Titiyo

=== 2020 (April 17) ===
Svenska Musikskattens Hus did not induct any further artists in 2019 when CEO Charlotte Wiking passed away at the end of 2018. However, in 2020, new elected artists were inducted, with editor-in-chief Lars Nylin announced as the new jury chairman. New to the jury was the music journalists Petra Markgren Wangler and Stefan Wermelin.

- Tant Strul
- Pugh Rogefeldt
- Povel Ramel
- Martin "Max Martin" Sandberg
- Lill Lindfors
- Karin Dreijer
- Ingela "Pling" Forsman
- Infinite Mass
- Håkan Hellström
- Georg Riedel

=== 2021 (May 27) ===
- Py Bäckman
- Björn Skifs
- Bathory
- Timbuktu
- Lisa Nilsson

=== 2022 (June 15) ===
New additions to the jury were music journalist Alexandra Sundqvist and music editor Mathias Bridfelt.

- The Soundtrack of Our Lives
- Petter
- Monica Törnell
- Lars Gullin
- Brita Borg

=== 2023 (September 13) ===
- Ann-Louise Hanson
- Mando Diao
- Lena Willemark
- Jenny Wilson
- Tomas Ledin

=== 2024 (September 24) ===
The new chairman of the election jury is music editor Mathias Bridfelt. The jury consists of Alexandra Sundqvist and cultural journalists Ika Johannesson and Fredrik af Trampe.

- Ace of Base
- Lisa Ekdahl
- Eldkvarn
- José González
- Refused
- Alice Tegnér
- Freddie Wadling

=== 2025 (November 11) ===
The jury consisted of Fredrik af Trampe, Alexandra Sundqvist, Ika Johannesson, and Mathias Bridfelt (Chairman).

- Sahara Hotnights
- Peter LeMarc
- Laleh
- Jerry Williams
- Vikingarna
- Kjell Höglund
- Anti Cimex
- Sonya Hedenbratt
