= Evenemangsparken Södra Djurgården =

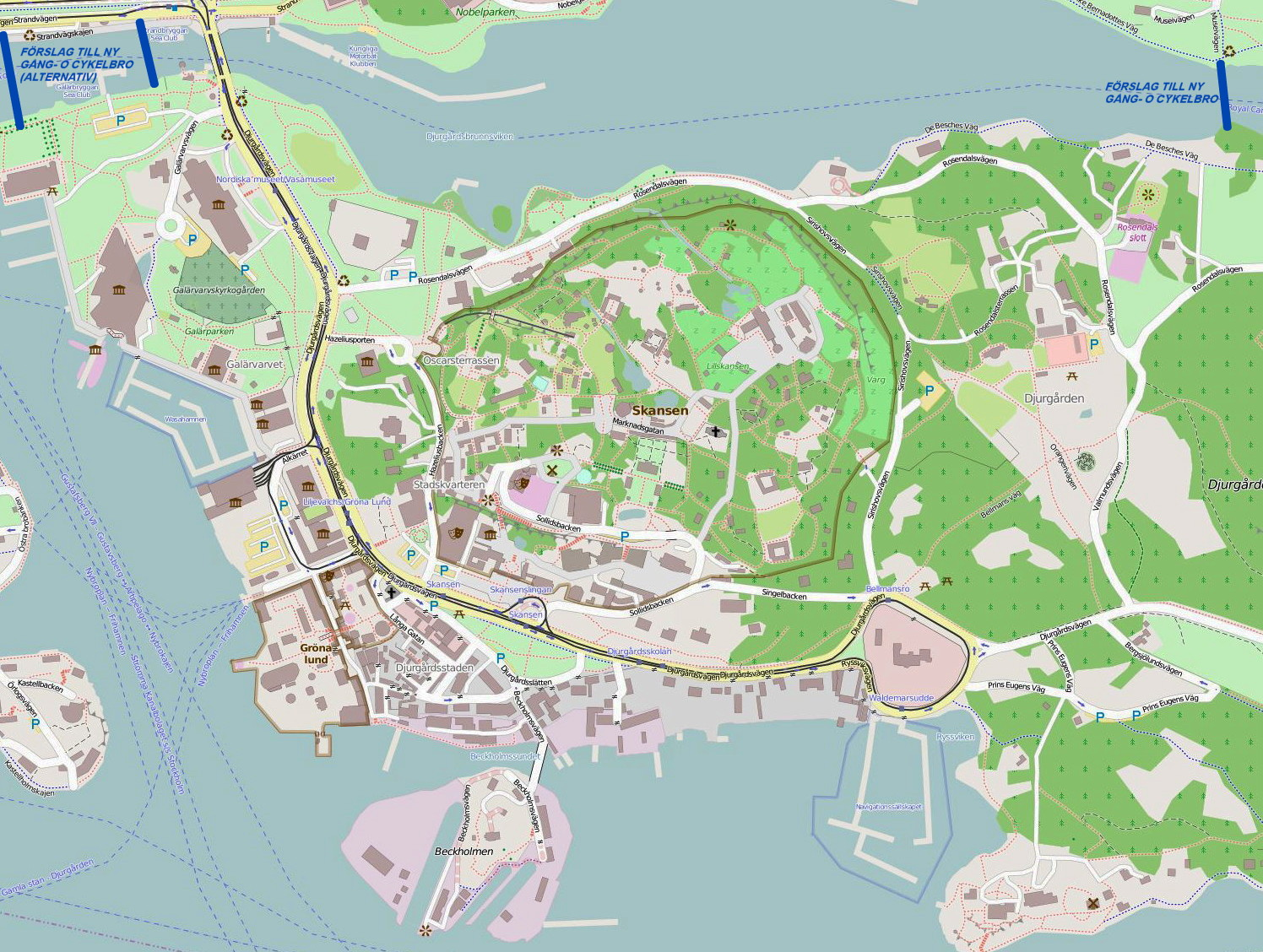
Area of the "Evenemangsparken Södra Djurgården".

Evenemangsparken Södra Djurgården consists of a number of present and future entertainment and meeting-places in Djurgården, Stockholm. In a land use from 2009 the Southern part of Djurgårdens west part has gotten the name "Evenemangsparken" (en: The events park). In a global comparison the Evenemangsparken is seen as a collected theme park and is the seventh largest in the world with approximately ten million visitors yearly.

== Overview ==
The southern part of Djurgården was in the 1800s an unbuilt meadow that was called "Slätten" and later "Djurgårdsslätten". In the mid-1800s a park was built and a number of houses, such as an inn, bars and other building were comedians, musicians and theater could be. The area later became the city of Stockholms main entertainment area.

Since then many more attractions has been built there, such as the Vasa museum in 1990, Junibacken in 1996 and Spritmuseum in 2012 and the ABBA museum in 2013.

== Some present time attractions ==
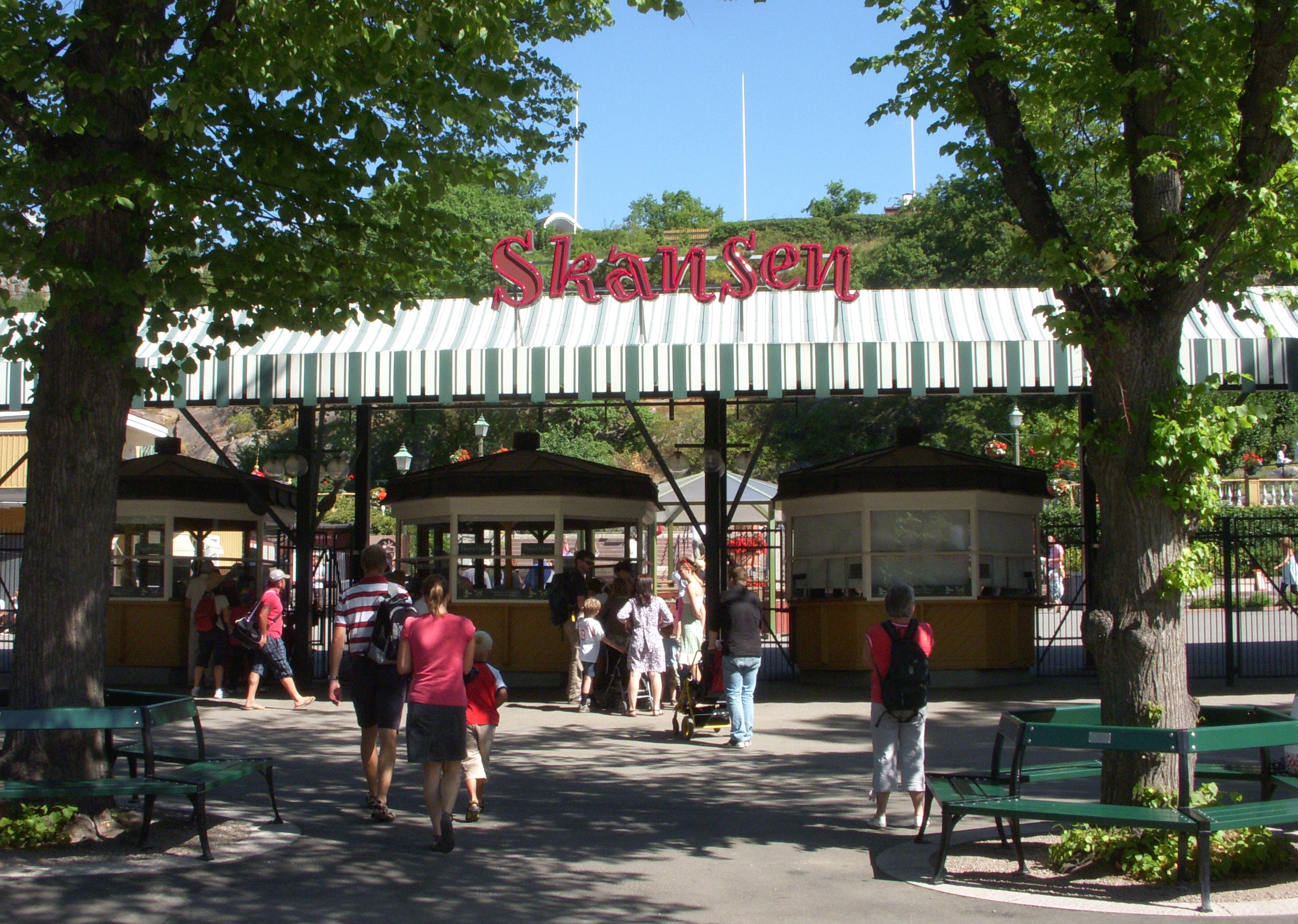
Skansens huvudentré

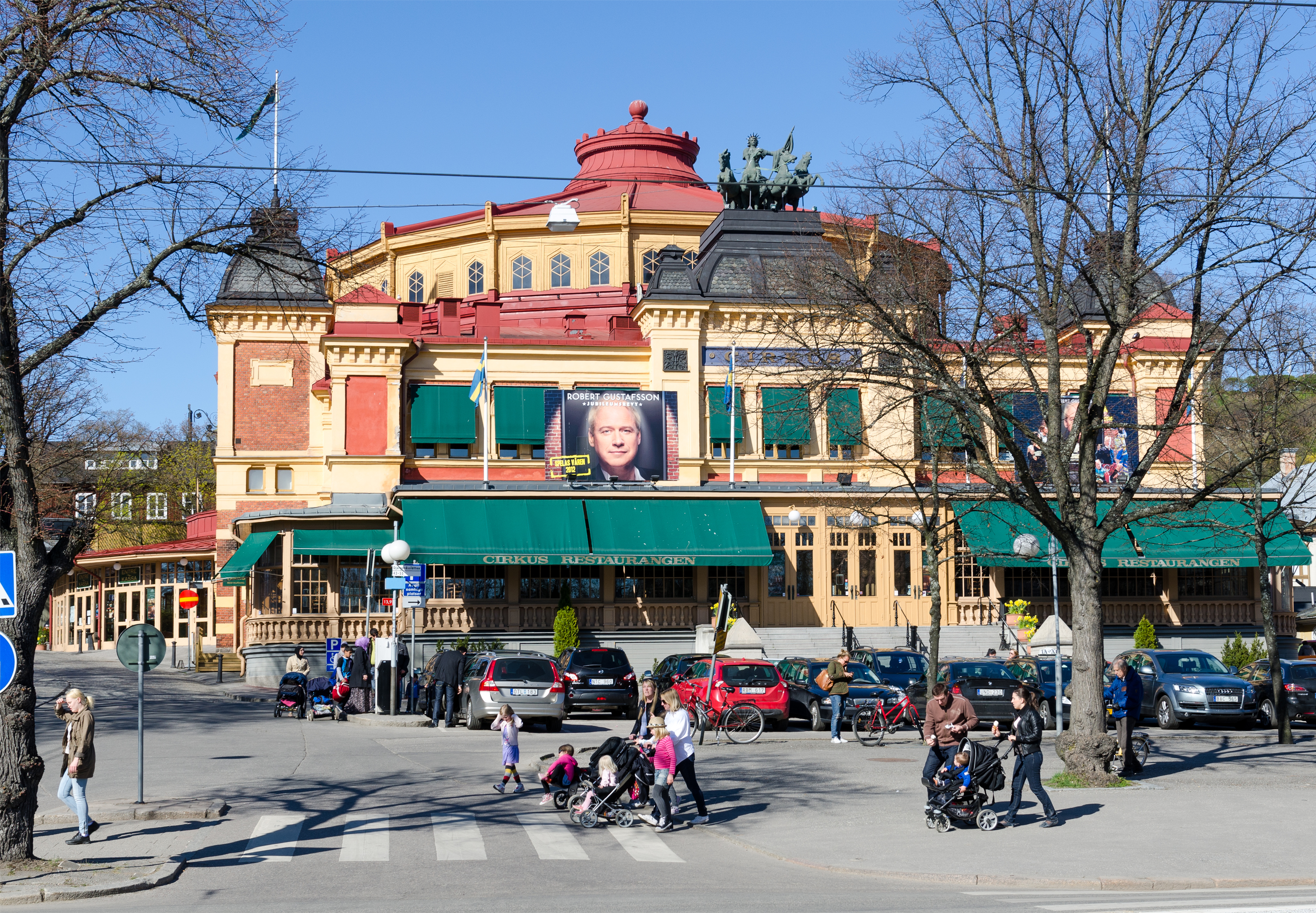
Cirkus towards Djurgårdsslätten

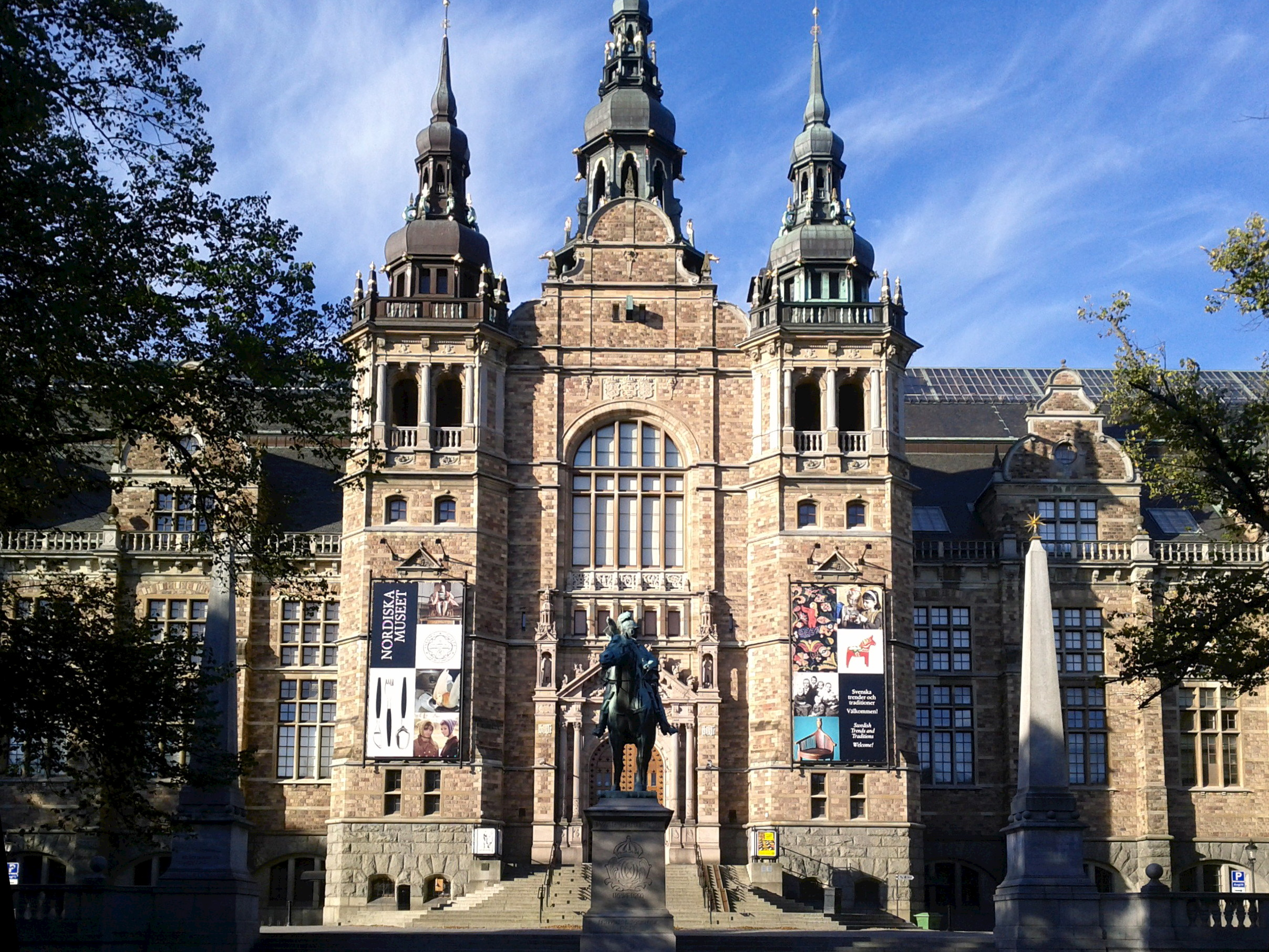
Nordiska museets main entrance

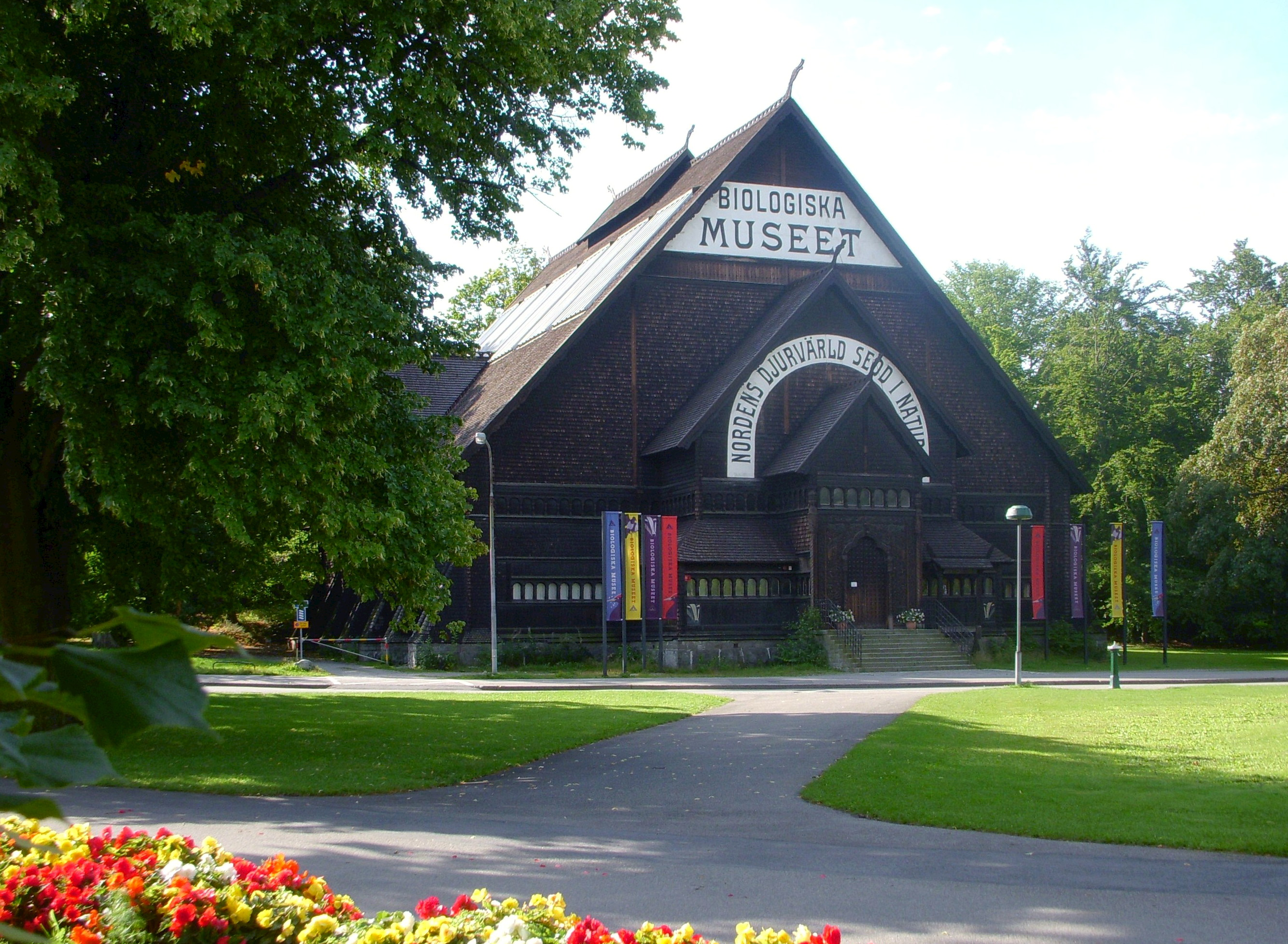
Biologiska museets building

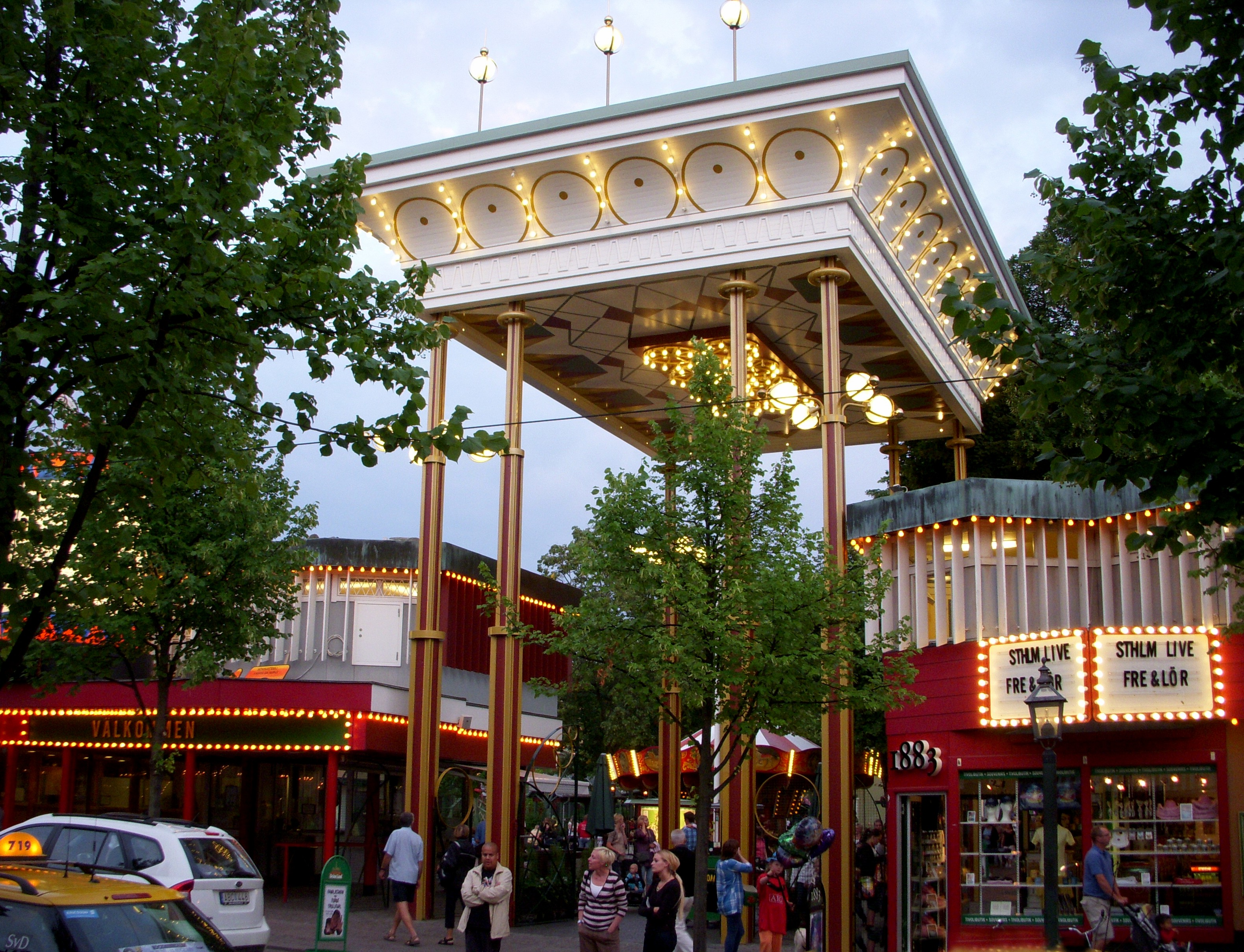
Gröna Lunds main entrance

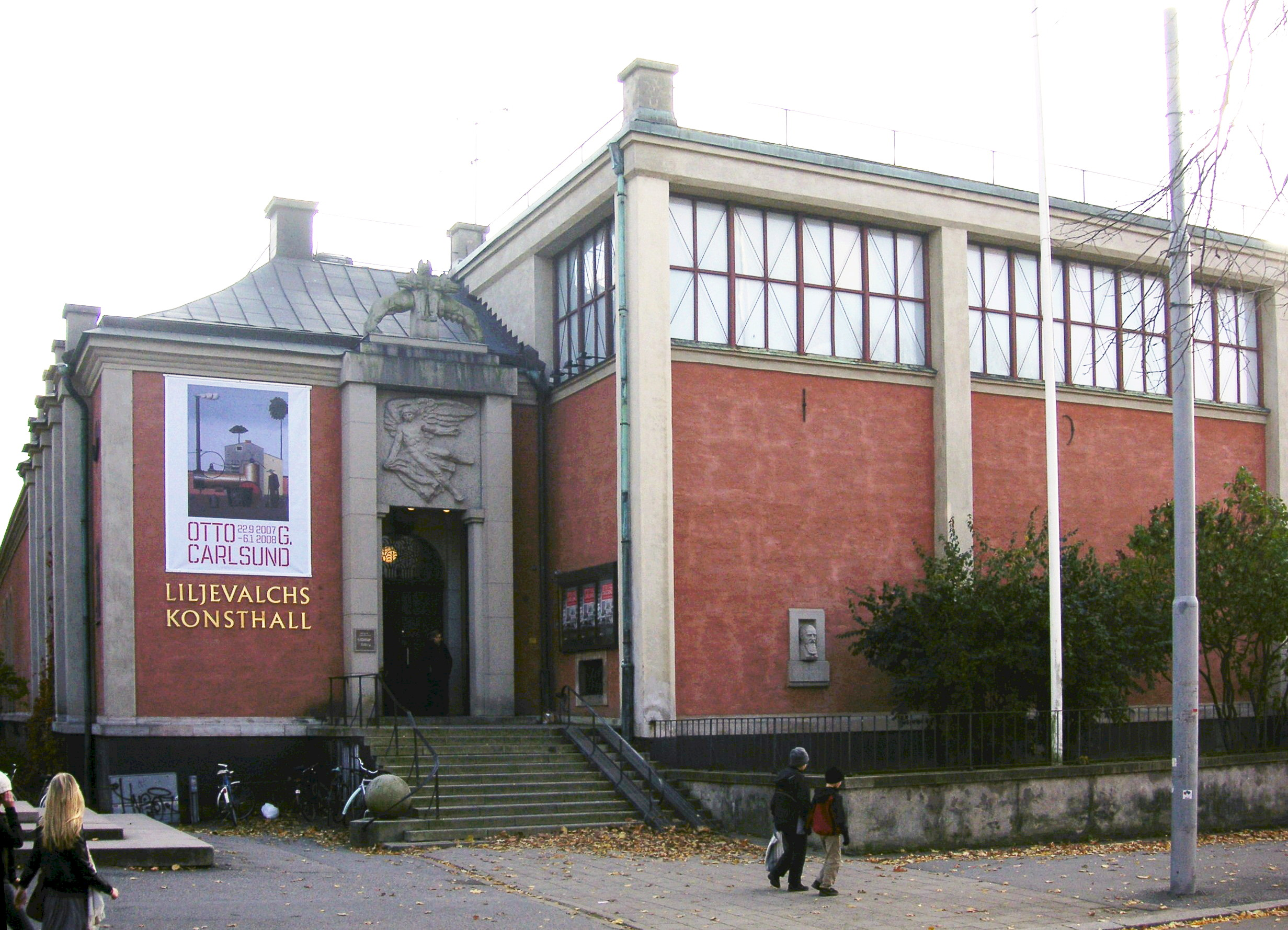
Liljevalchs konsthalls main entrance

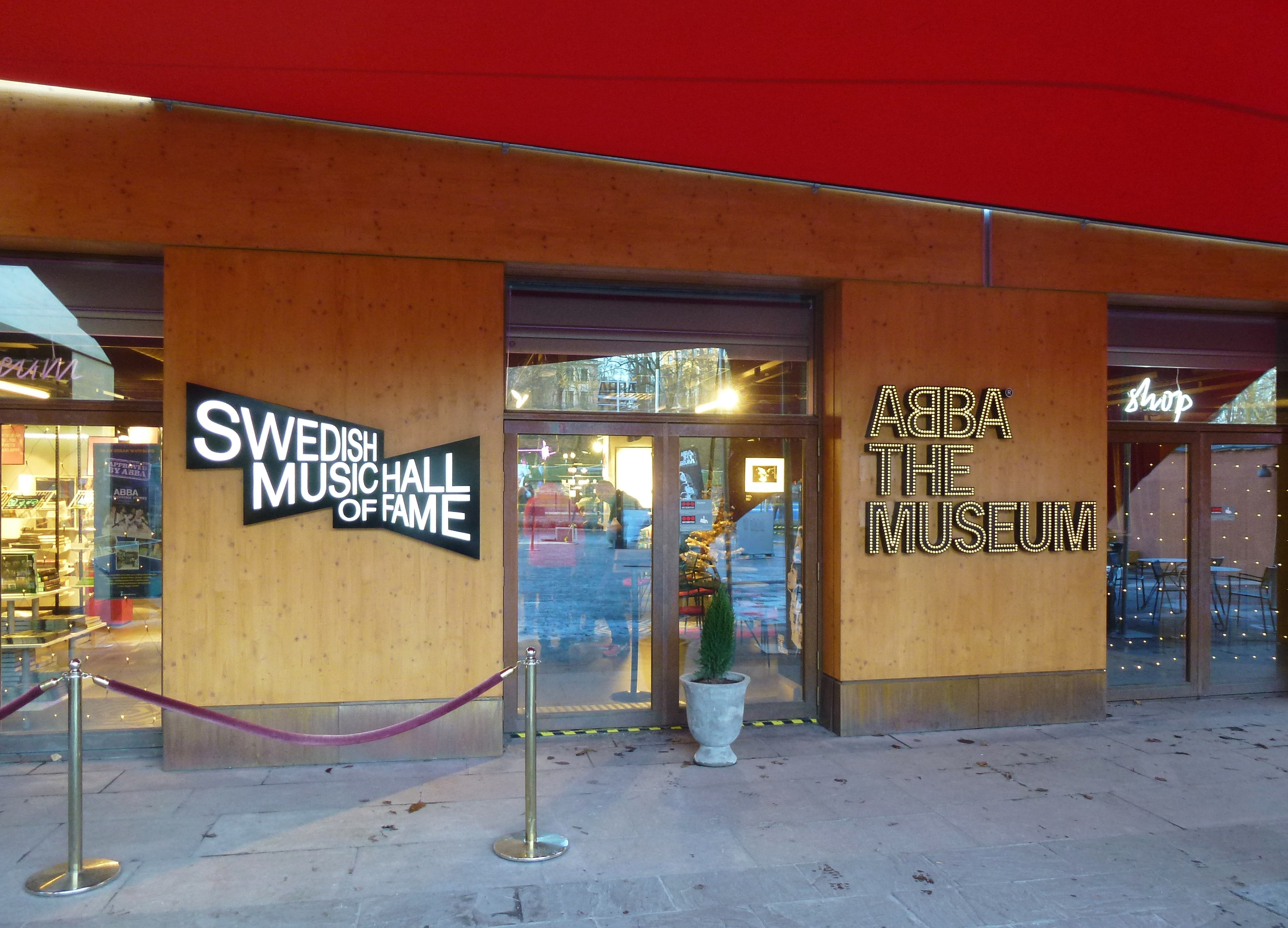
Main entrance to Abbamuseet and Swedish Music Hall of Fame

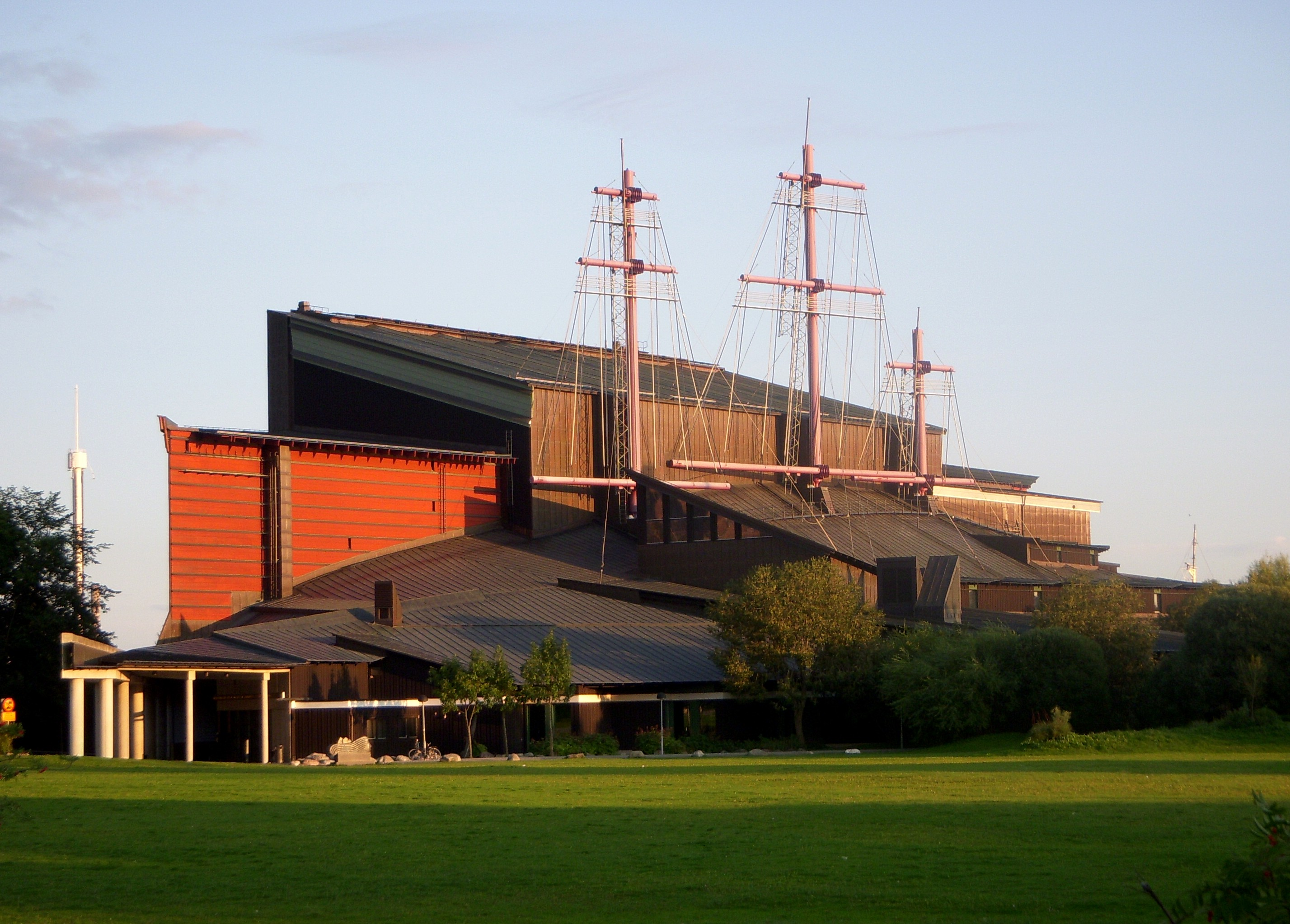
Vasamuseet,

== Future plans ==
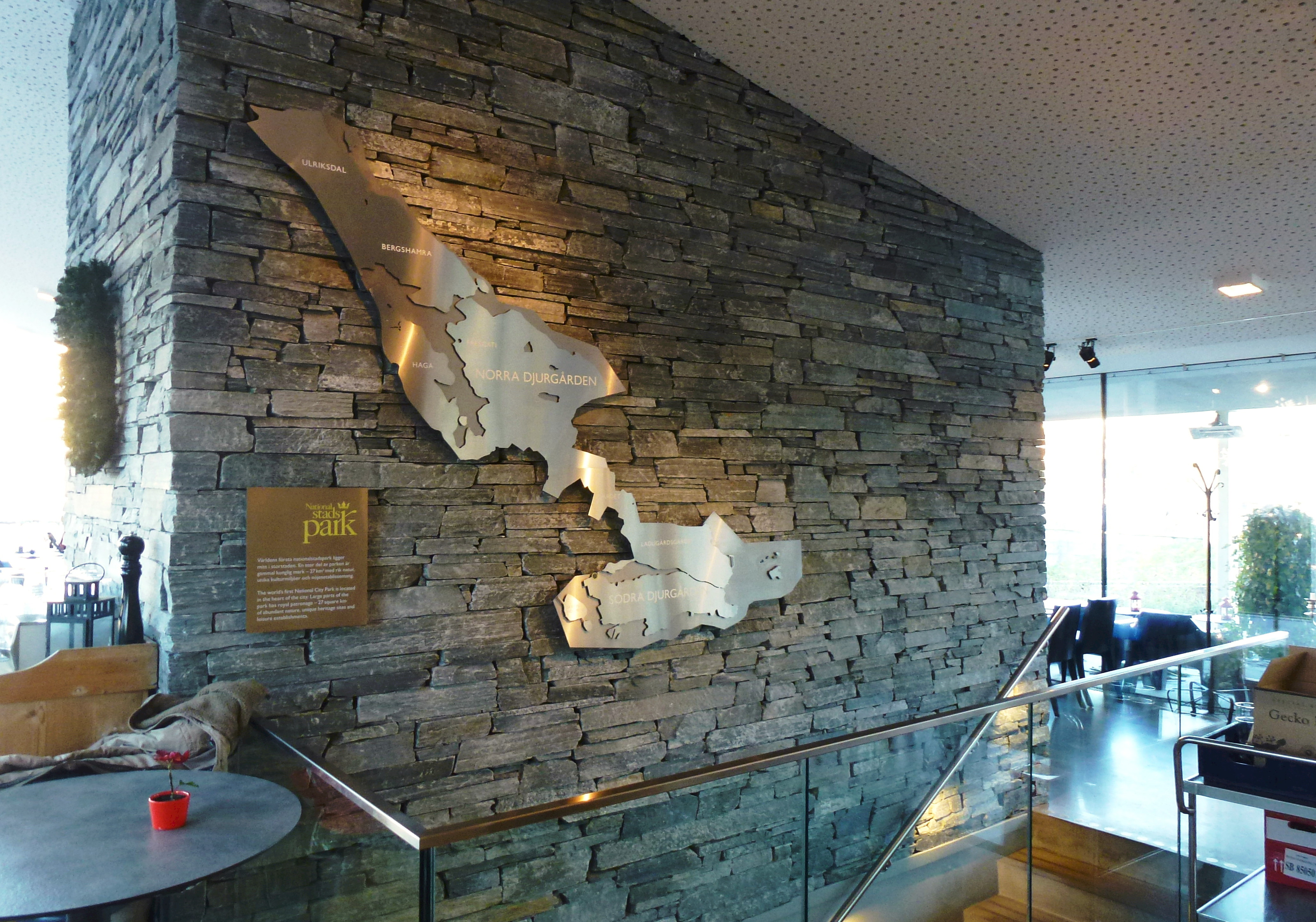
Map over Nationalstadsparken in the area 2014.

In late 2009 the city council of Stockholm accepted plans to create Kungliga nationalstadsparken. As a step to improve the accessibility for walker and cyclists between the northern and southern parts of Djurgården a new walking and cycling bridge or overwalk will be built that will connect Evenemangparken and Museiparken. The bridge will be completed in 2016.
