= Farah Abadi =

Swedish television presenter (born 1988)

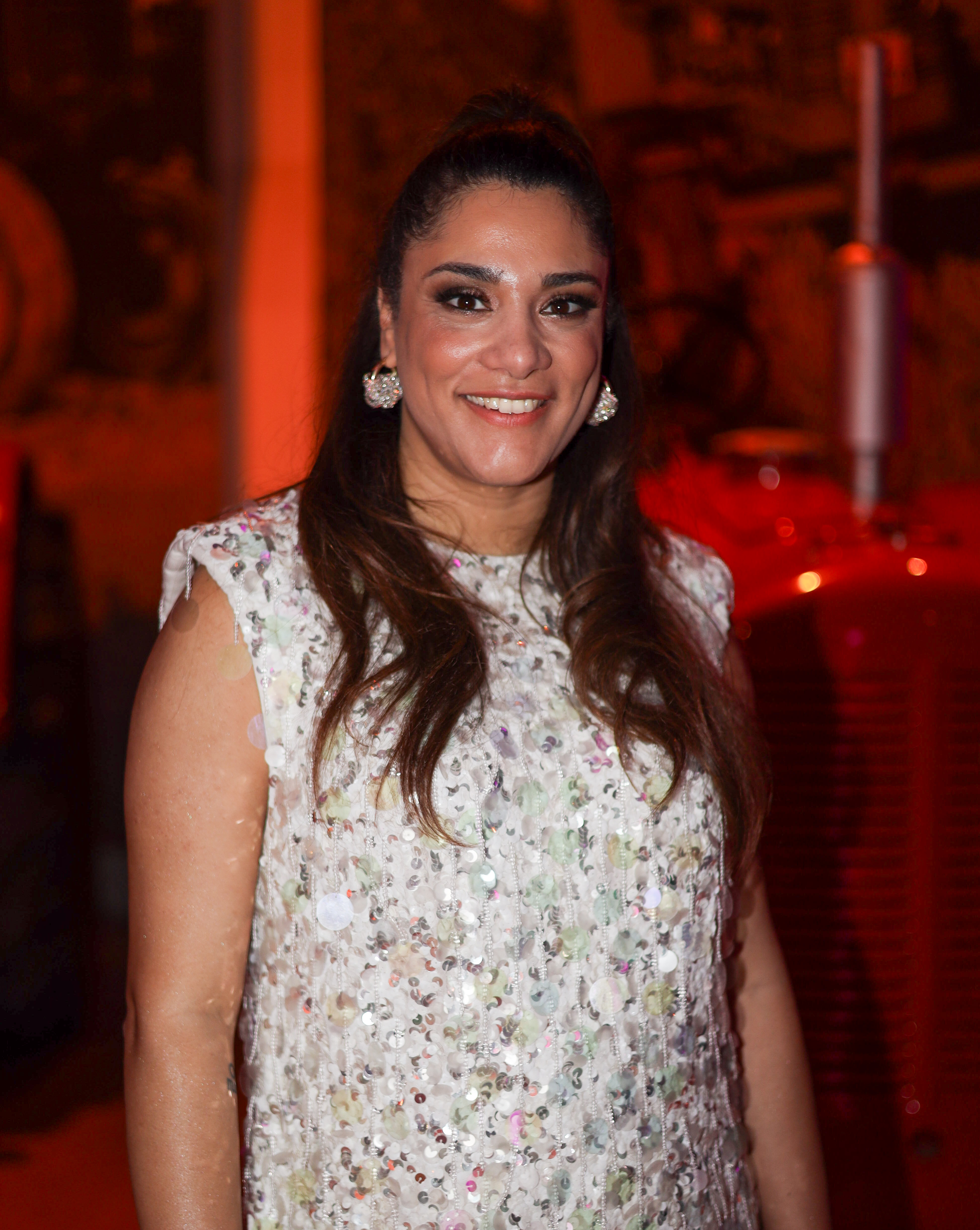
- Farah Abadi at Melodifestivalen 2024.
- Born: 18 January 1988 (age 38); Västervik, Sweden
- Occupations: Television presenter, radio host
- Years active: 2012–present
- Partner: Johan
- Children: 2

Farah Abadi (born 18 January 1988), briefly known as Farah Erichsén, is a Swedish television and radio presenter who works for Sveriges Television (SVT) and Sveriges Radio (SR).

== Personal life ==
Abadi was born in Västervik to Palestinian refugee parents who had arrived from Lebanon. Abadi received a bachelor's degree in media and communications, and later worked, among other things, as a communicator at the Swedish Transport Administration.

== Career ==
Between 2012 and 2014, she was a radio presenter for the Sveriges Radio station Din Gata 100,6 for local Malmö transmissions. She then made her television debut when she presented the kids summer show Sommarlov, broadcast on SVT, along with Malin Olsson, Rijal Mbamba and Alexander Hermansson. She co-hosted the show again in 2015, without Olsson.

Between 2014 and 2015, she presented her own show, P3 med Farah Abadi, on Sveriges Radio. In 2015, she was "public ambassador" during Musikhjälpen along with singer Oscar Zia. She also presented Morgonpasset on Sveriges Radio along with, among others, Arantxa Alvarez. In 2016, she was again public ambassador at Musikhjälpen, which that year was broadcast from Örebro.

During the Eurovision Song Contest 2016, Abadi was a reporter for the Swedish preview show called Studio Eurovision.

In December 2017, she was one of the presenters for Musikhjälpen in Umeå. She continued to present the program in 2018 from Lund, in 2019 from Västerås, and in 2020 from Stockholm.

Between February and March 2022, she co-hosted Melodifestivalen (the Swedish national selection for the Eurovision Song Contest) alongside Oscar Zia. Her role was primarily to interview the artists backstage during the course of the event, and for the final, she also appeared alongside Zia onstage. Abadi hosted Melodifestivalen 2023 alongside Jesper Rönndahl.

Abadi was the spokesperson for Sweden announcing the Swedish jury result in the final of Eurovision Song Contest 2023 on 13 May. She co-hosted the semi-final allocation draw for the Eurovision Song Contest 2024 that took place on 30 January. Farah Abadi and her partner Johan moved to a villa in Malmö in December 2024.
