= Musik ska byggas utav glädje =

Song by Lill Lindfors

from the album Du är det varmaste jag har
- Language: Swedish
- Released: 1978
- Genre: schlager
- Label: Metronome
- Songwriters: Björn Barlach, Åke Cato
- Composer: Lill Lindfors
- Producer: Anders Burman

Musik ska byggas utav glädje (literal English translation Music should be built by joy) is a song with lyrics by Björn Barlach and Åke Cato, and music by Lill Lindfors, and recorded by her on the 1978 album Du är det varmaste jag har, produced by Anders Burman.

The song was listed on the Swedish charts for four weeks from 8 to 29 October 1978, peaking at 7th position. In 2002, an instrumental cover version was recorded by Johan Stengård on the album Det vackraste.

Lill Lindfors also recorded the song with lyrics in English by Susanne Wigforss, My Joy is Building Bricks of Music, a version she performed when presenting the 1985 Eurovision Song Contest.
