= Kitty Jutbring =

Swedish DJ and television host

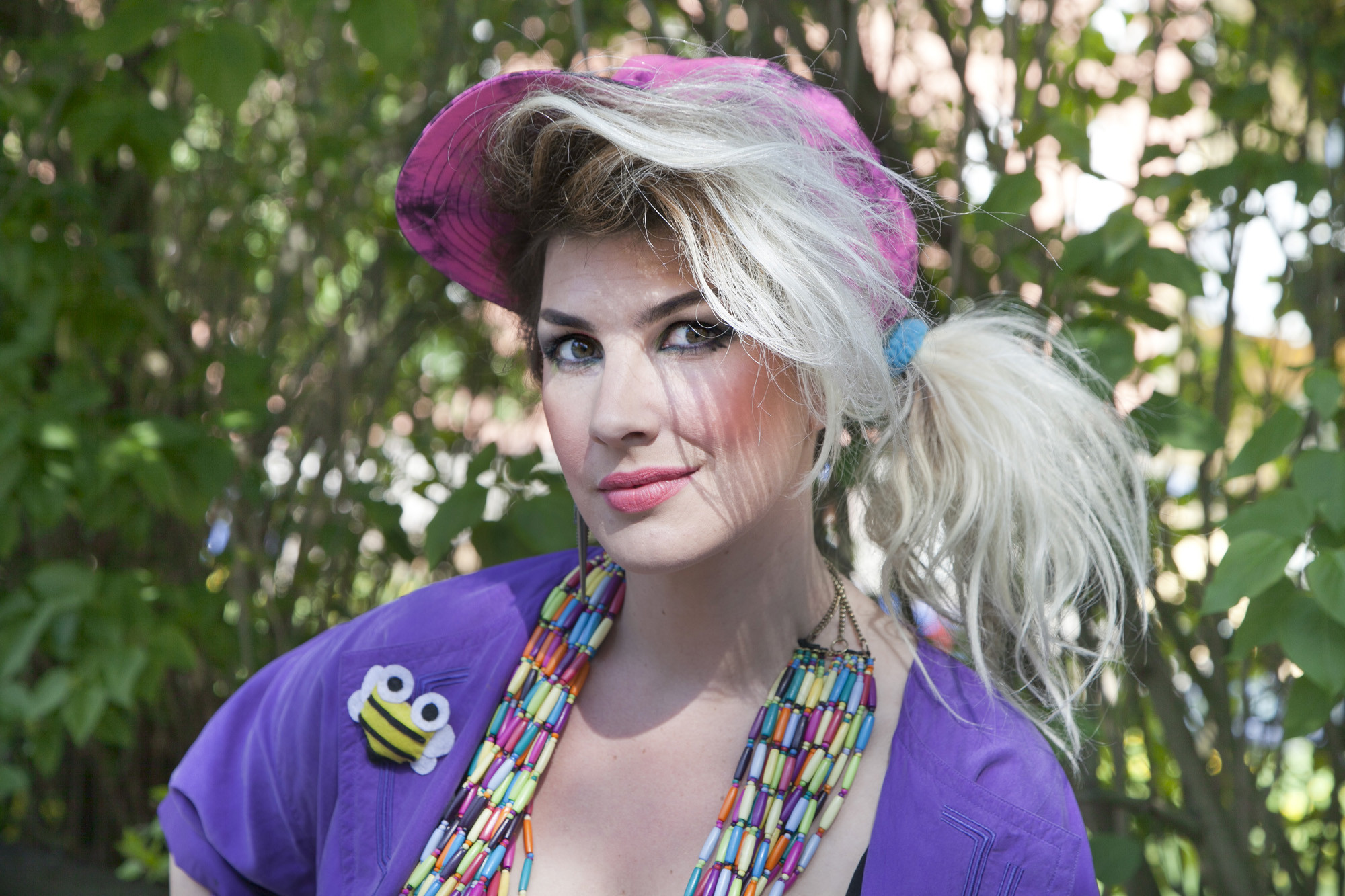
- Kitty Jutbring in 2012
- Born: Anna Maria Kitty Skura Jutbring; 8 May 1977 (age 49); Gothenburg, Sweden
- Occupations: Radio host, television host, singer

Anna Maria Kitty Skura Jutbring (born 8 April 1977) is a Swedish reality television contestant, radio and television host, singer and DJ. She became known in Sweden after being a housemate on Big Brother in 2002, and has since become a radio and television host by hosting shows on Sveriges Radio P3 and SVT. Jutbring has hosted shows like Musikhjälpen on television and Christer on radio.

== Career ==
In 1999, Jutbring won VeckoRevyn's competition "Plus Size Model of the Year". Jutbring became known in Sweden when she was a housemate in the second series of the Swedish version of the reality show Big Brother which was broadcast on Kanal5 in 2002. After that Jutbring participated in Fort Boyard on TV4 and Club Goa on TV3. Jutbring is also a member of her own band, Kitty & the K, who performed at the Hultsfred Festival in Hultsfred in 2005.

Jutbring is a radio host and has given relationship advice in the Sveriges Radio show Christer. She has hosted the show several times when the usual host was on vacation or on other radio duties. She is the host of the teen television show Hasses brorsas låtsassyrras kompis (Hasse's brother's stepsister's friend) on SVT and she has also hosted Bobster on Barnkanalen.

In 2008, Jutbring participated in the radio and television charity show Musikhjälpen, in the show's very first broadcast, with Henrik Torehammar and Ehsan Noroozi. For the show, Jutbring was locked inside a glasshouse and broadcast live radio for six days. Jutbring also participated as a celebrity dancer in Let's Dance 2009 on TV4.

In 2010, she participated in the winter game show Vinterspelen Åre 2010 on Kanal5, and in 2011 she was the host for the P3 Guld Awards on SVT. Since 2000, she has been a DJ and nightclub proprietor and owns several nightclubs around Sweden, mostly in Gothenburg, Malmö and Stockholm.

Jutbring has been an active proponent of feminism and equal opportunities for women. She has been particularly vocal regarding the situation of adolescent girls in Sweden regarding issues of body consciousness and sex. Jutbring has also been an active proponent of the new and controversial gender neutral personal pronoun hen.

== Personal life ==
At the end of 2012, Jutbring and her boyfriend Per Störby had their first child, a daughter.
