= Tina Mehrafzoon =

Swedish radio and television presenter

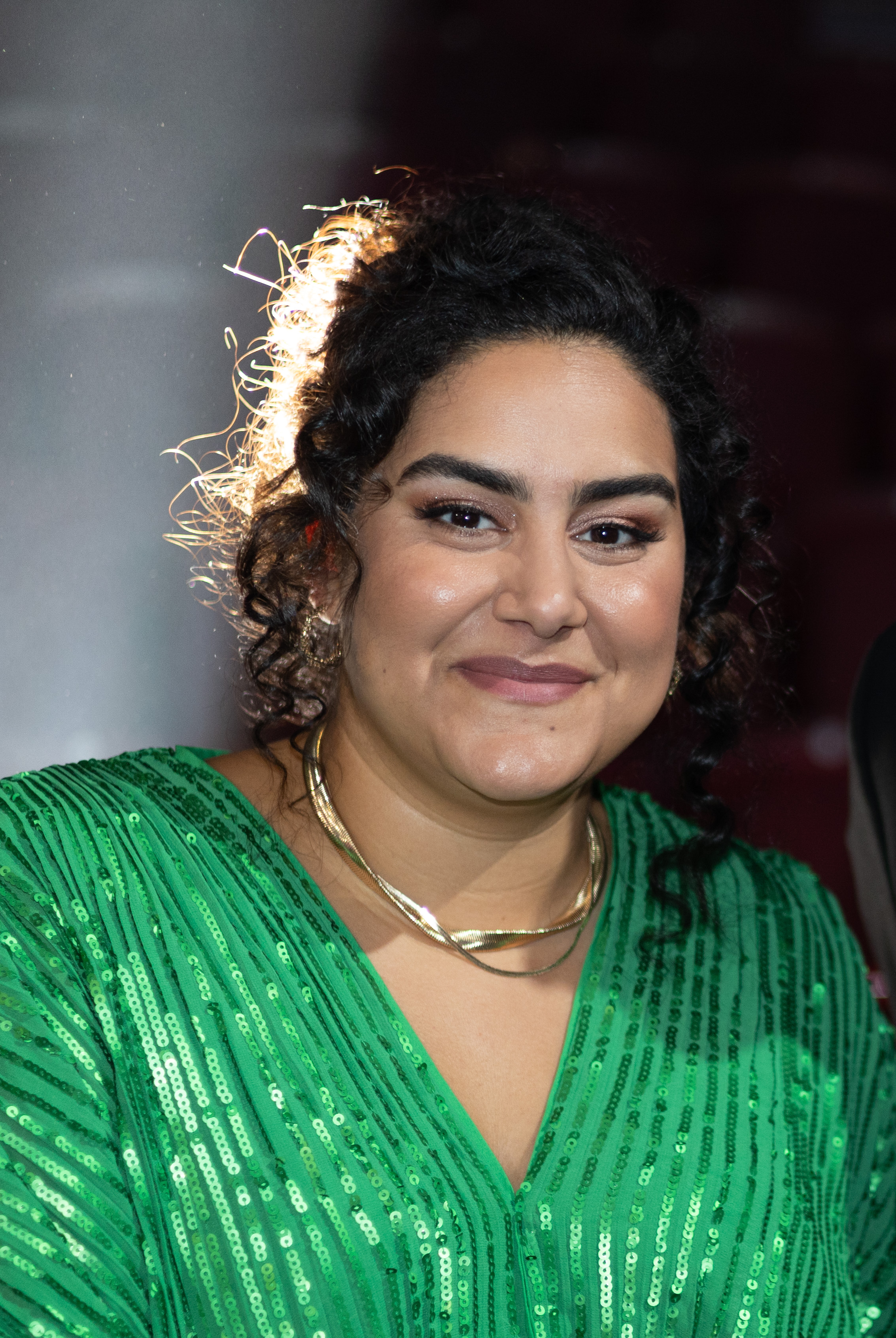
- Tina Mehrafzoon
- Born: 2 September 1990 (age 34); Enköping, Sweden

Tina Mehrafzoon (born 2 September 1990) is a Swedish radio and television presenter.

== Biography ==
Mehrafzoon has studied journalism at Lulea tekniska universitet, she has earlier worked for the SVT music show PSL, and as researcher for "Uppdrag granskning" on the same channel. Since 2013, she has presented "Musikguiden" on Sveriges Radio. In 2015, she presented the P3 Guld gala along with Kodjo Akolor.

In 2015, Tina Mehrafzoon competed in "På spåret" on SVT in team with Aino Trosell.

In 2022, Mehrafzoon presented "Musikhjälpen" along with Oscar Zia and Klas Eriksson.

She commentated both the semifinals and final of the Eurovision Song Contest 2024 along with Edward af Sillén for SVT.
