= Arantxa Alvarez =

Swedish television presenter and singer

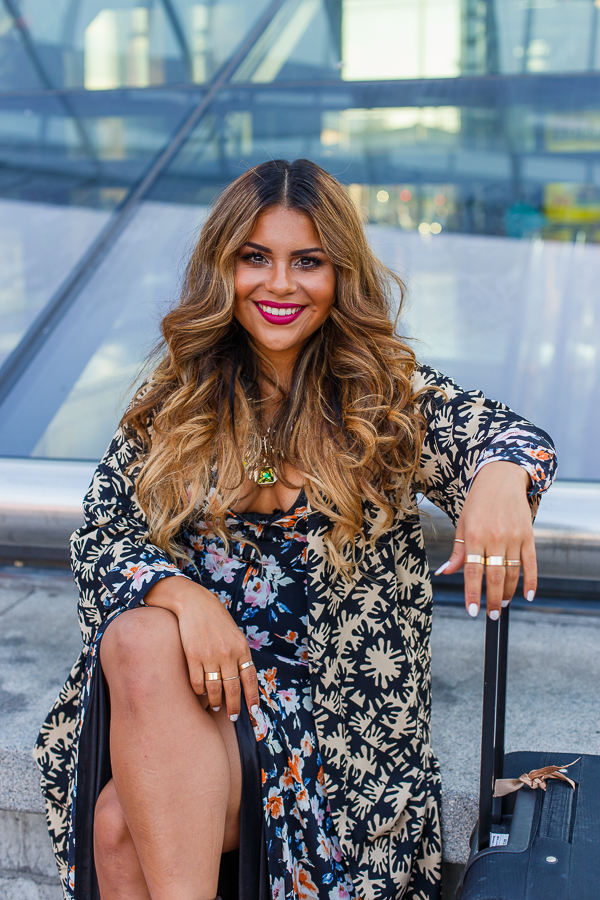
- Alvarez in 2015
- Born: Arantxa Isabel Álvarez Garri; 17 November 1991 (age 34); Norrköping, Sweden
- Occupations: Television presenter, radio talk-show host, singer
- Known for: Morgonpasset, Idol, Musikhjälpen, Big Brother
- Partner: Johan Bengtsson

Arantxa Isabel Álvarez Garri (born 17 November 1991) is a Swedish television presenter and singer. She grew up in Norrköping as her parents had fled Chile as refugees following the 1973 coup.

== Career ==
Alvarez participated in Idol 2013 broadcast on TV4 and made it to the Top 20. She was then eliminated during the Semi Final qualifying round. During the summer of 2014 she made her debut as a television presenter for the Sveriges Radio show Morgonpasset. She was also that year's "audience ambassador" in the aid show Musikhjälpen broadcast both on Sveriges Television and Sveriges Radio.

In the summer of 2015 she was again presenter of Morgonpasset on Sveriges Radio P3. During late 2015 she presented Idol Extra which was broadcast on TV4, and presented the show along with singer Erik Segerstedt. In the summer of 2016 she presented her third summer of Morgonpasset, this time along with Farah Abadi, Victor Linnér, Jonatan Unge and Simon Rosenqvist. In 2016, she also presented the children's show Morgonshowen on Barnkanalen. She was also a reviewer of comical videos for the Swedish version of Ridiculousness which premiered on MTV in August 2016.

In 2021, she became a co-presenter of Big Brother which is broadcast on Sjuan.

In 2023, Alvarez was a guest celebrity judge in the episode Snatch Game - Sverige Season 1 of the Swedish language reality television series Drag Race Sverige broadcast on SVT1 and SVT Play.

In January 2025, it was announced that Alvarez would be participating in that year's edition of Let's Dance.
