= Daniel Hallberg =

Swedish comedian and television presenter

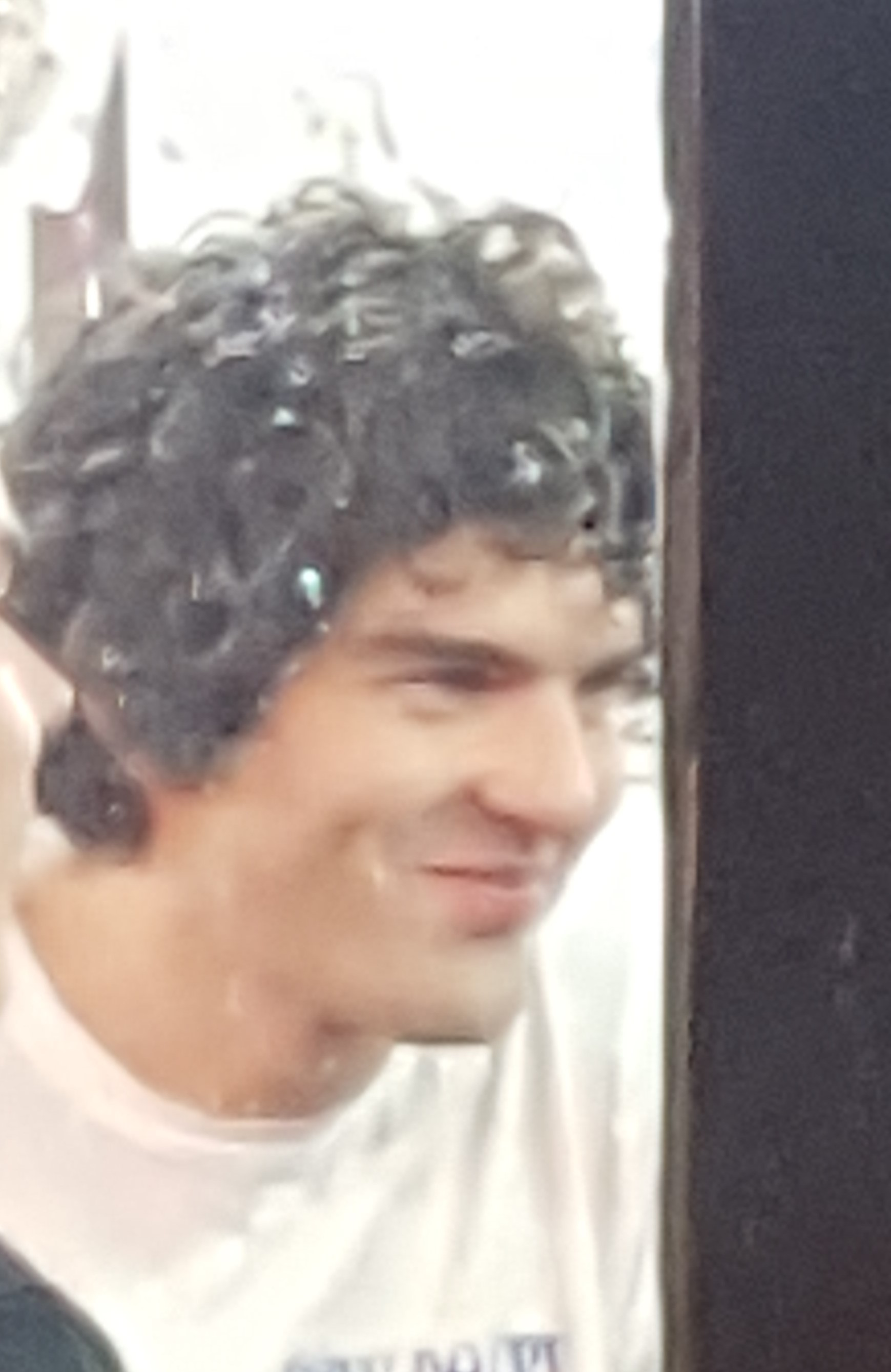
Daniel Hallberg at Musikhjälpen 2019

Daniel Hallberg (born 30 September 1987) is a Swedish comedian and television presenter.

In 2019, Hallberg presented Grammisgalan 2019 along with Rennie Mirro. Hallberg has participated in the stage show and later on the talk show television version of Luuk & Hallberg along with Kristian Luuk which has been broadcast on SVT.

Hallberg presented Musikhjälpen 2019, which were broadcast on Sveriges Radio and SVT.
