= Peps Persson =

Swedish blues and reggae musician (1946–2021)

- Born: Per-Åke Tommy Persson; 20 December 1946; Helsingborg, Sweden
- Died: 27 June 2021 (aged 74); Vittsjö, Sweden
- Other name: Peps Persson
- Occupations: Singer; songwriter; musician
- Years active: 1966–2021
- Musical career
- Genres: Progg; blues; reggae; roots rock
- Instruments: Vocals; guitar; harmonica

Per-Åke Tommy Persson (20 December 1946 – 27 June 2021), known by the stage name Peps Persson, was a Swedish blues and reggae musician and social critic from Tjörnarp, Scania. Throughout his career he mostly made music in Swedish and was well known for his Scanian dialect. At an earlier stage he made a few albums in English. His songs from the 1970s have become Swedish classics, including "Falsk matematik", which was number-one on Svensktoppen for 15 weeks.

Persson was the recipient of an honorary award at the Grammis ceremony in 2007, and was inducted into the Swedish Music Hall of Fame in 2015.

== Career ==
Persson was born on 20 December 1946 in Helsingborg and grew up in Tjörnarp. His first band, Pop Penders, was started in 1962. He later formed Peps Blues Quality together with Blues Quality. Persson's career up to 1975 was mostly inspired by the blues, and he's known for having reworked many famous blues and reggae tunes into Swedish, by such artists as Muddy Waters, Elmore James and Bob Marley.

After 1975, his career turned away from the blues and focused mostly on reggae. Some of his songs, like "Falsk matematik" and "Hög standard", made a political statement, and were considered part of the progg movement.

Persson died on 27 June 2021, at the age of 74, at his home in Vittsjö.

== Discography ==
=== Solo career ===
- Blues Connection (1968)
- The Week Peps Came to Chicago (1972)
- Blues på svenska (1975)
- Rotrock (1980) – No. 23 in Sweden
- En del och andra (1984) – No. 49 in Sweden
- Oh Boy (1992)

=== Peps Blue Quality ===
- Sweet Mary Jane (1969)

=== Peps Perssons Blodsband ===
- Blodsband (1974)
- Hög standard (1975)
- Droppen urholkar stenen (1976)
- Spår (1978)
- Fram med pengarna! (1988)
- Spelar för livet (1993)
- Röster från Södern (1994) – No. 1 in Sweden
- Rotblos (1997) – No. 32 in Sweden
- Äntligen! (2005)

=== With Pelle Perssons Kapell ===
- Fyra tunnlann bedor om dan (1977)
- Persson sjonger Persson! (1982)

=== Compilations ===
- Bitar 1968–1992 (1993) – No. 29 in Sweden
- Bästa (2004) – No. 59 in Sweden
- Oh Boy! – Det bästa med Peps Persson (2006) – No. 2 in Sweden

=== Singles ===
- "Oh Boy!" (1992) – No. 43 in Sweden

== Curiosity ==
The picture on the cover of the album Hög standard shows the band sitting in the back seat of a car with a private driver and drinking coffee. The picture on the cover of ABBA's album ABBA shows the band sitting in the back seat of a car with a private driver and drinking champagne.
