= Ametist Azordegan =

Iranian-born Swedish journalist and presenter

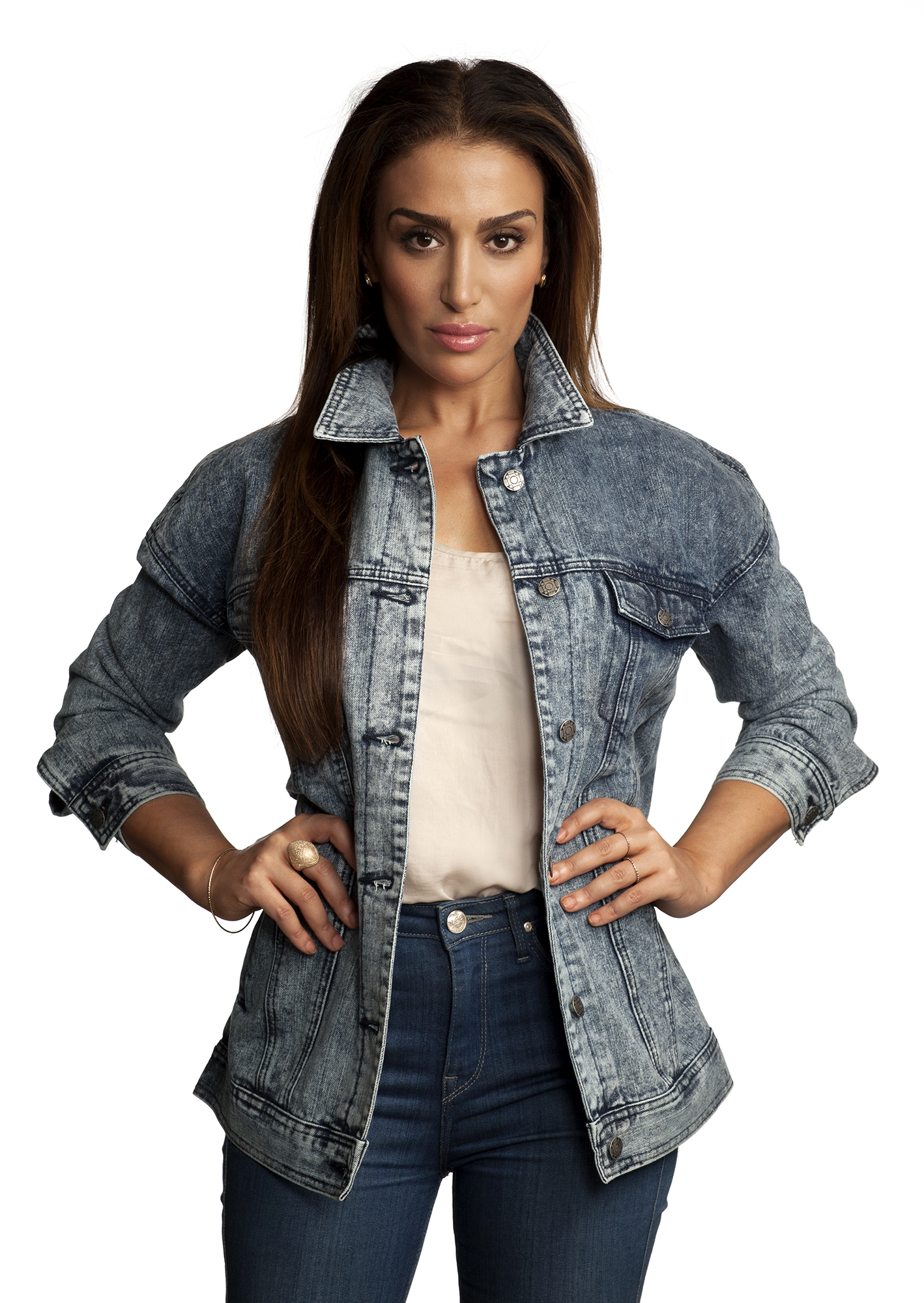
- Ametist Azordegan (2013)
- Born: 1 July 1980 (age 46); Tehran, Iran
- Occupations: Journalist, radio presenter
- Known for: Kvällstoppen, Pop i fokus, En kärleksattack på svensk hiphop

Ametist Azordegan (Persian: آمتیس آزوردگان, born 1 July 1980) is a Swedish journalist, television presenter and radio presenter. She was born in Tehran, Iran, but left (along with her family) in 1986, and studied journalism in Stockholm (with a specialty in music journalism). She presented the Sveriges Radio music show En kärleksattack på svensk hiphop between 2007 and 2014, which was broadcast on P3 and SR Metropol. Since 2013, she has been a reviewer for different cultural events for Sveriges Radios P1, P2 and P3. She was a member of The Swedish Music Hall of Fame 2014 award jury.

Azordegan has worked for SVT since 1999 on the music show Kvällstoppen, Pop i fokus along with Per Sinding-Larsen and Fredrik Lindström. She has earlier worked as a reviewer in music for the papers City and Gaffa, and also on and off reviewer for Metro and Sonic, and has also written music articles for Göteborgs-Posten. Azordegan and actor Mikael Tornving were suspended from their work at Sveriges Radio during a period ahead of the 2010 Swedish general election after breaking the station's policy by openly showing their political views. Azordegan participated in a campaign film against far-right parties. After rapper Adam Tensta left TV4's studio show Nyhetsmorgon in protest against perceived racism in 2015, Azordegan wrote a column about her belief that the channel lacks in understanding about racism.

Since 2014, she has been writing a history book about Swedish hip hop music. The book was published by Natur & Kultur and released in 2017. At the 2015 Kingsizegala, she won the award of Original of the year, an award that is given to a person or network that works to promote the Swedish hip hop music and scene.
