= Brita Zackari =

Swedish scriptwriter and television presenter

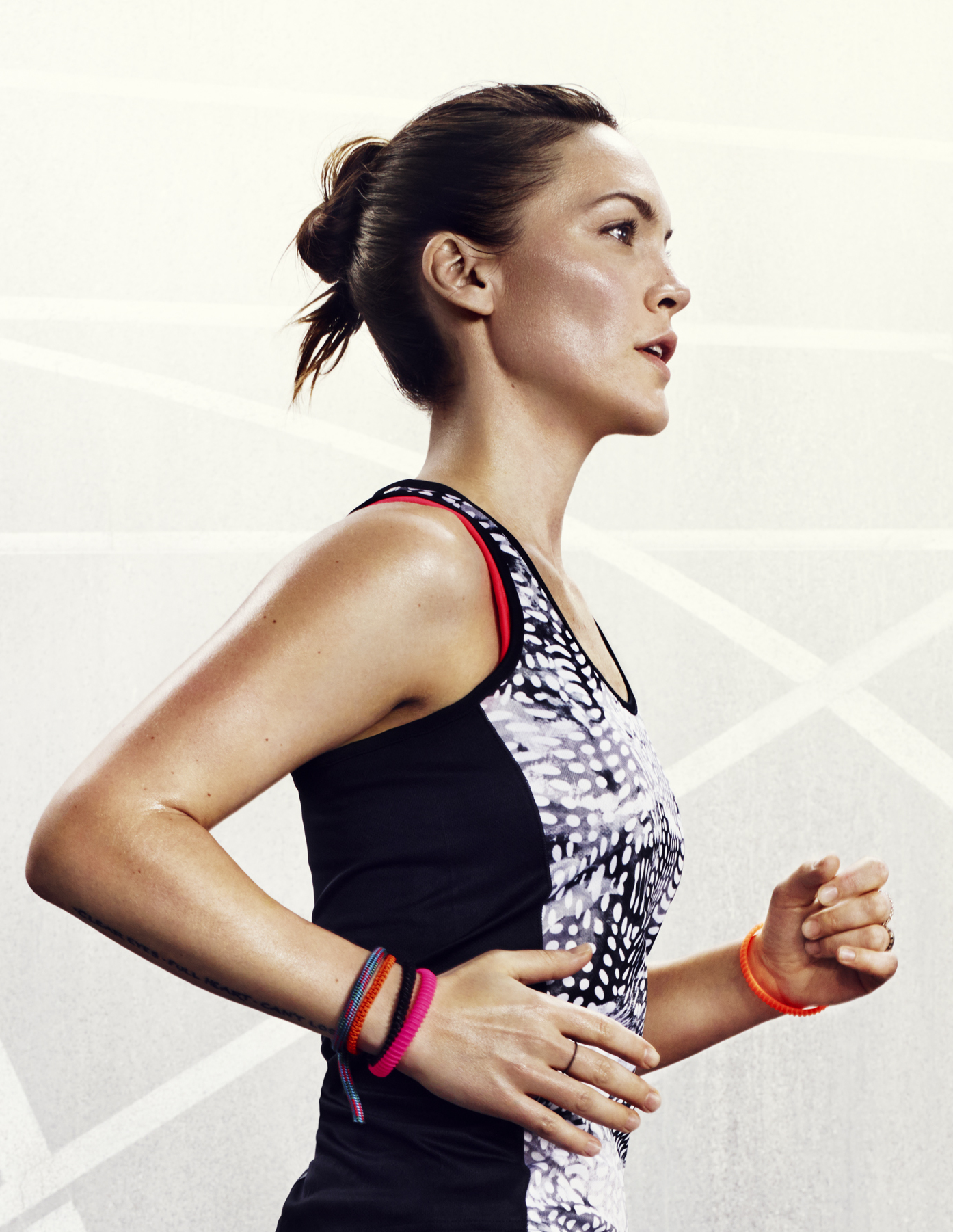
- Zackari in 2014
- Born: Brita Amanda Katarina Zackari; 13 June 1982 (age 43); Umeå, Sweden
- Occupation(s): Television presenter, scriptwriter
- Spouse: Kalle Zackari Wahlström (m. 2011)
- Children: 2

Brita Amanda Katarina Zackari (born 13 June 1982) is a Swedish scriptwriter and television presenter.

Zackari got her education at Berghs School of Communication and has worked as a copywriter at the PR firm McCann Stockholm. She has worked for Nöjesguiden and Schulman Show. Along with her husband Kalle Zackari Wahlström, Mikael Syrén and Johan Johansson she wrote the script for the comedy series Söder om Folkungagatan, which had its premiere on Kanal 5 during 2014.

During 2013 and 2014, she presented the Rix Morronzoo morning show on Rix FM along with Adam Alsing and Marko Lehtosalo.

In late 2014, she along with Felix Herngren presented the show Inte OK which was broadcast on TV3. In 2015, she presented Flickvän på försök which was broadcast on SVT.
