= Per Sinding-Larsen =

Swedish music journalist

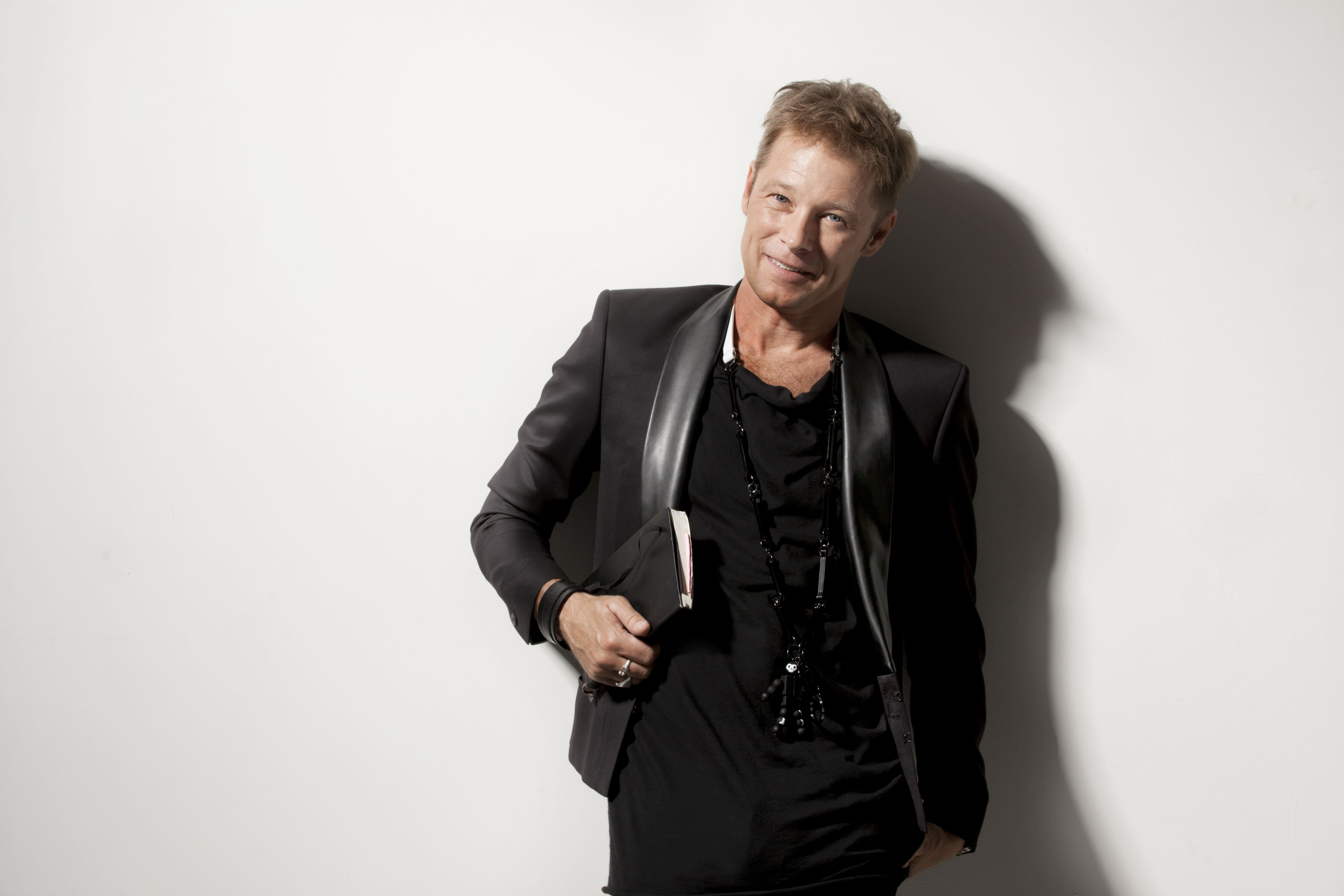
- Born: Per Kristofer Sinding-Larsen; 6 September 1965 (age 60); Sövde, Sweden
- Occupations: Journalist, television presenter and singer
- Known for: Studio Pop, Kulturnyheterna

Per Kristofer Sinding-Larsen (born 6 September 1965) is a Swedish grammy awarded journalist, television presenter and singer. He is most known for presenting the music show Studio Pop which was broadcast on SVT and a music reviewer for the culture show Kulturnyheterna also at SVT. He has also produced the two music documentaries Så nära får ingen gå – ett år med Kent and Vi är inte längre där (Sista åren med Kent) about the music group Kent. Between 2007 and 2014, he founded and ran the web and TV project PSL for SVT. PSL did start again 2018 and cover the music scene in Sweden and around the world.

== Biography ==
Sinding-Larsen was born in Sövde and started as a music reviewer at the age of sixteen for the newspaper Ystads Allehanda. He was one of the original television presenters and reporters at the start of the music channel ZTV in 1991, where he interviewed musicians such as Bruce Springsteen, David Bowie, Led Zeppelin, Metallica, and Madonna.

Sinding-Larsen has played in a number of rock bands, amongst them Doktor Glas and ZTX, and has also performed as an opera singer at Ystadsoperan, including Verdi's Luisa Miller and Korngold's Den döda staden. He has been the master of ceremonies for the Roskilde Festival Orange Scene since 2001.

In 2009, he and Kristian Luuk were the presenters of the music show Popcirkus on SVT. In 2012 he celebrated thirty years as a music reviewer by presenting the shows Sinding Sessions, Direkt från Summerburst, and Studio PSL on SVT. He also commentated during the live remembrance concert for the victims of the 2011 Utöya massacre for SVT.

In 2014, Sinding-Larsen presented the show Jakten på Norge 1814–2014, which was produced and aired by Norwegian broadcaster NRK. In 2016, he premiered two new films about the rock band Kent, in 2018 he premiered the film "Hertigen & Organismen" and started up PSL again as the TV-channel svtplay.se/psl with interviews (Juice WRLD, Christine & The Queens, 070 Shake and St Vincent amongst them). In 2020, he will release a film about the swedish rapper Z.E.

Per Sinding-Larsen has also been acting over the years. He had a role as a journalist in youthmovie "30 November" (1994) and in the biopic about swedish singer Ted Gärdestad "Ted – för kärlekens skull" (2016). He has also played a part as a Norwegian skier in romcom "Tills Frank Skiljer Oss Åt" (2022) and as a musicjournalist in "Nova & Alice" (2024).

== Honors and awards ==
In 2006, Larsen produced and made the report series Musikministeriet for SVT and was awarded the Stora Journalistpriset and also Ikarospriset. He has been voted the Best dressed man in Sweden by the men's magazine Café in 2005, Elle in 2006 and was amongst the Swedish fashion power people when the fashion magazine King made its list in 2009. In 2021, he received a swedish grammy award. 2022 hev received an award by the american magazine My New York for his work with music.In 2025 he received the honorary prize from the biggest music paper in the nordics, Gaffa Magazine. In 2025 he also received the prize Guldörat from Live at Heart-festival in Örebro.

== Television ==
- ZTV Nytt 1992–1997
- Tryck Till (ZTV) 1994–1997
- Hej Fredag! (Kanal 5) 1998
- Rock (with Henrik Schyffert) (SVT 2000)
- Kvällstoppen (with Fredrik Lindström) (SVT 2000)
- Pop i fokus (SVT 2001–2002)
- Så nära får ingen gå – ett år med Kent (SVT 2001)
- Studio Pop (SVT 2002–2005)
- Kulturnyheterna (SVT 2002–)
- Good Times Bad Times – Led Zeppelin (SVT 2002)
- Dream Baby Dream – Bruce Springsteen (SVT 2005)
- Musikministeriet (SVT 2006)
- Popcirkus (SVT 2009)
- PSL på Festival (SVT 2010)
- PSL på Summerburst (SVT 2012)
- Sinding Sessions (SVT 2012 / 2014)
- Jakten på Norge (NRK 2014)
- Studio PSL (SVT 2014)
- Vi är inte längre där – Sista åren med Kent part I and II (SVT 2016)
- Hertigen & Organismen (SVT 2018)
- PSL (SVT 2007–2014, 2018–2024)
