= P3 Din Gata =

Hip hop focused Swedish radio station

P3 Din Gata is a Swedish radio station owned by Sveriges Radio and produced in Malmö, Stockholm and Gothenburg. It airs on an FM transmitter over Malmö, but is also available on the Internet. The station has a focus on hip hop music.

It launched on 6 March 2006, when it took over a frequency previously occupied by the local channel P2 Musik, with a goal of reaching young women and immigrants. At launch the station used a jingle claiming "Alla talar Skånska" (Everyone speaks Scanian), referring to hosts being from Scania and speaking the local dialect. Until 2021 programming was produced exclusively in Malmö, with this slogan being part of a targeting primarily at residents of Malmö. In 2019 Sveriges Radio announced a plan to rework Din Gata from its focus on Malmö to a national one, along with a more direct focus on hip hop. The COVID-19 pandemic resulted in delays to this plan, with the new format being fully implemented in January 2021.

There were also plans to launch the channel in Gothenburg and Stockholm. In Gothenburg, these plans had to be scrapped due to a frequency shortage while in Stockholm, SR Metropol was launched. The channel has been criticized by the commercial broadcasters who claim the station competes with them, specifically The Voice Hiphop & RnB network.
