= Branting =

Branting is a surname. Notable people with the surname include:

- Anna Branting (1855–1950), Swedish journalist and writer
- Georg Branting (1887–1965), Swedish politician and fencer
- Hjalmar Branting (1860–1925), Swedish politician and Prime Minister of Sweden
- Kurt Branting (1900–1958), Swedish sprinter
- Sonja Branting (1890–1981), Swedish lawyer and politician
- Steven Branting (1947- ), American educator and historian
