= Admission to practice law by country =

An admission to practice law is a licensing to work as a lawyer. The process and operations of the admission to practice law varies between countries.

== Africa ==
=== Algeria ===
Those wishing to obtain a law degree must have Algerian nationality, be at least 23 years old, possess at least a bachelor's degree in law or equivalent degree in Islamic law, have a certificate of competency for the legal profession, and enjoy full political and civil rights without any convictions for a crime of dishonesty.

=== Angola ===
Angolan nationals and foreigners who wish to practice law must complete a law degree from an Angolan university and then take the National Exam for Admission to Advocacy. The regulations that establish that citizens admitted to the study of individuals accept foreign countries, on an equal basis, Angolan graduates. The Order of Attorneys of Angola is an organization of lawyers and responsible for the regulation of the legal profession in the country.

=== Egypt ===
To earn a law license, applicants must have Egyptian nationality, full civil capacity, not have any disciplinary findings against them, and be of good conduct and reputation. They are required to earn a law degree from an Egyptian university or a degree from a foreign university which is considered equivalent under Egyptian law, pass a medical examination to ensure fitness for the practice of the profession, and pay the registration fees and annual subscriptions required by law. After an applicant obtains a law degree, he or she must then undertake two years of practical training as a trainee lawyer and plead a minimum of 25 cases. Following the completion of the training period, the applicant must obtain the recommendation of the president of the lowest court and members of the local bar association to be admitted as a lawyer.

=== Ethiopia ===
A law license requires a diploma in law from a legally recognized educational institution. Ethiopian law schools offer undergraduate (LLB) and postgraduate (Juris Doctor) degrees in law. Students must complete a college preparatory program before acceptance to an LLB program. Those with an undergraduate degree (BA or BSC) in another field may be admitted to a three-year Juris Doctor program. All undergraduate students must complete the Law School Exit Examination to graduate. After earning a law degree, graduates must pass an exam for the relevant law license. The Regions of Ethiopia and the Ethiopian federal government all issue their own licenses for the practice of law.

=== Gabon ===
Gabon requires candidates to hold a law degree and complete a one-year internship under the supervision of a lawyer who has been licensed to practice law for at least five years. After completing the internship, the candidate must then petition the president of the Bar Association for a second one-year internship. At the end of the second internship, the candidate may petition the Bar Council to be enrolled as a lawyer.

=== Ghana ===
The General Legal Council is responsible for issuing licenses to practice law. Applicants must be of good character and have satisfactorily completed a course in law which meets its requirements at a school of law or other place of instruction it recognizes, or be qualified in practicing law in a country with a sufficiently analogous legal system. They must also practice for at least six months in the chambers of a lawyer who has been working in the profession for not less than seven years. Law licenses must be renewed annually. Those admitted to practice law in Ghana become members of the Ghana Bar Association.

=== Kenya ===
Legal practice in Kenya is governed by the Advocates Act, Chapter 16 of the Laws of Kenya. Only lawyers admitted to the Bar, known as Advocates of the High Court of Kenya, have the right of audience before Kenyan courts. To be an advocate, (which is concurrent with being a member of the Law Society of Kenya) one must first complete a law degree from a recognised university in Kenya or any other Commonwealth country, then attend the Kenya School of Law for a postgraduate Diploma in Legal Practice for training in more practical legal subjects such as conveyancing and evidence, and complete a mandatory six-month articles of pupillage under a lawyer of five years' standing.

Advocates who wish to administer oaths—usually in affidavit format—must apply to the Chief Justice to be appointed Commissioners for Oaths, whereas those who wish to perform functions similar to notaries public in the United Kingdom must have been advocates for five years, and formally apply to be a notary public to the Chief Justice through the Court Registrar. To appear before the Supreme Court, one must be an advocate of seven years' standing.

=== Madagascar ===
To become an advocate (advocat), an individual must obtain a master's degree in law or equivalent degree and a Certificate of Aptitude for the Legal Profession, after which three years of further legal training, which can be extended by another two years, are required. Lawyers must re-register annually.

=== Morocco ===
To be registered as an advocate, an individual must be a Moroccan national or national of a country which has an agreement with Morocco which grants nationals of both countries reciprocal rights to practice law, be at least 21 years of age, enjoy full civil capacity, possess a bachelor's degree in law from a Moroccan law school or equivalent certificate from a recognized university, obtain a certificate of eligibility to practice law, have no convictions, never have been declared bankrupt, and not have been linked to the management of public institutions for a certain amount of time. Applicants must then pass the bar exam conducted by the Ministry of Justice and practice as a trainee lawyer for two years.

=== Namibia ===
Namibia has a detailed act that fully delineates the requisites to be a Legal Practitioner. Aspiring lawyers must hold a law degree from the University of Namibia or equivalent qualification from a university outside the country recognized by the Namibian government, obtain a certificate from the Board of Legal Education stating that the trainee lawyer has undergone practical legal training, and pass the Legal Practitioners' Qualifying Examination.

=== Niger ===
Admission to the Niger Bar requires a master's degree in law, passing the entry exam, completing a Certificate of Professional Practice and a one-year internship, or a two-year internship for those who do not have a Certificate of Professional Practice. At the end of the internship, the trainee lawyer is given a certificate of completion after their supervisor gives a reasoned opinion, and is eligible to register for the Niger Bar.

=== Nigeria ===
One has to complete a five-year LLB program in an accredited university in Nigeria or abroad, then a compulsory one-year program (bar 2) at the Nigerian Law School. International students do a preliminary course (bar 1) before doing the compulsory one-year program. During the law school program, students do compulsory court attachment and chamber attachment before graduation. After obtaining a law degree, aspiring lawyers must pass the examination at the Nigerian Law School. Those who pass are then called to the Nigerian Bar by the Nigerian Body of Benchers and enroll as a legal practitioner before the Supreme Court of Nigeria.

=== Rwanda ===
Holders of a Rwandan law license must be nationals of Rwanda, hold at least a bachelor's degree in law or equivalent degree, have a certificate from the Institute of Legal Practice and Development or an equivalent, and pass the bar exam. Applicants must also not have been sentenced to a prison term equal to or exceeding six months.

=== Sudan ===
Individuals who apply to become advocates in Sudan must possess Sudanese nationality, be at least 21 years of age and of good character, possess an LLB degree from a recognized educational institution, and pass the Legal Professing exam, which is managed by the Advocates Admissions Committee, unless granted an exemption from doing so. Successful applicants must complete a one-year traineeship, then pass an interview with the Bar Admission Committee before being admitted. Licenses must be renewed annually.

=== Tunisia ===
To practice as an advocate in Tunisia, individuals must be registered in the table of advocats. Registration requires a person to have held Tunisian nationality for at least five years, to be a resident of Tunisia, be between 20 and 50 years of age, have no criminal record, never to have been declared bankrupt, and have fulfilled all national service requirements. Candidates must hold a certificate of aptitude for the legal profession from the Higher Institute of the Legal Profession unless they hold the title of Professor of Law from a Tunisian or foreign university, in which case they may gain an exemption from this requirement. Newly qualified lawyers must spend a year as a trainee lawyer, during which time they can only plead before lower courts. After one year, they may apply to be fully certified as a lawyer.

=== Uganda ===
To be admitted as an advocate, an individual must be a Ugandan national or resident, possess a Bachelor of Laws degree from a Ugandan university or an educational institution from any other country with a common law legal system and recognized by the Law Council, and obtain a postgraduate diploma in legal practice from the Law Development Centre. Candidates must then apply to be recognized as lawyers by the Law Council, which will issue an advocate's license if satisfied that the applicant is eligible and is a fit and proper person to be an advocate. Advocate's licenses must be renewed annually.

=== Zimbabwe ===
To be admitted to practice law, one must complete an LLB degree from the University of Zimbabwe or Midlands State University, register with the Law Society of Zimbabwe and receive a practicing certificate, and be enrolled on the register of the Supreme Court of Zimbabwe. Practicing certificates from the Law Society of Zimbabwe must be renewed annually. Holders of degrees from outside Zimbabwe must have obtained them from designated institutions and take an exam.

== Americas ==
=== Anguilla ===
Admission to practice in Anguilla is regulated by the Legal Profession Act 2016. To be admitted in Anguilla a person first needs to be admitted in either England & Wales, Scotland or Northern Ireland, or have received a Certificate of Legal Education from the Council of Legal Education of the West Indies. Further the applicant needs to be either (a) a Belonger of Anguilla, (b) resident in Anguilla, or (c) a citizen of certain specified Caribbean countries.

=== Argentina ===
In Argentina, prospective lawyers must complete an undergraduate law degree (Abogado, which lasts five to six years depending on the university), and then become a member of one of the jurisdictional associations.

=== Bahamas ===
Under the laws of the Bahamas, only a Bahamian national can normally be admitted as a lawyer. However, there is an exception for special admissions to allow senior barristers who have specialist expertise to be admitted to conduct a single case.

=== Bolivia ===
Bolivia requires candidates to complete a law degree at a Bolivian law school, which takes 9-10 semesters, and then submit a graduate certificate and certificate of good civil standing to the Ministry of Justice. There is no bar exam in Bolivia.

=== Brazil ===
Brazil requires an undergraduate law degree (Bachelor in law, in Portuguese Bacharelado em Direito, which lasts five years) and the passing of the bar examination.

=== British Virgin Islands ===
A person may be admitted as a barrister or solicitor in the British Virgin Islands either by being admitted as a lawyer in the United Kingdom, or by attending one of the three regional law schools (Hugh Wooding Law School, Norman Manley Law School or Eugene Dupuch Law School). In 2015 the British Virgin Islands passed the Legal Profession Act 2015. Although the new admission rules under the Act have not yet been brought into force, once it does so graduates from regional law schools will still be eligible for admission but will have to undertake a period of one years' pupillage; and lawyers from the United Kingdom will only be eligible for admission if they have five years' post-qualification experience. The new regime will also allow senior foreign lawyers to be admitted temporarily just for a single case.

=== Canada ===
Canadian applicants to the bar must obtain admission (referred to as the "call to the bar") to one of the provincial or territorial Law Societies in the various jurisdictions of Canada. All domestically trained lawyers must have a bachelor's degree in law LLB or Juris Doctor (JD) from a law school accredited by the provincial law society or the National Committee on Accreditation before being called to the bar. Admission requirements to law school vary between those of common law jurisdictions, which comprise all but one of Canada's provinces and territories, and the province of Quebec, which is a civil law jurisdiction. For common law schools, students must have already completed an undergraduate degree before being admitted to an LLB or JD programme, although this requirement can be waived in exceptional circumstances. For civil law schools, students must generally either have graduated from a general and vocational college (CEGEP), have a two-year college degree, or have completed at least a year of undergraduate education. Once students earn a law degree, they must typically pass examinations and/or a legal training program and serve in an apprenticeship as an articled clerk with a law firm for a certain amount of time.

The exact requirements vary among the different provinces and territories. All jurisdictions require a law degree and a certain period of time articling. Some require a bar exam or multiple exams, others require a bar admissions course in place of an exam, and others require both examinations and courses. For example, the Law Society of British Columbia requires that a student complete an undergraduate degree in any discipline and before studying for an undergraduate law degree (LL.B. and/or B.C.L., three to four years) or Juris Doctor (three years). The applicant must then pass two licensing examinations, the Barrister Licensing Examination and Solicitor Licensing Examination, then article with a law firm for nine to fifteen months depending on the jurisdiction and nature of the articling process. The Law Society of Ontario likewise requires law graduates to pass a Barrister Licensing Examination and Solicitor Licensing Examination, then requires that candidates complete ten months of articles supervised by a practising lawyer, or an alternative such as an eight-month Law Practise Program. The Law Society of Alberta, Law Society of Manitoba, and Law Society of Saskatchewan do not require an examination; they instead require candidates to pass the Practice Readiness Education Program (PREP) course administered by the Canadian Centre for Professional Legal Education as well as a one-year articling period. The Bar of Quebec requires a bar exam and a 6-month articling period. The Law Society of Yukon requires students to article for a year and during that time to attend the Bar Admissions Course and take the Yukon Statutes Exam. All provinces also have character and fitness requirements.

=== Cayman Islands ===
A person may be admitted as an attorney-at-law in the Cayman Islands by one of three routes. A newly qualified person may qualify by either holding a bachelor of laws degree from the Cayman Islands Law School or an equivalent institution or a non-law degree together with the Common Professional Examination/Graduate Diploma in Law, and then completing the 9-month Professional Practise Course ("PPC"), followed by eighteen months as an articled clerk within a law firm. Under the Legal Practitioners (Students) Regulations (2012 Revision) only Caymanians or persons that hold Cayman Status or as otherwise approved by the Cayman Islands Cabinet may undertake the PPC. Lawyers who are already qualified to practice in the United Kingdom, Jamaica or another approved Commonwealth jurisdiction may be admitted under the Legal Practitioners Law (2015 Revision) provided that they are in good standing in their jurisdiction of admission and can demonstrate residence in the Cayman Islands for at least a year (usually by holding a valid work permit for that period of time). Lastly, lawyers who are admitted in another jurisdiction and who only wish to be temporarily admitted in the Cayman Islands for the purposes of appearing in a single case (usually King’s Counsel from London) may be temporarily admitted. All attorneys are required to hold a current practicing certificate to practice law, but the Cayman Islands is slightly unusual that if an Attorney ceases to hold a practicing certificate for two years they are struck off the roll.

=== Chile ===
Chile requires a law degree (Licenciado en Ciencias Jurídicas: five years, and to pass a bar exam covering all civil and procedural law studied, which usually takes one or two years more). A six-month apprenticeship is also required. Candidates are then sworn in as a lawyer in the Supreme Court.

=== Cuba ===
In Cuba, candidates must complete a law degree. Law school courses last five years and include several cycles of apprenticeships. After graduating, most students must sit the bar exam. Those with the highest grades may be admitted to practice law by writing an honors thesis rather than taking the bar exam. All graduates must also perform three years of social service.

=== Ecuador ===
Ecuador requires a law degree from a university in Ecuador recognized by the Secretary of Higher Education, Science, Technology and Innovation. Candidates must then complete a Pre-Professional Practice Program in a given public institution, totalling at least 500 hours of study. They must then register with the Lawyers' Forum of the Judicial Council. There is no bar exam in Ecuador.

=== Guatemala ===
To be admitted as a lawyer in Guatemala, it is necessary to hold a certificate of competence issued by the Supreme Court of Justice, which is available to those who are Guatemalan nationals and have obtained a law degree from a recognized university. Those practicing law must also register with the College of Attorneys and Notaries. There is no bar exam in Guatemala.

=== Mexico ===
Lawyers in Mexico are required to complete a law degree (Licenciado en Derecho, a five-year program), and obtain a practice certificate (cedula professional) from the Bureau of Professions of the Ministry of Education (Dirección General de Profesiones), which officially certifies the license by virtue of the law degree. There is no bar exam in Mexico.

=== Peru ===
Lawyers (Abogados) in Peru must be members of a local bar association, which requires an undergraduate law degree (Bachiller en Derecho, a six-year program) and a diploma (Titulo de Abogado), the latter requiring one year of apprenticeship and passing of the bar exam.

=== United States ===
In the United States, all states, territories, and the District of Columbia regulate and license the legal profession separately and maintain their own bars. While some other Common law countries maintain separate categories of lawyers in the form of barristers and solicitors, there is only one category of lawyer in the United States. The terms lawyer and attorney are used interchangeably. With varying exceptions, jurisdictions typically require that candidates complete a postgraduate law degree and pass the bar examination.

Most jurisdictions require applicants to complete a Juris Doctor degree from a law school approved by the American Bar Association (ABA). In the United States, all law degrees are postgraduate. Law schools require candidates to hold a bachelor's degree prior to commencing law studies. There are no requirements for any particular undergraduate degrees, and aspiring law students may complete a degree in any particular subject or in general studies. Formal pre-law programs exist but are not typically given special favor by law schools. A minority of states permit graduates of law schools not approved by the ABA to take their bar examination or will admit a graduate of such a school to their bar association provided that the candidate has been admitted to the bar of another state. The states of Alabama, California, Connecticut, Massachusetts, West Virginia, and Tennessee allow individuals to take the bar exam upon graduation from law schools approved by state bodies but not accredited by the ABA. Specifically in California, certain law schools "registered" with the Committee of Bar Examiners of the State Bar of California (CBE) are authorized to grant Juris Doctor degrees although they are not accredited by the ABA or CBE. Students at these schools must take and pass the First-Year Law Students' Examination (commonly referred to as the "baby bar") administered by the CBE, and may continue their studies to obtain their Juris Doctor degree upon passage of this exam.

The state of New York makes special provision for persons educated to degree-level in common law from overseas, with holders of bachelor degrees in law being qualified to take the bar exam and, upon passing, be admitted to the bar.

All jurisdictions require applicants to pass a moral character evaluation and to pass an ethics examination, which some states administer as part of their bar examinations. Most also require applicants to achieve a particular score on the Multistate Professional Responsibility Examination.

The states of Wisconsin and New Hampshire are the only jurisdictions to not unconditionally require law graduates to pass a bar exam for admission. Diploma privilege is available in Wisconsin for J.D. graduates of the state's two ABA-accredited law schools. LLM and SJD graduates of these law schools are not eligible for diploma privilege. New Hampshire's only law school has an alternative licensing program that allows a limited number of students who have completed certain curricula and a separate exam to bypass the regular bar examination. Most states and territories also allow admission on motion, in which licensed attorneys from different jurisdictions who have practiced for a certain period of time (typically three to seven years) may be admitted to practice law without taking a bar exam through a motion or application with the state supreme court, board of bar examiners, or bar association, typically accompanied by certificates of good standing from all other jurisdictions where they are admitted to practice and a background check demonstrating good moral character.

The states of California, Maine, New York, Vermont, Virginia, Washington, and West Virginia allow applicants to study under a judge or practicing attorney for an extended period of time rather than attending law school. This method is known as "reading law" or "reading the law". New York allows applicants who read law to take the bar exam, but only if they have at least one year of law school study. Maine allows students who completed two years of law school to serve an apprenticeship in lieu of completing their third year. California allows students who completed two years of college coursework, or the equivalent as demonstrated by examination, to meet the legal education requirement for the bar exam by studying law diligently in a lawyer's office or judge's chambers for not less than 864 hours over not less than four years. Hours spent as an employee of an attorney or judge are not counted as study. Very few people pursue these options.

The American legal system is unusual in that it has no formal apprenticeship or clinical training requirements prior to admission to the bar, with a few exceptions. Delaware requires that candidates for admission to the bar serve five months in a clerkship with a lawyer in the state. Vermont had a similar requirement but eliminated it in 2016. Washington requires, since 2005, that applicants must complete a minimum of four hours of approved pre-admission education. Some law schools have tried to rectify this lack of experience by requiring supervised "Public Service Requirements" of all graduates. States that encourage law students to undergo clinical training or perform public service in the form of pro bono representation may allow students to appear and practice in limited court settings under the supervision of an admitted attorney. (Note: For example, in New York's Third Appellate Department, "Any officer or agency of the state ... or any legal aid organization ... may make application to the presiding justice of this court for an order authorizing the employment or utilization of law students who have completed at least two semesters of law school and eligible law school graduates as law interns to render and perform legal services ... which the officer, agency or organization making the application is authorized to perform." Similarly, New York's state Department of Labor allows law students to practice in unemployment benefits hearings before the agency.)

== Asia ==
=== Armenia ===
Candidates must obtain a law degree and gain a minimum of two years of legal working experience, which is often fulfilled by a legal internship. After completing these requirements, they may sit for the bar exam. Those who pass may apply for membership in the bar.

=== Azerbaijan ===
In order to practice law, candidates must complete higher legal education, have at least three years of work experience in a legal field or field of law in scientific and pedagogical educational institutions, pass an examination consisting of a written test and an interview by the Lawyers Qualification Commission, and go through training at the Justice Academy run by the Ministry of Justice.

=== Bangladesh ===
Practicing law requires admission to the Bangladesh Bar Council. In order to do so, candidates must be citizens of Bangladesh, be a minimum of 21 years old, and obtain a law degree. They must pass the Bar Council Examination to be allowed to practice law.

=== Bhutan ===
In Bhutan, only Bhutanese citizens are permitted to practice law; international lawyers and firms are not allowed to practice in the country. Lawyers practicing in Bhutan, known as Jabmi in Dzongkha, must pass the Bar exam conducted by the Bar Council of Bhutan. To be admitted to the Bar, a Jabmi must fulfill several criteria: be a Bhutanese citizen, be a person of integrity, good character, and reputation, not be of unsound mind or have a mental infirmity, not be adjudged bankrupt, not have been convicted of a criminal offense and sentenced to imprisonment, have legal qualifications recognized by the Jabmi Tshogdey of Bhutan, and have passed the Bar selection examinations.

=== Cambodia ===
Cambodia requires a Bachelor of Law or equivalent law degree, certificate of Lawyer's Professional Skill from the Center for the Training of the Legal Profession, and no misdemeanor or felony record, as well as no disciplinary sanction or administrative penalty. Unless granted an exemption, prospective lawyers must then spend a year as a trainee lawyer, either in a training program conducted by the Bar Association or by working as an associate in a law firm. Following the training period, the Bar Council will make a decision whether or not to register the prospective lawyer with the Bar Association based on whether or not the trainee fulfilled the requirements and a report on the trainee's supervising lawyer. If the Bar Council decides that the trainee does not have sufficient competence, it can order a period of additional training not to exceed one year. Applicants who satisfy the Bar Council that they are of sufficient competence are registered with the Bar Association and are allowed to practice law.

=== China ===
In China, one must first obtain a recognized law degree (a bachelor's, master's, or doctoral degree) or have at least three years of work experience in certain legal institutions. Those aspiring to be allowed to practice law must also have a record of good behavior. Applicants must then pass the National Unified Legal Professional Qualification Examination. They must also complete a one-year apprenticeship before being granted a license to practice law.

=== India ===
In India, prospective lawyers must complete an undergraduate law degree after 12 years of schooling and obtain an honours law degree, (actually a double degree) where the course is a five-year course. The first undergraduate foundational and generic degree, (usually B.A.Law but in some cases Bachelor of General Laws/Bachelor of Socio-Legal Studies etc.) is awarded after three years of study, and the professional law degree called the LL.B. (honours) degree, which has a substantial component of practical training, is earned after two years of further legal studies.

Alternatively any graduate with a bachelor's degree in any subject (obtained after 15 years of education, i.e. after graduation), can enroll for a second graduate degree in law of a three-year course (LL.B. degree). The 5-year LL.B. (honours) degree and the 3-year LL.B. degree are the only qualifying professional degrees recognized for entering the legal profession in India.

Law graduates in India are not entitled to call themselves advocates and can not appear in courts even if they call themselves lawyers. India requires all law graduates, intending to enter the profession of practising law as advocates, to first enroll themselves on the Roll of Advocates of any State Bar Council (regional authorities under the overall authority of the Bar Council of India) and to pass the All India Bar Examination (AIBE) conducted by the Bar Council of Indiawhich is the institution regulating the profession of legal practice. It is mandatory for all law school graduates to qualify in the All India Bar Examination, without which they cannot be admitted to practice in courts and may not refer to themselves as advocates. After being enrolled by one of the State Bar Councils and clearing the All India Bar Examination, a law graduate's name is entered on the Roll of Advocates maintained by their State Bar Council and is issued a Certificate of Practice. After this, they are entitled to call themselves advocates and can appear in court representing clients.

All advocates in India, irrespective of which State Bar Council they are registered to, have the right to practice in all High Courts and their Subordinate Courts and Tribunals throughout India under Section 30 of the Advocates Act. However, to practise Law before the Supreme Court of India, Advocates must first appear for and qualify in the Supreme Court Advocate on Record Examination conducted by the Supreme Court.

=== Indonesia ===
There is no distinction between barrister and solicitor in Indonesia. Instead, an admitted person to the bar to practice law is called an advocate (advokat), who is licensed to provide legal services both before or outside the court.

To be an Indonesian advocate, one needs to be appointed by Peradi (Indonesian Advocates Association) and take an oath in an open proceeding before the high court having a jurisdiction over the prospective advocate. As an advocate, one is allowed to practice law all over Indonesia.

Before appointed as an advocate, there are requirements which must be met which are listed under Article 3 paragraph 1 of the Indonesian Law No. 18 of 2003 on Advocate. The prospective advocate should be an Indonesian citizen, domiciled in Indonesia, is not a civil servant nor a state official, at least 25 years old, holds a bachelor's degree in law and has completed the special education for advocates arranged by Peradi, passed the bar exam organised by Peradi, has completed an internship in a law office for a continuous period of 2 years, has never been penalised for a criminal offense which is subject to an imprisonment of 5 years or more, and well behaved, honest, could act fairly and has a high integrity.

=== Iran ===
Iran requires an undergraduate law degree (LL.B., which is a four-year program). After obtaining a law degree, the candidate must pass the bar exam. The Bar Exam in Iran is administered by two different and completely separate bodies. One is the Bar Association of every province—all of which are under the auspices of the country's syndicate of the bars of the country. The other one is administered by the Judicial System of Iran subject to Article 187 of the country's economic, social and cultural development plan. The exam is highly competitive and only a certain number of top applicants are admitted annually.

After a candidate completes a law degree and passes the bar exam, they are admitted to the bar as a "Trainee at Law". After admission to the bar, an 18-month apprenticeship begins which is highly regulated under the auspices of Bar Syndicate Rules and supervision of an assigned First Degree Attorney. Trainees or apprentices must attend designated courts for designated weeks to hear cases and write case summaries. A logbook signed by the judge on the bench has to certify their weekly attendance. By the end of the eighteenth month, they are eligible to apply to take the Final Bar Exam by submitting their case summaries, the logbook and a research work pre-approved by the Bar. It is noteworthy, however, that during these 18 months, Trainees are eligible to have a limited practice of law under the supervision of their supervising Attorney. This practice does not include Supreme Court eligible cases and certain criminal and civil cases. Candidates will be tested on Civil law, Civil Procedure, Criminal law, Criminal Procedure, Commercial Law, Notary (including rules pertaining Official Documents, Land & Real Estate registrations and regulations etc.). Each exam takes two days, a day on oral examination in front of a judge or an attorney, and a day of essay examination, in which they will be tested on hypothetical cases submitted to them. Successful applicants will be honored with the title of "First Degree Attorney", after they take the oath and can practice in all courts of the country including the Supreme Court. Those who fail must redo the program in full or in part before re-taking the Final Bar Exam.

=== Israel ===
Israel requires an undergraduate law degree from an educational institution recognized by the Law Faculty of the Hebrew University of Jerusalem. Candidates must then pass a series of examinations on eight separate areas of law. After these exams, the candidate must complete an apprenticeship in a law firm as an articled clerk for eighteen months, working at least 36 hours a week. After serving their articles, candidates must pass the final examinations on nine subjects of law and court procedure, which consist of a written examination followed by an oral examination before three judges. Those who pass are eligible for admittance to the Israel Bar Association. Residence in Israel is a precondition for admittance.

Lawyers moving to Israel from abroad without an Israeli law degree must have at least two years of practical legal experience as an attorney or judge in their country of origin. If an applicant does not have the required experience, the foreign law degree must be recognized by the Hebrew University of Jerusalem. The applicant must also complete a Hebrew proficiency exam followed by the battery of exams and internship requirements listed above. Those who have at least five years of practical legal experience abroad and began serving their articles within ten years of their arrival in Israel are exempt from the final examinations.

=== Japan ===
Japan requires the passing of the national bar exam, a 12-month training program which incorporates additional coursework and field training as apprentices to judges, prosecutors, and law offices, and passing the graduation examination of the training program. To sit for the bar exam, applicants must have the degree of juris doctor or have passed the preliminary bar exam. The training program is conducted by the Legal Research and Training Institute of the Supreme Court of Japan. During the program, future prosecutors and judges are handpicked and trained for the role.

In Japan, an attorney (Japanese: 弁護士) must be a member of one of the local bar associations which are organised into national bar association (Japanese: 日本弁護士連合会).

=== Kazakhstan ===
Lawyers in Kazakhstan must complete an undergraduate law degree. The legal education system includes both law courses in secondary schools (colleges) and higher education institutions (universities, academies, institutes). After completing a degree, aspiring lawyers must then pass a special qualifying examination to enter the profession.

=== Lebanon ===
Applicants must be Lebanese citizens for at least ten years and between the ages of 20 and 65. They should possess full civil capacity and a four-year Lebanese Bachelor of Laws from recognized universities, alongside the Lebanese Baccalaureate Part II. High ethical standards are mandatory, including having a clean judicial record, demonstrating behavior that inspires trust and respect, and not being dismissed from public service or a profession for dishonorable reasons.

The journey begins with an entrance examination for one of the country’s two Bar Associations, followed by a comprehensive three-year internship under a registered practicing attorney-at-law. Candidates then undergo rigorous exit oral and written examinations, testing their legal knowledge and language proficiency, particularly in Arabic, and either French or English. The Bar Council meticulously scrutinizes the applications, extending the review period if necessary, to validate the candidates’ reputation and eligibility. Upon successful completion of these stages, and after taking the official oath and settling any associated fees, the individual can practice law in Lebanon, provided they maintain the stringent criteria set forth by the legal profession’s regulatory framework.

=== Malaysia ===
Malaysia requires advocates and solicitors to be admitted to the Malaysian Bar. The prerequisite is either a Bachelor of Laws (Hons) degree (an LL.B (Hons)., which requires four years of study) from the local law faculties or a call as a Barrister in the UK or a Certificate in Legal Practice, which is a post-graduate qualification on procedural law equivalent to a master's degree and taking approximately nine months to complete, and a nine-month pupillage. Advocates and Solicitors are entitled to appear before the courts and/or perform solicitors' work, as the legal profession in Malaysia is fused without any distinction between barristers and solicitors.

The East Malaysian states of Sabah and Sarawak have their own sets of criteria for admission to their own respective law societies.

=== Mongolia ===
All lawyers must be members of the Mongolian Bar Association (MBA). Prospective lawyers must graduate from a law school accredited by the MBA and undertake a two-year period of professional training, after which they become eligible to take the bar examination. Candidates who pass the bar examination must send a request for membership to the MBA together with the required documents. Upon examination and validation of the documents, the applicant is registered as a member and granted a license to practice law.

=== Nepal ===
Nepal requires lawyers to complete a bachelor's degree in law and then pass an exam conducted by the Nepal Bar Council to obtain a legal practitioner's license.

=== Philippines ===
To practice law in the Philippines, one must have fulfilled the non-academic and academic requirements. For non-academic requirements, one must be a Filipino, be at least 21 years old, be a resident of the Philippines, and have the moral and other non-academic qualifications needed. In terms of academic requirements, one must have obtained an undergraduate degree (with major, focus or concentration in any of the subjects of history, economics, political science, logic, English or Spanish), has obtained a Juris Doctor degree (or Bachelor of Laws before 2019) from a law schoolrecognized by the Secretary of Education. They must have also taken and passed (75% general average, with no subject falling below 50%) the Bar Exam, taken the Attorney's Oath before the Supreme Court, signed the Roll of Attorneys, remain in good standing with the Integrated Bar of the Philippines, and continually participate in Mandatory Continuing Legal Education.

=== Saudi Arabia ===
The practice of law requires an applicant to hold a degree from a Sharia college, Bachelor of Law degree from a Saudi university, an equivalent of any of these degrees from abroad, or a postgraduate diploma in legal studies from the Saudi Institute of Public Administration. Three years of practical legal work experience are then required unless the applicant holds a master's degree in Sharia or law or is a graduate of a Sharia college with a postgraduate degree in law, in which case only one year of legal work experience is required. Those holding a doctorate in either of these fields are exempt from the work experience requirement entirely. Those who practice law must also be of good conduct and not have been subject to a Hudud or any other punishment which impugns integrity for the past five years, and must be residents of Saudi Arabia. To be allowed to practice law, applicants must fulfill the educational and work requirements, then sign a declaration confirming that they were not subjected to a Hudud or any other criminal penalty impugning their integrity within the past five years and are residents of the country.

=== Singapore ===
Persons seeking admission to the Singapore Bar must obtain an approved law degree through completing a course of study of at least three academic years leading to that degree as a full-time internal candidate from an approved university. The degree is typically an LL.B. or an LL.B. (honours), depending on the university, or a J.D. (from a Singaporean university or one of only four approved US universities). They are then required to sit for the Singapore Bar Examinations, which is divided into Part A (for overseas graduates from approved overseas universities only) and Part B (a five-month practical course, compulsory for both local and overseas graduates). They are further required to complete a one-year (six-month prior to 2024) Practice Training Contract before they can be called to the Bar as Advocates and Solicitors of the Supreme Court of Singapore. Advocates and Solicitors are entitled to appear before courts or perform solicitors' work, as the legal profession in Singapore is fused without any distinction between barristers and solicitors.

Exemptions from any of these requirements may be obtained from the Ministry of Law.

=== South Korea ===
In South Korea, one can be admitted to practice law by passing the exam called 변호사시험 (officially translated as "Bar Examination") which requires prior completion of three-year law school course with the degree of Juris Doctor. This law school system is similar to system of United States. However, before year 2018, there was a nation-wide system to train lawyers for 2 years, including judge, prosecutor and attorney at law. This old training institution was called as 사법연수원 (officially translated as "Judicial Research and Training Institute", JRTI)', which is now acting mainly as institution to train junior judges and court officials in South Korea. Entering JRTI required passing a special exam on jurisprudence. Its name was 사법시험 (officially translated as "Judicial Examination") which required taking a little part of course in LL.B. or any other equivalent degree.

=== Sri Lanka ===
Sri Lanka requires an attorney to be admitted and enrolled as an Attorney-at-Law of the Supreme Court of Sri Lanka to practice law. In order to become an attorney, candidates must graduate from the Sri Lanka Law College, which typically takes three years and involves three examinations. For those who possess a law degree from a foreign university recognized by the Council of Legal Education, the entrance exam may be waived. Candidates who have a bachelor's degree in law from the University of Colombo, Open University of Sri Lanka, University of Jaffna, and University of Peradeniya are exempt from all lectures and only need to take the final examination. Those qualified as a barrister in England and Wales, Scotland, and Ireland are exempt from most lectures. After graduation, candidates must then go through a practical training course and a six-month apprenticeship under an attorney of at least eight years before applying for membership in the Bar Association of Sri Lanka.

=== Taiwan ===
Taiwan requires an undergraduate law degree, which takes four years. Afterwards, students must pass the Attorney Qualification Examination. Graduates must then complete a six-month internship with certified institutions before receiving a license to practice law from the Ministry of Justice. Attorneys must join a bar association before being allowed to practice law.

=== Thailand ===
Under the Thailand Lawyers Act B.E. 2528 (1985), litigators (barristers) who practice before the courts in Thailand must obtain a "Lawyer's License" issued by the Lawyers Council of Thailand. Legal counsels (solicitors) who do not practice before the courts are not regulated and therefore are not subject to regulatory oversight of the Lawyers Council of Thailand. Law graduates who perform corporate and commercial legal services either in law firms or in-house are not required to obtain a Lawyer's License nor are they required to register with any regulatory body.

To obtain a Lawyer's License, with the right to appear in court, an individual must have the following qualifications: (i) be a Thai national; (ii) be at least 20 years of age; (iii) be a graduate with either a bachelor's degree or an associate degree in Law or an equivalent Certificate in Law from an educational institution accredited by the Lawyers' Council of Thailand; (iv) not be a person of indecent behavior or delinquent morals or a person whose conduct is indicative of dishonesty; (v) not have been imprisoned by a final judgment; (vi) not have been bankrupt by a final judgment; (vii) not having an ailment which is contagious and repugnant to the public; (viii) not being physically disabled or mentally infirmed which may cause professional incompetence; (ix) not be a government official or a local government official with permanent salary and position; (x) take a training course offered by the Lawyers Council of Thailand (normally one month of theoretical training and at least six months of practical training); (xi) pass the Thai Law Society examinations (Sapa Tanai Kwam); (xii) enroll with the Thai Bar Association (Regulation of Lawyers Council on Lawyer's Training B.E. 2529 (AD 1986)). Candidates who have been an apprentice in a law firm for over a year and have passed an examination specified by the Board of Governors of the Lawyers Council of Thailand may be exempted from the period of practical training. The lawyer's licence is valid for two years but can be valid for lifetime for a fee (s.39 of the Thailand Lawyers Act). Lawyers who wish to obtain the title barrister-at-law which entitle the holder to take further examinations to become a judge or a public prosecutor, may take a further one- year course offered by the Thai Bar Association

=== United Arab Emirates ===
A local lawyer must be registered on the Roll of Practicing Advocates, which requires the candidate to be a UAE national, at least 21 years old, have full civil capacity, have good character and reputation, not have been subjected to criminal or disciplinary actions arising from a breach of honor or trust, have a degree in law or Islamic law from an accredited educational institution, and have carried out at least one year of continuous practical legal training. UAE lawyers are qualified to practice throughout the country but each Emirate may make it a condition that a lawyer must have an office there in order to practice law. Every Emirate maintains further requirements for local lawyers. Individual foreign nationals wishing to practice law may gain an exception to the nationality requirement if they fulfill the age, civil capacity, and character requirements, have fifteen years of experience working in the legal field, must be a resident of the UAE, and must practice through a bureau of a national lawyer registered on the Roll of Practicing Advocates. Foreign law firms may carry out legal activities in the UAE subject to the regulatory requirements of the individual Emirate where they are present.

=== Vietnam ===
Prospective lawyers must complete a Bachelor of Law degree. Vietnamese law schools typically offer 4-year law programs. After obtaining their bachelor's degree, they must complete one year of professional legal training at the Judicial Academy under the Ministry of Justice and pass an exam. After obtaining a certificate from the Judicial Academy, law graduates must undergo a one-year traineeship with a law firm or law office, and must register the traineeship with the bar association of the locality where the law firm or law office is located. After completing the traineeship, the trainee must pass a bar examination conducted by the Vietnam Bar Federation. Upon passing the bar examination, the trainee lawyer must file for an application for a certificate of legal practice from the Ministry of Justice. Upon being granted a certificate, registration to a local bar association is required. The bar association which the trainee joins will then request that the Vietnam Bar Federation issue a lawyer card, which fully qualifies the trainee to practice law.

== Europe ==
=== Albania ===
Albanian advocates should be members of the Albanian Bar Association (Albanian: Dhoma e Avokatise e Shqipërisë). To be admitted to the bar, a candidate must complete a law degree, complete an internship with a practicing advocate lasting a minimum of one year and receive a positive evaluation, complete the initial training program at the School of Advocacy, and pass the Advocate's Qualifying Exam.

=== Belarus ===
In Belarus, an advocate (barrister) must be a member of one of a local bar associations which are organised into a National Bar Association (Belarusian: Беларуская рэспубліканская калегія адвакатаў). In order to be admitted to the bar, candidates must have a university degree in law. Law students in Belarus must specialize in one of the following fields to be eligible to practice law: jurisprudence, international law, state security, customs service, economic law, and state management in law. They must also undertake additional training in one of two ways. One of them is to obtain three years of professional legal experience by employment in a court or under other organizations and persons responsible for public order. The other is to undertake six months to a year of apprenticeship in a legal office. They must then pass an exam.

=== Belgium ===
In Belgium, a prospective lawyer ("advocaat" in Dutch, "avocat"/"avocat" in French) must meet following requirements:

- hold a master's degree in law (which requires two years of study and the Bachelor in Law which requires three years of study) or hold a PhD in Law
- taking the pledge in a court of appeal,
- a three-year apprenticeship (Flemish prospective lawyers have to do 15 cases of pro bono during these 3 years),
- the CAPA (French, 'Certificat d'aptitude à la profession d'avocat') course of study,
- pass the final bar exam.

During the three-year apprenticeship the prospective lawyer is equivalent to a licensed lawyer, and can for instance issue legal opinions and directly represent clients before all courts (except for the Supreme Court).

=== Croatia ===
All attorneys in Croatia have to be members of the Croatian Bar Association (Croatian: Hrvatska odvjetnička komora) as well as members of local bar associations (mandatory membership). The membership requires completion of the one-cycle five-year master's degree, the Bar Examination in the Republic of Croatia (which can be accessed after at least 18 months of apprenticeship), and at least three years of experience in a law office or in judicial bodies (or five years of experience on legal jobs outside judiciary), the time before Bar Examination included.

=== Czech Republic ===
A person must meet the following conditions in order to be admitted to practice law in the Czech Republic:

- full capacity
- Master's degree in law acquired at a Czech law school or analogous education acquired at a foreign university, if such an education is officially acknowledged as equivalent by an international treaty, by which the Czech Republic is bound, or if a particular enactment acknowledges such a foreign education, or if it is acknowledged due to its content and extent from the point of view of knowledge and skill as sufficient for practicing law by the Advocacy Enactment
- at least three years of legal apprenticeship
- personal integrity (absence of conviction for deliberate crime)
- absence of disciplinary punishment of prohibition of law practice (if a person was already a law practitioner)
- absence of being stricken from the list of law practitioners because of personal bankruptcy
- absence of labour engagement or officiary engagement, except of engagement:
  - to the Bar Association or to similar organisation in other EU state
  - to a law practitioner or to a legal personality established in order to provide legal services
  - to a university as a lecturer
  - as a scientific worker of Academy of Sciences of the Czech Republic
- passing the bar exam
- taking the pledge

Czech advocates should be members of the Czech bar association (Czech: Česká advokátní komora).

=== Denmark ===
In Denmark, to use the title of advokat one must complete an LL.B. (three years of study) and an LL.M. (which awards the academic title of Candidata Juris, and requires two years of study), followed by a three-year apprenticeship, one year as an assistant lawyer, and an exam which has a moot court element.

Danish advocates should be members of the Danish bar association (Danish: Advokatsamfundet).

=== Estonia ===
In Estonia, anyone may call themselves a lawyer and practice law. However, the title of advocate is restricted by law to members of the Estonian Bar Association (Estonian: Eesti Advokatuur). To join the Estonian Bar Association, candidates must obtain a master's degree in law and pass the bar examination.

=== Finland ===
Until 2013, anyone could, in principle, practice law in Finland, as opposed to only qualified lawyers. However, after the entry into force of the Licensed Legal Counsel Act (715/2011) on January 1, 2013, only attorneys that are members of the bar association (Finnish: Suomen Asianajajaliitto) and who may use the title asianajaja, or licensed legal counsel may represent clients in court.

To become a licensed legal counsel requires the completion of a legal education consisting of a Bachelor of Laws degree (or oikeusnotaari, which usually takes three years to complete) and a Master of Laws degree (or oikeustieteen maisteri), which usually takes one to two years to complete, and a traineeship of a minimum of one year in either Courts or in law firms.

After the traineeship is completed successfully, the district court awards the title of varatuomari (VT) or those who do not do a traineeship in Court can apply to be licensed legal counsel, which is in practice the basic qualification to practice law. To be admitted to the Finnish bar association, the same legal education requirement as for licensed legal counsel applies, but the traineeship requirement is four years and one has to pass a bar exam (Asianajotutkinto, "Advocates Exam") which also requires the demonstration of practical skills. In-house counsel are not allowed to be members of the bar, but can be licensed legal counsel. Also foreign attorneys can practice in Finland as in-house counsel, without being licensed in Finland, but are not allowed to represent clients in Courts

Graduates holding a foreign LLB degree may be able to convert to Finnish law by taking additional undergraduate (oikeusnotaari) modules worth 50+ credits while pursuing their LLM studies at a Finnish university.

=== France ===
To become a French lawyer, an "avocat" (male) or "avocate" (female), one must:

- obtain an undergraduate degree (three years for a "licence") and complete a first year of Master of Laws (diplôme de maîtrise en droit), so a total of 4 years of study at university
- take the exam to enter one of the CRFPA (Centres Régional de Formation à la Profession d'Avocat) where one completes an eighteen-month course and obtains an award of the requisite Certificat d'aptitude à la profession d'avocat (CAPA).

However, those with degrees from another country may become a licensed attorney with a French bar by passing an exam. Depending on one's qualifications, a non-French attorney can take the Article 97, 98, 99, or 100 exam. Each of these exams has different requirements.

French advocates should be members of one of a local bar associations which are organised into national bar association (French: Conseil national des barreaux).

French "juristes" (in-house counsels) do not need to hold the Certificat d'aptitude à la profession d'avocat (CAPA).

=== Georgia ===
Practicing law in Georgia as a lawyer (solicitor) does not require a license. To be qualified to offer legal support, advice, and services to clients, one must obtain an undergraduate degree in law (four years of study) and a postgraduate diploma in law, which is awarded by the state examination commission and requires one year of study (the state examination authority confers the qualification of a lawyer). However, only the members of the Georgian Bar Association (ადვოკატები) are permitted to appear in court. Admission to the Georgian Bar Association requires completing higher legal education, passing the Bar Qualification Examination, Judicial Qualification Examination, or Prosecutor's Qualification Examination, and passing the one-year Professional Adaptation Program which consists of a 3-month theoretical course and a 9-month internship.

=== Germany ===
In Germany, a lawyer (Rechtsanwalt) must be a member of one of a local bar associations which are organised into national bar association (German: Bundesrechtsanwaltskammer). Membership in the local bar association requires the candidate to have passed two state examinations, or staatsexamen, in law.

At present, qualifying law studies do not carry a Bachelor or Master award but are instead concluded by state examinations (in contrast to university examinations). The rationale lies in the national interest of upholding the quality and comparability of legal training.

The First State Exam (Erstes Staatsexamen or Erste juristische Prüfung) is usually taken after four-and-a-half years of undergraduate law study. A university degree (Dipl.-jur. or Magister Jur.) may be granted by the university after completion of the exam, but this depends on the individual university's practice. Some prominent universities like the Law School of the University of Heidelberg do not grant a university degree after completion of the exam.

The First State Exam is followed by a two-year practical phase (Referendariat) sponsored by the local Court of Appeal (Oberlandesgericht). This is characterised by part-time studies alongside full-time work and includes work placements at various institutions, including courts of law, criminal prosecution services, in-house legal teams in the public sector and private practice law firms. Upon completion of this two-year training period, a trainee is automatically registered for the Second State Exam (Zweites Staatsexamen or Assessorprüfung).

Foreign law degrees do not generally enable the holder to enter the vocational stage of legal training in Germany. Holders of a foreign law degree must pass a Section 112a equivalent means assessment (Gleichwertigkeitsprüfung nach § 112a DRiG) before they can be admitted to a German legal traineeship.

After successful completion of the second state exam, admission to the bar is completed, and the individual may apply to be licensed to practice as a lawyer or be employed by the state as a judge or state prosecutor.

=== Greece ===
Greece requires that a lawyer (δικηγόρος) be a member of one of a local bar associations which are organised into national bar association (Greek: Ολομέλεια Δικηγορικών Συλλόγων Ελλάδας). Requirements include an undergraduate law degree, which lasts at least four years, an eighteen-month apprenticeship, and the passing of the bar examination. Candidates should normally be under thirty-five years of age.

=== Hungary ===
The Hungarian Bar Association (Hungarian: Magyar Ügyvedi Kamara) is a public body and the national organization of attorneys, which has an independent administrative apparatus and budget.

The regional bar associations are the members of the Hungarian Bar Association. The process is similar in scope to that of the German system, in that there is a dual-bar exam and practicum process. After a first degree in law, which is usually approximately 5 years, a student must pass the first level exam. Then, the apprentice must clerk or practice within a law practice for three years. Of which, one year may be substituted with further Ph.D. studies. However, they apprentice must then pass a series of 4 oral and written exams within certain subject to officially be admitted to their districts bar and practice law.

=== Ireland ===
Following the English tradition, Ireland has both barristers and solicitors. To become a solicitor, one must complete an undergraduate degree or pass the Preliminary Examination. One must then pass the Final Examination, complete a two-year apprenticeship, and finish the concurrent Professional Practice Courses. To become a barrister, one must complete an undergraduate law degree (BCL, which lasts three years or LL.B. which last four years) or the Kings Inns Diploma in Legal Studies which lasts two years, obtain the Degree of Barrister-at-Law from the Honorable Society of King's Inns(Irish: Óstaí an Rí), and finish a one-year pupillage (known as devilling).

=== Italy ===
Italy mandates membership in an Italian bar association, which requires completion of an undergraduate law degree (Laurea in Scienze Giuridiche, three years) along with a graduate law degree (Laurea Specialistica in Giurisprudenza (a two-year program which confers the title of Dottore Magistrale in Giurisprudenza), or simply the one-cycle five-year master's degree (Laurea a ciclo unico Magistrale in Giurisprudenza)), an 18-month apprenticeship, and passing of the professional exam.

There is a National Bar Association (Italian: Consiglio Nazionale Forense) representing the profession of avvocato at the national level in Italy. However, the structure of the Italian profession is decentralised, with the local bar associations (Consigli dell'Ordine degli Avvocati) holding most of the regulatory powers. The Consiglio Nazionale Forense deals with disciplinary policy for the profession; it is responsible for the Code of Conduct and will hear appeals from disciplinary decisions of the local bar associations.

=== Kosovo ===
Kosovar law distinguishes between "domestic lawyers," who must be citizens of Kosovo, and "foreign lawyers," who have an active license in a recognized jurisdiction and are admitted to practice in Kosovo under certain conditions.

=== Latvia ===
In Latvia, anyone may call themselves a lawyer (jurist) and practice law, even without a law degree. However, advocate is a protected title and only members of the Latvian Bar Association (Latvian: Latvijas Zvērināto advokātu kolēģijā) may call themselves advocates and own an advocate's office. To be admitted into the Latvian Bar Association, one must obtain a master's degree in law and pass the bar examination.

=== Liechtenstein ===
Admission to practice as a lawyer in Liechtenstein is governed by the Rechtsanwaltsgesetz (RAG). The Liechtenstein Bar Association (German: Liechtensteinische Rechtsanwaltskammer) is responsible for all bar admissions, as of January 1, 2014. One is eligible to become a licensed lawyer (Rechtsanwalt) upon completion of a Master, Licentiate(Lizenziat), or Magister of Law degree at an Austrian or Swiss university, according to Art. 5 RAG.

=== Lithuania ===
Lithuanian advocates must be members of the Lithuanian Bar Association (Lithuanian: Lietuvos advokatūra). Admittance to the Lithuanian Bar Association requires a law degree followed by at least five years of work experience in the legal field, including two years as an advocate's assistant. Candidates must pass the qualification exam for lawyers and the bar exam. A person who has ten years of experience working as a judge or ten years of experience working as a prosecutor outside Lithuania or holds a doctoral degree in law is exempt from the qualification exam and only needs to pass the bar exam.

=== Luxembourg ===
Lawyers must register with a bar association in Luxembourg (Luxembourgish: Barreau vu Lëtzebuerg). Admission to a bar association has character, language, citizenship requirements. Applicants must also complete an apprenticeship or aptitude test, depending on the list to which one wants to register.

=== Moldova ===
Moldova requires an undergraduate law degree and passage of the state examination.

=== Monaco ===
In Monaco, advocates should be members of the local bar association (French: Ordre des Avocats de Monaco). The bar association is composed of three types of lawyers: junior lawyers, who may plead before any court except the Supreme Court and Court of Review but may not represent parties, lawyers, who may plead before any court and represent parties before criminal courts, the Magistrate's Court, the Employment Tribunal, and cases provided for by law, and avocat-défenseurs, who may plead before any court and represent parties. In order to join the bar association, one must have a master's degree in law from a French university or an equivalent qualification, and pass an examination. The Secretary of Justice may then appoint the candidate as a junior lawyer. Junior lawyers must subsequently complete a three-year training period in which they regularly attend hearings in various courts, attend conferences and training sessions in the courts, defend cases assigned to them by the legal aid system or court appointment, and work in the law practice of an avocat-défenseur. Junior lawyers who successfully complete the three-year training period may be appointed lawyers by the Secretary of Justice. After five years of successful practice, a lawyer may apply to be appointed as an avocat-défenseur. The appointment is made by Sovereign Ordinance.

=== Netherlands ===
In the Netherlands, to be a licensed lawyer (Advocaat), one must complete an undergraduate law degree (Bacheloropleiding or LL.B., which is three years of study), the master of law degree (doctorandus in law before implementation of the Bologna Process and conferring the meester title, which is a one-year LL.M. program), and a three-year apprenticeship.

Only holders of a law degree with civiel effect (i.e. a qualifying law degree) are admitted to regulated legal professions (juridische togaberoepen). Qualifying law degrees in the Netherlands must cover the four foundations of legal knowledge: Dutch private law, Dutch criminal law, Dutch administrative and constitutional law and international/European law.

=== Poland ===
In Poland, a lawyer (adwokat or radca prawny) must complete a magister's degree in law (which lasts five years) and be admitted to the Polish Bar Council (Polish: Naczelna Rada Adwokacka). There are several ways to gain admission to the bar, including: three years of training followed by the bar exam; five years of legal professional experience followed by the bar exam; a Ph.D. in law followed by either the bar exam or 3 years of legal professional experience; or possession of high academic qualifications in legal sciences (e.g., habilitated doctor or professor). Once admitted to the bar association of one occupation, a lawyer can move to another occupation with little hassle.

=== Portugal ===
In order to register as a lawyer (advogado) in Portugal with the Bar Association (Portuguese: Ordem dos Advogados Portugueses), one must have a law degree, complete an 18-month legal traineeship, and pass the bar exam.

=== Romania ===
The Romanian National Union of Bar Associations (Romanian: Uniunea Națională a Barourilor din România) regulates the profession of a lawyer (avocat) in Romania. A graduate of a Romanian law school with a bachelor's degree must pass the bar exam to obtain the status of a probationary lawyer. After practicing law under the supervision of another lawyer for two years as a trainee lawyer, one can pass the permanent lawyer's bar exam to obtain full access to the profession. Law No. 51/1995 provides paths for lawyers already educated or admitted in another EU member state to work as lawyers in Romania.

=== Russia ===
It is not necessary to have a license to practice law in Russia as a legal consultant, but only the members of the advocate's chambers (Russian bar associations) are permitted to appear in court on criminal matters (other persons can be a defence counsel in criminal proceeding along with an advocate but not in lieu of him) and to practice before the Constitutional Court (leaving aside persons having an academic degree of candidate or doctor in juridical sciences who may can represent parties in constitutional proceeding).

To become an advocate a person should pass special qualification exam. To sit for the exam, one must have a higher legal education and also two years of experience in legal work after graduation or a training program in a law firm after graduation. The Specialist degree in law is the most commonly awarded academic degree in Russian jurisprudence, but after Russia's accession to the Bologna process only bachelor of laws and master of laws academic degreesare available in Russian institutions of higher education.

An examination is administered by the qualifications commission of an advocate's chamber. The exam is both written and oral, but the main test is oral. The written exam takes place in the form of computer testing and includes issues of the professional conduct of advocate and advocate's professional responsibility. After successfully passing of the written exam the candidates are allowed to take the oral exam. As part of the oral exam, the candidate must demonstrate his knowledge in various bodies of law and solve some mimic a real-life legal tasks. The candidate who does not pass the qualification exam can try to pass it again after 1 year only. The qualifications commission is composed of seven advocates, two judges, two representatives of the regional legislature, and two representatives of the Ministry of Justice.

After successful passing the qualification exam a candidate should take the oath of advocate. From the moment of taking the oath, he becomes an advocate and a member of the advocate's chamber of the relevant federal subject of Russia. Advocate's chamber sends relevant information to the territorial subdivision of the Ministry of Justice of the Russian Federation, which includes the new advocate in the register of advocates of the relevant federal subject of Russia and issues to him an advocate's certificate, which is the only official document confirming the status of an advocate, on the basis of this information. The status of an advocate is granted for an indefinite period and is not limited by any age. There is only 1 advocate's chamber in each federal subject of Russia. Each advocate can be the member of only 1 advocate's chamber and can be listed in the register of advocates of the relevant federal subject of Russia only. In case of relocation to another region, the advocate ceases to be a member of the advocate's chamber and should be excluded from register of advocates at the old place of residence (advocate's certificate should be returned to the subdivision of the Ministry of Justice of the Russian Federation, which issued it), and after that he becomes a member of the advocate's chamber and is included in the register of advocates at the new place of residence (where he receive new advocate's certificate) without any exams. Each advocate can carry out his professional activity throughout Russia, regardless of membership in particular regional advocate's chamber and regardless of particular regional register where he is listed in. Advocates carry out their professional activity individually (advocate's cabinet) or as the member of advocate's juridical person (collegium of advocates, advocate's bureau). Advocate can open own cabinet after at least 3 years legal practice in collegium or bureau. An advocate, who has opened own cabinet, can not be the member of any advocate's juridical person, and an advocate, who is the member of one advocate's juridical person, can not be the member of any other advocate's juridical person. Advocate is obliged to report to advocate's chamber any changes in his membership in a collegium or a bureau and, equally, opening and closing a cabinet.

Advocate's chambers are professional associations of advocates, which are based on mandatory membership of advocates. All regional advocate's chambers are mandatory members of Federal Chamber of Advocates of Russian Federation(Russian: Федеральная палата адвокатов Российской Федерации), which is professional association at the federal level.

In Russia, foreign Advocates can advise on the legislation of their countries; they should register in the special register maintained by the Ministry of Justice of the Russian Federation to obtain the right to carry out this activity. Foreign advocate can in addition become Russian advocate. There are two possible paths for that. The first possibility is to become Russian advocate on the same basis as Russian citizens (i.e. through higher legal education in one of Russian universities, two years of experience in legal work in Russia after graduation or a training program in Russian law firm after graduation, successful passing the qualification exam). Since Russia's WTO Accession the second possibility is available: foreign advocate can just pass special qualification exam to become Russian advocate.

=== San Marino ===
Upon possession of a four-year bachelor's degree in law from a recognized foreign university, one must pass an examination for membership into the bar association (Ordine degli avvocati e notai). Furthermore, one must possess all civil rights, reside in San Marino, and be a citizen of San Marino or an eligible country.

=== Serbia ===
Article 6 of the "Law about Lawyers" ("Zakon o advokaturi") establishes the requirements to become a lawyer in Serbia. A prospective lawyer must have a law degree from a Serbian or recognized foreign university. Then, the lawyer must practice law at least 2 years within a law firm, and pass the Serbian bar exam. Health and character requirements apply. One must also be a citizen of Serbia. However, according to Article 14 of the law, a foreign citizen admitted to practice law in his home country can also be entered on the registry of lawyers.

=== Slovakia ===
In Slovakia, one must first possess a master's degree in law or a foreign equivalent to become a lawyer. A training period between three and five years is also necessary. In addition to fulfilling character requirements and passing the bar exam, the applicant must take an oath. Upon fulfilling the aforementioned criteria, the applicant will be admitted to practice law by the Slovak Bar Association (Slovak: Slovenská advokátska komora). Some of these requirements can be waived for a person who is a university professor in law, has passed other Slovak legal examinations, or is admitted as a lawyer in another EU country.

=== Slovenia ===
To practice law, one must be admitted to the Slovenian Bar Association (Slovene: Odvetniška Zbornica Slovenije), which regulates the legal profession in Slovenia. To be admitted, one must complete a master's degree in law, pass the state legal exam, and have four years of work experience in the legal field.

=== Spain ===
In Spain, in order for lawyers to practice law they must be in possession of the Lawyer's Professional Title (lawyer's license) and they must be joined to a bar association of Spain (any of the 83 bar associations of Spain). In Spain it is compulsory (legally mandatory) to be joined to a bar association (it could be any of all Spain). In total there are 6 years of training in order to practice law.

In order to practice law (and to get the lawyer's license), the following requirements are necessary (legally mandatory): a bachelor's degree in Law (4 years), a master's degree in Law and Legal Practice (2 years), a legal internship (6 months, within those two years) and passing the All Spain Bar Examination (convened annually by the Government of Spain). Once the bar examination has been passed, the Minister of Justice issues the Lawyer's Professional Title (lawyer's license). Finally, with the lawyer's title, you can join any bar association and practice law.

In Spain, in total there are 6 years of training in order to practice law. The current system was created by the Law 34/2006 and the Royal Decree 775/2011, of 3 June. The first time the All Spain Bar Examination was convened (the new system) was in 2014 by virtue of the Royal Decree 150/2014, of March 7.

=== Sweden ===
In Sweden, there is no monopoly on the practice of law. Anyone may call themselves a lawyer (jurist), open a legal office, and practice law regardless of training or experience. Litigants are not required to employ qualified counsel, and anyone may appear before any court representing themselves or another person. However, the title of advokat is reserved by law for members of the Swedish Bar Association (Swedish: Sveriges advokatsamfund), and in practice advokats act as defense counsel in the vast majority of criminal cases. The title in effect serves as a quality label for those offering legal services. Membership in the bar association requires an LL.M. degree (juristexamen, which lasts four and a half years); three years of legal work which must be in a law office (either an established firm or one's own firm), and the passing of an oral examination.

=== Switzerland ===
In Switzerland, lawyers must complete a Bachelor of Law (BLaw, which lasts 3 years), a Master of Law (MLaw, which lasts three terms), a one- to two-year traineeship (depending on the Canton), and pass the bar examination.

=== Turkey ===
In Turkey, lawyers (avukat in Turkish) must have a bachelor's degree in law from a Turkish university or fulfill the exams required by the Council of Higher Education if they graduated from a foreign university, pass the Exam for Entrance to the Legal Professions (Hukuk Mesleklerine Giriş Sınavı), register to a local bar and the Turkish Bars Association, and complete one year of internship. Foreign citizens may have a degree from a Turkish faculty of law but only Turkish citizens may practice law in Turkey.

=== Ukraine ===
The Ukrainian National Bar Association (Ukrainian: Національна асоціація адвокатів України) regulates the legal profession in Ukraine. In order to be admitted to the bar with the title of advokat (адвокат), one must have a law degree, two years of legal experience, completed legal traineeship, and passed the bar exam. Knowledge of the Ukrainian language is obligatory.

A foreign-qualified lawyer may be listed on the United Register of Advocates of Ukraine, and hence practice law in Ukraine, if he or she applies through a regional bar association.

=== United Kingdom ===
The United Kingdom comprises three distinct legal jurisdictions:

- English law in England and Wales
- Northern Ireland law in Northern Ireland
- Scots law in Scotland

As such, admission to practice law requires different qualifications in each country of the UK.

==== England and Wales ====
In England and Wales, different qualifications are required to become a solicitor or a barrister, both of whom are lawyers, with different rights of audience in the courts. Most lawyers are solicitors, dealing directly with clients, while barristers are specialist advocates, instructed by solicitors. For both professions, one must either obtain an undergraduate law degree (LL.B., which typically lasts three years), or an undergraduate degree in another field and then complete the Common Professional Examination/Postgraduate Diploma in Law, which lasts one year. Future barristers must also pass Bar Course Aptitude Test (BCAT) and complete the Bar Professional Training Course (formerly Bar Vocational Course), followed by a year of vocational training known as a pupillage and be a member of one of the four prestigious Inns of Court.

Potential solicitors are required to complete the Legal Practice Course, which lasts one year, then a two-year apprenticeship under a training contract, during which the trainee solicitor has to complete a Professional Skills Course.

Chartered Legal Executives (formerly known as Fellows of CILEx) are the third type of lawyer in the UK and undertake a series of training courses and are required to pass a series of exam and coursework units to gain qualification. The first stage for the full vocational route to qualifying is called the CILEx Level 3 Professional Diploma in Law and Practice and is set at the equivalent to A-level law. The second qualifications are equivalent to an honours degree course - the CILEx Level 6 Diploma in Law and Practice. Thirdly, once all exams are complete, trainees must complete a portfolio similar to that of solicitor trainees over the course of 12 months.

Trainees will often work at the same time as studying in order to acquire practical skills. The courses can be undertaken at a college, university or through an open learning programme. The courses are open to graduates and non-graduates. Chartered Legal Executives qualify after completing their CILEX training as well as a minimum of three years' qualifying employment, which is usually done during the course of qualification, as the course is often run as a 5-year apprenticeship. Chartered Legal Executives may do a wide range of legal work although, like solicitors, they generally specialise in one area. After completing their qualification, Legal Executives fill qualified lawyer roles within firms across a wide range of subject areas and can go on to fill higher up roles including as partners in firms and as judges within the judiciary.

In September 2021, the Solicitors Regulation Authority introduced the Solicitors Qualifying Examination (SQE). Potential solicitors who do not qualify under the transitional agreements with the Legal Practice Course must follow the SQE admission requirements:

- possess a degree (in any subject)
- pass both phases of SQE assessment: SQE1 (functioning legal knowledge) and SQE2 (practical legal skills)
- complete two years of qualifying work experience
- satisfy the Solicitors Regulation Authority character requirements.

Qualified lawyers already admitted in the UK or another jurisdiction have a simplified path to admission as a solicitor in England and Wales. They do not require qualified working experience and can apply for exemptions to SQE exams.

Barristers are members of the General Council of the Bar, commonly known as the Bar Council. Solicitors are members of the Law Society of England and Wales.

==== Northern Ireland ====
Northern Irish barristers are members of the Bar of Northern Ireland. The Bar of Northern Ireland and the General Council of the Bar of Northern Ireland are governed by the Constitution adopted on 5 October 1983. Northern Irish solicitors are members of the Law Society of Northern Ireland, which was established by Royal Charter on 10 July 1922.

To qualify as a barrister, one must complete a qualifying law degree (QLD) and then a Bar Postgraduate Diploma in Professional Legal Studies from the Institute of Professional Legal Studies at Queen's University Belfast. Candidates who complete these requirements are then called to the bar, but before they may practise they must complete a one-year pupillage under a practising barrister of at least seven years' standing.

Prospective solicitors must either complete a qualifying law degree or a degree in a field other than law acceptable to the Law Society's Education Committee and satisfy the Law Society that they have attained a satisfactory level of knowledge in eight specific areas of law. They must then undergo an apprenticeship under a practising solicitor known as their "master" and complete a Postgraduate Diploma in Professional Legal Studies, also known as the Solicitor Course, from the Institute of Professional Legal Studies at Queen's University Belfast. The training is divided into three months of office-based training under their master, one year of studying for their diploma with Easter, summer, and Christmas being spent in the office, and eight more months of training and work in the office under their master.

==== Scotland ====
In Scotland, a lawyer normally studies for an LL.B. in Scots law; as an Undergraduate degree. This takes three years for an ordinary degree or four years as an honours degree. The LL.B. can be taken as a graduate entry degree which takes two years. The process of admission to practice law then depends on whether a lawyer wishes to become a solicitor or an advocate.

Admission to practice as a solicitor is regulated by the Law Society of Scotland, with solicitors having to study for a one-year Diploma in Professional Legal Practice and then complete a traineeship in a law firm. Solicitors have rights of audience before the sheriff courts and justice of the peace courts.

Admission to practice as an advocate, having rights of audience before the Court of Session and the High Court of Justiciary, is regulated by the Faculty of Advocates. The Faculty of Advocates exercises this authority under the Act of Sederunt (Regulation of Advocates) 2011, which delegates the responsibility from the Court of Session. An Act of Sederunt is a form of subordinate legislation passed by the Court of Session, and the powers to regulate admission to practice as an advocate is set by Section 120 of the Legal Services (Scotland) Act 2010, which states:

120 Regulation of the Faculty

(1) The Court of Session is responsible—

(a) for—

(i) admitting persons to (and removing persons from) the office of advocate,
(ii) prescribing the criteria and procedure for admission to (and removal from) the office of advocate,

(b) for regulating the professional practice, conduct and discipline of advocates.

(2) The Court's responsibilities within subsection (1)(a)(ii) and (b) are exercisable on its behalf, in accordance with such provision as it may make for the purpose, by—

(a) the Lord President, or
(b) the Faculty of Advocates.

— Section 120, Legal Services (Scotland) Act 2010

Prospective advocates (called devils or intrants) will complete a period of training in a solicitor's office, a period of devilling, and then must pass an assessment under the Faculty's Scheme of Assessment for Devils. The Faculty publishes detailed regulations as required by the Act of Sederunt, which lay out all of the requirements for prospective Advocates.

== Oceania ==
=== Australia ===
In Australia, prospective lawyers must complete an undergraduate LL.B. or graduate JD or a Diploma in Law. All law degree courses must cover eleven specified areas of law known as the Priestley 11 in order for the degree to be recognised as a qualification for admission to practise. After obtaining a law degree, candidates must complete a practical legal training program which adheres to the Competency Standards for Entry-Level Lawyers. The requirement can be satisfied by a Graduate Diploma in Legal Studies, which is offered at various Australian legal education institutions. In Victoria and Queensland law graduates also have the option of a supervised legal training program, and in Western Australia law graduates have the option of an apprenticeship as an articled clerk.

==== Victoria ====
Under the Legal Profession Act 2004 (Vic), an individual may practise law, as a legal practitioner, in the state of Victoria if he or she has been admitted to the legal profession in any Australian jurisdiction and holds a current local or interstate practising certificate. Furthermore, the Legal Profession (Admission) Rules 2008 (Vic) replace articles of clerkship with supervised workplace training and make changes to the process of admission to practice. Under these new rules, upon completion of an approved training course and attainment of an accredited law degree, a law graduate needs to complete either a Practical Legal Training (PLT) program or Supervised Workplace Training (SWT) to be admitted to practise law in Victoria.

=== Fiji ===
Fiji requires a Bachelor of Law degree (four years of study) as well as the successful completion of either a Professional Diploma in Legal Practice from the University of the South Pacific or a Graduate Diploma in Legal Practice from the University of Fiji, or an equivalent law degree and bar admission course from abroad. Anyone admitted as a barrister or solicitor or their equivalent in a Commonwealth country may be admitted to practice law in Fiji so long as the applicant is a Commonwealth citizen, has resided in Fiji for at least three months, and has sufficient legal experience to satisfy the Chief Justice.

== See also ==
- European lawyer
