= Practising certificate =

License to practice a particular profession

A practising certificate is a licence to practise a particular profession.

In the legal profession, solicitors and barristers may need a current practising certificate before they can offer their services. The authority that administers the practising certificate varies by jurisdiction.

== Practising certificates for lawyers by jurisdiction ==
=== Australia ===
In Australia, the authority that issues the practising certificate depends on whether the lawyer is a barrister or solicitor (or in jurisdictions where these roles are fused, both) and the state or territory in which they are practising. In Queensland for example, solicitors' practising certificates are issued by the Queensland Law Society, which also functions as a representative body for solicitors. In the case of barristers, the Queensland Bar Association issues practising certificates.

=== Fiji ===
The Fiji Law Society issued practising certificates until 2009, when the government of Frank Bainimarama banned it from doing so. Lawyers' certificates were made to expire seven months early, and each lawyer was required to obtain a new certificate from the Chief Registrar of the High Court. The Law Council of Australia issued a statement, expressing concern that this was part of a move for the government to control Fiji's legal profession to prevent opponents of the military coup of 5 December 2006 from practising law.

=== Ireland ===
Solicitors in Ireland are required to have a practicing certificate in order to provide legal advice. Practicing certificates are issued by the Registrar of Solicitors at the Law Society of Ireland and solicitors must reapply annually to receive a certificate valid for one year. It is a criminal offence to practice without a certificate.

=== United Kingdom ===
==== England and Wales ====
The Solicitors Regulation Authority regulates solicitors and issues their certificates.

== See also ==
- Admission to the legal profession
