= Fanny Alving =

Swedish poet and novelist

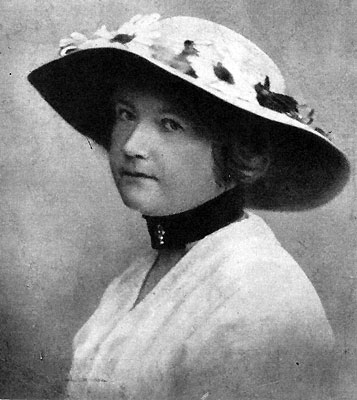
- Born: 23 October 1874; Ytterselö, Södermanland
- Died: 2 June 1955 (aged 80)
- Education: Palmgrenska Samskolan in Stockholm
- Occupations: Poet; novelist
- Spouse(s): Sven Norrman (1898 to 1905); Hjalmar Alving (from 1906 until her death)
- Children: Anders Norrman; Beat-Sofi Alving; Barbro Alving
- Relatives: Parents August Lönn and Erika Charlotta Persdotter Jonsson
- Writing career
- Pen name: Fanny Norrman and Ulrik Uhland
- Notable works: Galläpplen och paradisäpplen, poetry collection, 1901; Andra visboken, 1915; Brita från Österby, novel, 1914; Skärgårdsflirt, novel, 1905; Aurores bröllopsresor, novel, 1906; Carl Mikael Bellman och Ulla Winbland, novel, 1907

Fanny Maria Alving (23 October 1874 – 2 June 1955) was a Swedish poet and novelist who used the pseudonyms Fanny Norrman and Ulrik Uhland.

== Biography ==
Alving was born in Ytterselö, a parish on the island Selaön in Södermanland on 23 October 1874. Her parents were August Lönn (1837–1920), captain of a steamship on lake Mälaren, and Erika Charlotta Persdotter Jonsson. She was educated at Palmgrenska Samskolan in Stockholm, the first co-educational school in Scandinavia, where she matriculated in 1893. From 1898 to 1905 she was married to the statistician Sven Norrman and from 1906 to the linguist and educator Hjalmar Alving. She had three children: Anders Norrman from her first marriage, and Beat-Sofi Alving and journalist Barbro Alving from her marriage with Hjalmar Alving.

Alving travelled to Norway, Denmark and other European countries. She was a correspondent at the Greek consulate in Malmö from 1894 to 1898. Thereafter she worked for the journal Strix in Stockholm until 1901, signing her articles Maja X. Albert Engström, the founder and editor of Strix, initially refused to believe that Maja X was a woman, reportedly saying that "no woman could be that funny". As a novelist, she used the pen name Ulrik Uhland but also used Fanny Norrman and Fanny Alving.

Alving was one of the few Swedes of the day who introduced ordinary local people into her stories. She often used characters she had met on Selaön, a place she returned to frequently. Her crime novel Josefssons på Drottninggatan (The Josefssons on Queen's Street) not only includes people from Stockholm but features Sweden's first woman detective, Jullan Eriksson.

Barbro Alving has described her parents Fanny and Hjalmar as being very happy and her childhood as full of laughter. However, Fanny Alving also suffered from severe depressions, and in 1936 she had a psychotic episode which led to her being hospitalised for some time. She spent much time in her childhood home at Selaön which she found very peaceful.

She died in 1955 and is buried in the churchyard at Ytterselö Church, where Hjalmar Alving and both their daughters are also buried.

== Works ==
Published under the name Fanny Norrman

- Galläpplen och paradisäpplen, poetry collection, 1901.
- Andra visboken, 1915.
- Brita från Österby, novel, 1914.

Published under the pen name Ulrik Uhland

- Skärgårdsflirt, novel, 1905.
- Aurores bröllopsresor, novel, 1906
- Carl Michael Bellman och Ulla Winblad : en roman från den gamla goda tiden, novel, 1907.
- Fröken från Västervik, novel, 1907
- Baronerna på Sjöberga, novel, 1908.
- Skandalhuset, novel, 1911.
- Juvelerna på Gårda, novel, 1914.

Published under the name Fanny Alving

- På avigsidan, novel, 1918.
- Josefssons på Drottninggatan, novel, 1918.
- Familjen von Skotte novel, 1922.
