= Gustaf Munch-Petersen =

Danish writer and painter

Gustaf Munch-Petersen (February 18, 1912 – April 2, 1938) was a Danish writer and painter. He wrote surreal prose poems, considered groundbreaking in his time, which have inspired later writers.

== Biography ==
Gustaf Munch-Petersen grew up in a rich and respectable home; he was one of the four sons of Valfrid Palmgren (1877–1967), a Swedish-born associate professor in Swedish at Copenhagen University and Jon Julius Munch-Petersen (1873–1939), professor in Engineering Research at the Polytechnic School. He graduated from gymnasium in 1930 and thereafter started several academic courses, but none could capture his interest for more than a short period of time. Instead he focused on art while being supported financially by his parents. He made his debut as a writer with "Det nøgne menneske" (1932). His art was displayed at different exhibitions in 1932. In 1935 he moved to the Danish island of Bornholm, where he married Elisabeth "Lisbeth" Accheleie Bruhn (Lisbeth Hjort) (1908–1997). In 1937 he joined the International Brigades and fought in the Spanish Civil War, where he died the next year.

== Other sources ==
- Svend Dahl; Poul Engelstoft: Dansk skønlitterært forfatterleksikon 1900–1950, vol. 2, (Copenhagen: Grønholt Pedersen, 1959-64)
