= Ester Blenda Nordström =

Swedish journalist, author, and explorer (1891–1948)

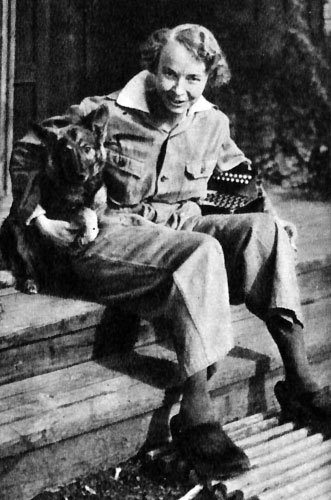
- Born: 31 March 1891; Stockholm, Sweden
- Died: 15 October 1948 (aged 57); Stockholm, Sweden
- Occupations: Journalist, author, explorer
- Notable work: En piga bland pigor (1914)
- Spouse: René Malaise (1925–1929)

Ester Blenda Elisabet Nordström (31 March 1891 – 15 October 1948) was a Swedish journalist, writer and explorer. She often published her writings under the signature Bansai. In 1914 she published En piga bland pigor which was an early form of investigative journalism and received a lot of attention. She continued with investigative journalism and later wrote reportages about Lapland, USA and Kamchatka. She also wrote a few works of fiction. In her girl's book the protagonist develops towards independence, not with marriage as the primary goal as was usual at the time.

"...Nordström began working as a journalist under the pseudonym The Boy and, at the age of twenty-three, wrote a best-selling book that exposed the harsh working conditions of household servants in Sweden. A kind of female Bruce Chatwin, Nordstrom toured around Sweden by motorcycle; hitchhiked alone across the U.S., in 1922 (and wrote a book about it); spent two years exploring Kamchatka (ditto); wrote a series of young-adult novels about tomboys; and, apparently, caused everyone she encountered, male and female, to fall in love with her."

== Biography ==
Nordström was a sister to dentist and entomologist Frithiof Nordström as well as aunt to lyricist Gunilla Sandberg. As a child, she attended Wallinska flickskolan and later Palmgrenska samskolan. She was a lesbian, which at the time was punishable by law and classified as an illness, and had a relationship with Carin Frisell that lasted her entire life.

She wrote for Svenska Dagbladet from 1911 to 1917 under the pen name Bansai. In 1914 she took a job as a maid for a month and reported on her experiences in a reportage series that made her famous: En månad som tjänsteflicka på en gård i Södermanland (A Month as a Servant Girl on a Farm in Södermanland). She also documented her experiences in a book, En piga bland pigor (A Maid Among Maids), which was a success, published in several editions, and even serialized in the 1924 film series of the same name. Nordström has been called Sweden's first undercover journalist.

Nordström continued with investigative journalism. She worked as a teacher in Lappland and lived for one year in Sami society. In 1922, she traveled to New York City on a third-class ticket and worked as a waitress and kitchen help. Later she hitchhiked throughout the US. She published her experiences in the book Amerikanskt.

From 1925 to 1929 she was married to entomologist René Malaise and participated in his research in Kamchatka in the Soviet Union. They both lived in a village there for two years, and Nordström wrote the book Byn i vulkanens skugga (The Village in the Shadow of the Volcano).

Nordström was also a pioneer in the field of children's literature, especially in books for girls. The protagonist Ann-Mari Lindelöf is similar to Nordström in, among other things, her social activism. The books describe the young woman's development into self-sufficiency, rather than being a story with marriage as the primary goal.

She is buried in Boo gamla kyrkogård.
