= Sonja Branting-Westerståhl =

Swedish lawyer and politician

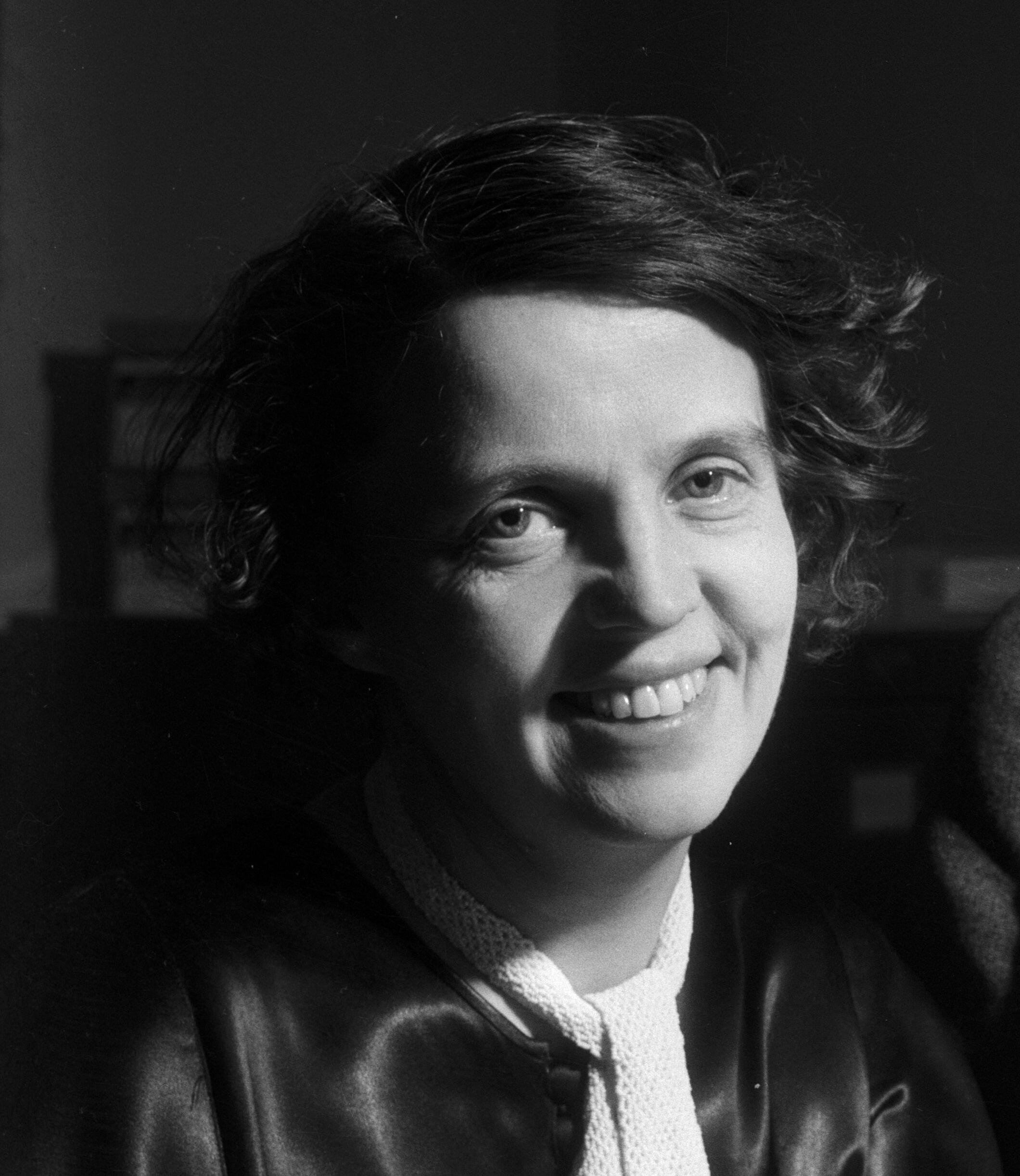

Personal details
- Born: Sonja Branting; 15 September 1890 Stockholm, Sweden
- Died: 18 July 1981 (aged 89) Stockholm, Sweden
- Party: Swedish Social Democratic Party
- Spouse: Olof Westerståhl
- Parents: Hjalmar Branting (father); Anna Branting (mother)
- Profession: Lawyer

Sonja Branting-Westerståhl (15 September 1890 – 18 July 1981) was a Swedish lawyer and politician. She was one of the first female lawyers in Sweden and specialised in matrimonial law. A social democrat, she was active in raising awareness of the rise of far-right politics in 1930s and 1940s. During the Spanish Civil War, she travelled to France and Africa and inspected refugee camps, and campaigned on against the suffering she saw. In 1948, she served in the lower house of the Riksdag, the Swedish Parliament, for a short period.

== Early life ==
Sonja Branting was born on 15 September 1890, the second child of Hjalmar Branting and Anna Branting (née Jäderin). Her father was leader of the Swedish Social Democratic Party and thrice Prime Minister of Sweden, while her mother was a journalist and writer. She attended the Palmgren school until 1909 and subsequently studied law, graduating in 1916. It was while studying law that she met her husband who was also studying the same subject.

== Career ==
After initially working for the Stockholm legal aid office, Branting-Westerståhl started a practice with her husband in 1927. She developed a specialism in matrimonial disputes and, in 1930, was appointed an advokat by the city.

Alongside her legal career, Branting-Westerståhl also followed in her parents' footsteps and was politically active, particularly around women's issues. She was a long-standing member of the Swedish Social Democratic Party which had been co-founded by her father and, between 1936 and 1952, served as a member of the executive board of the Social Democrat Women's Organisation. During that time, she joined the editorial board of the journal Morgonbris alongside Disa Västberg, who later went on to edit the magazine.

During the 1930s, Branting-Westerståhl was very active in raising awareness of the risk of nazism, including touring the United States in 1935 to speak out about the threat of totalitarianism and campaigning against the 1936 Summer Olympics in Berlin. She also campaigned on behalf of those suffering during the Spanish Civil War and inspected refugee camps in France and Africa as international delegate. After the war, she continued to be politically active and briefly sat in the Andra kammaren for the Social Democrats in 1948.

== Selected works ==
Branting-Westerståhl wrote extensively and an archive of her papers, manuscripts and correspondence is now held at the Swedish Labour Movement's Archives and Library (ARAB). Her writing included:

- Branting-Westerståhl, Sonja. (1936) Kvinnor! Se utåt!. Stockholm.
- Branting-Westerståhl, Sonja. (1935) "Vem söker skilsmässa?". Hertha. (22)3. pp. 67–70.

== Family ==
Branting-Westerståhl married Olof Westerståhl in 1914. They had one child, Jörgen, who became a political scientist. Her husband died in 1948. Branting-Westerståhl died on 18 July 1981.
