= Palmgrenska samskolan =

Coordinates: 59°20′19.8″N 18°4′45.2″E

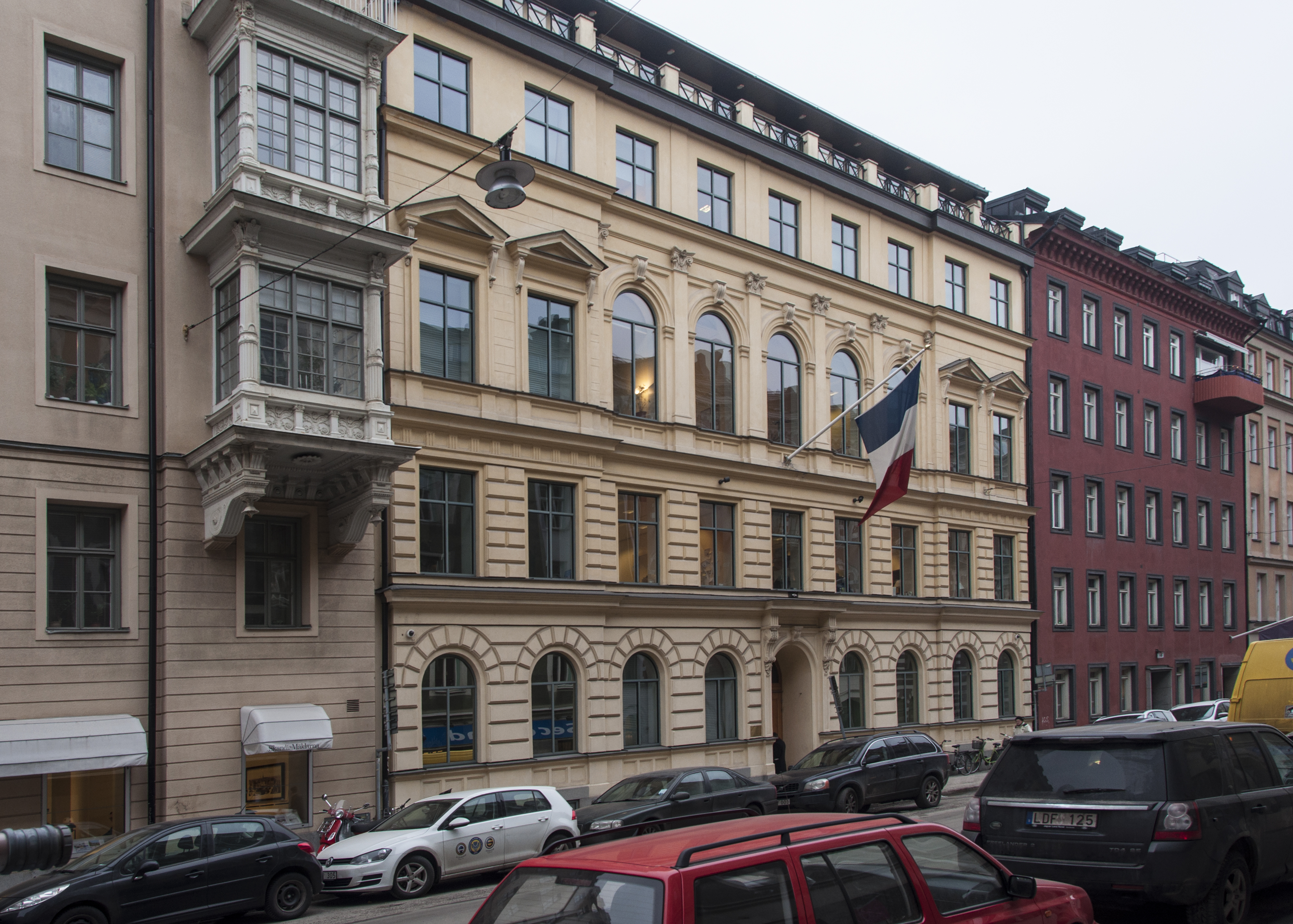
- Stockholm; Sweden

Information
- Former name: Praktiska arbetsskolan för barn och ungdom
- School type: Gymnasium; Läroverk before 1966
- Established: 16 October 1876
- Closed: 10 June 1977

Palmgrenska samskolan ('Palmgren Coeducational School'), originally Praktiska arbetsskolan för barn och ungdom ('Practical Work School for Children and Youth'), in Stockholm, Sweden, was the first school in Scandinavia to offer coeducation up to the studentexamen. It was also the first to offer sloyd, a handicraft-based education, in addition to theoretical subjects. The school changed its name to Palmgrenska samskolan in 1891–1892.

== History ==
The school was founded in 1876 by Edvard Palmgren (father of Valfrid Palmgren) who was rector until 1907. A later co-owner and rector was Carl Nordblad; the other co-owner was well-known mathematics teacher and textbook author John Hedström. Henning L. Håkanson (1892–1985) was rector from 1925 to 1963.

The school was originally located in Brunkeberg Hotel, where only sloyd was taught, but moved in 1877 to Regeringsgatan 28, where it was divided into two departments, one for reading and manual work and one exclusively for manual work. Gradually, it developed into a complete school of 12 classes in two sections, an early primary school (småskola) and a later primary school. From 1883 it received state subsidies and in 1888 the right to employ examiners for the studentexamen (at that time known as mogenhetsprövning, 'maturity exam') and in 1908 the right to take the real school examination. In 1915 the school was taken over by a joint-stock company and in 1925 by the religious Fredrika Foundation.

Between 1877 and 1938 the school had several different addresses on Malmtorgsgatan and Arsenalsgatan before settling at Kommendörsgatan 13.

Primary school was introduced gradually from 1962. The school was private but was municipalized in 1974. Operations ended on 10 June 1977 after the 100th school year. The French government bought the building in 1988 for 8.4 million SEK and has converted the exterior of the Q-marked (culturally protected) building into an embassy building.

In the autobiographical book Laterna magica, Ingmar Bergman commented on the teachers at the Palmgren Coeducational School. The film Torment is also autobiographical and deals with the school. Notable teachers include Oskar Lindberg (1910–1920) and Eric Ericson (1944–1952).

== Notable students (selection) ==
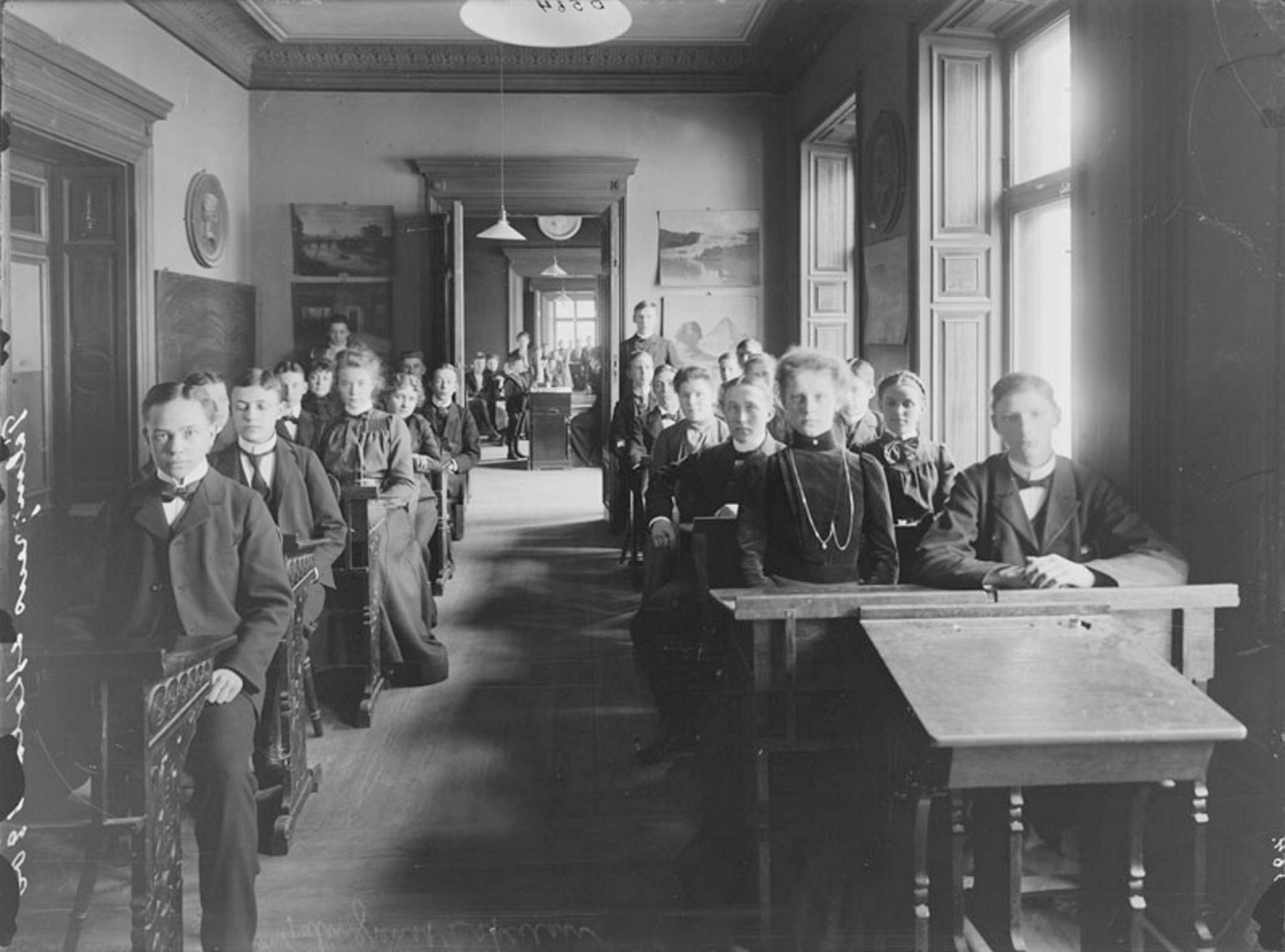
Palmgrenska samskolan at Malmtorgsgatan 1, ca. 1900

- Lena Adelsohn Liljeroth (born 1955), minister of culture
- Fanny Alving (1874–1955), author
- Ingmar Bergman (1918–2007), director
- Ingrid Bergman (1915–1982), actress
- Åke Bonnier (born 1957), bishop
- Sonja Branting-Westerståhl (1890–1981), lawyer
- Karin Ekelund (1913–1976), actress
- Charles de Champs (1873–1959), Navy officer
- Yngve Larsson (1881–1977), municipal commissioner
- Ester Blenda Nordström (1891–1948), journalist and author
- Valfrid Palmgren Munch-Petersen (1877–1967), linguist and educator
