= Admission to practice law =

Receiving a license to practice law

An admission to practice law is occupational licensing required to practice law. In jurisdictions with two types of lawyers, as with barristers and solicitors, barristers must gain admission to the bar whereas for solicitors there are distinct practising certificates.

Becoming a lawyer is a widely varied process around the world. Common to all jurisdictions are requirements of age and competence; some jurisdictions also require documentation of citizenship or immigration status. However, the most varied requirements are those surrounding the preparation for the license, whether it includes obtaining a law degree, passing an exam, or serving in an apprenticeship. In English, admission is also called a law license. Basic requirements vary from country to country.

In some jurisdictions, after admission, the lawyer needs to maintain a current practising certificate to be permitted to offer services to the public.

== See also ==
- Admission to practice law by country
- Bar (law)
- Lawyer
- Practice of law
- Disbarment
- Practising certificate
