= Valfrid Palmgren =

Swedish educator and linguist (1877–1967)

Valfrid Palmgren Munch-Petersen
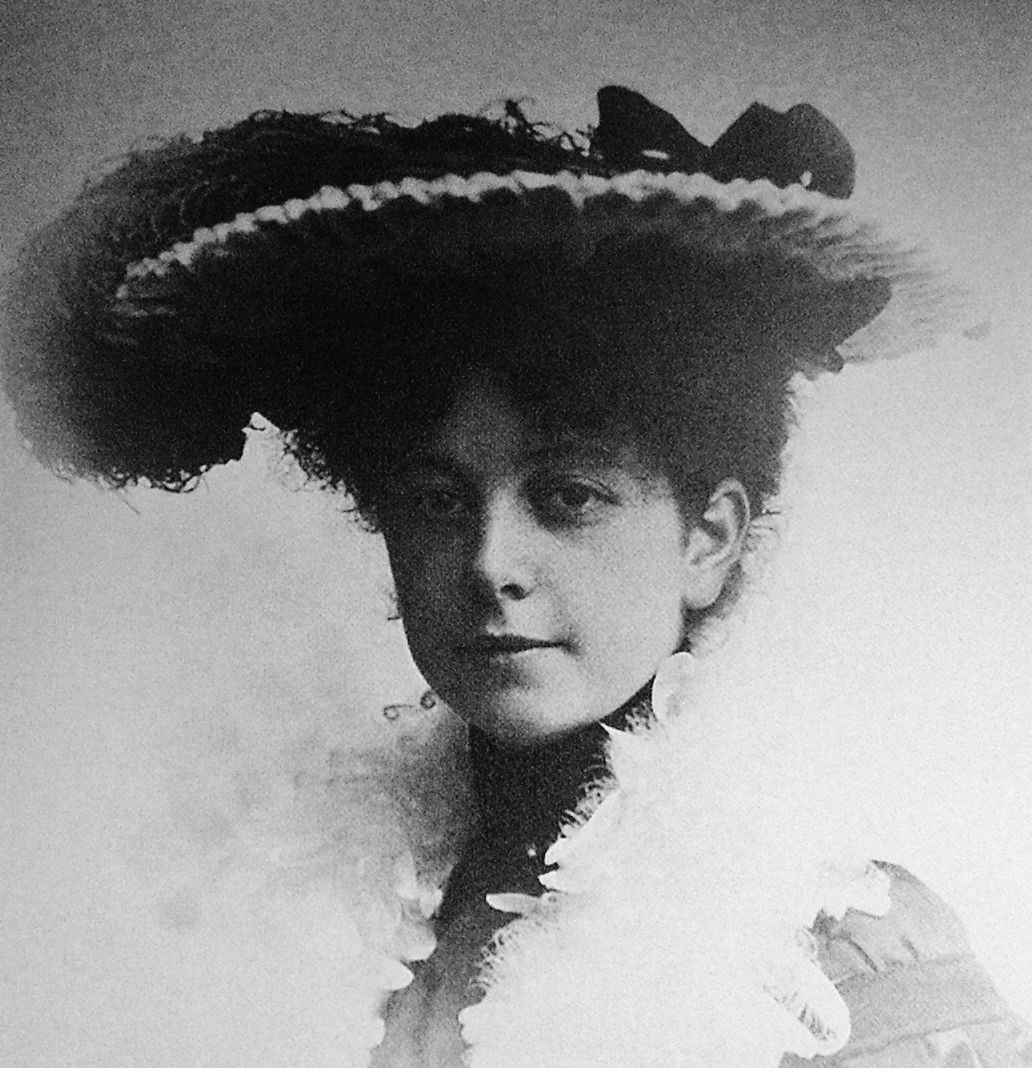
- Born: Alfhild Matilda Palmgren; 3 June 1877; Stockholm, Sweden
- Died: 6 December 1967 (aged 90); Gentofte, Denmark
- Education: University of Uppsala
- Occupations: Linguist, educator, pioneer in the public library system
- Spouse: Jon Julius Munch-Petersen (m. 1911; died 1939)
- Children: Gustaf Munch-Petersen
- Parent(s): Edvard Palmgren, Ida Palmgren, née Pohl

Alfhild Valfrid Matilda Palmgren, as married Palmgren Munch-Petersen (3 June 1877 – 6 December 1967), was a Swedish educator, linguist, and politician. She reformed Swedish library policy and introduced the public library system in Sweden and Denmark.

== Biography ==
=== Upbringing and education ===
Valfrid Palmgren was born in Stockholm, Sweden, on 3 June 1877, the second daughter of Karl Edvard A. H. Palmgren (1840–1910) and Ida Teresia Pohl (1853–1937), and was known as "Vava" at home. Her siblings were elder sister Signe Maria Elisabet (born 1875), Sigrid Hildegun Anna (1882–1883) and Gustaf (born 1884). She would have had another brother, but he had died by the time of her birth in 1886. Growing up, Valfrid and her sister Signe were treated as equal to all other children – regardless of gender – in accordance with their parents' educational ideas.

In 1882, Valfrid and Signe were enrolled in their father's school, Palmgrenska samskolan, which was the first school in Europe to offer co-education up to graduation, where they attended together until the twelfth year. Their father said morning prayers and taught Christianity, history and geography. Their aunt Ida taught writing and handicrafts (sloyd). Their mother was assistant headmistress and taught Swedish. The schoolchildren were also taught foreign languages – German, English and French – based on the modern method of starting from the spoken language. In 1895 Palmgren passed her oral and written examinations, with good grades in languages in particular. She was herself active there as a teacher from 1896 to 1907.

She spent summers with her family at Toivo on Norra Lagnö (in the present-day municipality of Värmdö), and later at Ramlösa mineral spa when her father's health began to fail. Palmgren and her siblings also had the opportunity to make short and long educational trips in Europe: in 1893 she spent two months in Germany, and the following year in France and England for three and a half months with her sister. Such trips were made every year and year-and-a-half thereafter.

Palmgren enrolled at Uppsala University in the spring semester of 1896, where she chose to study language. Parallel to her studies, she worked as a teacher at the Palmgrenska samskolan, teaching German, mathematics and geography, and later also French. In 1900, a government grant of SEK 750 enabled her to travel to England and study at Oxford for six months.

In 1901 Palmgren graduated from Uppsala University with a bachelor's degree in German, English, Romance languages, practical philosophy, mathematics and theoretical philosophy. Two years later she received her licentiate of philosophy in Romance languages and theoretical philosophy, followed by her doctorate in 1905. Her doctoral thesis was on the use of the infinitive by the French Calvinist and Baroque poet Théodore Agrippa d'Aubigné (Observations sur l'infinitif dans Agrippa d'Aubigné) and was dedicated to her parents. In 1905, Palmgren was the third woman in Sweden to receive a doctorate in Romance languages, after Anna Ahlström in 1899 and Gerda Östberg in 1903.

=== Royal Library ===
In 1903, Palmgren had contacted Carl Snoilsky, head librarian at the Royal Library (Kungliga biblioteket), but her request for employment was not granted. He advised her to take her doctorate first. Before she completed her doctoral thesis in May 1905, Palmgren approached Snoilsky's successor, head librarian Erik Wilhelm Dahlgren; he was significantly more positive and offered her a probationary position from September of that year as the first female librarian. The probationary position was converted on 24 November 1905 into a position as an additional regular librarian assistant in the printing department.

Palmgren remained there until February 1911, when she resigned at her own request to marry and move to Copenhagen.

KB's cafeteria, Kafé Valfrid, is named after her.

=== Study trip to the United States ===
In her work at the Royal Library, Palmgren often had to inform visitors hungry for knowledge that most of the library's books were not for home loan and refer them to public or workers' libraries. But she soon realized (after visiting the public libraries) that they did not have the literature she was looking for and were not intended for people who wanted to study. She then realized that she needed to travel to the pioneering United States. She applied for and was awarded a travel grant from the (Ecclesiastical Department, at that time responsible for education) to "study library science with special reference to seminary, school and public libraries".

She arrived in New York in September 1907, with a letter of introduction in English, German and French from the Ecclesiastical Department, and was received by the famous children's librarian Anne Carroll Moore at the New York Public Library. She and Palmgren became good friends and kept in touch until Moore's death in 1961. They were both passionate about the educational role of libraries and saw themselves as pioneers and drivers in providing quality children's books to all children through good children's libraries. Palmgren referred to Moore as an inspiration.

Palmgren visited some thirty cities in nine states in the northeastern United States during her three-month trip, where she studied public libraries, research libraries, library schools, seminaries and regular public schools. She gave lectures on Swedish libraries, and her visits were frequently covered in the press. Palmgren was even invited to the White House by President Theodore Roosevelt when she visited Washington.

When Palmgren returned to Sweden at the end of December, she immediately started giving lectures and courses to disseminate what she had learned during her study trip. She wrote a very brief official travelogue, which she then expanded considerably in her detailed report Bibliotek och folkuppfostran – anteckningar från en studieresa i Amerikas Förenta Stater ('Library and Public Education – Notes from a Study Tour in the United States of America'). This was finally published in 1909. Hugo Hammarskjöld, the Ecclesiastical Department Minister (education minister), had read her account and wanted it to be distributed to all libraries and public schools, so of the 3,000 copies, the Ecclesiastical Department bought 1,200 for that purpose.

Palmgren's report was a detailed and enthusiastic account, intended both as a textbook, to convince readers of the necessity of libraries in a modern society, and to inspire a reorganization of the Swedish library system based on the good examples she had studied in the United States. She pointed out the differences from Swedish libraries, which were usually supported by fees from patrons or voluntary donations from better-off members of society. This made them a kind of charitable institution, whereas in the US municipalities accepted donations in the form of library buildings or book collections; however, the material came from the local population, so that they owned their libraries just as they owned their schools. American libraries – both academic and public – catered to all walks of life and all ages; they were thus intended for all members of society without distinction. The beautiful and well-equipped library rooms with their open shelves were inviting, had generous opening hours and catalogs that were easy to use.

Palmgren pointed out that an important prerequisite for the success of American libraries was the formation of the national American Library Association (ALA) in 1876, regional library associations and the Library Journal. Through association work, meetings and journal articles, librarians had collectively succeeded in arousing the interest of decision-makers and in gaining both organizational and financial support for their activities – and it was precisely these ideas and methods that Palmgren took home with her and put into practice or helped to put into practice in Sweden. This happened through the Stockholm Children's and Youth Library, which was opened in 1911 with financial contributions from wealthy Stockholmers, the formation of the Swedish Public Library Association in 1915 (from 2000 the Swedish Library Association) and the launch of Biblioteksbladet in 1916.

=== Library researcher and election to the city council ===
In 1909, the Heimdal Association published Palmgren's "Biblioteket – en ljushärd" in its series of small publications. This was a popular version of her travel report "Bibliotek och folkuppfostran" ('Libraries and Public Education'), and it was aimed at politicians and other decision-makers, association members, teachers and others who needed to be convinced of the benefits of books and libraries. The popular version devoted considerably more space to children's libraries than the original report. Her book Bibliotek och folkuppfostran was translated into Finnish and Danish and helped to stimulate the establishment of modern public libraries in the other Nordic countries.

At the end of the year, she became a member of the Committee for the Promotion of Good and Affordable Reading, and on behalf of the American Library Association she compiled the "Selected list of Swedish books recommended for public libraries", with a selection of non-fiction and fiction for children and adults in Swedish. In December 1909, Palmgren was appointed sole investigator of the "library question".

In February 1910 she published another publication, Om folkuppfostran 'On Popular Education', in which she described library conditions in Germany after a short study trip to Dortmund in October of the previous year. In it, she emphasized the ambitions of the German public educators and that, unlike in Sweden, there was a great deal of support for public education in broad circles in Germany – even among businessmen and industrialists – as well as a consensus to leave politics and religion out of it.

In the municipal elections of March 1910, Palmgren was elected as the second woman to the Stockholm City Council (Stadsfullmäktige) – the first was Social Democrat Gertrud Månsson – for the General Electoral League. On 1 April of the same year, she took her seat on the city council, and on 20 June she gave a highly publicized and discussed speech on the "library issue".

She was also a member of the Committee on State Aid to Institutions for Popular Scientific Lectures, which submitted its report in January 1911. She was also a member of the Central Library Committee and of the board of the National Association for Women's Suffrage (Föreningen för kvinnans politiska rösträtt, FKPR), while participating in the preparations for the opening of the Stockholm Children's and Youth Library. She attended the board meeting of the Stockholm Children's and Youth Library Association on 27 April 1911, three days before her wedding, after which she moved with her husband Jon Julius Munch-Petersen (1873–1939) to Copenhagen. However, as she still had several important tasks to complete in Stockholm, she commuted between the cities for the rest of the year and into the following year.

During the Conservative government of Prime Minister Arvid Lindman, she was asked to write a report proposing a new policy on libraries based on her international expertise and on the idea of popular enlightenment. On 28 September 1911, she submitted her library report "Förslag angående de åtgärder som från statens sida bör vidtagas för främjande af det allmänna biblioteksväsendet i Sverige" 'Proposals concerning the measures that should be taken by the state to promote the public library system in Sweden' to the Ecclesiastical Department Minister, Elof Lindström. The main proposals were that the use of public libraries should be free of charge and that support could be given to all school libraries, to a municipal library or library system in each municipality, and to nationwide associations with at least 20,000 members for library activities in study circles. She worked for reforms in the policy of the Swedish libraries, demanding that public libraries be open to all, that there be a public library accessible in each city, and that the libraries be free from political, commercial and religious censorship.

In October, Palmgren Munch-Petersen conducted a course in library technology for staff working at the future children's and youth library on Drottninggatan, which opened in December of the same year. In November 1911, she was appointed as an expert in the Committee on State Support for Public Libraries.

On 12 April 1912, the new Minister of Education, Fridtjuv Berg, presented a bill that in principle followed Palmgren Munch-Petersen's proposals for a library inquiry. However, a deviation was made regarding the name issue, where the collective term for parish libraries, municipal libraries and association libraries became "public libraries" and not "municipal libraries"; the latter had been proposed by the expert group and Palmgren Munch-Petersen. On 23 September of the same year, the Riksdag passed a resolution "concerning support for the public library system" without debate.

=== Marriage and family life ===
Palmgren was almost 34 when she married Jon Julius Munch-Petersen in 1911, a hydraulic engineer and lecturer at the Technical University of Denmark, whom she had met in the early 1900s during their family's summer stays at Ramlösa mineral spa, south of Helsingborg. When she was officially invited by the Copenhagen City Council in her capacity as a member of the Stockholm City Council in September 1910, she and Munch-Petersen met again and became a couple. In a letter to author Selma Lagerlöf, she describes her husband:

He's not quite like most people. And either you love him or you don't understand him at all. I think that he is related in some way to the violin-playing Värmlanders, of whom you have given us such beautiful pictures, a kind of modern Liljekrona, if you like.

They became engaged later in the autumn in Copenhagen and celebrated their wedding in Stockholm on 30 April 1911. They then moved to Denmark, where she lived for the rest of her life, 56 years. She left seemingly everything behind: her family and friends, her professional life and politics. But she was not content to become a housewife, and quite immediately began to build up a new and extensive professional activity in her new home country, as soon as she had finished her commitments in Sweden, and she continued throughout the years to keep in touch with friends and colleagues in Sweden. She always used both surnames, Valfrid Palmgren Munch-Petersen, or with the titles Lektor Dr phil. Mrs. Valfrid Palmgren Munch-Petersen, and never just Valfrid Munch-Petersen because she was keen to emphasize her own identity and not to appear as an appendage of her husband.

Palmgren Munch-Petersen's beloved brother Gustaf Palmgren died only 27 years old on 17 May 1911 after a period of illness, and when Valfrid and Jon Julius Munch-Petersen's first son was born on 18 February 1912, he was named Gustaf. In July 1913 their second son was born, named after Jon's brother Harald, who had died in a mountaineering accident in the French Alps in 1904. A third son, Finn, was born in September 1915, and a fourth son, Jon (called Lill-Jon), was born in July 1919.

Palmgren Munch-Petersen made it her task in her new home country to work for the Swedish language, literature and culture, in addition to her growing family. She taught at the teachers' training college and the University of Copenhagen, served as a member of the board for the Copenhagen municipal library, was very active in the Swedish Gustaf's Church lecture society, and also began work on Swedish-Danish dictionaries.

Her husband gradually began to lose his hearing from the early 1920s and eventually became completely deaf. Palmgren then accompanied her husband to his conferences and meetings and wrote down everything that was said so that he could still follow the discussions. They were both committed members of Foreningen Norden, where she was for a time an alternate member of the board.

In 1937, Palmgren Munch-Petersen's mother died. In September 1938, Valfrid and Jon Julius received the news that their son Gustaf Munch-Petersen had been reported missing in action in Spain, where he had participated on the government's side against Franco and the Falangists. In February 1939, Jon Julius died after failing health for several years. Palmgren Munch-Petersen worked like a madman, writing to her friend Anna-Lenah Elgström-Collijn: "If I am given too much time to brood, I will not last."

Denmark was occupied by Germany in April 1940. Palmgren Munch-Petersen remained in Denmark and spoke on the radio about Swedish literature for attacking the occupying power, and was therefore threatened. This worried the Swedish ambassador, who provided her with a Swedish passport as a precaution (she had automatically become a Danish citizen through her marriage to Jon Julius Munch-Petersen in 1911).

=== Sons ===
Her son Gustaf Munch-Petersen had had difficulty finding the right path in life. He had studied philosophy and psychology at the University of Copenhagen and art history at Lund University before realizing he would become a writer, and in 1932 he made his debut with "det nøgne menneske" 'The Naked Man', the publication of which was paid for by his parents, as were his later works. In 1935 he made his debut as a visual artist at a collective exhibition of surrealist art in Copenhagen, and later also in Oslo. Gustaf married Bornholm ceramicist Lisbeth Hjort in 1936, and in September their first daughter, Mette, was born. They were expecting their second child in December 1937, when Gustaf suddenly left as early as November to join the International Brigades fighting Franco's fascists in Spain. He did not tell his pregnant wife where he was going, but had only confided in his mother. Palmgren Munch-Petersen's relationship with Lisbeth and her grandchildren Mette and Ursula Munch-Petersen became very conflict-ridden after Gustaf's death, especially since a death certificate was needed for Gustaf in order for Lisbeth to remarry Paul Høm, who already had three children, and who then had three more children with Lisbeth, so they had a total of eight children to support. Granddaughter Ursula, who like her sister Mette periodically lived with Palmgren Munch-Petersen, thought during her childhood that her grandmother should have helped them financially, and only much later, when both her grandmother and mother were away, did she learn that her grandmother had sent money to her mother every month for the care of the grandchildren.

Her son Finn Munch-Petersen graduated with a bachelor's degree in political science and then participated in international relief work after World War II. He worked both in New York and Jerusalem, a very troubled area in 1948, which worried Palmgren Munch-Petersen. Finn's son, Nils Finn, lived with Palmgren Munch-Petersen while his parents worked separately and were in the process of getting divorced.

Her son Jon Munch-Petersen became a civil engineer and a researcher in chemistry. His wife Agnete Munch-Petersen was also a scientist, and they had children Sten and Christine, who lived with their grandmother from time to time, especially when Lill-Jon was ill with polio.

Palmgren Munch-Petersen became pessimistic in her old age, doubting that she had done the right thing by working so hard. In a letter to Lisbeth Wesche, she writes that she had no faith left and felt she had wasted 28 years of her life on one pointless useless thing – the large dictionary. And when Lisbeth had told her about a trip to Verona with her children, Palmgren Munch-Petersen asked herself "Why didn't I make such trips with my children instead of hanging over the stupid dictionary!" Palmgren Munch-Petersen constantly missed Sweden during all her years in Denmark:

You can become as acclimatized as you like, have it as "good" as you like, gain sympathy and understanding, and yet the grass itself is greenest on the turf where you played as a child.

=== Lecturer and educator in Denmark ===
In Denmark, Palmgren Munch-Petersen continued her work on library and women's issues. She was a member of the board of the Copenhagen Municipal Library from 1918 to 1936, and the minutes of the board show that she shared her experience of working on library issues in Stockholm. As early as 1914, she became a member of the board of the Danish Women's Society, a nonpartisan women's organization that fought for Danish women's right to vote and to education and paid employment. Danish women were given the right to vote in the Folketing in 1915.

Palmgren Munch-Petersen also began teaching at the Danish Teachers' College in 1914, and continued to do so for 45 years, until 1959. She had one to three courses a year, plus two-week courses in the summers. She discovered how little Danes and Swedes knew about each other and how skewed the image of Swedes was in the Danish press. She was particularly interested in how textbooks portrayed Sweden and the Swedes.

In 1916, Palmgren Munch-Petersen contacted Verner Dahlerup, a professor of Nordic languages at the University of Copenhagen, and offered to teach Swedish language and literature, initially without pay. Her offer was accepted and Palmgren Munch-Petersen became the first woman to be employed at the university, giving her first lecture in April of that year. Two years later, she was given a permanent position as a lecturer in Swedish, becoming the second lecturer in Swedish at a foreign university and the first woman to do so. Her lectures were highly appreciated by both students and the public, who attended her open lectures in their hundreds. She remained a lecturer in Swedish until 1949, when she was 71 years old.

Through the Danish radio station Statsradiofonien, today the Danish Broadcasting Corporation, Palmgren Munch-Petersen was offered a further arena for her lecturing activities. On 17 November 1926, she gave her first radio lecture, which was on Swedish workers' poetry. She continued with radio lectures for 28 years, until 1954, first twice, then once a week, and the last year every two weeks. They were of varying lengths and at varying times, and under the heading Swedish, where she was able to address whatever she wanted and received a great response from listeners. Together with Ellen Hartmann, she published three books entitled Svensk – texthäfte till radioundervisning ('Swedish – booklet for radio education') with excerpts from the texts of Swedish authors. The two also worked together on Swedish school radio, publishing the textbooks Svensk läsebok för skolradio and Dansk litteratur.

During the German occupation of Denmark, she used her radio lectures to encourage the Danish people. She read Strindberg's tale of the swallow singing to the prisoners, recited Swedish freedom poems, recited "Bishop Thomas's Freedom Song" ("Biskop Thomas frihetsvisa"), Tegnér's "The Eternal" ("Det eviga") and Fröding's "Ur Anabasis". And she explained Swedish words that had been mentioned on Swedish radio, which many Danes listened to, even though the German censors had forbidden it. Towards the end of the war, the German occupying forces were so annoyed by her radio lectures that the Danish Freedom Council ordered her to go into hiding. So in September 1944, her good friend and doctor Harald Abrahamsen admitted her as Mrs Poulsen to Bispebjerg Hospital, where she was kept in hiding for eight months.

=== Commitment to the Nordic countries, peace and women's issues ===
In 1919, Denmark, Norway and Sweden founded the Nordic Association to deepen the sense of belonging between the Nordic peoples, broaden their cultural and economic ties and promote mutual cooperation. Finland and Iceland joined several years later. The Danish Women's Society, in which Palmgren Munch-Petersen was active, was also a driving force in these efforts to increase cooperation between the Nordic countries. In May 1943, at the Danish Women's Society district meeting, she spoke about the women's cause and Nordic cooperation and stated that "there is no cause – except war and violence – that is not a women's cause." The issue of peace was important to her even before she moved to Denmark and became even more important after the Second World War. In 1948, she was one of the founders of the Danish Democratic Women's Society, (Danmarks Demokratiske Kvindeforbund, DDK), which was a peace organization within the framework of the Women's International Democratic Federation, had consultative status at the United Nations and was the only international women's organization recognized by the Soviet Union. Until 1957, Palmgren Munch-Petersen was also active in the Women's Regency (Kvinderegensen), a dormitory for female university students founded in 1932, where two of her daughters-in-law had lived during their student days.

=== Contact with Sweden and later years ===
Throughout her years in Denmark, Palmgren Munch-Petersen kept in touch with Sweden, where her mother lived until 1937, and her sister Signe and her family lived in Stockholm. She was a frequent lecturer in Sweden as well, and every year at Christmas time she visited Malmö's Children's and Youth Library, which she had helped to found in connection with the Baltic Exhibition in Malmö in 1914. Almost every year she attended the annual meeting of the Stockholm Children's and Youth Library or some other board meeting. She took part in the festivities at the opening of Stockholm City Hall on Midsummer's Eve 1923, and was one of the guests of honour at the opening of the Stockholm City Library on 31 March 1928. She was the keynote speaker at the 50th anniversary celebration of the Stockholm Children's and Youth Library on 4 December 1961. She gave a nostalgic and emotional speech, Bernhard Tarschys talked about his years at the children's library, and under the direction of Elsa Olenius the theatre children performed scenes from Pelle Snygg och barnen i Snaskeby. She was appointed an honorary member of the Swedish Public Library Association at the great sixth Nordic Library Meeting in Uppsala in June 1950, where she gave one of her much-appreciated speeches:

Valfrid Palmgren spoke quietly, but not one word came through in the vast hall... And what is it we librarians want? We want to teach people to be human, to live humanly... Valfrid Palmgren's speech opened a window.

— Bengt Hallvik, review in Biblioteksbladet, p. 225. 1950

On 31 May 1955, Palmgren Munch-Petersen was awarded a jubilee doctorate at Uppsala University to mark the fiftieth anniversary of her doctorate.

Palmgren Munch-Petersen also maintained contacts with the Royal Library of Sweden over the years. She handed over her archive in batches, gave lectures to the staff about her years there, and also to the Association for Book Crafts in February 1959.

Palmgren Munch-Petersen herself also contributed articles to Swedish newspapers and magazines, often on the themes of "lack of understanding between Danes and Swedes", "Swedishness", "Scandinavianism", "Nordic language union", as well as on literature and women's issues. She was very active almost to the end and was honored with tributes and newspaper articles on her 70th, 75th and 80th birthdays. And especially so on her 70th birthday, when she received a large gift of money for her trip as a representative of the University of Copenhagen to the ALA Library Conference in San Francisco in 1947. She then took the opportunity to stay in the US for over three months to visit libraries, visit her son Finn and her old friend Anne Carroll Moore.

She saw the publication of her son Gustaf's collected writings begin in 1959, and his artistry and fate attracted new attention. Palmgren Munch-Petersen also saw her granddaughter Ursula Munch-Petersen become a famous and successful ceramicist of public art as well as at Bing & Grøndahl and the Royal Porcelain Factory.

Palmgren Munch-Petersen spent her last years in a nursing home in Gentofte, Denmark, where she died on December 6, 1967, at the age of 90.

== Honors ==
- 1924: Litteris et artibus – a Swedish royal medal awarded for outstanding artistic achievements, including in literature.
- 1932: Illis quorum – a medal awarded by the Swedish government for contributions to Swedish culture, science or society.
- 1954: Dannebrogen – a Danish award, together with Ellen Hartmann
- 1955: Jubliee doctorate from the University of Uppsala
- 1959: The Swedish Academy's Language Prize for "outstanding achievements in Swedish language research and language preservation".
