= René Malaise =

Swedish entomologist, explorer, art collector and inventor (1892-1978)

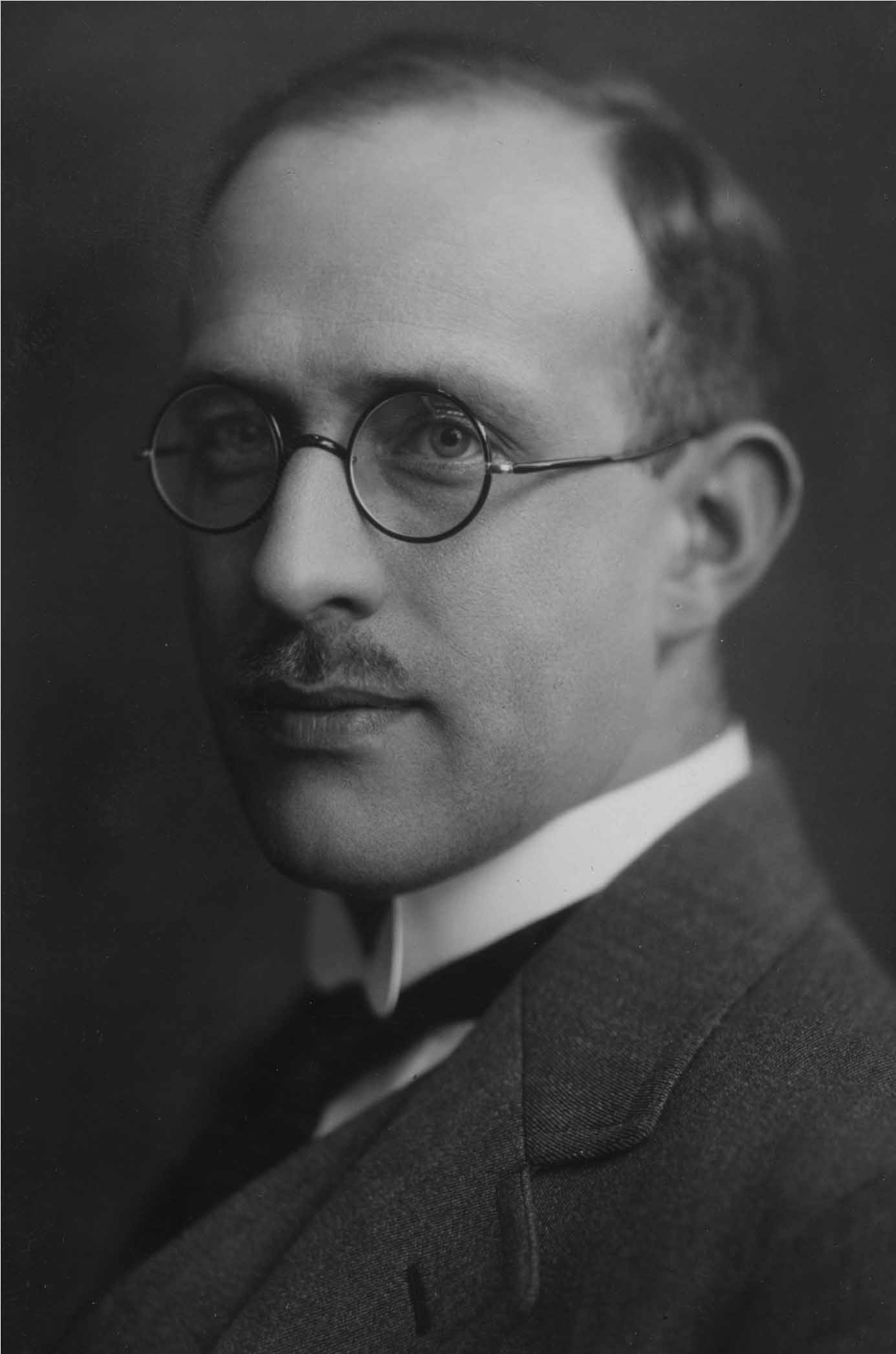
- René Malaise, 1920s
- Born: René Edmond Malaise; 29 September 1892
- Died: 1 July 1978 (aged 85)
- Occupations: Entomologist, explorer, art collector, inventor

René Edmond Malaise (29 September 1892 – 1 July 1978) was a Swedish entomologist, explorer, art collector and inventor who is mostly known for his invention of the Malaise trap and his systematic collection of thousands of insects.

== Early career ==
As an explorer he took part in an expedition to Kamchatka between 1920 and 1922 along with Sten Bergman and Eric Hultén. Malaise eventually left the others and arrived in Kamakura, Japan in August 1923, just days before the great earthquake on 31 August 1923 which he witnessed from a short distance before his return to Stockholm. He then traveled back to Kamchatka in 1924 along with his fiancée, the journalist, writer and explorer Ester Blenda Nordström and did not return from the Soviet Union until 1930. On 31 August 1925 Ester Blenda married him on Kamchatka. They would divorce in 1929.

== Later life ==
In 1933 he married Ebba Söderhell, a teacher of biology and religion from Stockholm.

Malaise then set out on another expedition of his own to northern Burma between 1933 and 1935, with Ebba accompanying him on the trip. It was here, in Yangon (Rangoon) in 1934, that he had five insect traps of his own construction manufactured, effectively inventing the "Malaise trap". During this trip he collected some 100,000 insects, many of these totally unknown to entomology before Malaise's endeavor. Between 1953 and 1958 he supervised the entomological department of the Swedish Museum of Natural History.

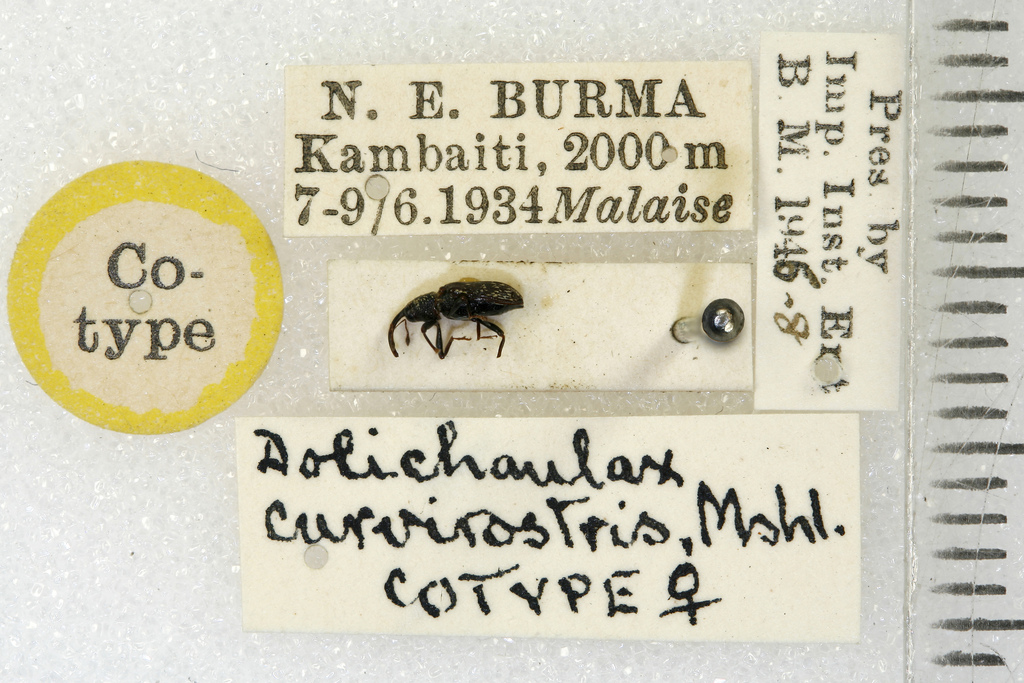
A weevil (Coleoptera:Curculionidae) collected in Burma by René Malaise: now a type specimen of Dolichaulax curvirostris Marshall, housed in the Natural History Museum, London

His only endeavor into geology was his book Atlantis, en geologisk verklighet ("Atlantis, a geological reality"), in which he claimed that Alfred Wegener's theory of plate tectonics was incorrect, that the migration of species has been helped by a sunken continent of Atlantis, and he defended the "constriction theory" of paleozoologist Nils Odhner. It was widely ridiculed by the scientific community.

In his later years he spent most of his time building up a large art collection, including works of Rembrandt.

== Sources ==
There is no written biography on Malaise, but Fredrik Sjöberg's essay Flugfällan contains several chapters with tidbits from the life of Malaise that he has found in different places.
