= Anna Branting =

Swedish journalist and writer

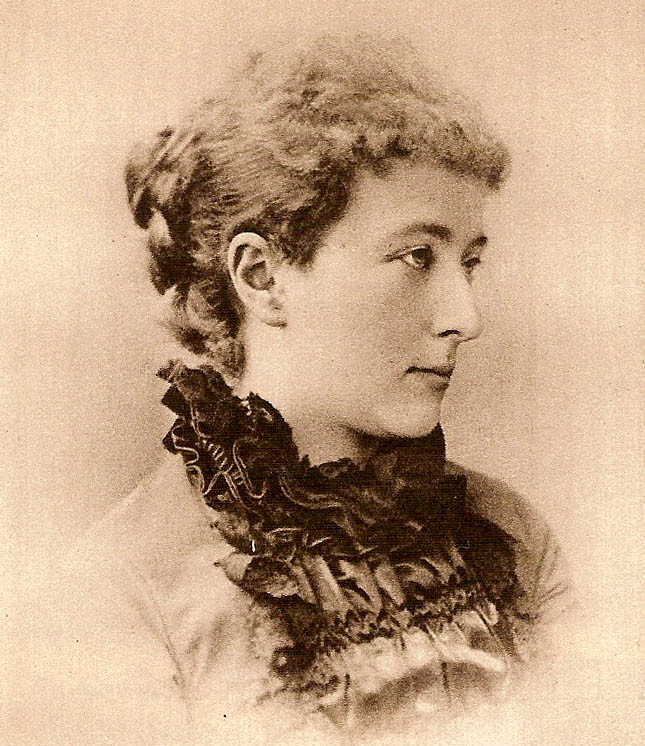
- Branting c. 1884
- Born: 19 November 1855; Stockholm, Sweden
- Died: 11 December 1950 (aged 95); Stockholm, Sweden
- Occupations: journalist, writer
- Spouse: Hjalmar Branting
- Children: Georg Branting; Sonja Branting-Westerståhl

Anna Matilda Charlotta Branting (née Jäderin; 19 November 1855 – 11 December 1950), was a Swedish journalist and writer. She was a Social Democrat and married to Swedish prime minister Hjalmar Branting. From the 1880s to 1917, she was an influential theater critic in the Stockholm press under the pseudonym Réne.

== Life ==
Anna Branting's parents were police inspector Erik Jäderin and Charlotta Gustava Holm. She married lieutenant and nobleman Gustav Vilhelm von Kraemer (1851–1884) in 1877, and divorced him in 1883. She married secondly to Hjalmar Branting in 1884. She had two children with her first husband, Vera and Henry von Kraemer, and two with her second, Georg Branting and Sonja Branting.

She was educated at the statens normalskola för flickor in 1868–72. She was a journalist at the papers Tiden in 1884–1886; at the Socialdemokraten in 1886–1892, in Stockholmstidningen 1892–1909, and a second time in Socialdemokraten in 1913–1917. Anna Branting belonged to a pioneer generation of women journalists, who had their breakthrough in the Swedish press in the 1880s, and she belonged to the first group of women to be given a permanent position at a newspaper.

She started working as a translator after her divorce and was given a position at the paper of Branting, who was to become her second spouse: after he lost his fortune, she long supported the family. From 1892 she had a successful career as a theater critic, respected and feared because of her sharp and witty reviews and a permanent reserved seat at the Royal Dramatic Theatre. Anna Branting belonged to the first 14 women, who became members of the Swedish Publicists' Association in 1885.

Politically, she was a Social Democrat and a member of the Social Democratic Women's Club, though she was never very active in the political movement, focusing more on her literary career. She did, however, make a significant exception in 1902 when she, Elin Engström and Erika Lindqvist were among the Social Democratic women who co-founded the National Association for Women's Suffrage and supported the cooperation of the Social Democratic Women with the suffrage movement.

She debuted as a novelist in 1893. The main theme of her novels was a part of contemporary debate: the conflict between a woman, brought up under circumstances shaped by an older society, but frustrated because her views and longing belonged to the new society, which were at the time undergoing a rapid change in women's role.

== Bibliography ==
- Lena, en bok om fruntimmer af René, (pseud. René) novel 1893.
- Sju martyrer. Berättelser från den husliga härden af René, novels 1894.
- Staden. En sedeskildring ur stockholmslifvet, (pseud. René) novel 1901. translated to Danish by Vilhelm Holm as: Byen : en Samfundsroman .
- Romresan, travel story 1907.
- Kultur och alkohol : några ord i en viktig fråga, political work 1902.
- Fåfänglighet. En bok, novel 1910.
- Valérie. Roman, 1912.
- Jungfrun går jägarspår : roman novel 1930.
- Min långa resa : boken om Hjalmar och mig, biography 1945.
