= Truman Bodden Law School =

Law school in George Town, Cayman Islands

Coordinates: 19.29591°N 81.38114°W

Truman Bodden Law School of the Cayman Islands
- Type: Public law school
- Established: 1982
- Affiliations: University of Liverpool; Oxford Brookes University
- Location: George Town, Grand Cayman, Cayman Islands
- Campus: Urban
- Website: https://www.caymanlawschool.ky/

Truman Bodden Law School (previously known as Cayman Islands Law School) is a law school based in George Town, Cayman Islands affiliated with the University of Liverpool and Oxford Brookes University in the UK. It was founded in 1982 by the Governor of the Cayman Islands and subsequently named after Truman Bodden, in recognition of the role that he played in the establishment of the law school.

The school offers two qualifications: Full and part-time programmes leading to the Bachelor of Law (Honours) Degree of the University of Liverpool and attorney at law qualification of the Cayman Islands.
