= Georg Branting =

Swedish politician and fencer

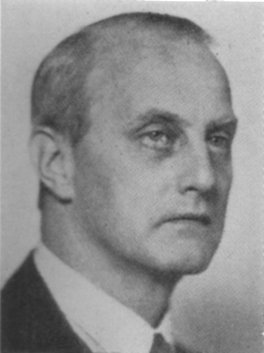
- Georg Branting

Member of the Riksdag
- In office 1932–1961

Personal details
- Born: 21 September 1887 Stockholm, Sweden
- Died: 6 July 1965 (aged 77) Stockholm, Sweden
- Resting place: Adolf Fredrik Cemetery
- Party: Swedish Social Democratic Party
- Parent(s): Hjalmar Branting; Anna Branting

Georg Branting (21 September 1887 – 6 July 1965) was a Swedish Social Democrat and Olympic fencer. He was the son of Hjalmar Branting and Anna Branting, and a member of the Riksdag 1932–1961.

In the Spanish Civil War, a Scandinavian battalion of the International Brigades was named after him, as a sign of thanks for his vehement support of the Spanish Republic. He wrote a book on the Finnish Civil War called "Rättvisan i Finland" (Justice in Finland) which was published in Swedish in 1924 and later translated into Finnish and published in Helsinki in 1925. He competed for Sweden in the sport of fencing at both the 1908 and 1912 Summer Olympics.
