= European lawyer =

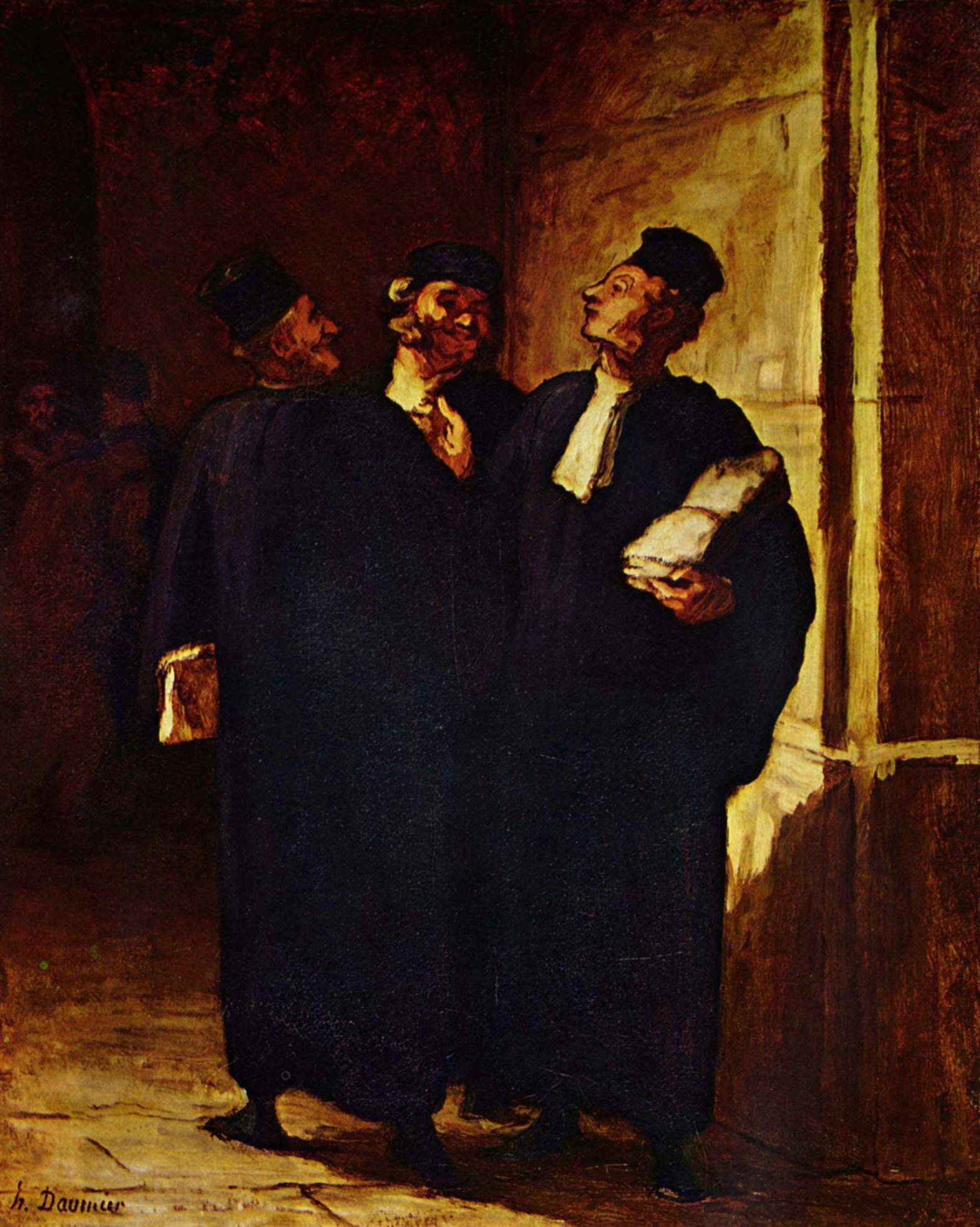
19th-century painting of lawyers, by French artist Honoré Daumier

A European lawyer, beyond the self-evident definition of 'a lawyer in Europe', also refers to a specific definition introduced by the UK's European Communities (Services of Lawyers) Order 1978, which permits lawyers from other EU member states to practice law within the UK, in accordance with EU directive 77/249/EEC.

The term EU lawyer is also used in UK law.

The order contains a list of countries of origin and the designations which the order applies to for example a professional "entitled to pursue his professional activities" such as an "advokat" in Finland, may practice Europe-wide as a "European lawyer".

The order also imposes temporary limitations on the types of legal work which may be carried out by such persons. Lawyers from other European countries practicing in the UK must be associated with appropriate co-counsel and upon demand by a competent authority they must verify their status.

After a possible temporary limitation such as the aforementioned, EU lawyers may acquire and use the title of the country they reside and work in, usually after three years of practice under the title of origin (and possible restrictions) or after an examination that confirms equivalence. The choice is up to the professional, not the bar or country.

== Professions Applicable to EU Order ==
The full list of professions to whom the title 'European Lawyer' is applicable follows;

Professions recognised under EU Order
Country	Profession	Duration of legal education
Austria	Rechtsanwalt	4-5 year degree + 5 years of training + exam
Belgium	Avocat	5 year degree + 3 years of training + exam
Belgium	Advocaat	5 year degree + 3 years of training + exam
Belgium	Rechtsanwalt	5 year degree + 3 years of training + exam
Bulgaria	Advokat	
Cyprus	Dikegόros	
Croatia	Odvjetnik	5 year degree + + 3 year legal traineeship + exam
Czech Republic	Advokát	5 year degree + 3 year legal traineeship + exam
Denmark	Advokat	5 year degree
Estonia	Vandeadvokaat	
Finland	Asianajaja	5-6 year degree
Finland	Advokat	5-6 year degree
France	Avocat	4 year degree + exam + lawyer school during 18 months + exam
Germany	Rechtsanwalt	5-6 year degree + exam + 2 year legal traineeship + exam
Greece	Dikegόros	4 year degree + 18 months legal traineeship + exam
Hungary	ügyvéd	5 year degree + 3 years of legal traineeship + exam
Iceland	lögmaður	
Ireland	Solicitor	Solicitor vs. Barrister distinction, university or practical experience paths
Ireland	Barrister	Solicitor vs. Barrister distinction, university or practical experience paths
Italy	Avvocato	5 year degree + 1.5 year legal traineeship + exam
Latvia	Zvērināts	
Latvia	Advokāts	
Liechtenstein	Rechtsanwalt	No law school; recognition of Austrian and Swiss law degrees.
Lithuania	Advokatas	
Luxembourg	Avocat	No local law school until recently; recognition of other EU law degrees and supplementary course in local law + final exam (avoué)
Luxembourg	Rechtsanwalt	No local law school until recently; recognition of other EU law degrees and supplementary course in local law + final exam (avoué)
Malta	Avukat	5 year degree + 1 year practice + exam
Malta	Prokuratur Legali	
Netherlands	Advocaat	4-5 year degree + 3 years training + exam
Norway	Advokat	
Poland	Adwokat	5 year degree + entry bar exam + 3 years of bar association training and mandatory professional work + bar exam
Poland	Radca Prawny	5 year degree + entry bar exam + 3 years of bar association training and mandatory professional work + bar exam
Portugal	Advogado	4 or 5 year degree + exam + bar association training and mandatory professional internship and exams (up to 2 years)
Romania	Avocat	
Slovakia	Advokát	Master's degree + 3-5 year apprenticeship + exam
Slovakia	Advokátka	Master's degree + 3-5 year apprenticeship + exam
Slovenia	Odvetnik	
Slovenia	Odvetnica	
Spain	Abogado	5 years and a half degree + exam
Spain	Advocat	5 years and a half degree + exam
Spain	Abokatu	5 years and a half degree + exam
Spain	Abogado	5 years and a half degree + exam
Sweden	Advokat	4-5 year degree
Switzerland	Rechtsanwalt	
Switzerland	Anwalt	
Switzerland	Fürsprecher	
Switzerland	Fürsprech	
Switzerland	Avocat	
Switzerland	Avvocato	
Switzerland	Advokat	
United Kingdom	Solicitor	England and Wales: 3 year degree + 0.5-1 year LPC + 2-year training contract Scotland: 3-4 year degree + 1 year Diploma + 2-year training contract
United Kingdom	Barrister (England and Wales) / Advocate (Scotland)	England and Wales: 3 year degree + 1 year BPTC + 1 year pupillage Scotland: 3-4 year degree + 1 year Diploma + experience in a solicitor's office + pupillage + exam

== See also ==
- Counsel
- List of European countries
