= Advokat =

Lawyers who practise in the Nordic countries

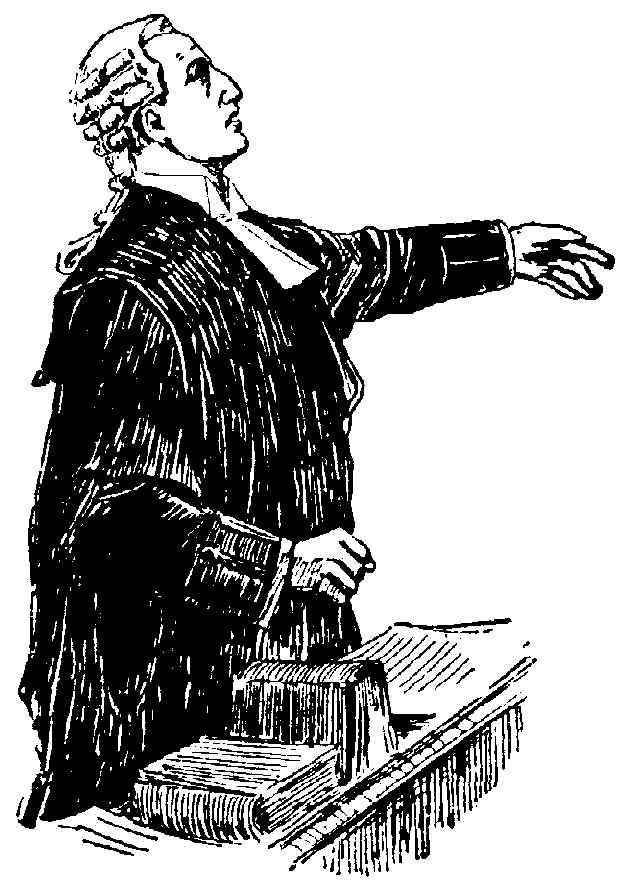

Advokat (in English, advocate) is the title in the Scandinavian languages reserved exclusively for lawyers who are duly authorized to practice law in the Nordic countries (i.e. Scandinavia, Finland, and Iceland), but also used in the Russian language, especially in the former Soviet Union.

== Usage by country ==
=== Denmark ===
Authorization to practice as advokat traditionally required the candidate to graduate from law school as Candidate of Law followed by three years of employment with a law firm or other eligible institution. In recent years, candidates have also been required to undergo training and to pass a bar examination administered by Advokatsamfundet, the Danish Bar and Law Society. To practice law as an advokat, the lawyer must maintain a current membership with the Danish Bar and Law Society, which supervises its approximately 4,800 members. Apart from paying annual dues to the association, an advokat must also adhere to its professional code of conduct, and may face disciplinary action as a consequence of conduct deemed unprofessional by Advokatnævnet, the Disciplinary Board. As a result of legal reform implemented in recent years, there is no longer a monopoly held by those bearing the title advokat on providing most legal services in Denmark.

=== Finland ===
Any lawyer applying for membership in the Finnish Bar Association must have completed a Master of Laws degree, entitling them to hold judicial office, and must be known to be a person of integrity. They also must have several years experience in the legal profession and other judicial duties. Only members of the bar association are entitled to use the Swedish language professional title advokat (fi. asianajaja). The Finnish Bar Association has about 1,570 members.

=== Norway ===
A candidate seeking permission to practice from the Supervisory Authority for Legal Services (no. Advokattilsynet) is required to graduate from law school as a Candidate of Law, must be a person of integrity, must be at least 20 years of age, and must have practiced as a lawyer-in-training ("advokatfullmektig") for two years. Furthermore, the candidate must have represented clients in at least three court cases, of which one must be a civil case of a certain length, and of which one may be replaced by an exam by a certified provider. Only those authorized by the Supervisory Council are entitled to use the professional title advokat in Norway. To a certain extent, there is a monopoly held by those bearing the title advokat on providing legal services in Norwegian courts of law.

=== Sweden ===
A candidate seeking admittance to the Swedish Bar Association is required to graduate from law school as a Candidate of Law entitling the candidate to hold judicial office, must be a person of integrity, and must have practiced for three years. A bar exam must also be passed. Only members of the bar association are entitled to use the professional title advokat in Sweden. The Swedish Bar Association has in excess of 4,400 members. In principle, there is no monopoly held by those bearing the title advokat on providing legal services in Sweden; a person may appoint almost anyone as ombud (representative) whether in civil, tort or criminal proceedings. However, if a defendant wishes to recoup expenses, the ombud typically needs to be an approved member of the SBA.
