= Women in Sweden =

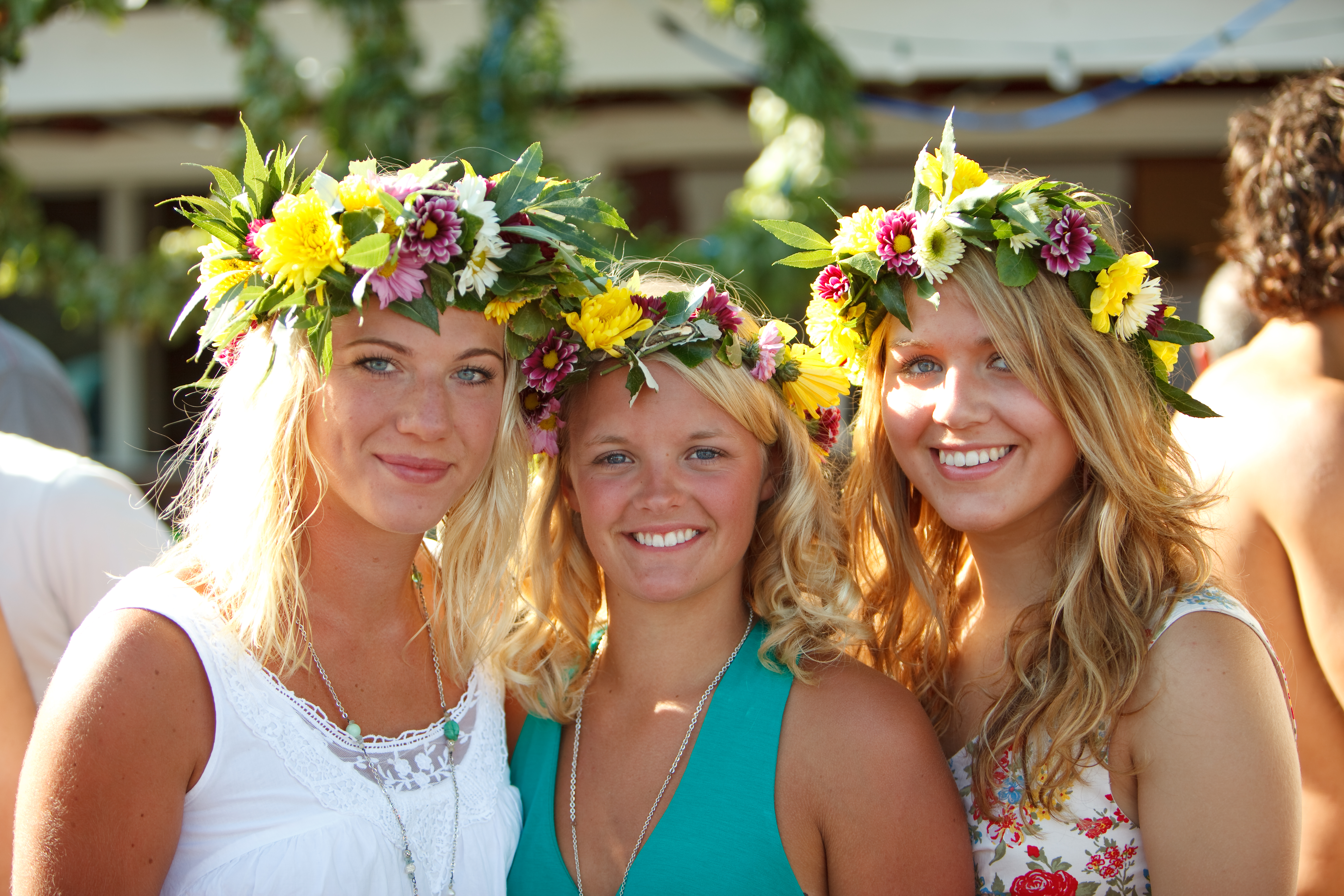
- Three Swedish women during the traditional Swedish celebration Midsummer

Gender Inequality Index
- Value: 0.023 (2021)
- Rank: 4th out of 191

Global Gender Gap Index
- Value: 0.822 (2022)
- Rank: 5th out of 146

The status and rights of Women in Sweden has changed several times throughout the history of Sweden. These changes have been affected by the culture, religion and laws of Sweden, as well as social discourses like the strong feminist movement.

== History of women in Sweden ==
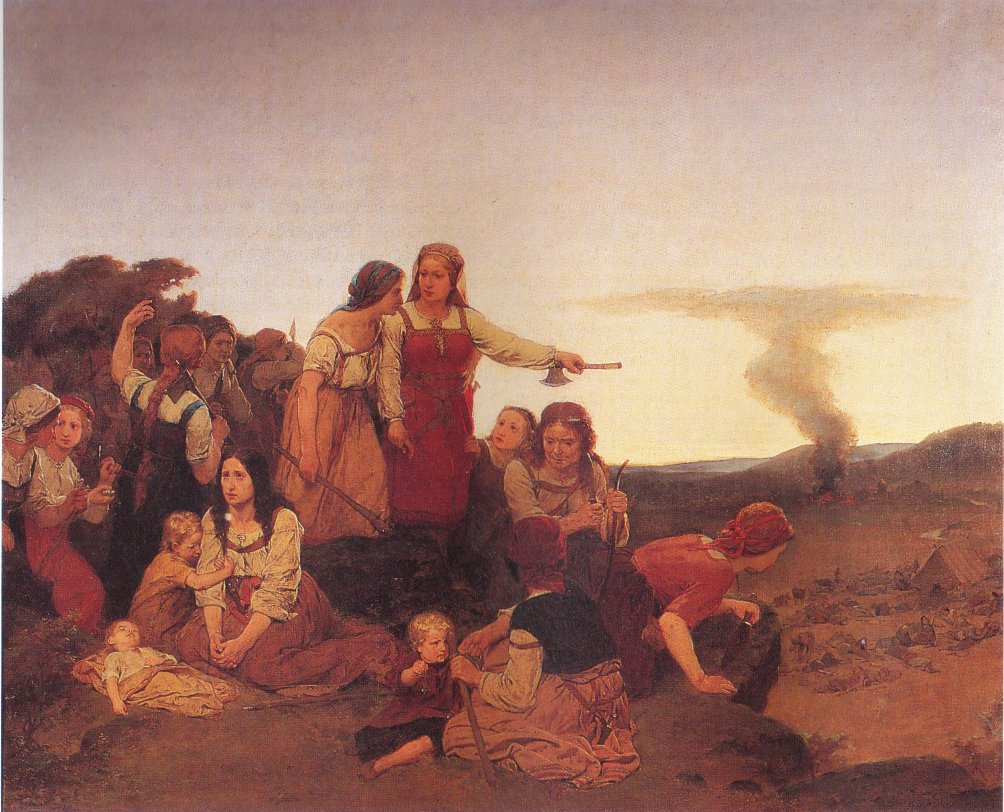
Blenda by August Malmström (1829–1901)

=== Viking age ===
During the Viking Age, women had a relatively free status in the Nordic countries of Sweden, Denmark and Norway, illustrated in the Icelandic Grágás and the Norwegian Frostating laws and Gulating laws. The paternal aunt, paternal niece and paternal granddaughter, referred to as odalkvinna, all had the right to inherit property from a deceased man. In the absence of male relatives, an unmarried woman with no son could furthermore inherit the position as head of the family from a deceased father or brother: a woman with such status was referred to as ringkvinna, and she exercised all the rights afforded to the head of a family clan, such as the right to demand and receive fines for the slaughter of a family member, until she married, by which her rights were transferred to her husband. After the age of 20, an unmarried woman, referred to as maer and mey, reached legal majority and had the right to decide of her place of residence and was regarded as her own person before the law. An exception to her independence was the right to choose a marriage partner, as marriages was normally arranged by the clan. Widows enjoyed the same independent status as unmarried women.

Women had religious authority and were active as priestesses (gydja) and oracles (sejdkvinna); they were active within art as poets (skalder) and rune masters, and as merchants and medicine women. They may also have been active within military office: the stories about shieldmaidens is unconfirmed, but some archaeological finds such as the Birka female Viking warrior may indicate that at least some women in military authority existed. A married woman could divorce and remarry. It was also socially acceptable for a free woman to cohabit with a man and have children with him without marrying him, even if that man was married: a woman in such a position was called frilla. There was no distinction made between children born inside or outside of marriage: both had the right to inherit property after their parents, and there was no "legitimate" or "illegitimate" children. These rights gradually disappeared from the local county laws after Christianization in the 11th century.

=== Middle Ages and early modern age ===
During the Middle Ages, the status and rights of women varied between different parts of the country, as the local county laws applied different laws in different counties. The first attempt of a national law was Magnus Erikssons landslag from 1350, which established one law for the country side, and one Stadslagen (City Law) for the city, a system which was kept by the Kristofers landslag from 1442. From 1350 onward, the civil status of women were generally the same in both the county law and the city law: an unmarried woman was under the coverture of her closest male relative, and a wife under the coverture of her husband, while a widow was of legal majority.

In 1608, the law texts of the Old Testament from the bible were introduced in the law by amendments, which at least formally significantly worsened women's status. There was, however, a gap between law and practice: despite the fact that unmarried women were legal minors and only widows had the right to represent themselves in court, unmarried women were still in practice allowed to give testimony, sue and represent themselves in court matters, to such a degree that a law reform granted them this right in 1686 to legalize what was already common procedure.

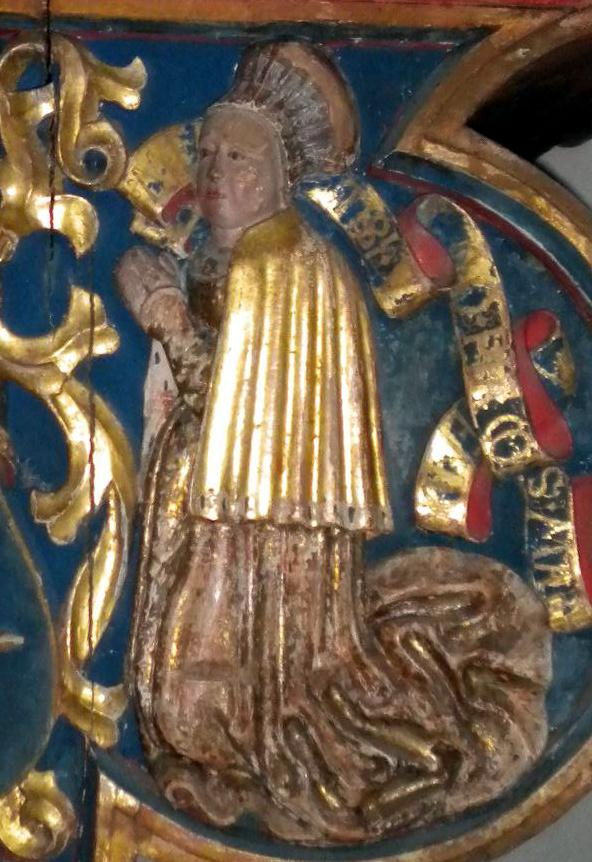
The national heroine Christina Gyllenstierna (1494–1559), 16th century sculpture by the altar of Västerås Cathedral.

==== County Law ====
From the Magnus Erikssons landslag of 1350 onward, daughters in the country side inherited half as much as sons. From 1686, the Swedish Church Law 1686 obliged every parish in the country side to provide elementary education to all children regardless of gender, usually provided by the vicar or a teacher employed by the vicarage.

In the countryside, professions were regulated by custom rather than laws. When unmarried, a woman from the peasantry would be expected by social custom to serve in the household of another peasant family as a piga (maid), which was regarded as a way to learn household experience and earn money for a dowry before marriage and was not socially seen as a servant position: when married, the wives of farmers, fishermen and miners all traditionally participated alongside their husbands in their professions, handled them alone in their absence and, if their husbands died without an adult son, in their own name as widows. At least since the 17th century and until the 19th century, women were known to labor as miners and blacksmiths, referred to as gruvpiga (Maid of the Mine).

The custom of a wife acting as the proxy of her husband afforded considerable independence to women especially during the 17th century, when the men were called to serve in numerous wars and their wives were left behind to manage the family affairs in their absence, which was the case both with the wives of common farmer-soldiers as well as with the wives of noblemen, who were left with the responsibility of vast estates and parishes and the task to act as channels to the crown for the estate dependents. In the local community, the wives of the parish vicars had a strong position as a sort of caretaker of the parish social welfare, a position maintained by the system of Widow Conservation until the 19th century.

==== City law ====
From the Magnus Erikssons landslag of 1350, the city law granted daughters and sons equal inheritance rights. In the Swedish Church Ordinance 1571, the city law encouraged parents to provide primary education to their children regardless of sex, and from the late 16th century onward, the city schools are confirmed to have accepted girls, though normally only in the first classes. Ursula Agricola from Strasbourg and Maria Jonae Palmgren from Grenna, however, were both accepted at Visingsö Gymnasium (school) in the 1640s.

From the 14th century until the Fabriks och Handtwerksordning and Handelsordningen of 1846, many professions in the cities were monopolized by the guilds. Women were, however, not excluded from guild membership. Widows became members with the license to practice the profession of their late spouse until remarriage: they could also be given a permit to practice some other trade. Formally, many guilds excluded married and unmarried women, however in practice there are numerous examples of married and unmarried female guild members. There were also exclusively female guilds, such as that of the midwives and that of the Rower woman. In 1460, 180 female guild members were listed for the city of Stockholm: the profession is not stated for the majority of them, but when it is, the most common professions for city women were brewer, baker, seamstress and washer woman, professions which continued to be common for city women in the following centuries.

There were also professions outside of the guilds, such as the profession of Mursmäcka. A woman regardless of personal status could purchase a permit, to be active within trade of export and import without guild membership and be a Kontingentborgare. The city also issued the permit of månglare. This was a permit to manufacture and, or, sell goods which was not included in the guild monopolies from stands in the square or in the street, often old clothes, ornaments, jam and cakes, and from 1623, such permits was issued only to those who could prove that they had no other way to support themselves. Such persons were normally women: either widows, or married women whose husbands was unable to support them.

=== Age of Enlightenment ===
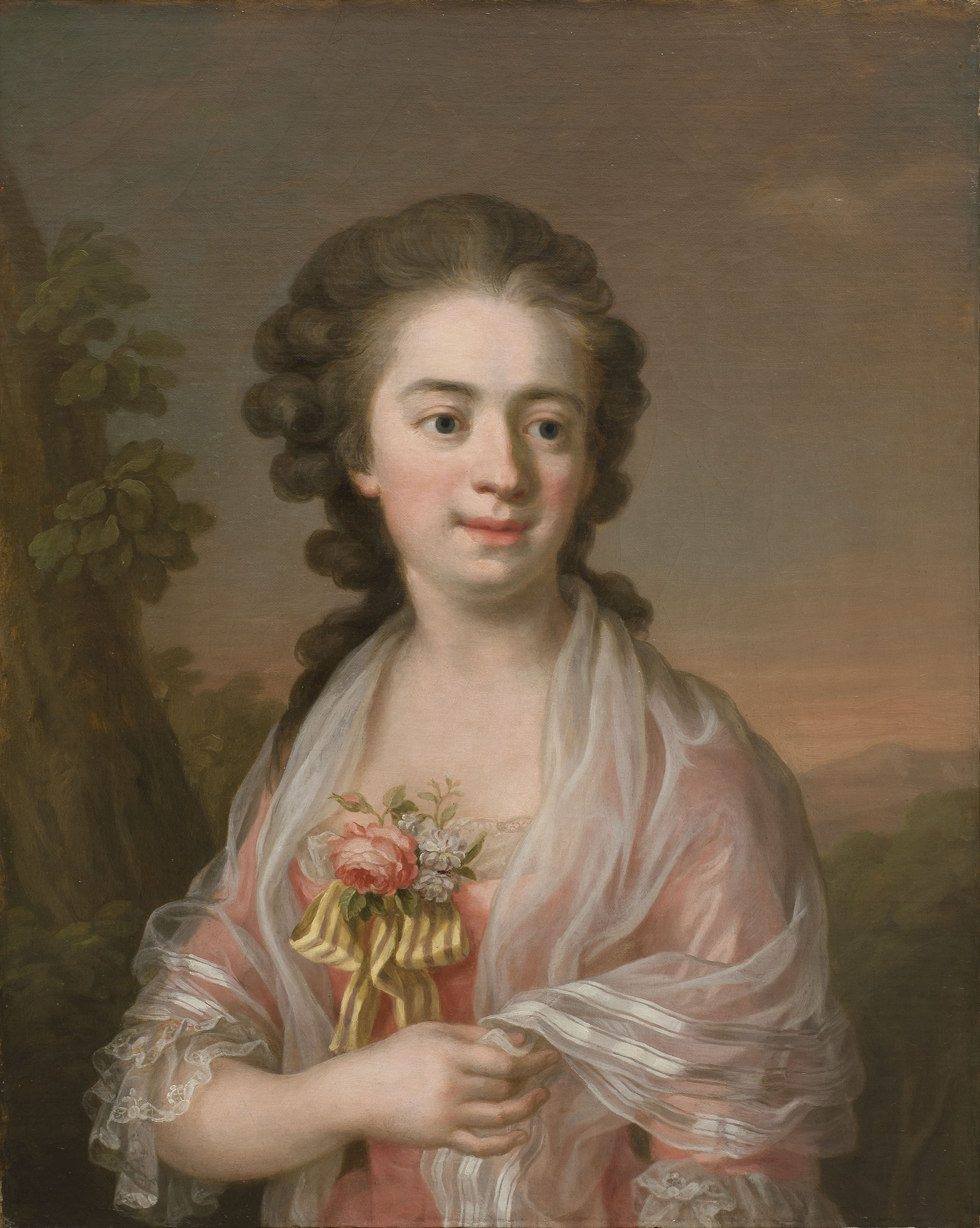
Ulrica Pasch.

The first law to apply the same rights to all women in the entire country by national law (including Finland, then a Swedish province), was the Civil Code of 1734, which, in the question of women's status, was in place more or less unaltered until the second half of the 19th century. In the Civil Code of 1734, all unmarried women were defined as legal minors regardless of age, and placed under the guardianship of their closest male relative (or mother, if the mother was widowed). She was given the right to contest her guardian in court and have another appointed by the court, and when adult, she had the right to make a will. Finally, an unmarried woman could be liberated from guardianship by a petition to the monarch. Upon the day of her marriage, she was placed under the coverture of her husband. However, men were banned from selling the property of their wives without their consent, wives were given the right to sell property and handle affairs in the absence of her husband, and both spouses regardless of gender were secured the right to divorce upon adultery, upon which the innocent party was secured custody of the children. When widowed (or divorced), a woman regardless of age reached legal majority.

The Guild Regulation of 1720 explicitly granted women permission to be active within the Guilds, and there were several amendments added to it which favored women's professional rights, most of them issued by local city authorities to make it possible for destitute women to support themselves, notably the reform of 1741 dropping guild membership requirement for innkeepers, and the reform of 1749, in which the permit to engage in street and market trade in Stockholm were to be issued in favor of poor women, reforms which made two very common professions more accessible to poor women.

In 1741, a reform abolished the public humiliation punishment of Uppenbar kyrkoplikt for unmarried mothers to prevent infanticide, and in 1778, the Infanticide Act (Sweden) was introduced: in order to spare unmarried mothers from the social stigma which was the common motive for them to kill their infants, mothers were allowed to travel to a place where they were unknown by the community and give birth anonymously, midwives were forbidden to expose their identity, and should they decide to keep their child, their unmarried status was to be hidden by the authorities to spare them social embarrassment.

The Age of Enlightenment in many ways offered a more public role for women in Sweden, especially within the artistic professions, and women were officially recognized: Eva Ekeblad was inducted in the Royal Swedish Academy of Sciences, Ulrika Pasch in the Royal Swedish Academy of Arts, and Elisabeth Olin in the Royal Swedish Academy of Music.

Numerous schools for girls were founded in the 18th century: in 1786, Societetsskolan, the first serious educational institution for females, was founded. An achievement to arouse attention was that of Aurora Liljenroth, who graduated from the gymnasium of Visingsö in 1788.

=== 19th century ===
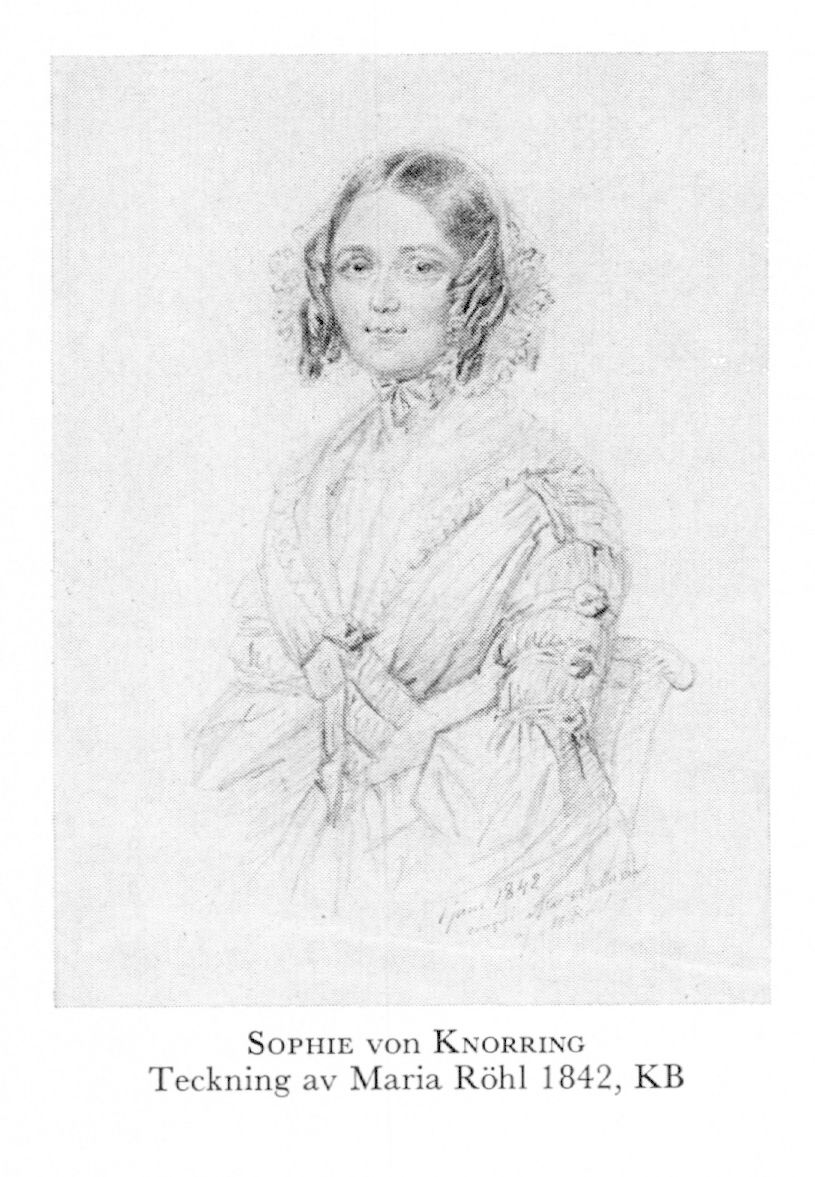
The popular writer Sophie von Knorring by Maria Röhl in 1842

In the first half of the 19th century, a population growth, in combination with changes in society caused by the economic crisis of the Napoleonic Wars and the industrialization, resulted in a growing number of unmarried women, for which the traditional role to support themselves by marriage was not available. Schools open to females normally offered a shallow education of accomplishments, focused on making their students ideal wives and mothers, and virtually the only profession open for an educated woman was that of a governess or a teacher in a private girls school.

By the 1840s, there was an ongoing debate as to how to provide women with an opportunity to support themselves as useful productive members of society should they fail to marry, without having to rely on the charity of relatives or resort to crime. The customary shallow education was harshly criticized, and in 1842, girls were included in the compulsory primary education school system. In parallel, under the pressure of the public debate, the old shallow private girl schools were gradually replaced by a new type of private secondary education schools for females, with the task to provide them with education useful for a professional life: in 1842, there were only five such schools in Sweden, but a rapid expansion from that point on resulted in the existence of such schools in most Swedish cities already in the 1870s.

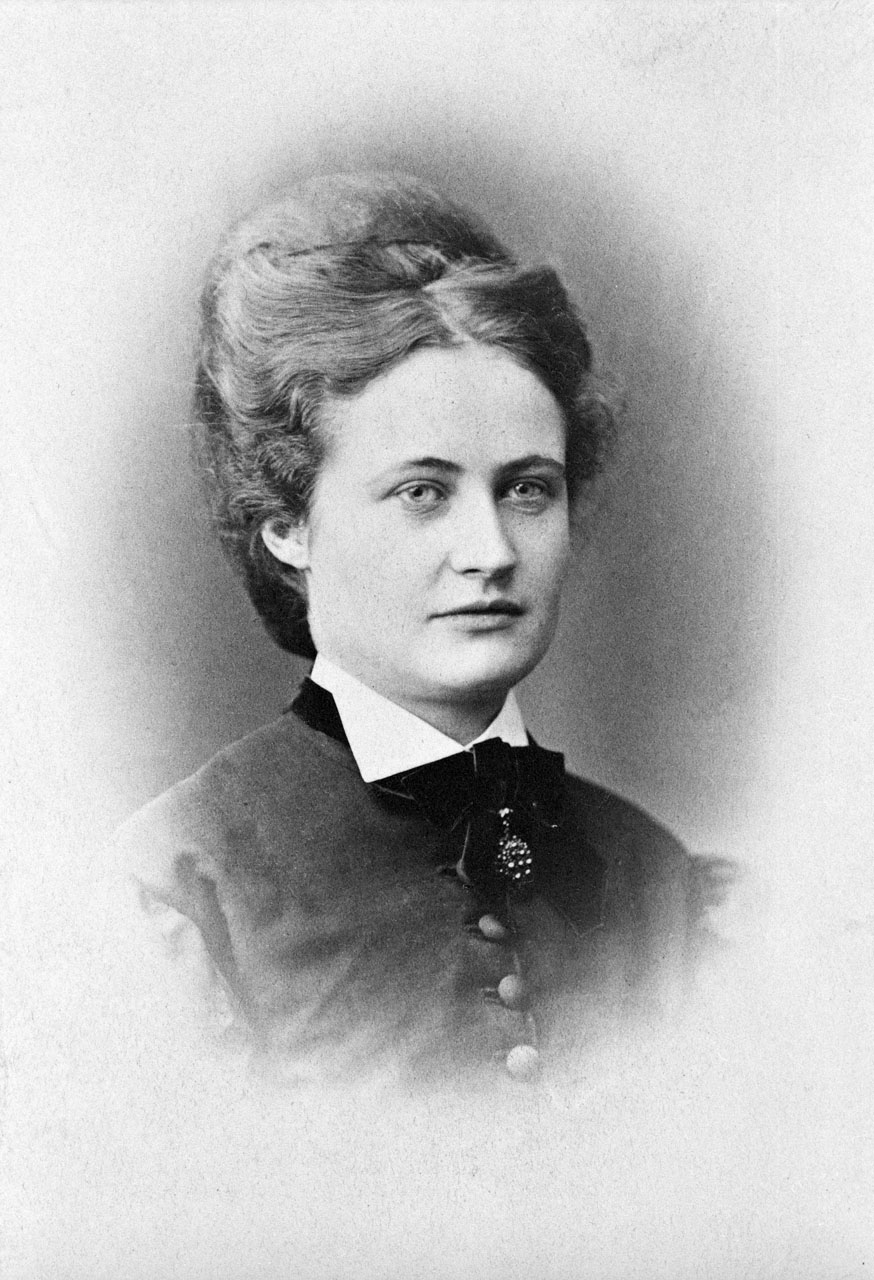
Anna Sandström, reform educator within women's education.

The argument of the reformists in parliament, that more professions should be open for women to make it possible for unmarried women to support themselves, caused a row of reforms in women's rights: equal inheritance rights in 1845; equal rights within trade and commerce (1846) and the professions of teacher in the public school system (1853), Feldsher, organist and dentist (1861) and positions at the telegraph- and postal offices (1863). Each of these reforms gave the reformists in parliament arguments for further reforms, arguing that it was the responsibility of the state, who had granted women these new rights, to provide them with the education and the juridical status necessary to handle them. As a consequence, in 1858–1863, unmarried women were granted legal majority, and after the recommendations made by the radical Girls' School Committee of 1866, the right for women to become a doctor and the right for women to attend university was finally introduced.

The 19th century signified the organization of women to participate in public life and social reform. From the foundation of the Välgörande fruntimmerssällskapet in 1819 women organized in civil charitable organizations such as the local Fruntimmers-skyddsförening, which became an acceptable way for a woman to play a public role and achieve social reform, and women became known public role models as social reformers, such as Emilie Petersen, Sophia Wilkens and Maria Cederschiöld (deaconess), which lay the foundation for women's participation in public life.

Women's organization, initially charitable, took a more radical form when the feminist movement was established. In 1848, Sophie Sager aroused controversy when reporting a rape attempt and winning the case in court, after which she became the first woman in Sweden to tour and make public speeches in favor of feminism. In 1855, women arguably organized for the first time to deal with an issue within women's rights, when Josefina Deland founded the Svenska lärarinnors pensionsförening (The Society for Retired Female Teachers) to provide for retired female teachers and governesses, and from 1856, the Tidskrift för hemmet became the first regular feminist spokes organ. During the second half of the century, the women's movement organized with the Married Woman's Property Rights Association (1873) and the Fredrika Bremer Association (1884), and started to make demands of their own.

From the 1880s, women such as Emilie Rathou, Elma Danielsson, Alina Jägerstedt and Kata Dahlström were engaged in the temperance movement, the working class movement, the trade unions and the political press and media. Women organized prominently in the Woman's Christian Temperance Union, whose Swedish section Vita bandet ("White ribbon") was founded in 1897.

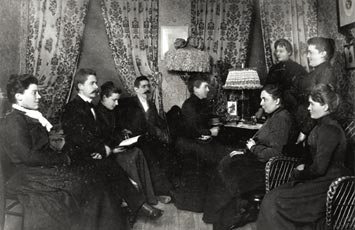
1902 meeting of the Committee for Women's Agitation, the precursor of the Women's Trade Union. The meeting was held at the Anna Sterky residence. Kata Dahlström is seen of the left.

Women also started to organize politically via the Swedish work- and union movement, where they were early inducted in to the movement and came to play an important role. In 1888 the first 'Women's Worker's Club' was founded in Malmö, which was followed by its Stockholm eqvivalent and a number of local women's workers club, which eventually united to form the Social Democratic Women in Sweden, and via the women's worker's club, women were in parallel included in the trade unions, uniting in the Women's Trade Union; and Alina Jägerstedt ensured that women were included as party members at the very foundation of the Swedish Social Democratic Party. The well organized Swedish working women came to play a vital part in the integration of women in the public political ad professional sphere, and there were more women active within the Social Democratic movement than any other policial party.

=== 20th century onwards ===
In 1902 the Swedish Society for Woman Suffrage was founded, supported by the Social Democratic women's Clubs to achieve the final reform in women's civil rights: women suffrage. Another important goal at this point was to make it possible for women to access the same professions as men on higher levels, which was denied them even when they had the necessary education. Women were for example able to be a university professor or a doctor in a hospital, but only in private institutions, as positions at such levels in state institutions had civil servant status, which was a fact which prevented women from using their education in equal competition with men. In 1909, an important step was made when the phrase "Swedish man" was removed from the application forms to public offices and civil servant occupations, which lifted a number of professional bars and gave women access to many professional opportunities which had until then been denied them even when they had the necessary education.

In 1919–1921, women's suffrage was finally introduced, which also necessitated a reform in which also married women were finally liberated from the guardianship of their spouses and granted legal majority in 1920. The women suffrage reform was followed by the Behörighetslagen ('Competence Law') of 1923, in which males and females were formally guaranteed equal access to all professions and positions in society, the only exceptions being military and priesthood positions. The last two restrictions were removed in 1958, when women were allowed to become priests, and in a series of reforms between 1980 and 1989, when all military professions were opened to women.

Between 1921 and 1971, the successor of the suffrage movement, the Svenska Kvinnors Medborgarförbund, worked to ensure that the formal laws of gender equality was enforced in practice and not remain on paper only. From 1921 to 1954, Kvinnliga medborgarskolan vid Fogelstad ('Fogelstad Citizen School for Women') held courses to educate women about their new rights as full and equal citizens and encouraged them to use their new rights.

During the interwar period, various women's magazines and organizations existed for women of all political views and classes. Women organized in the women's wings of the political parties, such as the Social Democratic Women in Sweden, Centerkvinnorna, Liberala kvinnor and the Moderate Women, through which they channeled their demands in to politics, entering the political life and voicing their interests in Parliament, and during the Interwar period both the Föreningen Kvinnolistan (Literary: 'The Women's List Association') of 1927 and the Kommittén för ökad kvinnorepresentation (Literary: 'The committee for increased women's representation') of 1937 lobbied the political parties to appoint more women to political office.

A 2023 study found that Sweden made considerable gains in closing the gender gap from 1940 onwards. Prior to 1940, gender inequality remained static.

In 2021, Statistics Sweden using polls found that while women and men were equally likely to vote, women were since the 1980s onwards increasingly voting for leftist parties and which represented an increase in polarisation of political views between men and women.

The campaign for increased political representation of women by Kommittén för ökad kvinnorepresentation in 1937-1948 was followed by the Samarbetskommittén för ökad kvinnorepresentation (Literary: 'The Cooperation Committee for increased women's representation') in 1968 and in 1991 by the campaign of the Stödstrumporna (Literary: 'The Support stockings'), resulting in almost half of the elected officials to the Parliament being women in the 1994 Swedish general election.

== Politics ==
=== Voting patterns and party sympathies ===
While women in Sweden received voting rights in 1921, it wasn't until the 1970s that women were voting as frequently as men. Since then, polarisation has been on the rise where men and women are increasingly voting for different parties. In the 1973 general election, gender differences in voting patterns were minor.

In Sweden, differences in party sympathies were minor until the 1980s, when women were increasingly voting for leftist parties, a trend which also happened in many comparable countries. This is due to women entering the labour market primarily in the public sector. In the 1990s, women increasingly voted for the socialist Left Party and the Green Party. According to a June 2018 poll by, the Green Party's vote among men (3%) which at less than 4% would have pushed the party out of parliament, while it enjoyed twice the support among women (6%). Political sympathies are polled in May and November each year by SCB. In November 2018, the largest gender difference was recorded for sympathisers of the Sweden Democrats which received support among 22.7% of men and 9.3% of women. Women consistently have a slightly higher proportion of respondents answering "no party/undecided". Statistics Sweden concluded that the statistical trend represented an increase in polarisation in political views between the genders while women and men were equally likely to vote.

=== Feminism and women's movement in Sweden ===
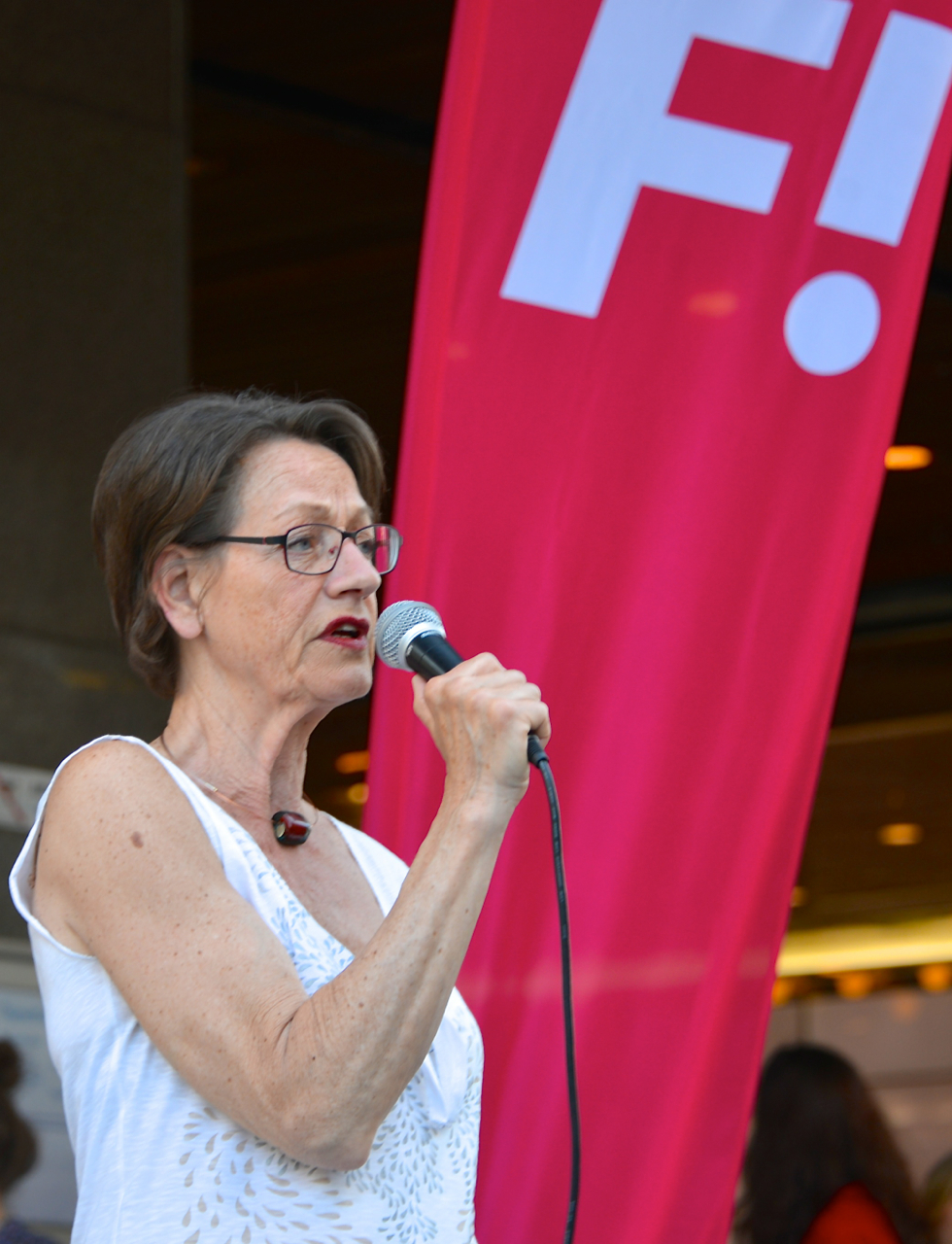
Gudrun Schyman speaks for Feminist Initiative (Sweden) (Fi), in Stockholm

Feminism in Sweden dates back to the 17th century and has been discussed in intellectual circles throughout the 18th century. Since Hedvig Charlotta Nordenflycht's famous poem Fruntimrens försvar (To the Defense of Women, 1761) debate on gender roles and gender equality has become a mainstream topic. Since then, Sweden has remained a forerunner of gender equality driven by a both intellectual and practical feminist movement.

Today, with its increasing multiculturalism, Swedish society has embraced third-wave feminism. Sweden's Feminist Initiative became the second feminist political party (after Miljöpartiet) to win a parliamentary mandate in the 2014 European elections, rediscussing feminism from a decisively antiracist perspective that includes the perspectives of people of color.

== Specific issues within gender equality ==
=== Law enforcement ===
In 1908, the first three women, Agda Hallin, Maria Andersson and Erica Ström, were employed in the Swedish Police Authority in Stockholm upon the request of the Swedish National Council of Women, who referred to the example of Germany. Their trial period was deemed successful and from 1910 onward, policewomen were employed in other Swedish cities. However, they did not have the same rights as their male colleagues: their title were Polissyster ('Police Sister'), and their tasks concerned women and children, such as taking care of children brought under custody, performing body searches on women, and other similar tasks which were considered unsuitable for male police officers.

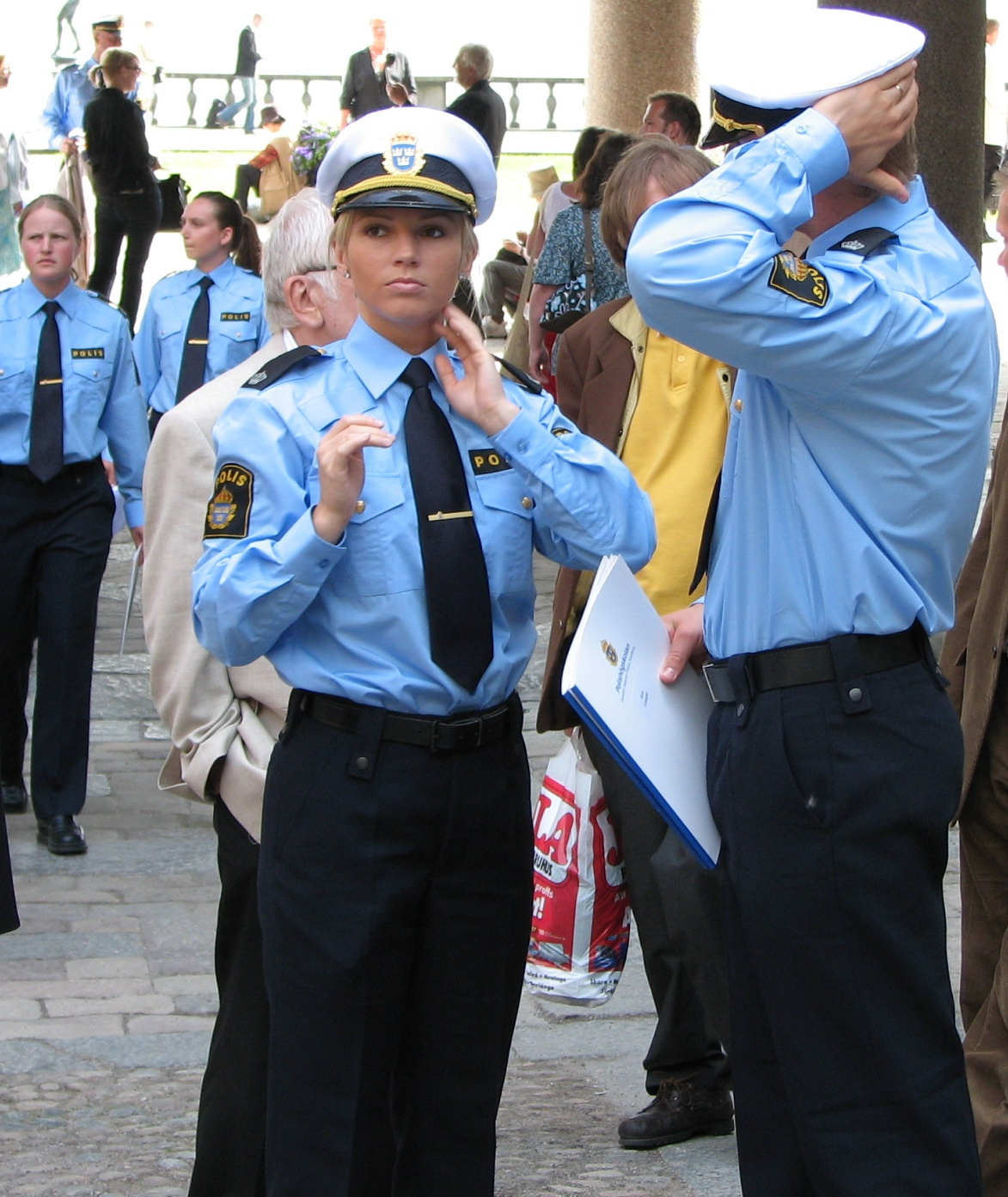
A Swedish policewoman with her male counterpart

The introduction of Competence Law in 1923, which formally guaranteed women all positions in society, was not applicable in the police force because of the two exceptions included in the law which excluded women from the office of priest in the state church - as well as from the military, which was interpreted to include all professions in which women could use the monopoly on violence.

In 1930, the Polissyster were given extended rights and were allowed to be present at houses searches in women's homes, conduct interrogations of females related to sexual crimes, and do patrol reconnaissance. In 1944, the first formal police course for women opened; in 1954, the title "police sister" was dropped and police officers could be both men and women. From 1957, women received equal police education to that of their male colleagues.

=== Military ===
In the Military Articles of 1621, which organized the Swedish army, military men on all levels were explicitly allowed to bring their wives with them to war, as the wives were regarded to fill an important role as sutlers in the house hold organisation of the army: prostitutes, however, were banned. This regulation was kept until the Military Article of 1798, though the presence of women diminished after the end of the Great Northern War. In the Military Article of 1798, the only women allowed to accompany the army was the professional unmarried female sutlers, in Sweden named marketenterska. Unofficially, however, there were females who served in the army posing as male the entire period, the most famous being Ulrika Eleonora Stålhammar.

In 1924, the Swedish Women's Voluntary Defence Organization ("Lottorna") was founded: it is an auxiliary defense organization of the Home Guard, a part of the Swedish Armed Forces.

Since 1989 there are no gender restrictions in the Swedish military on access to military training or positions. They are allowed to serve in all parts of the military and in all positions, including combat.

In 2010, Sweden abolished male-only conscription and replaced it with a gender-neutral system. Simultaneously, the conscription system was however deactivated, only to be reactivated in 2017. Hence, beginning in 2018 both women and men are obliged to do military service.

In 2018, female personnel made up 15% of the soldiers in training and less than 7% of the professional military officers.

=== Parliamentary appointments and elections ===
After the 1921 election, the first women were elected to Swedish Parliament after the suffrage: Kerstin Hesselgren in the Upper chamber and Nelly Thüring (Social Democrat), Agda Östlund (Social Democrat) Elisabeth Tamm (liberal) and Bertha Wellin (Conservative) in the Lower chamber. By 1961, women held more than 10% seats in parliament.

In 1947, Karin Kock-Lindberg became the first female government minister, and in 1958, Ulla Lindström became the first female acting Prime Minister. It was not until 1966 that there was more than one woman in the cabinet at the same time.

In the election of 1994, for the first time, women had more than 40% of the seats of parliament, and half of the cabinet positions in government. This made Sweden unique in the world at the time.

=== Rape law ===
In 1965, Sweden made marital rape illegal. In 2018, Sweden passed a law defining sex without consent in clear body language or words as rape, even if no force or threats are used; previously a rape conviction had required proof that the offender used force or that the victim was in a vulnerable state.

=== Sexuality and abortion ===
Sweden provides for sex education in schools. The age of consent in Sweden is 15. Contraception was legalized in 1938. Abortion was allowed on certain conditions by the Abortion Act of 1938. Free abortion was permitted through the Abortion Act of 1974.

=== Women's suffrage ===
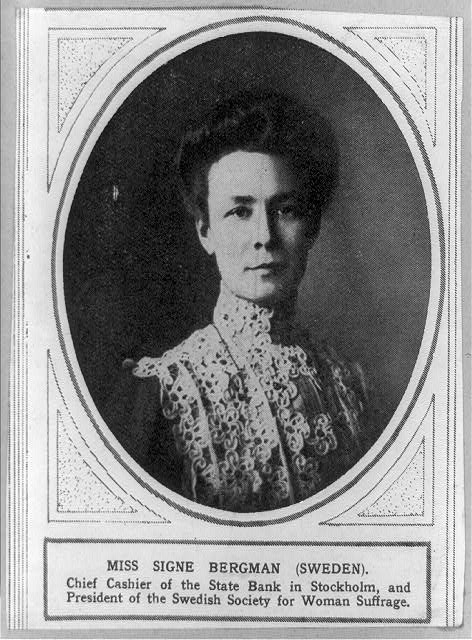
Swedish suffragist Signe Bergman, around 1910

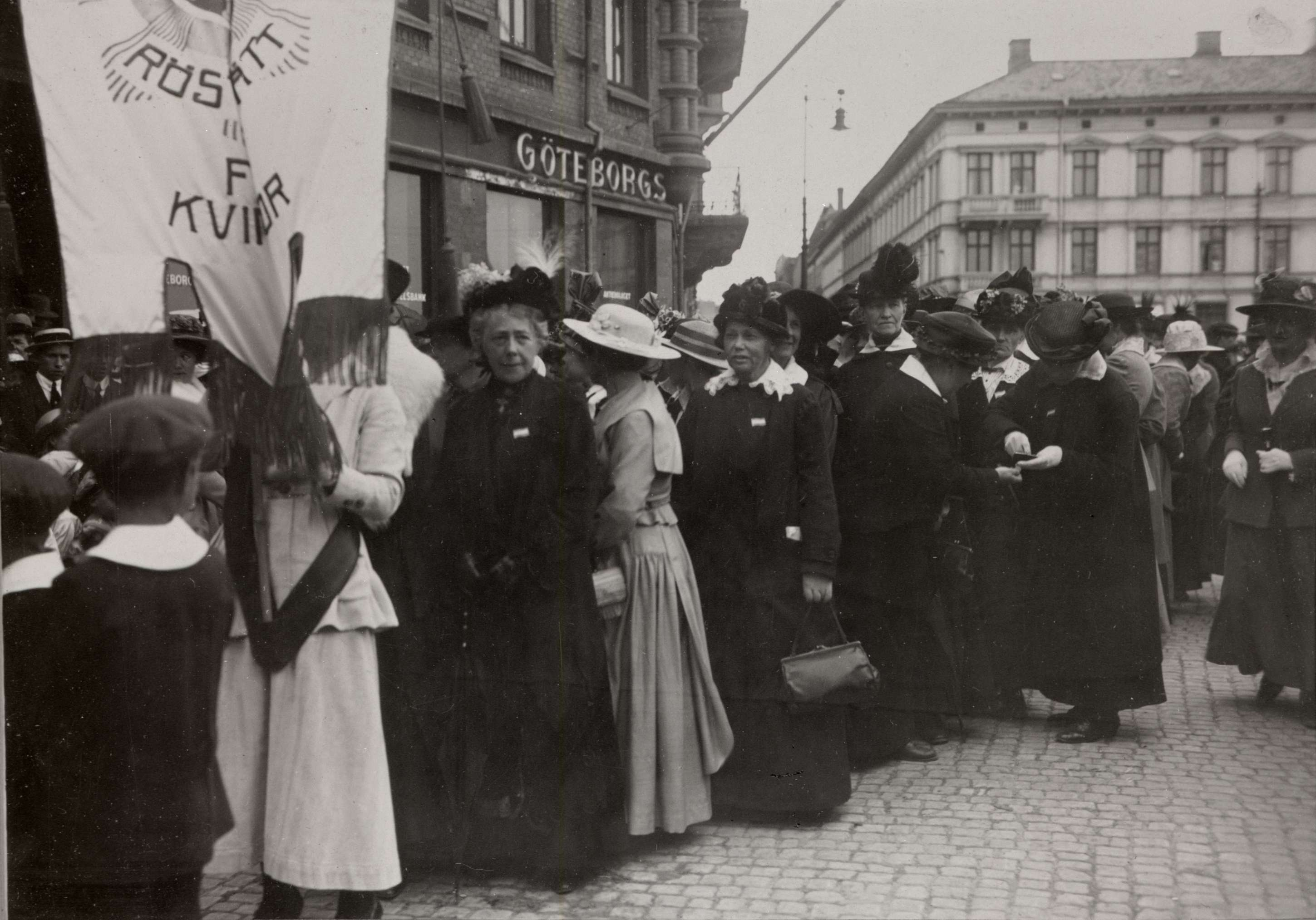
Women's suffrage demonstration in Gothenburg, June 1918.

During the Age of Liberty (1718–1772), Sweden had conditional women's suffrage. Until the reform of 1865, the local elections consisted of mayoral elections in the cities, and elections of parish vicars in the countryside parishes. The Sockenstämma was the local parish council who handled local affairs, in which the parish vicar presided and the local peasantry assembled and voted, an informally regulated process in which women were reported to have participated already in the 17th century. The national elections consisted of the election of the representations to the Riksdag of the Estates.

Suffrage was gender neutral and therefore applied to women as well as men if they filled the qualifications of a voting citizen. These qualifications were changed during the course of the 18th century, as well as the local interpretation of the credentials, affecting the number of qualified voters: the qualifications also differed between cities and countryside, as well as local or national elections.

Initially, the right to vote in local city elections (mayoral elections) was granted to every burgher, which was defined as a taxpaying citizen with a guild membership. Women as well as men were members of guilds, which resulted in women's suffrage for a limited number of women. In 1734, suffrage in both national and local elections, in cities as well as countryside, was granted to every property owning taxpaying citizen of legal majority. This extended suffrage to all taxpaying property owning women whether guild members or not, but excluded married women and the majority of unmarried women, as married women were defined as legal minors, and unmarried women were minors unless they applied for legal majority by royal dispensation, while widowed and divorced women were of legal majority. The 1734 reform increased the participation of women in elections from 55 to 71 percent.

Between 1726 and 1742, women voted in 17 of 31 examined mayoral elections. Reportedly, some women voters in mayoral elections preferred to appoint a male to vote for them by proxy in the city hall because they found it embarrassing to do so in person, which was cited as a reason to abolish women suffrage by its opponents. The custom to appoint to vote by proxy was however used also by males, and it was in fact common for men, who were absent or ill during elections, to appoint their wives to vote for them. In 1758, women were excluded from mayoral elections by a new regulation by which they could no longer be defined as burghers, but women's suffrage was kept in the national elections as well as the countryside parish elections. Women participated in all of the eleven national elections held up until 1757. In 1772, women's suffrage in national elections was abolished at the request of the burgher estate. Women's suffrage was first abolished for taxpaying unmarried women of legal majority, and then for widows. However, the local interpretation of the prohibition of women suffrage varied, and some cities continued to allow women to vote: in Kalmar, Växjö, Västervik, Simrishamn, Ystad, Åmål, Karlstad, Bergslagen, Dalarna and Norrland, women were allowed to continue to vote despite the 1772 ban, while in Lund, Uppsala, Skara, Åbo, Gothenburg and Marstrand, women were strictly barred from the vote after 1772.

While women suffrage was banned in the mayoral elections in 1758 and in the national elections in 1772, no such bar was ever introduced in the local elections in the countryside, where women continued to vote in the local parish elections of vicars. In a series of reforms in 1813–1817, unmarried women of legal majority, or an "Unmarried maiden, who has been declared of legal majority", were given the right to vote in the sockestämma (local parish council, the predecessor of the communal and city councils), and the kyrkoråd (local church councils).

In 1823, a suggestion was raised by the mayor of Strängnäs to reintroduce women's suffrage for taxpaying women of legal majority (unmarried, divorced and widowed women) in the mayoral elections, and this right was reintroduced in 1858.

In 1862, tax-paying women of legal majority (unmarried, divorced and widowed women) were again allowed to vote in municipal elections. This was after the introduction of a new political system, in which a new local authority was introduced: the communal municipal council. The right to vote in municipal elections applied only to people of legal majority, which excluded married women, as they were juridically under the guardianship of their husbands. In 1884, the suggestion to grant women the right to vote in national elections was initially voted down in Parliament. During the 1880s, the Married Woman's Property Rights Association had a campaign to encourage female voters who were qualified to vote in accordance with the 1862 law to use their vote and increase the participation of women voters in the elections, but there was still no public demand for women's suffrage among women. In 1888, the temperance activist Emilie Rathou became the first woman in Sweden to demand the right for women's suffrage in a public speech. In 1899, a delegation from the Fredrika-Bremer-Förbundet presented a suggestion of women's suffrage to prime minister Erik Gustaf Boström. The delegation was headed by Agda Montelius, accompanied by Gertrud Adelborg, who had written the demand. This was the first time the Swedish women's movement itself had officially presented a demand for suffrage.

In 1902 the Swedish Society for Woman Suffrage was founded, supported by the Social Democratic women's Clubs. In 1906, the suggestion of women's suffrage was again voted down in parliament. In 1909, the right to vote in municipal elections were extended to include married women as well. The same year, women were granted eligibility to serve in municipal councils, and in the following 1910–11 municipal elections, forty women were elected to different municipal councils, Gertrud Månsson being the first. In 1914, Emilia Broomé became the first woman in the legislative assembly.

The right to vote in national elections was not returned to women until 1919, and was practised again in the election of 1921, for the first time in 150 years.

After the 1921 election, the first women were elected to Swedish Parliament after the suffrage: Kerstin Hesselgren in the Upper Chamber and Nelly Thüring (Social Democrat), Agda Östlund (Social Democrat) Elisabeth Tamm (liberal) and Bertha Wellin (Conservative) in the Lower Chamber. Karin Kock-Lindberg became the first female government minister, and in 1958, Ulla Lindström became the first acting Prime Minister.

== Women pioneers ==
The names are placed in chronological order:

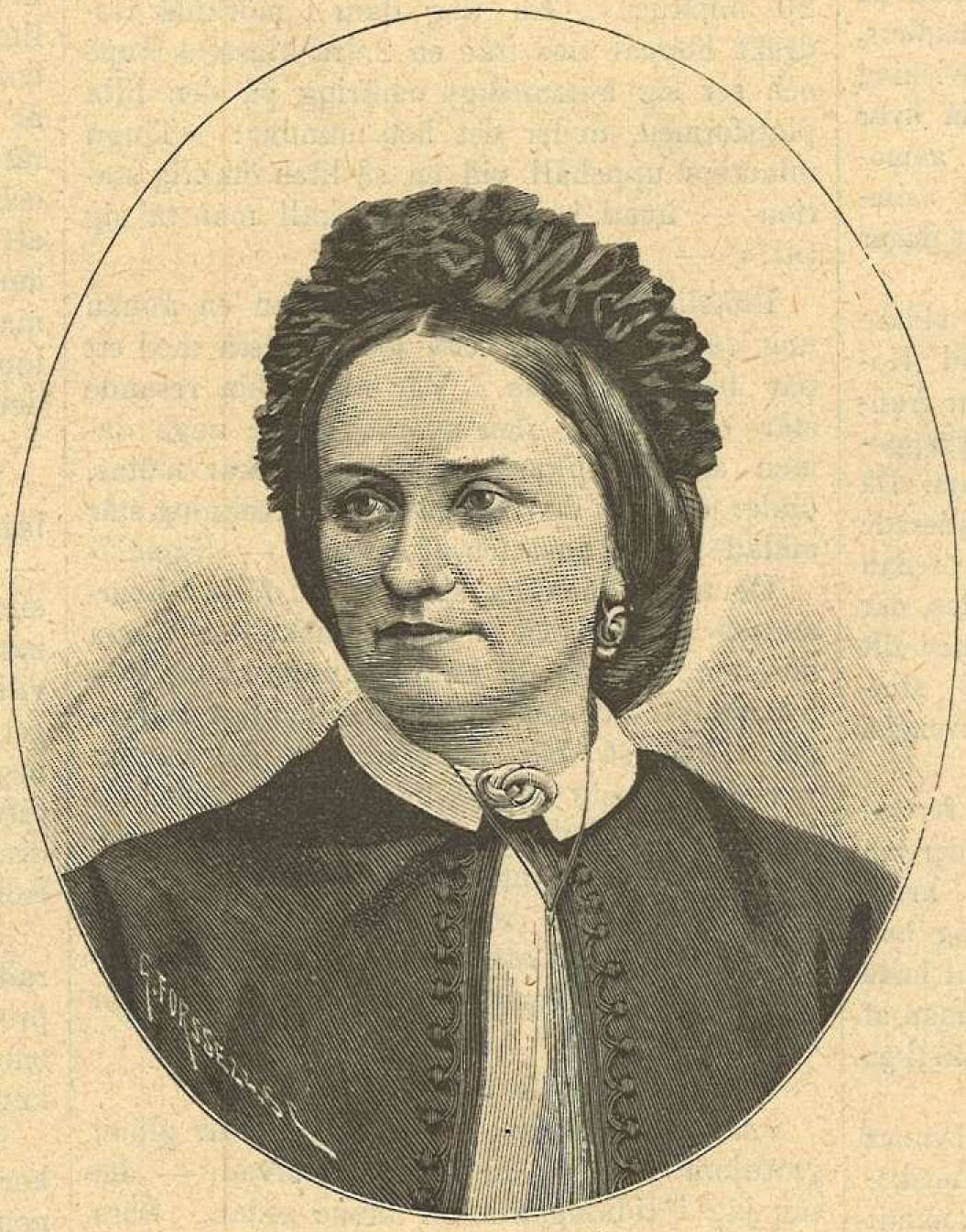
Nancy Edberg.

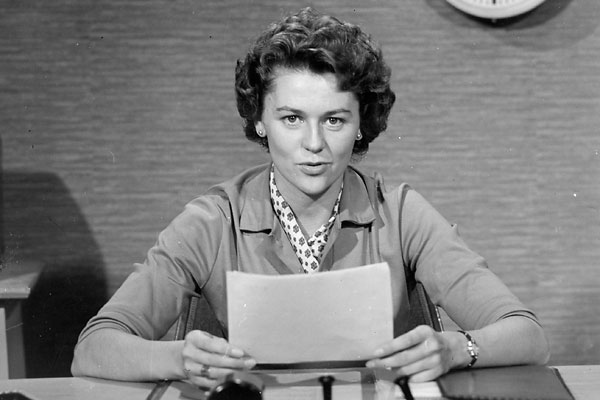
Gun Hägglund.

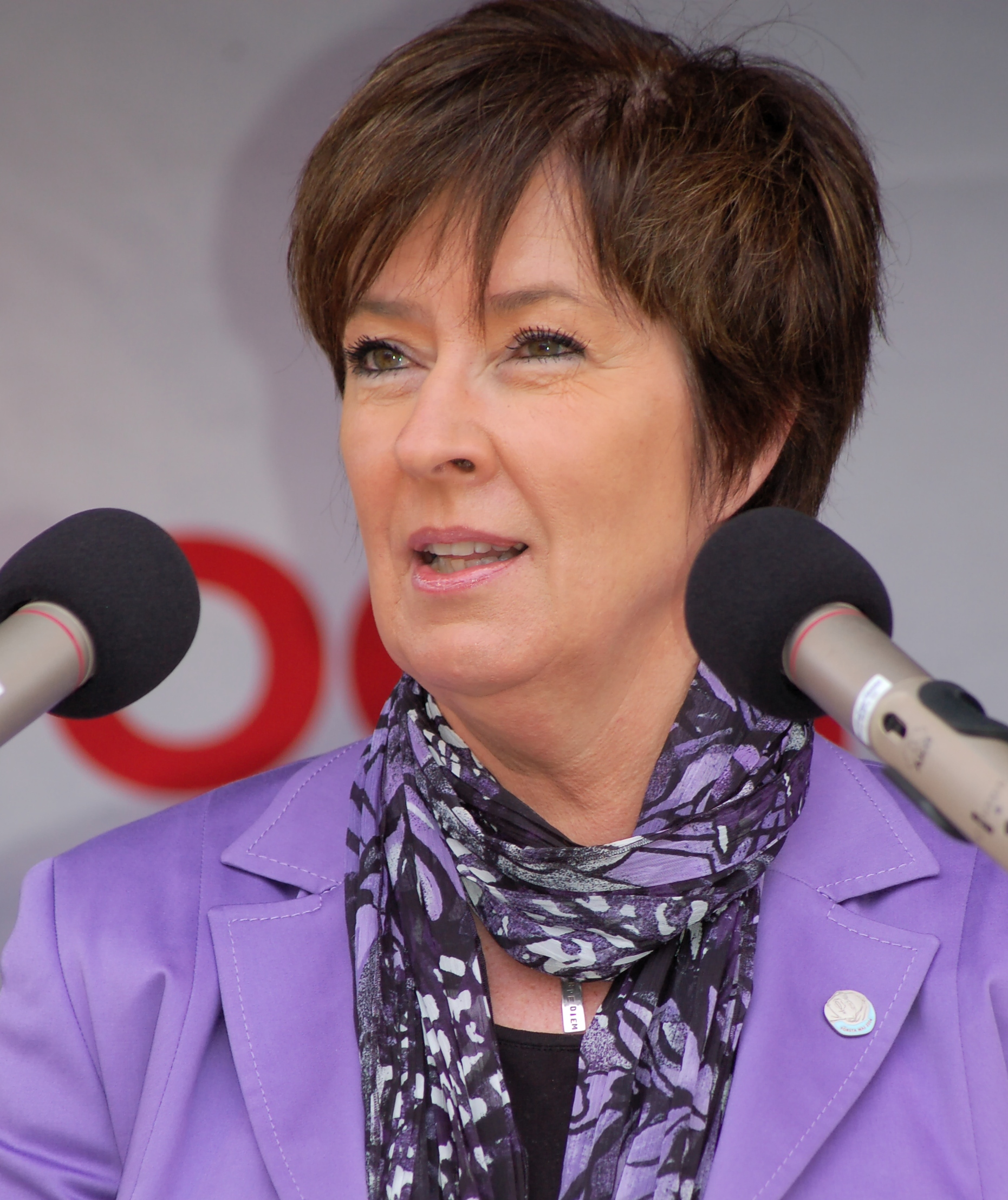
Mona Sahlin.

=== Academics ===
- First female university student: Betty Pettersson, 1872
- First female to obtain an Academic degree: Hildegard Björck, 1873
- First female Ph.D.: Ellen Fries, promoted in 1883
- First female medical doctor: Karolina Widerström, 1884
- First female professor: Sofia Kovalevskaya, 1889
- First female member of a Board of education: Lilly Engström, 1890
- First female Doctor of Law and docent: Elsa Eschelsson, 1897

=== Politics ===
- First female Governor (häradshövding) – Sigrid Sture, 1577
- First female Ambassador (to Russia): Catharina Stopia, 1632
- First female member of a government committee: Sophie Adlersparre and Hilda Caselli, 1885
- First female member of the Executive Committee of a Political Party – Kata Dalström, 1900
- First female Chairperson of a trade union – Anna Sterky, 1902
- First female Member of a City Council – 37 women, among them Gertrud Månsson and Hanna Lindberg, 1910
- First female Member of the legislative assembly – Emilia Broomé, 1914
- First female Member of the Riksdag (lower house) – Elisabeth Tamm, Agda Östlund, Nelly Thüring and Bertha Wellin – 1921
- First female Member of the Riksdag (upper house) – Kerstin Hesselgren, 1921
- First female minister of cabinet: Karin Kock (s), 1947
- First female Acting Prime Minister – Ulla Lindström, 1958
- First female Supreme Court Justice – Ingrid Gärde Widemar, 1968
- First female leader of a Riksdag party: Karin Söder (c), 1985
- First female Speaker of the Riksdag – Ingegerd Troedsson, 1991
- First female Deputy Prime Minister – Mona Sahlin, 1994
- First female Mayor of Stockholm – Annika Billström, 2002
- First female Prime Minister – Magdalena Andersson, 2021

=== Professions ===
- First female director of the Swedish Post Office: Gese Wechel, 1637
- First female Vogt: Karin Thomasdotter (1610–1697)
- First professional native actress: Beata Sabina Straas, 1737
- First female Mining Vogt: Maria Olsdotter, 1817
- First female physical education gymnast: Gustafva Lindskog, 1818
- First professional woman photographer: Brita Sofia Hesselius, 1845
- First professional woman swimmer Nancy Edberg, 1847
- First female dentist: Amalia Assur, 1852
- First female surgeon (feldsher): Johanna Hedén, 1863
- First female office clerk: Peggy Hård, 1860s
- First female telegraphist and telegraph station manager:Anna Lagerberg, 1864
- First (trained) nurse: Emmy Rappe, 1867
- First female chemist (with a degree): Louise Hammarström, 1875
- First female civil servant: Lilly Engström, 1890
- First female lawyer: Anna Pettersson, 1901
- First female psychiatrist: Alfhild Tamm, 1908
- First female film producer: Ebba Lindkvist, 1910
- First female architect (with a degree): Anna Branzell, 1919
- First female aviator: Elsa Andersson, 1920
- First female Judge: Birgit Spångberg, 1926
- First female television news reader: Gun Hägglund, 1958
- First female priest in the Swedish Church of State: Elisabeth Djurle, Margit Sahlin and Ingrid Persson, 1960
- First female Chief constable: Karin Värmefjord, 1981
- First female President of the Svea Court of Appeal: Birgitta Blom, 1983

== Timeline of women's rights in Sweden ==
1718

- Female taxpaying members of the cities' guilds are allowed to vote and stand for election during the Age of Liberty; this right is banned (for local elections) in 1758 and (general elections) in 1771

1734

- In the Civil Code of 1734, men are banned from selling the property of their wife without her consent, and both spouses regardless of gender are secured the right to divorce upon adultery, while the innocent party are secured custody of the children.
- Unmarried women, normally under the guardianship of their closest male relative, are granted the right to be declared of legal majority by dispensation from the monarch.

1741

- The requirement of guild membership for innkeepers is dropped, effectively opening the profession to women.

1749

- Women are given the right to engage in the trade of knick-knacks, and the permit to be active as a street seller (Månglare) in Stockholm, a very common profession for poor women, are to be foremost issued in favor of women in need of self-support.

1772

- The permit to engage in Tobacco trade is foremost to be granted to (widowed and married) women in need to support themselves.

1778

- Barnamordsplakatet; unmarried women are allowed to leave their hometown to give birth anonymously and have the birth registered anonymously, to refrain from answering any questions about the birth and, if they choose to keep their child, to have their unmarried status not mentioned in official documents to avoid social embarrassment.

1798

- Married businesswomen are given legal majority and juridical responsibility within the affairs of their business enterprise, despite being otherwise under guardianship of their spouse.

1804

- Sweden: Women are granted the permit to manufacture and sell candles.

1810

- The right of an unmarried woman to be declared of legal majority by royal dispensation are officially confirmed by parliament
- Married businesswomen are granted the right to make decisions about their own affairs without their husband's consent

1829

- Midwives are allowed to use surgical instruments, which are unique in Europe at the time and gives them surgical status

1842

- Compulsory Elementary school for both sexes

1845

- Equal inheritance for sons and daughters (in the absence of a will)

1846

- Trade- and crafts works professions are opened to all unmarried women

1853

- The profession of teacher at public primary and elementary schools are opened to both sexes

1858

- Legal majority for unmarried women (if applied for: automatic legal majority in 1863).

1859

- The post of college teacher and lower official at public institutions are open to women

1861

- The first public institution of higher academic learning for women, Högre lärarinneseminariet, is opened.
- The dentist profession is opened to women

1863

- The Post- and telegraph professions are opened to women

1864

- Unmarried women are granted the same rights within trade and commerce as men.
- Husbands are forbidden to abuse their wives.
- The gymnastics profession is open to women.

1869

- Women allowed to work in the railway office.

1870

- Universities open to women (at the same terms as men 1873). The first female student is Betty Pettersson.

1872

- Women are granted unlimited right to choose marriage partner without the need of any permission from her family, and arranged marriages are thereby banned (women of the nobility, however, are not granted the same right until 1882).

1874

- Married women granted control over their own income.

1889

- Women eligible to boards of public authority such as public school boards, public hospital boards, inspectors, poor care boards and similar positions

1900

- Maternity leave for female industrial workers

1901

- Women are given four weeks maternity leave.

1902

- Public medical offices open to women

1906

- Municipal suffrage, since 1862 granted to unmarried women, granted to married women

1908

- First women are employed in the Swedish Police Authority.

1909

- Women granted eligibility to municipal councils
- The phrase "Swedish man" are removed from the application forms to public offices and women are thereby approved as applicants to most public professions and posts as civil servants.

1920

- Legal majority for married women and equal marriage rights

1921

- Universal suffrage was introduced.

1923

- The Act of Eligibility formally grants women the right to all professions and positions in society, except for certain priest- and military positions.

1938

- Contraception legalized.

1939

- Ban against firing a woman for marrying or having children.

1947

- Equal salary for both sexes.

1948

- Maternity pay.

1958

- Women allowed to become priests.

1980

- Sweden signed the Convention on the Elimination of All Forms of Discrimination against Women in 1980, and ratified it later in 1980.

1989

- All military branches and position, including combat positions, available for women.

2018

- Sex without consent in clear body language or words was criminalized.

== See also ==
- List of Swedes
- Women in Europe
