= Branzell =

Branzell is a surname. Notable people with the surname include:

- Anna Branzell (1895–1983), Norwegian-born Swedish architect
- Karin Branzell (1891–1974), Swedish operatic contralto
- Sten Branzell (1893–1959), Swedish architect
