= Gabriel Tammelin =

Gabriel Tammelin (Gabriel Laurentii, Tammelensis, Tammelinus, February 24, 1641 – August 2, 1698) was vicar of Lohja, and a collector and translator of Finnish proverbs.

== Biography ==
Tammelin was born in Loimaa, the son of Laurentius Petri Aboicus, vicar of Tammela, and his second wife, Brita Larsdotter. He matriculated at the Royal Academy of Turku in 1658 and graduated with a Master of Arts degree in 1664. Tammelin became assistant rector of Turku Cathedral School in 1667 and rector in 1670. He was elected as Vicar of Lohja in 1675. So he took office in 1677. He became rural dean in 1693. Tammelin was also a member of the Estate of the Clergy in the Riksdag of 1686.

Tammelin's first published work in Finnish was Christillinen muisto-kirja, a translation of the Christliches Gedenkbüchlein by Johann Jacob Schütz. He produced this at the suggestion of Johannes Gezelius the younger, who had already translated it into Swedish. Tammelin next translated Johann Gerhard's Meditationes sacrae (in Finnish, Pyhät tutkistelemuxet) in 1680 - this would reach 15 editions by 1909.

Tammelin's father had assembled a collection of Finnish proverbs, which he called Liber Proverbiorum Fennicorum, although he did not publish it. Gabriel Tammelin added to this collection, which was eventually published, with further additions, by Henrik Florinus as Wanhain suomalaisten tawaliset ja suloiset sananlascut (Customary and Beautiful Proverbs of the Old Finns) in 1702.

Tammelin married Anna Eriksdotter Pihlin in 1663. Their sons were Lars Tammelin, bishop of Turku, and Henrik Tammelin, mayor of Helsinki. He died, aged 57, in Lohja.

== Sources ==
- Hautala, Jouko (1954). Suomalainen kansanrunoudentutkimus (in Finnish). Helsinki: Suomalaisen Kirjallisuuden Seura.
- Laine, Tuija (2007). "Tammelinus, Gabriel". Suomen kansallisbiografia 9 (in Finnish). Helsinki: SKS.
- Ylioppilasmatrikkeli 1640-1852
