= Olga Herlin =

Swedish engraver

Olga Gustava Herlin
- Born: 3 February 1875; Stockholm, Sweden
- Died: 24 April 1965 (aged 90); Stockholm, Sweden
- Occupation: Engraver
- Known for: First Swedish female engraver

Olga Gustava Herlin (3 February 1875 in Stockholm – 24 April 1965 in Stockholm) was Sweden's first female engraver. She introduced new working methods and served for nearly 50 years at the Swedish Kingdom's general mapping service and its predecessors. She was the first woman to be elected to the Swedish Cartographic Society in 1920.

== Biography ==
Olga Herlin was the oldest of seven children born to the map engraver and engineer Claes Ewald Reinhold Herlin and his wife Claudia, née Sjöberg.

As a fourteen-year-old, she accompanied her father to his office on Sundays at the topographic department of the General Staff, where he taught her terrain theory and topography as well as how to represent different terrain contours in her maps. Then he demonstrated map production using copper engraving.

Beginning in June 1889, Herlin carried out engraving work at home. The first year she engraved marsh and forest on the Kebnekaise and Kaalasluspa map sheets. When she finished school as a fifteen-year-old, she was able to start working more regularly and gradually also performed proofreading and retouching. By 1902, she had engraved all or parts of about 50 maps.

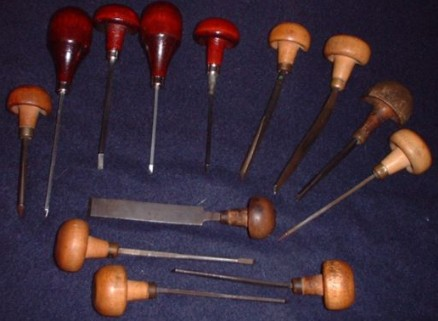
A collection of tools for engraving.

=== Innovation ===
Herlin discovered a way to improve the techniques used to transfer a drawn map to a copper plate. Until that time, the transfer was traditionally done by pantographing the map onto a colored paper, which was then chalked onto a gelatin paper. Herlin was able to streamline this process in 1901 in such a way that the map was directly pantographed onto the gelatin paper, from which the image was printed on the copper plate. This reduced opportunities for errors and cut working time in half.

In 1903, Herlin was paid as an extra engraver at the Kingdom's general cartography with a daily working time of 5 hours, but she did not get annual leave until 1908.

=== European trip ===
In 1906, the King granted Maj. Olga Herlin SEK 500 in scholarship from an Arbetarna travel grant. The purpose was further education in the art of copper engraving and to gain closer knowledge of heliogravure retouching and the execution of engravings for different color prints. Between June and September, she visited the map works in Copenhagen, Berlin and Vienna. Her travel report from the trip describes in detail the methods used at these institutions. For example, the Danish Sea Chart Office was using a new method for laying the copper plate, which she then introduced in Sweden.

An office was established for the Kingdom's general cartography in 1912, but as it did not employ a female engraver so Herlin could not be offered regular employment. From 1 July 1923, she was employed as an extra executive with 6 hours of daily working time, but not until 1927 could she apply for and obtain a regular position as an engraver. On 1 February of that year, she was appointed as a regular engraver at the Swedish National Mapping Authority. Olga Herlin had then worked at the plant for 37 years. Despite this long period of service, the current salary regulations did not allow any credit for advancement in salary class, so she was placed in the lowest level within her salary grade.

=== Pension denied ===
In February 1927, Herlin asked the King Gustaf V to credit her service with her previous unofficial employment at the office so she could qualify for a pension. While the majority of the wages commission members supported her petition, the chair opposed it. The government agreed with the chair and the promotion and opportunity for a pension were denied.

In the first parliamentary chamber in 1928, Member of Parliament Kerstin Hesselgren motioned for Herlin to be credited with half of her service time in order to be promoted in salary class, which was necessary to qualify for a pension. Hesselgren underlined the absurdity that a much younger engraver was being paid better than one with 37 years behind her in the profession. In the chamber, Hesselgren appealed to the King noting that her action had the support of Parliament. By the Mapping Authority's regulatory letter in June 1929, Olga Herlin was finally promoted to a higher salary class.

Beginning 1 January 1935, Olga Herlin was granted leave and entitled to a pension. In the same month, for her long, well-deserved service, she was awarded the gold medal For Zeal and Honesty in the Service of the Kingdom. She did not completely lay down her tools, but undertook engraving and retouching work until 1940.

=== Legacy ===
Olga Herlin was the first woman to be elected to the Swedish Cartographic Society in 1920, reflecting her engraving expertise.

Herlin never started a family. She died on 24 April 1965, in Stockholm and is buried in the family grave at the Norra cemetery in Solna.
