= Swedish Church Law 1686 =

Law of the Church of Sweden

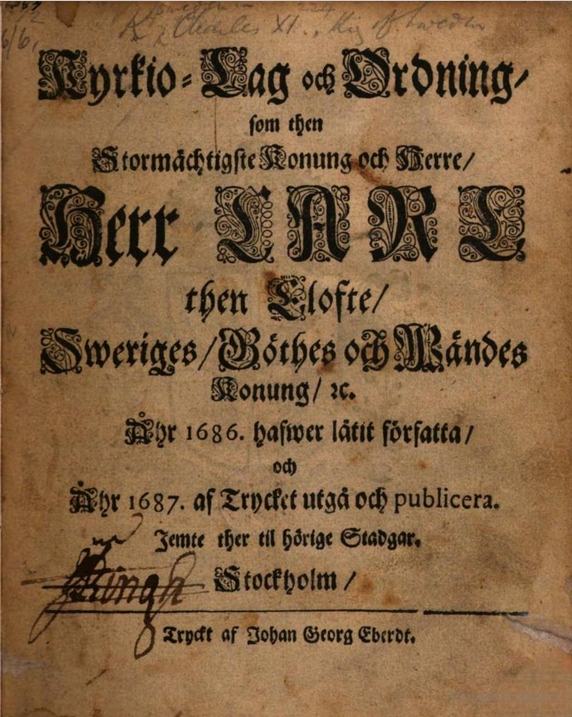
Title page of the first publication, 1687.

The Swedish Church Law 1686 (Swedish: Kyrkio-Lag och Ordning) was a Swedish law which (with some alterations) regulated the relationship between the state and the church in Sweden from 1686 until the Swedish Church Law 1992, as well as in Finland (earlier a Swedish province) until 1870. It replaced the previous Swedish Church Ordinance 1571.

== History ==
During the reign of Charles X Gustav of Sweden, two proposals were put forward to replace the Swedish Church Ordinance 1571: one by Olaus Laurelius and the other by Erik Emporagrius. In 1663, a formal investigation to change the law was initiated, and in 1682, the two proposals were merged. A commission was then established to review the draft, consisting mainly of bishops and superintendents, including Olof Svebilius, Haquin Spegel, Carolus Carlsson and Petrus Stjernman. Their revised proposal was adopted as the 1686 Church Law. The law was translated into Finnish by Henrik Florinus in 1688.

The Swedish Church Law 1686 abolished canon law and the Law of Uppland church charter. The state, represented by the monarch, by then the king of an absolute monarchy, was the head of the Church and thus had final say in matters of the Church, but there was to be no political administration or political bureaucracy between the monarch and the bishops of the Church. Attempts by the state to create an ecclesiastical office with political authority failed due to the resistance of the bishops and clergy.

Among the notable reforms introduced was the husförhör ('household interview'). Henceforth, the parish vicar of every parish of the nation was obliged to conduct an annual survey of the religious knowledge of every household in the parish to ensure all parishioners' knowledge of the Bible and Luther's Small Catechism. A consequence of this was the need for every parishioner, regardless of age and sex, to know how to read, as it would be necessary to read the Bible and the catechism to pass the annual survey. Since the predecessor law from 1571, children's schools for reading, writing and counting had already been an obligation in the cities, but this law resulted in the need for every village and rural community to organise basic schooling for their children, normally by paying a läromäster ('school master') or läromoster ('schoolmadam') to hold lessons in the local vicarage, and from this point forward, illiteracy was close to eradicated in Sweden. This law was in force until 1888. Furthermore, all parish vicars were also forced by law to keep a parish register and note every birth, baptism, death and burial in the parish.

The 1686 Swedish Church Law – with many changes and modernisations – was the standard for both the internal organisation of the Church of Sweden and its status under public law until 1 January 1993. Changes were made, for example, during the Age of Liberty, by Gustav III, through the 1809 Instrument of Government, the 1868 Church Council Regulation and the Dissenter Acts of 1860 and 1873. In the Grand Duchy of Finland, which had until 1809 been a Swedish province, the law applied until the Church Law of 1869 was passed by the Diet of Finland.

== Doctrinal paragraph ==
Doctrine in Sweden was defined between 1686 and 1992 as follows:

Uti wårt Konungarijke och des underliggande Länder, skola alle bekänna sig, endast och allena, til then Christelige Lära och Troo, som är grundad uti Gudz heliga Ord, thet Gamla och Nya Testamentets Prophetiske och Apostoliske Skrifter, och författad uti the tre Hufwud-Symbolis, Apostolico, Nicaeno och Athanasiano, jemwäl uti then oförändrade Augsburgiske Bekännelsen, af åhr 1530, wedertagen i Upsala Concilio, 1593, samt uti hela, så kallade, Libero Concordiae förklarad.

Translation:

In our Kingdom and the countries under it, all shall confess, solely and exclusively, the Christian doctrine and faith, which is founded on the Holy Word of God, the Prophetic and Apostolic Writings of the Old and New Testaments, and written in the three symbols of faith, Apostolic, Nicene and Athanasian, as well as in the unchanged Augsburg Confession of 1530, re-adopted in the Upsala Concilio, 1593, and declared in the whole, so-called, Libero Concordiae.

With the 1686 Church Law, the rest of the Book of Concord was added to the older formulation from the Uppsala Synod, and until 1992 the following confessional writings were valid in Sweden:

- The Bible
- Apostles' Creed
- Nicene Creed
- Athanasian Creed
- Augsburg Confession of 1530
- Decision of the Uppsala Synod of 1593
- Book of Concord

== See also ==
- Kyrkogångsplikt
- Kyrkoplikt
