= Magnus Erikssons landslag =

Swedish legal code issued around 1341

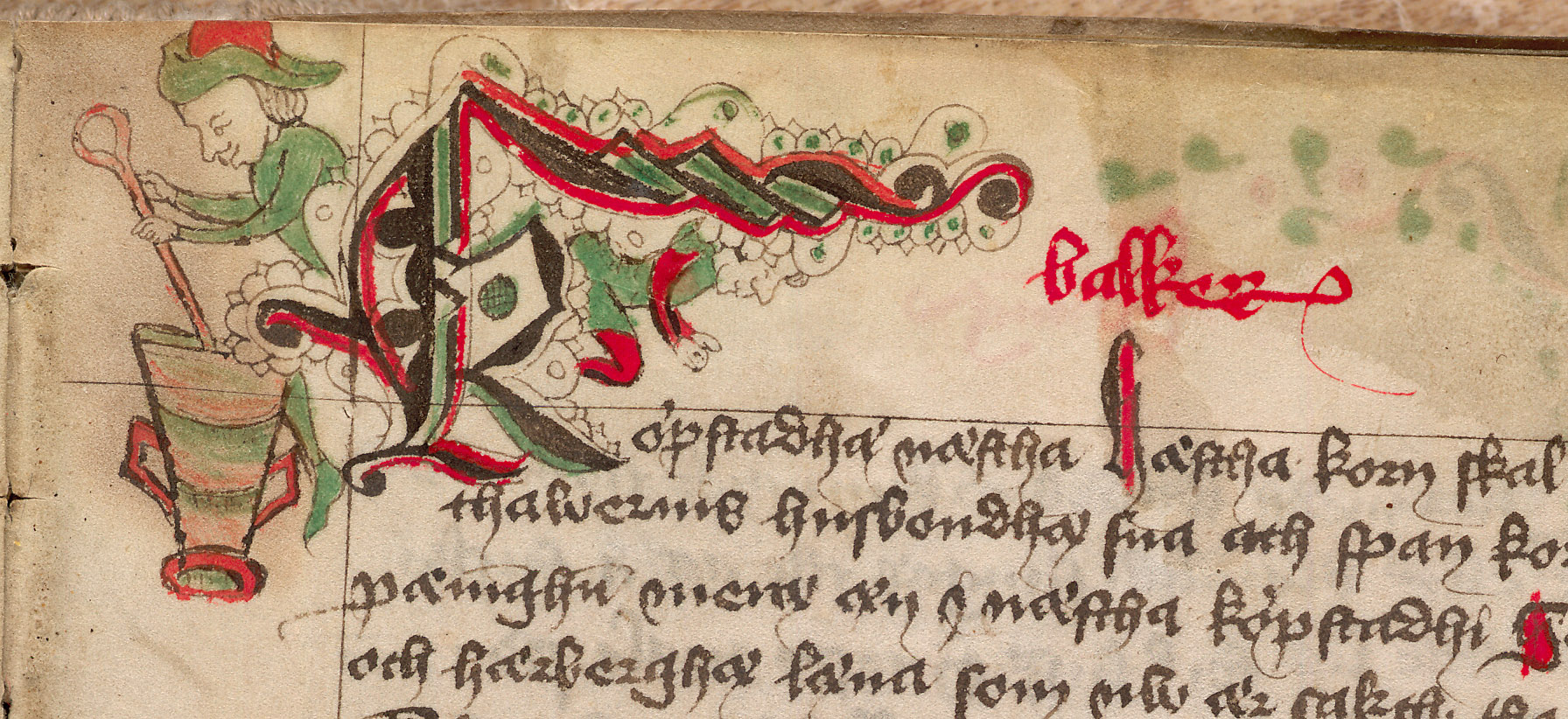
Magnus Erikssons landslag

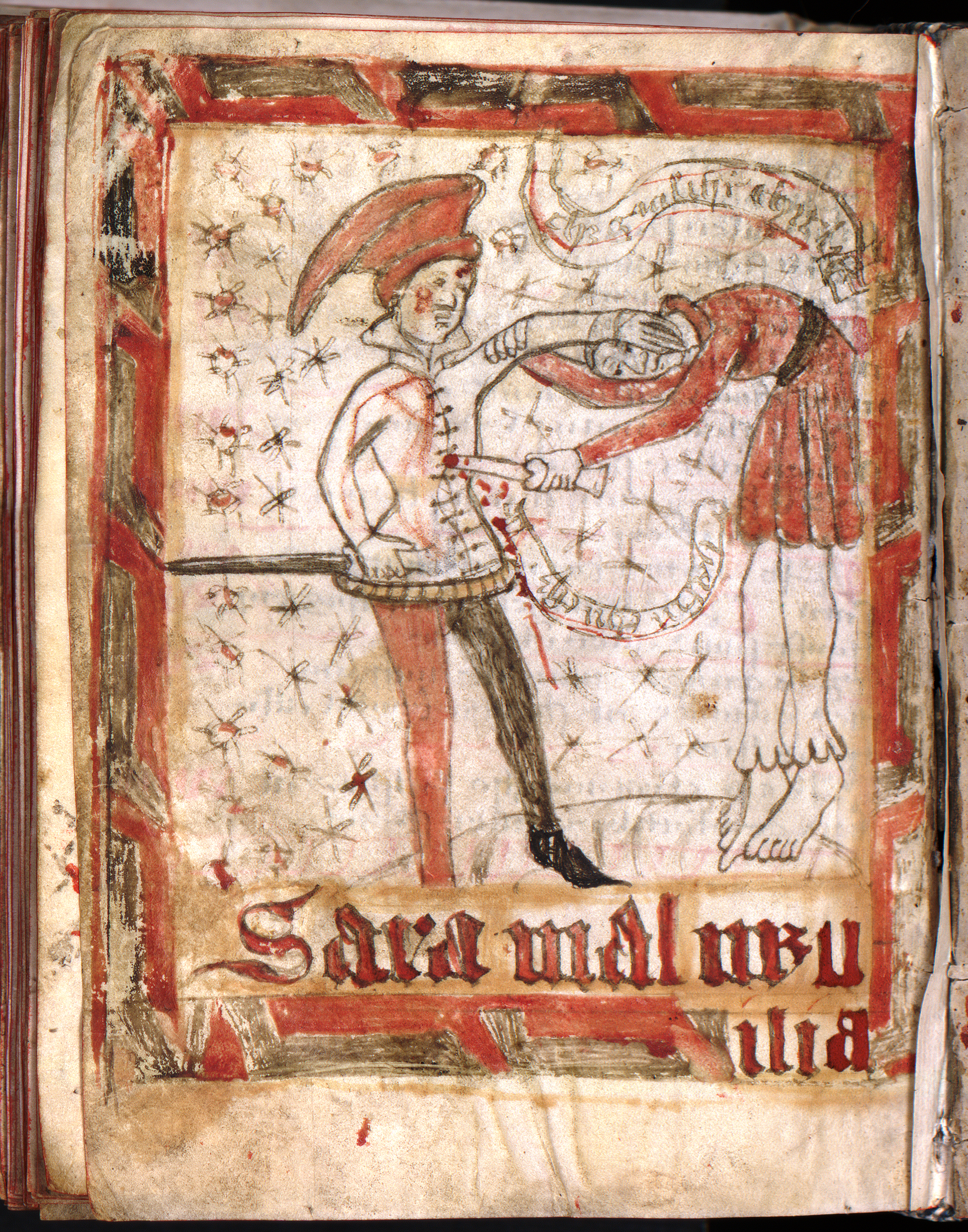
"Deliberate assault", illustrated in Codex B 68 of Magnus Erikssons landslag, c. 1430.

Magnus Erikssons landslag ('Country Law of Magnus Eriksson'), also known simply as the Landslagen ('Country Law'), was a Swedish code of law issued under King Magnus Eriksson around 1341. It was the first attempt to establish a legal code applying throughout the Swedish countryside, replacing the earlier provincial laws of medieval Scandinavian law. The code did not apply to towns and cities, which were governed by the Stadslagen ('City Law'), issued around the same period. Kristofers landslag, promulgated in 1442, was a revised version of the law and remained in force in Sweden until the introduction of the Civil Code of 1734.

== Provisions ==
The royal oath prescribed by the code stated:

The King shall strengthen, love and look after all justice and truth and shall suppress all injustice and untruth and he shall be his peasantry faithful, so that he shall not destroy any poor or rich in any way to his life or limbs without being judged according to the law and he shall not take any property from anyone without being judged according to the law.

The law was divided into the following sections (Swedish: balkar):

- Kyrkobalken – Church
- Konungabalken – King
- Giftermålsbalken – Marriage
- Ärvdabalken – Inheritance
- Jordabalken – Land
- Byggningabalken – Buildings
- Köpmålabalken – Merchants
- Tingmålabalken – Court
- Edsöresbalken – Breach of peace
- Högmålsbalken – Capital cases
- Dråp med vilja – Intentional homicide
- Dråp med våda – Involuntary manslaughter
- Såramål med vilja – Deliberate assault
- Såramål med våda – Accidental assault
- Tjuvabalken – Theft
