= Kerstin Hesselgren =

Swedish politician (1872–1962)

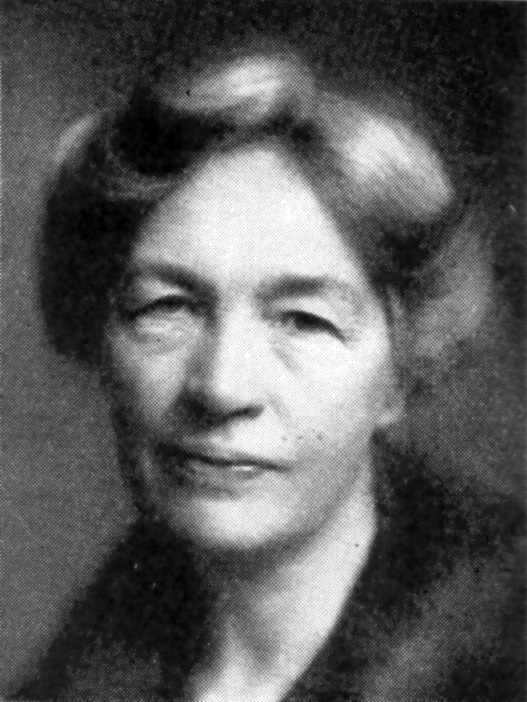
- Kerstin Hesselgren

Member of Parliament Upper Chamber
- In office 1921–1944

Personal details
- Born: 14 January 1872 Torsåker, Gästrikland
- Died: 19 August 1962 (aged 90) Stockholm
- Party: liberal, Independent
- First woman in the Swedish Upper Chamber

Kerstin Hesselgren (14 January 1872 – 19 August 1962) was a Swedish politician. Hesselgren became the first woman to be elected into the Upper House of the Swedish Parliament after female suffrage was introduced in 1921. She was elected by suggestion of the Liberals with support from the Social democrats.

== Biography ==
Hesselgren was born at Torsåker, Hofors, Gästrikland. She was the eldest daughter of a provincial medical doctor Gustaf Alfred Hesselgren and Maria Margareta Wærn. She was the eldest of six children. She never married.

She was educated by a governess at home and then at a girl school in Switzerland. In 1895, she graduated as a feldsher in Uppsala; in 1896. The following year she led the School of Domestic Science in Stockholm. Whilst on leave she qualified as a Sanitary Inspector from Bedford college in 1905 and left the college and her job in 1906.

=== Early career ===
Kerstin Hesselgren worked as a sanitary-inspector in Stockholm from 1912 to 1934 and school kitchen inspector from 1909 to 1934.

Hesselgren had originally wished to be a physician, but her weak constitution had made her unfit for this profession. Instead, she educated herself for the profession of Sanitary Inspector, to be able to focus on better health conditions through inspection and improvement of the living conditions in the capital, which were, at that time, appalling for the working classes. She did manage to introduce improvements, which made her respected in political circles.

She was chairperson of the Swedish School Teachers Society from 1906 to 1913. She was management director of the Women's Work Environment Inspection from 1913 to 1934, and was also one of the founders of the magazine Tidevarvet which was launched in 1923.

In July 1925, Hesselgren attended and spoke at the First International Conference of Women in Science, Industry and Commerce held in London, organised by Caroline Haslett and the British Women's Engineering Society.

From 1906 onward, she received a number of political assignments.

=== Politician ===
Hesselgren was given the Illis Quorum award in 1918, and in 1921 she became one of the five first women to be elected to the Swedish Parliament after the introduction of women's suffrage alongside Nelly Thüring (Social Democrat), Agda Östlund (Social Democrat) Elisabeth Tamm (liberal) and Bertha Wellin (Conservative) in the Lower Chamber.

Hesselgren was alone in the Upper Chamber and thereby became the first woman there. She was a liberal from 1922 to 1923 and from 1937 to 1944 and Independent from 1923 to 1937. Until 1934, however, she formally labeled herself as belonging of no particular party in parliament, because she had been elected with the support by two parties.

She was Vice Chairman of the second legislation committee of the parliament from 1939 to 1944, and also in this capacity the first of her gender in Sweden.

Kerstin Hesselgren, being the first of her gender in parliament, regarded herself to be the spokesperson of women in the Upper Chamber. Hesselgren was active within gender and social issues. She worked for the access of all political positions and equal salary for both sexes, for the legalisation of sex education and birth control and to lower the punishment for abortion. She also successfully intervened in the case of cartographer Olga Herlin who had been denied a state pension despite 37 years of service as Sweden's first female engraver.

Hesselgren was well known and received a lot of attention for these issues. Many of her ideas were inspired by her mentor, the politician Emilia Broomé, and could be found already among the ideas of Bromée.

She was the President of the National Council of Swedish Women in 1931-1949.

Along with Albert Einstein, Hesselgren was one of the sponsors of the Peoples' World Convention (PWC), also known as Peoples' World Constituent Assembly (PWCA), which took place in 1950-51 at Palais Electoral, Geneva, Switzerland.

Hesselgren died in Stockholm at the age of 90. The University of Gothenburg established the Kerstin Hesselgren Visiting Professorship in her memory. It is awarded to outstanding female researchers in the social sciences or humanities.

== See also ==
- Kata Dalström
- Hanna Lindberg
- Olivia Nordgren
