= Henrik Florinus =

Finnish priest, writer and translator

- Born: 1633
- Died: 12 April 1705

Henrik Florinus (1633 – 12 April 1705), born Henricus Florinus, was a Finnish priest, writer and translator. In 1702, he published the first collection of Finnish proverbs called Wanhain suomalaisten tawaliset ja suloiset sananlascut ("Customary and Beautiful Proverbs of the Old Finns"). Florinus also proofread the language of the Bible and compiled a noteworthy Latin-Swedish-Finnish dictionary.

== History ==
Florinus' parents were clergyman Matthias Erici Florinus of Paimio and Elisabet Henriksdotter. He began studying at the Academy of Turku in 1650 and became a Master in 1656. During his studies, he wound up in fights and was even charged with assault. However the charges was dropped.

After graduating, Florinus completed postgraduate studies because he did not get the position he applied for. During this time he married Valborg Larsdotter Tammelinus in 1658. He finally got a temporary position as a stand-in for a preacher in Kimito in 1660–1661. Two years later, Florinus became a clergyman in Hämeenlinna and a teacher of pedagogy.

After his first wife died, he married Beata Davidsdotter Gyllenbögel, with whom he had two children: Henrik Florinus Jr and Samuel. He became a clergyman in his home town of Paimio in 1671 and vigorously began to look out for his parish. He even used his own money for the construction of a new stone church.

In addition to his work, Florinus compiled a Latin-Swedish-Finnish dictionary Nomenclatura rerum brevissima latino-sveco-finnonica. In his writing, Florinus probably used Swedish texts as an aid, to which Finnish words had been added. The dictionary was published in 1678. Having a good command of Finnish, Florinus made his dictionary much more clearer than its predecessor and also came up with new words. The dictionary was reprinted in 1695 and later a third printing which included German vocabulary.

After the death of his second wife in 1675, Florinus married Katarina Eriksdotter Pihli, widow of the chaplain of Halikko. They had two sons. All together, with his three wives, Florinus had 18 children.

In 1680, Florinus was elected for parliament from his clergy. The next year, he received another honorable tribute because he was elected to review the language and its form of the Bible in 1642. Florinus completed his review of the Old Testament in 1682 and two years later did the New Testament. He had good lingual qualifications for this work because he was able to understand both Finnish and the original languages of the Bible. The new printing, containing 2,200 verses, was a success. In 1688, Florinus translated the Swedish Church Law 1686 into Finnish.

In 1689, the parish of Paimio was consigned to the subordination of the Academy of Turku whereupon Florinus lost his post. It was a bitter time for him although he got a clergyman's post in Kimito. The Kimito period was contentious: he had many disagreements with the parishioners about his wages.

Florinus became inspired to collect proverbs in 1695 after getting the collections of Gabriel Tammelin in his possession who died that same year. At the encouragement of his friends, he published them and also his own collection of proverbs Wanhain suomalaisten tawaliset ja suloiset sananlascut in 1702.

The corpus was geographically emphasised on proverbs found in Satakunta, Southwest Finland and Häme. The book contains over 1,500 proverbs, five times more than the German book of proverbs from 1529. The book received a rather positive reception because it had not been seen that proverbs are pagan in the same was as folk poetry.

In 1699, Florinus succeeded in getting his position back in Paimio as a stand-in for an official and soon became a permanent member of the clergy. His oldest son was appointed clergyman of Kimito. Florinus spent the rest of his years in Paimio. He published a book in Finnish in 1705 Yxi lyhykäinen opetus oikiasta wanhurscaudesta ("One brief lesson about true righteousness"). However, not one copy of this text, as far as is known, has been salvaged. Florinus died that same year.

== Books ==
- Disputatio ethica de virtute (1654)
- Epitome theologiae e sacris literis (1673)
- Nomenclatura rerum brevissima latino-sveco-finnonica (1678)
- Oratio metrica de poesi (1652)
- Quaestiones theologicae (1672)
- Wanhain suomalaisten tawaliset ja suloiset sananlascut (1702)
- Yxi lyhykäinen opetus oikiasta wanhurscaudesta (1705)

== Sources ==
- Fennica, Suomen kansallisbibliografia
- Laine, Tuija: Henricus Florinus. Kansallisbiografia
- Ylioppilasmatrikkeli 1640–1852.
