= Infanticide Act (Sweden) =

The Infanticide Act (Swedish: Barnamordsplakatet), often referred to as "Infanticide act of Gustav III" (Gustav III:s barnamordsplakat) after its instigator Gustav III of Sweden, was a historical Swedish law, which was introduced in 1778 and in effect until 1917, with alterations in 1856.

The law was introduced in order to prevent infanticides, the killings of newborn children outside of marriage, and granted mothers both the right and the means for an anonymous birth. Its 1856 amendment however restricted this to a mere confidential birth, where the midwife was ordered to keep the mother's name in a sealed envelope to allow the grown-up child to request undisclosure of its biological ancestry.

== Original act of 1778 ==
The problem of infanticide was since long acknowledged to be affected by the social stigma condemning unmarried mothers: previously, a reform of 1741 abolished the Public humiliation punishment of Uppenbar kyrkoplikt for unmarried mothers to prevent infanticide, and the Infanticide Act of 1778 was a continuation of this work.

It allowed for mothers to give birth anonymously, to spare them social embarrassment and difficulty. It also forbade the midwife to ask for the name of the father, which they had previously been obliged to do. The mother was allowed to leave her home area and give birth in an area where she was unknown without having to answer any questions about her identity. The birth certificate should only include the date of the birth and the name of the child, while its mother should be registered as "Mother Unknown".

The child would then be placed in an orphanage. However, if the father was known, he could bring the child from the orphanage, midwife or the home where the "anonymous" woman had given birth to his home as a foster child. The mother might then join him, officially as a nurse to care for the baby, and very often the couple got married. The child was then a legitimate child to the man and had his name. The word "stepmother" disappeared from most official papers, as a married woman taking care of the children in her household would be recognized legally as their mother.

== 1856 amendment ==
In 1856, the law was amended. The midwife was now ordered to advise the mother at a secret birth to write down her name and home address in a sealed envelope. The mother was then to have the vicar in the town where she gave birth to put his seal on it and keep it safe. The paper could also be kept at the birth registration office. The function of the paper was to enable the mother to claim her child if she should wish it after having left it after birth. They could also be opened on request by the child.

The law from 1856 states:

"If a midwife is called upon during a confidential parturition, or, if she receives a woman in childbirth who wishes to remain anonymous, the midwife is prohibited to inquire about the name of the child's father, as well as to entice, persuade, extort, or to conduct further investigations into any potentially related information. Although the delivery may have been confidential, it is not the further task of a midwife to also conceal the child, nor to provide aid or assistance in such an undertaking. At a confidential parturition, the midwife is urged to advise the child's mother to disclose her name and address onto a paper, sealed by herself, later to be assigned with the official seal of the vicar, to whom she is hastily to report the delivery. When the document has been signed by the concerned and provided with a seal by the vicar, the woman should be urged—for her own, as well as for the certitude of the child—to carefully store said document. "

== 1917 abolition ==
In 1917, the law was abolished and the possibility to give birth anonymously was criminalized.

== See also ==
- Women in Sweden
- Timeline of reproductive rights legislation

== Sources ==
- Lindstedt Cronberg, Marie, 'Barnamordsplakatet: en straffrättsreform med oanade konsekvenser', Brottsförebyggande rådets tidskrift Apropå., 1994:1, s. 24–29, 1994
