= Laurentius Petri Aboicus =

Laurentius Petri Aboicus (1605–1671) was a Finnish priest and historian. He was born in Turku and was vicar in Tammela from 1648.

Laurentius Petri Aboicus, also called L.P. Tammelinus, published an extraordinary chronicle titled Ajan tieto Suomenmaan menois ja uscost (1658). It was the first history book in Finnish.
