= Agda Östlund =

Swedish politician (1870–1942)

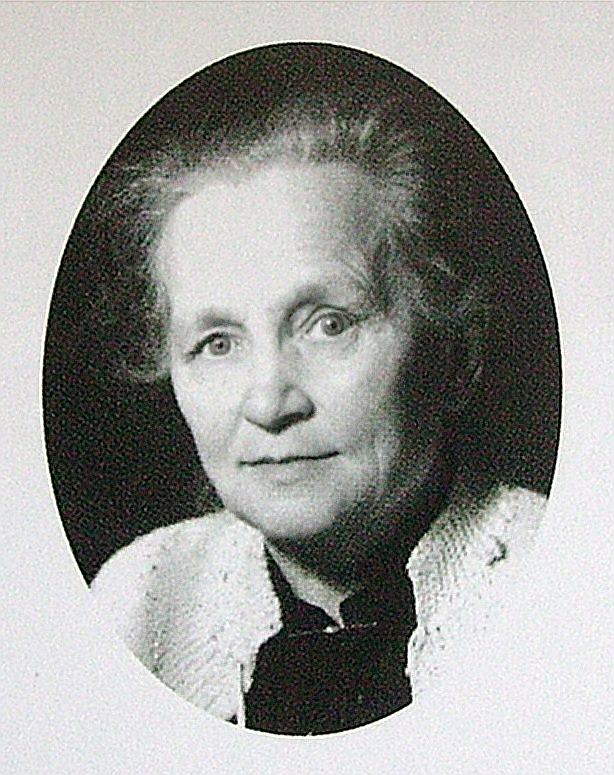
- Agda Östlund

MP for the Social democrats
- In office 1921–1940

Personal details
- Born: 3 April 1870
- Died: 1942 (aged 71–72)
- Party: Social Democrats

Agda Maria Östlund, née Lundgren (3 April 1870 – 26 June 1942) was a Swedish Politician of the Social Democrats. She was one of the first four women to be elected to the Swedish parliament after the introduction of women suffrage.

== Life ==
Agda Östlund was born in a working-class home in Köping. Her family was politically aware and encouraged her to be so as well. Her mother made sure that her brothers took as much part in the household chores as Agda. She trained and supported herself as a seamstress from the age of fourteen. She eventually founded her own sewing studio with several employees. She married the steel worker Anders Östlund, with whom she had a daughter, and moved to Stockholm in 1896.

=== Early political career ===
Östlund became active in the Social Democratic labour movement early on. She was a member of the Stockholms allmänna kvinnoklubb ('Stockholm Women's Public Club') from 1903, served as chairman in 1904–05; member of the Socialdemokratiska kvinnokongressen (Social Democratic Women's Congress) in 1908–1920; board member of the Social Democratic Women in Sweden in 1920–1936, and a board member of the Poor Help Board of the Matteus Parish in Stockholm in 1916–1932.

In 1902, the Social Democratic Women, through the Stockholms allmänna kvinnoklubb, decided the cooperate with the Swedish Suffrage movement. Östlund was active in the struggle for women suffrage, and made many nationwide journeys to speak in its favour.

=== Parliamentary career ===
In 1921, Agda Östlund became one of the five first women to be elected to the Swedish Parliament after women suffrage alongside Nelly Thüring (Social Democrat), Bertha Wellin (Conservative) and Elisabeth Tamm (liberal) in the Lower chamber, and Kerstin Hesselgren in the Upper chamber. Östlund remained in the Parliament until 1940.

In parliament, Agda Östlund became the first woman MP to speak in the Swedish Second Chamber. She opened her speech by saying: “Äntligen stod kvinnan i talarstolen” ['Finally, the woman stood in the speaker’s chair'], rewording a phrase from the Gösta Berling's Saga: “Äntligen stod prästen i predikstolen” ['Finally the preacher stood in the preacher’s chair'].

She was also the first of her gender to be appointed member of the Parliament's Legislative Committee as a representative of her party. Östlund engaged in the question of spousal abuse, women's pension and medical care for women and children. She also raised the question of abortion, during which several MPs left the room in protest.

Agda Östlund was regarded as a representative and role model for many working-class women. Asked where she was given the courage to involve in politics, she answered: "When you truly want something, you are given courage".

== Bibliography ==
- Flood, Hulda (1954). Agda Östlund: pionjär i genombrottstid. Skrifter / utgivna av Arbetarnas kulturhistoriska sällskap, 99-0560030-2; N.F., 16. Stockholm: Kooperativa förbundets bokförlag. Libris 1179637
