= Bertha Wellin =

Swedish politician (Conservative) and nurse

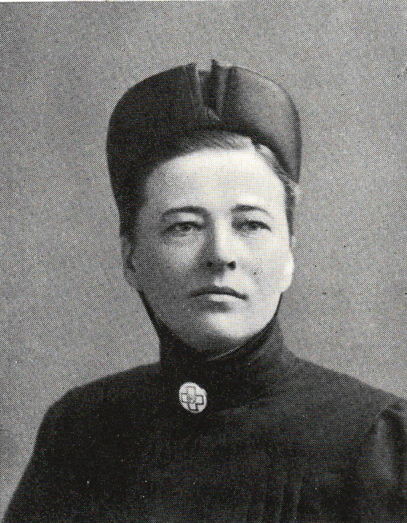

member of the Riksdag
- In office 1921–1935

member of the Stockholm City Council
- In office 1912-1927

Personal details
- Born: 11 September 1870
- Died: 27 July 1951

Bertha Wellin (11 September 1870 – 27 July 1951), was a Swedish politician (Conservative) and nurse. She was one of the first five women to be elected into the Swedish parliament.

== Life ==
Bertha Wellin was the daughter of the tax collector of Vickleby Alrik Wellin and Jenny Melén.

=== Nursing career ===
She was educated as a nurse at the Sophiahemmet in Stockholm, and was employed within the Stockholm Poor Care.

She was a board member of several of the medical centers in Stockholm, such as Sophiahemmet (1917). She was a co-founder and a member of the board of directors of the Svensk sjuksköterskeförening ('Swedish Nurses Association') or SSF in 1910 and chairperson in 1914–1933. From 1920, she served a member of the board of directors in the Committee of Nordic Nurses Cooperation. From 1911, she was the editor of Svensk sjukskötersketidning ('Paper of the Swedish Nurse').

=== Political career ===
She was elected to the Stockholm City Council in 1912-1927. In 1919, she became a board of directors of the Public Health Care. In 1921, she became one of the first five women to be elected to the Swedish Parliament after women suffrage alongside Nelly Thüring (Social Democrat), Agda Östlund (Social Democrat) and Elisabeth Tamm (liberal) in the Lower chamber, and Kerstin Hesselgren in the Upper chamber. She left her seat in 1935.

As an MP, Bertha Wellin was foremost engaged in issues regarding the nursing profession. As a conservative, her views of nursing was that it was not to be regarded as a profession but as a holy calling of mercy, and her work both as an MP and as head of the Nursing Association was affected by this view, which blocked questions regarding higher wages and less working hours. This caused gradually more conflicts within the nursing association when the association became more dominated by nurses who did not come from a wealthy background, needed their wages for financial reasons, demanded higher wages and set working hours and wished to be regarded as professionals rather than philanthropic workers. In 1932–33, the professional party had gained majority within the nursing association, and Bertha Wellin saw herself forced to resign from her chair, leaving the meeting as well as the association singing psalms. She left her seat as well when she did not run for the 1936 election.

Bertha Wellin was given the Florence Nightingale Medal in 1935.

== Sources ==
- ”Nordisk familjebok, Wellin, Bertha". 1904–1926.
- Svenska dagbladets årsbok. Stockholm: Svenska dagbladet. 1936. Sid. 22. Libris 283647
- Dufva, S., G (2010). Klass och genus i vården. I H. Strömberg & H. Eriksson (Red.), Genusperspektiv på vård och omvårdnad (s.50).
- Ann-Cathrine Haglund, Ann-Marie Petersson, Inger Ström-Billing, red (2004). Moderata pionjärer: kvinnor i politiskt arbete 1900–2000. Stockholm: Sällskapet för moderata kvinnors historia. Libris 9666368. ISBN 91-631-5862-0 (inb.) Bertha Wellin, 1870–1951. Högerns första kvinnliga riksdagsledamot av Stina Nicklasson och Ann-Marie Petersson
