= Nelly Thüring =

Swedish photographer, politician (1875–1972)

- Nelly Thüring
- Born: 21 June 1875; Vankiva, Sweden
- Died: 2 January 1972 (aged 96); Stockholm, Sweden
- Known for: Photography, Politics
- Spouse: Johan Göransson (m. 1903–1917)

Nelly Maria Thüring (21 June 1875, in Vankiva – 2 January 1972, in Enskede), was a Swedish photographer and politician (Social Democrat). She was one of the first five women elected to the Swedish parliament in 1921.

== Biography ==
Thüring was born the daughter of the farmer Nils Nilsson and Pernilla Persdotter in Vankiva, Sweden on 21 June 1875. She married the editor Johan Göransson in 1903, and divorced him in 1917. She took the name Thüring when she became active as a photographer.

She was a shop clerk in 1890-96 and thereafter a photographer 1896–1933. In 1900, she opened a photo studio in Lund. In 1920 she sold the studio to focus solely on her political career.

She was a member of the city council of Gothenburg in 1917–1920. In 1921, she became one of the five first women to be elected to the Swedish Parliament after women were allowed to vote. She was elected alongside Agda Östlund (Social Democrat), Bertha Wellin (Conservative) and Elisabeth Tamm (liberal) in the lower chamber, and Kerstin Hesselgren in the upper chamber.

As an MP, Nelly Thüring focused on issues about international cooperation and the working conditions of female prison staff, and collaborated with other female MP:s on issues about a non-confessional school, child-and maternity care, and sexual education. She was described as sharp and witty during the debates, and opposed the suggestion to gender-mark the voting bills with the remark that if that would happen, she would start a women's party. In the 1920s, it was regarded as controversial by some for a woman to address sexual issues in public to a gender mixed audience, and initially, when such instances occurred, it was noted that some of the male MPs left the chamber in protest. She chose to leave her seat in 1928 because she did not particularly enjoy the forms of parliamentary work, which she found slow and tedious, and preferred to agitate (that is, to be a political activist by touring, making speeches and through political and social organisations) instead.

She was a member of the central committee of Social Democratic Women in 1924-1928 and chairperson of the Enskede Social Democratic Women's Club in 1926–1928.

Thüring died on 2 January 1972 in Stockholm.
