= Gun Hägglund =

Swedish television host and translator

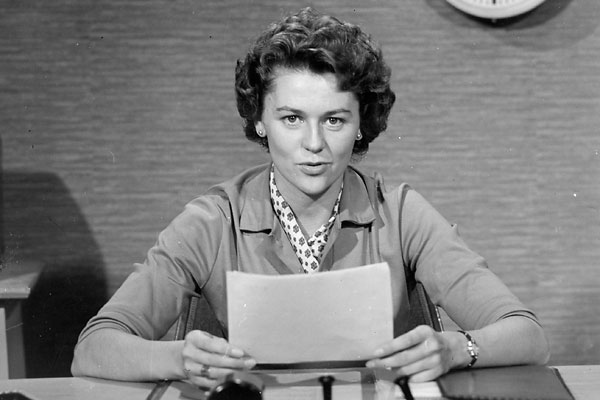
- Gun Hägglund in Aktuellt (1958)
- Born: Karin Gunvor Hägglund; 2 March 1932; Örnsköldsvik, Sweden
- Died: 19 August 2011 (aged 79); Visby, Sweden
- Occupation: Television journalist
- Years active: 1955–2000
- Notable credit(s): Aktuellt co-anchor (1958–); Razzel co-anchor (1983–86)
- Spouse(s): Karl-Axel Sjöblom (−1982); Jan Hörnell

Karin Gunvor Sjöblom Hägglund (2 March 1932 – 19 August 2011), better known as Gun Hägglund, was a Swedish television host and translator. Hägglund was the first female television news anchor in Sweden, hosting the Swedish national evening news show Aktuellt in 1958. She is sometimes credited as the first female television news reader in the world, but that claim is inaccurate as British ITN Midday News included female bulletin presenter Barbara Mandell in 1955 and BBC Regional news bulletin included Armine Sandford in 1957.

Gun Hägglund started her career at Swedish Radio in 1955 where she worked at the foreign news desk as a secretary and program announcer. She moved on to Swedish Television in 1958 to become Sweden's first female news anchor in the national news show Aktuellt, often accompanied by pioneer news anchor Olle Björklund. In addition, Hägglund was a translator of foreign motion pictures and television series. In an interview from 1966, Hägglund describes the rather complicated process of translating textual versions of the dialog in films and television programs into short subtitles of text at the bottom of the screen.

For the general public, Hägglund is probably best known for her participation in Swedish television's entertainment programs and daily shows such as Halvsju (Half Past Six O'Clock), Razzel, Träna med TV (Workout with TV), and Café Sundsvall. Hägglund was married to news editor Karl-Axel Sjöblom (known as KAS) with whom she co-hosted Halvsju, one of the most popular television shows in Swedish history. They were married until his death in 1982.

For 30 years, until 1997, Hägglund was closely involved in the Svenska Cykelfrämjandet (National Association for Promotion of Cycling), first as Secretary-General, and later Executive Chairman. In that capacity, she published a number of books about cycling. In 1986, Hägglund moved from the Swedish capital of Stockholm to the Baltic island of Gotland. She died in Visby after a short illness in 2011.
