= Stadslagen =

Medieval Swedish legal code

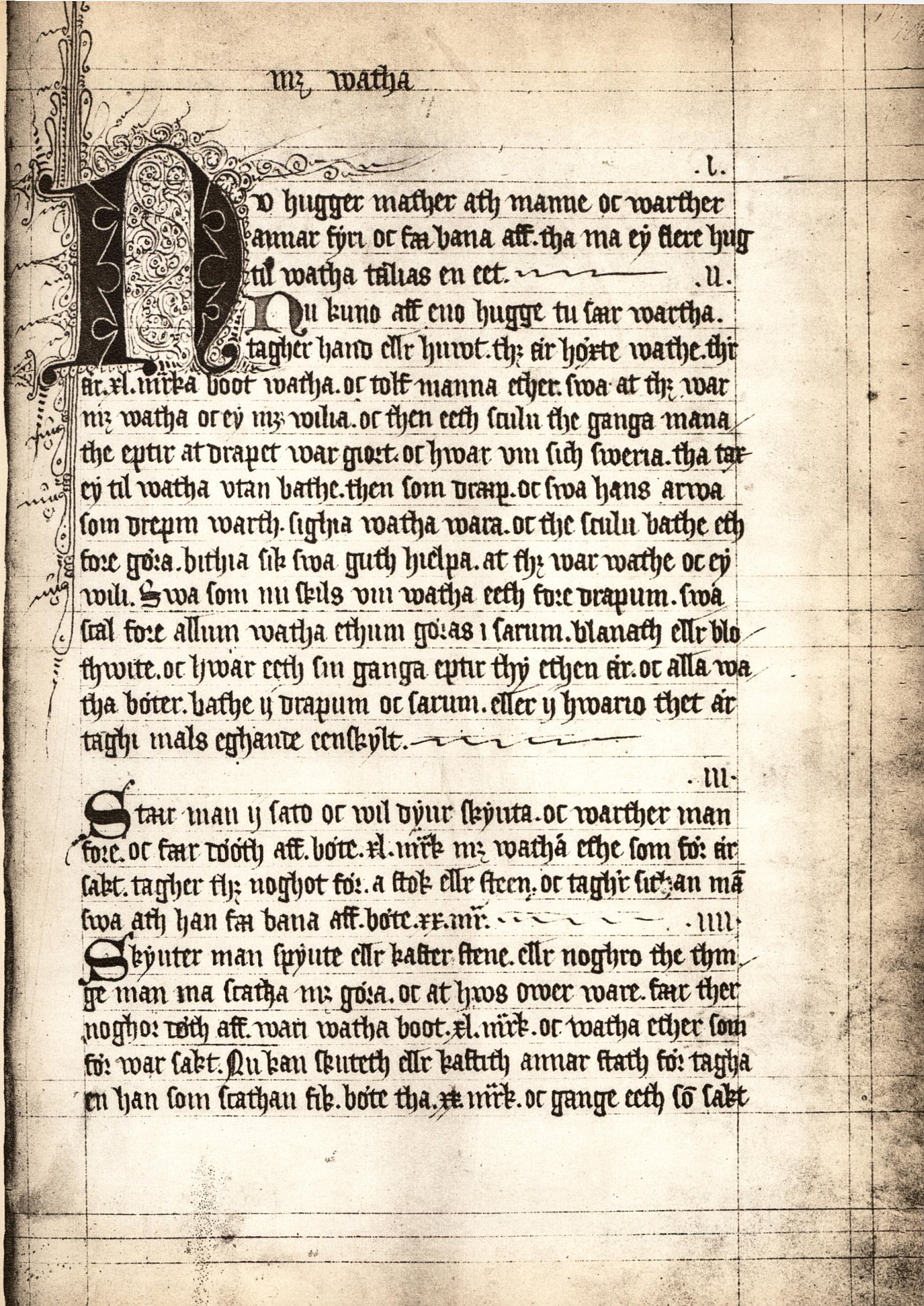
Stadslagen Swedish code of law

The Stadslagen ('City Law'), was a Swedish code of law passed by King Magnus Eriksson in circa 1350. It governed the life in the cities of Sweden until 1734.

The Stadslagen was passed in about the same time as the Magnus Erikssons landslag ('Country Law of Magnus Eriksson'), and as the former was to apply in the countryside, the city law was to apply in the cities. The law was strongly influenced by the contemporary German town law, as the Swedish cities at the time had many German settlers.

In 1442, the country law was succeeded by the Kristofers landslag, but the city law was merely incorporated in this and left unaltered and uncontested. It was printed in 1618. It was in effect in Sweden until the Civil Code of 1734.

The name Stadslag is also used as a common name for the other city laws issued in Medieval Sweden.
