= Kyrkogångsplikt =

Former religious law in Sweden

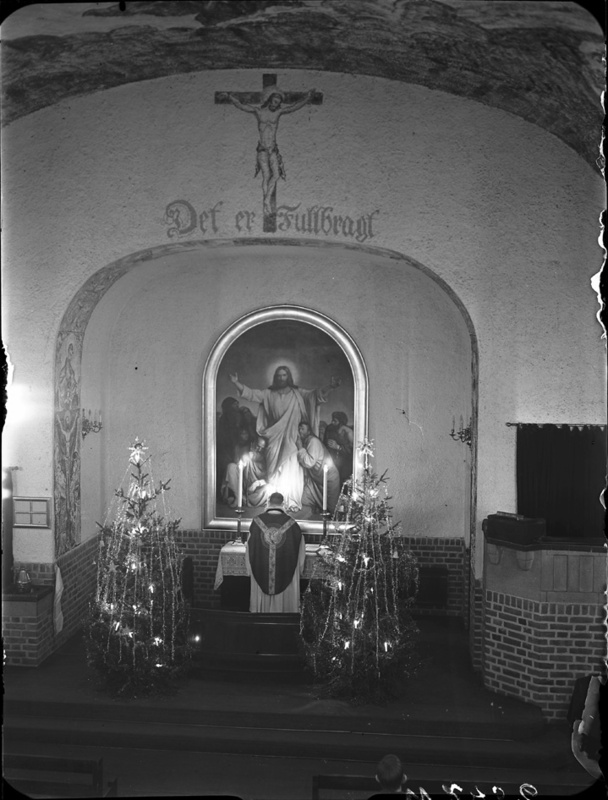
The Holy Mass being celebrated ad orientem by a Lutheran priest on Christmas Day in Norway (1942)

Kyrkogångsplikt (literally 'church attendance duty') was the legal obligation of the population in Sweden to attend weekly Mass.

The legal obligation to attend church was abolished in Sweden with the 1809 Instrument of Government, but continued in Finland for some time. At the same time, the formal compulsion to take communion ended. The abolition the same marked a step towards religious freedom in Sweden, a Christian state where Lutheranism (Church of Sweden) was the state church until 2000.

Though no longer binding by civil law in Scandinavia, the attendance of Mass on the Lord's Day (Sunday) is enjoined by the tenets of the Evangelical Lutheran Christian faith. The Evangelical Lutheran theologian Balthasar Münter stated that church attendance is the "foundation for the Christian life" as "the Christian Bible and the sacraments provide the framework for the faith"; he also states that it is important for believers because it aids in the prevention of backsliding, as well as offers "the company of other believers". The Large Catechism holds the Lord's Day to be reserved for the public worship of God, including the preaching of the Gospel:

...since from of old Sunday [the Lord’s Day] has been appointed for this purpose, we also should continue the same, in order that everything be done in harmonious order, and no one create disorder by unnecessary innovation. Therefore this is the simple meaning of the commandment: since holidays are observed anyhow, such observance should be devoted to hearing God’s Word, so that the special function of this day should be the ministry of the Word for the young and the mass of poor people; yet that the resting be not so strictly interpreted as to forbid any other incidental work that cannot be avoided.

== See also ==
- Conventicle Act (Sweden) – law outlawing religious meetings other than those of the state church
- Kyrkoplikt – a historical form of punishment
