= Anna Branzell =

Swedish architect

- Born: Anna Lous-Mohr; 30 March 1895; Bergen
- Died: 19 July 1983 (aged 88)
- Education: Royal Institute of Technology
- Occupation: Architect
- Spouse: Sten Branzell
- Practice: Associated architectural firm[s]

Anna Branzell, also Anna Lous-Mohr Branzell (née Mohr; 30 March 1895 – 19 July 1983) was a Norwegian-born Swedish architect. She was the first woman to earn a degree in architecture in Sweden, graduating from the Royal Institute of Technology in 1919.

== Biography ==
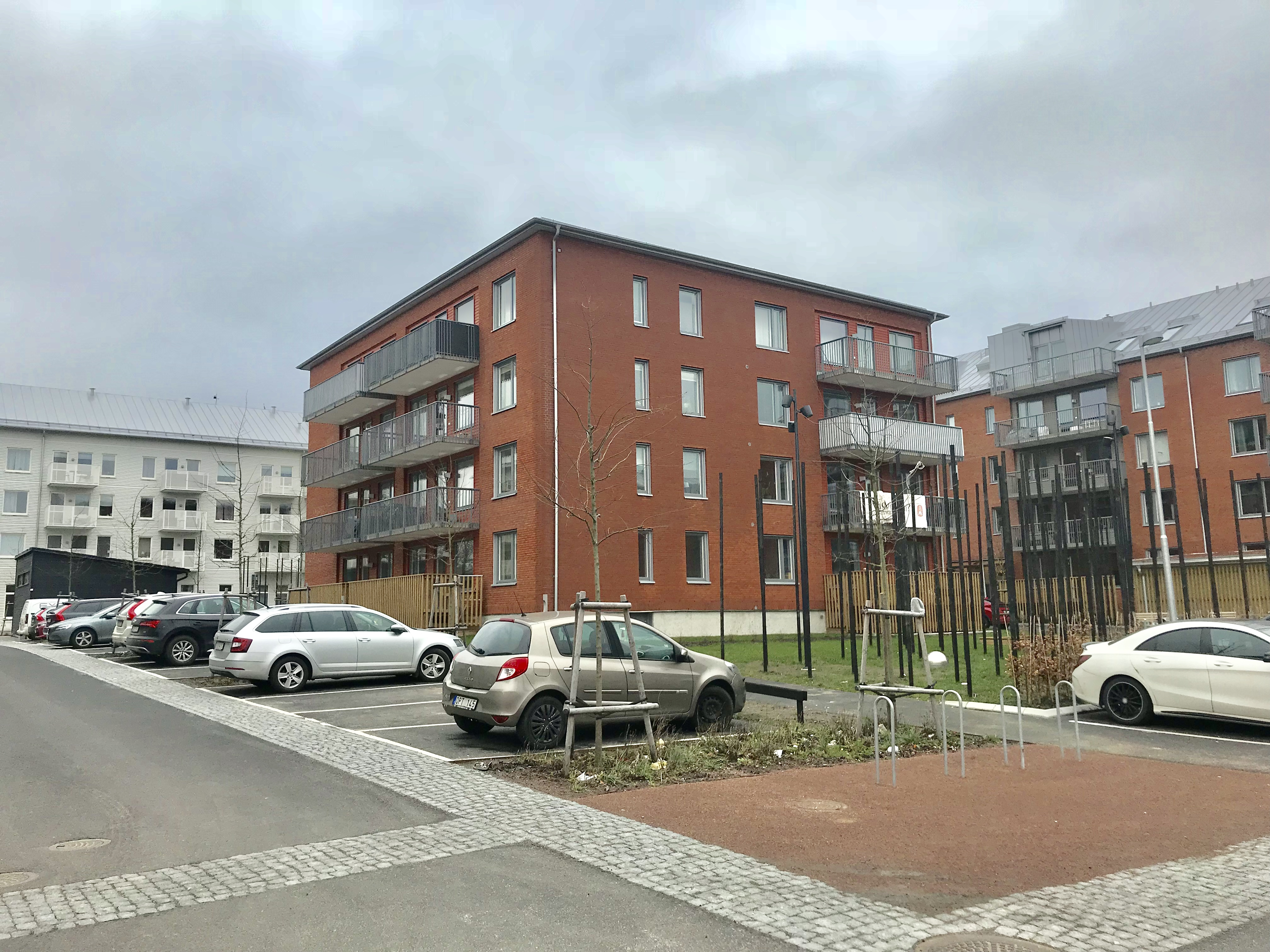
Anna Branzells Gata in Kviberg, Göteborg, 2020.

Born in the Norwegian city of Bergen, Branzell was the daughter of Olaf Mohr, a Lutheran pastor, and Jeanette Lous. As a young girl, she had hoped to study medicine but was prevented from doing so by the effects of scarlet fever on her hearing and memory. When she attempted to study architecture at the Royal Institute, Professor Lars Israel Wahlman (1870–1952) tried to dissuade her, telling her that women architects just spoilt their hands on building sites. That convinced her she should go ahead regardless and she graduated in 1919. Thereafter she became an intern with three of Sweden's most notable architects: Gunnar Asplund, Sigurd Lewerentz and Hakon Ahlberg, before continuing her studies in the United States. In 1923, she returned to Bergen where she married the Swedish architect Sten Branzell (1893–1959).

One of the Branzells' first assignments was to submit plans for renovating and extending the Kviberg Cemetery in the north of Gothenburg. They won second prize, Asplund won the competition. As time went by, Anna Branzell herself became increasingly interested in social housing, parks, playgrounds and the place of children in society. In 1932, she designed an orphanage on Uddevallagatan, now the offices of an electronics firm. Many of her drawings from the time when she participated in urban planning can be seen in the city archives.

Sten Branzell, who became Gothenburg's city planner, died in 1959 but Anna lived until the summer of 1983, reaching the age of 88. They are both buried in Kviberg Cemetery.
