= Kristofers landslag =

Medieval Swedish legal code

Kristofers landslag ('The Country Law of Christopher') was a code of law passed under Christopher of Bavaria as king of Sweden in 1442. It was an amended version of the original national law, the Magnus Erikssons landslag from circa 1350. It was in effect in Sweden until the Civil Code of 1734.

== History ==
It is unclear whether the law was ever confirmed by king Christopher. It was used in parallel to the previous Magnus Erikssons landslag. It was to be used in the country side (hence its name), while the cities were still to be governed by the Stadslagen (City law) from 1350. In 1608, the Kristofers landslag was reprinted on the order of Charles IX of Sweden, which solved the question about which law to use. The judges were also granted the right to use the old Medieval Scandinavian law in the cases when the law of 1442 was unclear.

The law was also amended with the law texts from the Law of Moses of the bible. The 1608 biblical amendments to the Kristofers landslag, made the law seem draconian and resulted in cruel punishments for notably sexually related offences. However, as the local courts had the obligation to present their sentences to the higher courts, the biblical sentences were in practice rarely performed, as it became normal procedure for the higher courts to revoke them by claiming mitigating circumstances.

The Kristofers landslag was used uncontested in Sweden from 1608 until the Civil Code of 1734.

It is divided into the following Books (Swedish: "balkar")

- Byggningabalken - Buildings
- Dråp med våda - Manslaughter
- Edsöresbalken - Breach of Peace
- Giftomålsbalken - Marriage
- Högmålsbalken - Capital cases
- Jordabalken - Land
- Konungsbalken - The King
- Såramål med vilja - Deliberate Assault
- Såramål med våda - Accidental assault
- Tingsmålsbalken - Court
- Tjuvabalken - Theft
