= Hanna Lindberg =

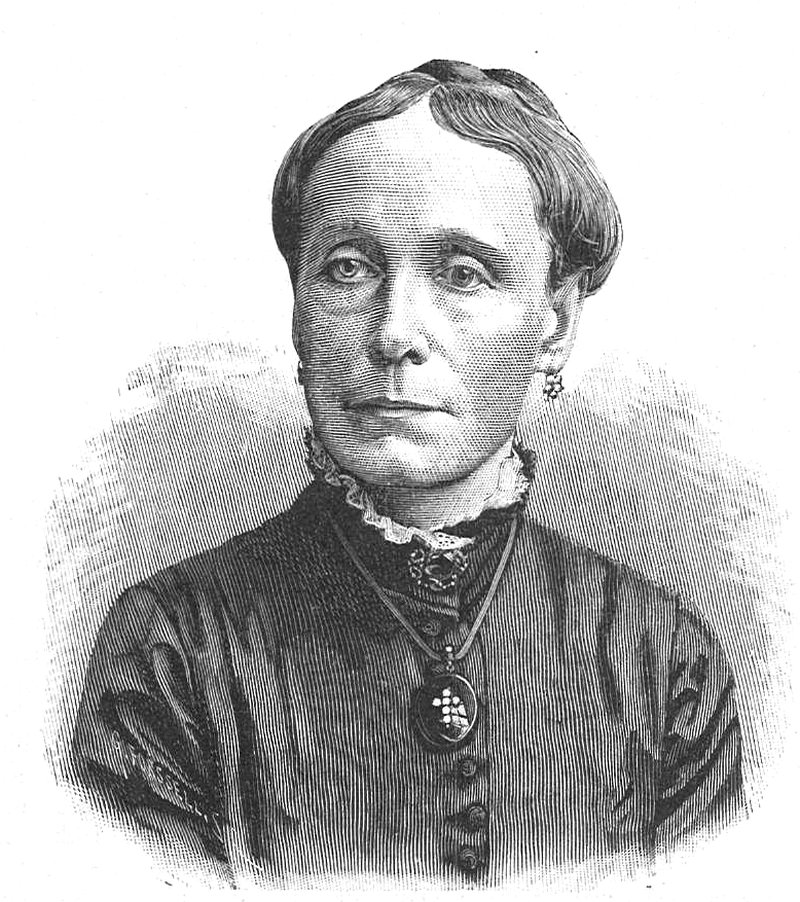
Portrait of Hanna Lindberg

Hanna Lindberg (28 August 1865 – 2 January 1951) was a Swedish municipal politician (liberal), feminist and milliner. She was the first woman in the Örebro city municipal council. Alongside the other women elected into various municipal councils in Sweden in the 1910 elections, she was also the first woman to be elected in a municipal council in Sweden.

Hanna Lindberg had been a Gofer and a milliner before she opened her own hat shop in 1891 and her own hat-factory, AB Lindberg Strå- & Filthattar (AB Lindberg Straw- and felthats) in 1898. She was active within the women's suffrage society, YMCA as well as the frisinnade föreningen (liberals). Being unmarried and thereby of legal majority, as well as wealthy, she had been able to vote for many years, under the voting law of 1862, before all genders became eligible to the municipal elections after the 1909 reform, and after the 1910 municipal elections, she was one of the women elected into local councils, becoming the first elected woman of her country.

Her installation in the communical council attracted attention as an historical event and was carefully described:

Red as a Peony in the face was Hanna Lindberg, when she for the first time entered the localitites of the city council, where the governor Tersmeden stood before the table of the chairman focused on the door, awaiting to receive the first woman in the city council. As soon as Hanna Lindberg appeared at the door, he met her and escorted her gallantly to her seat, which I had chosen for her in advance in the first line. He thereafter held an unusually warm welcome speech, despite his critical attitude toward the woman suffrage movement. During his installation of her among the "fathers", all remained standing.

Hanna Lindberg sat one full term, until 1914. In the city of Örebro, two more women sat in the council before the national women suffrage: Mathilda Tengwall in 1914–1920, and Amalia Lundgren as a temporary replacement in 1916.

== See also ==
- Kerstin Hesselgren
- Emilia Broomé
- Gertrud Månsson
