= Swedish Church Ordinance 1571 =

The Swedish Church Ordinance of 1571 was the first complete Swedish church order following the Swedish Reformation in the 1520s.

The main originator of the ordinance was archbishop Laurentius Petri. Petri, archbishop since 1531, had published many doctrinal texts. He had, in vain, tried to persuade kings Gustav Vasa and Eric to be allowed to publish a complete church ordinance. With the ascension of King John in 1568, Petri was granted permission, and in 1571 published Canon Ecclesiasticus. It was formalized at a church meeting in 1572.

Through the ordinance, all the fundamental Lutheran doctrines were written down and Catholic canon law formally lost its authority. Petri's work was however marked by a profound compromise between the old and the new. He altered the Catholic doctrines he believed were incompatible with true Christianity, but allowed others to remain if he deemed them useful. For example, the episcopate was retained, even though it was not directly dictated by the holy scripture, and prohibited degree of kinship was somewhat lessened, from the seventh to sixth degree of kinship. The Church Ordinance of 1571 also contained Eucharistic reservation.

The Swedish Church Ordinance of 1571 also proclaimed the need of a schooling system. To benefit trade, craftsmanship and commerce in the cities, the city inhabitants were to have schools for every city child, both boys and girls, to learn how to read, write and count as well as how to manage some kind of basic commercial skill. Girls as well as boys were to be included; no schools for girls were founded, but it became common for girls to be included in the city schools' first classes. The countryside had to wait for a school system to be established until the Swedish Church Law 1686.

== Aftermath ==
As useful as the ordinance was, it did not address the essential matter of a statement of faith. Petri planned on writing a declaration statement to the Augsburg Confession, but died shortly after, and the issue was not settled until the Uppsala Synod, 1593.

This ordinance was also altered by King John III of Sweden, who made several Catholic-inclined additions to it: the Nova Ordinantia of 1575, and his own church doctrine, the Röda boken ('Red Book') of 1576, two additions which introduced a middle stance between Catholicism and Protestantism, and reintroduced many Catholic customs. These were not reversed until the Uppsala Synod of 1593.

The Swedish Church Ordinance 1571 was succeeded by the Swedish Church Law 1686.

== Source text ==
- Den svenska kyrkoordningen 1571 jämte studier kring tillkomst, innehåll och användning published by Sven Kjöllerström, Lund 1971.
