= Emilia Broomé =

Swedish politician (1866–1925)

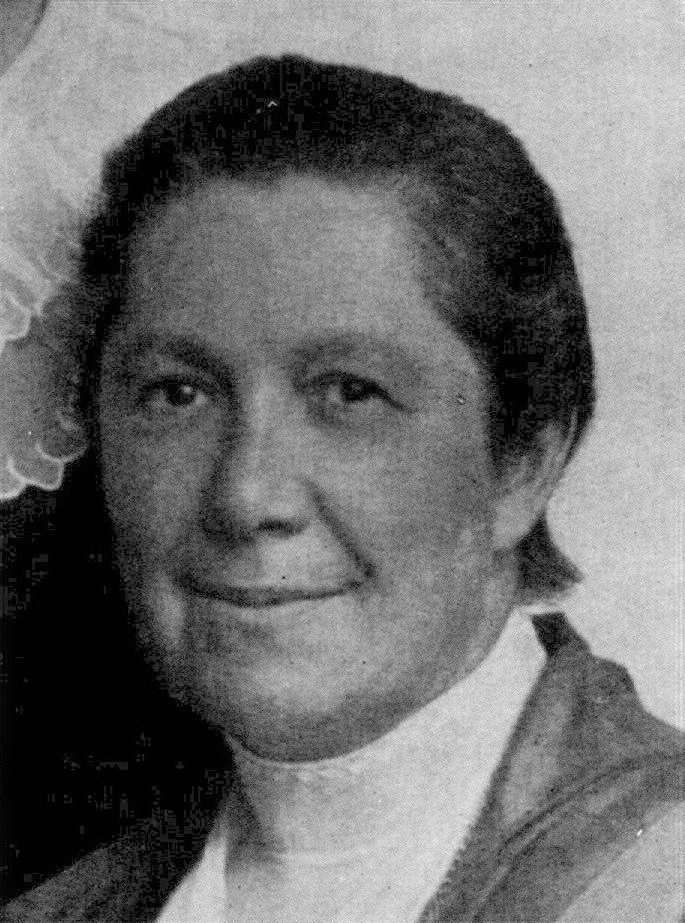
- Emilia Broomé in the early 20th century
- Born: Emilia Augusta Clementina Lothigius; 13 January 1866; Jönköping, Sweden
- Died: 2 June 1925 (aged 59); Stockholm, Sweden
- Occupations: Educator, politician
- Known for: First woman to be member of the Swedish legislative assembly (1914–1918).
- Spouse: Erik Ludvig Broomé (m. 1891; died 1893)
- Relatives: Gregori Aminoff (son-in-law)

Emilia Augusta Clementina Broomé (née Lothigius; 13 January 1866 – 2 June 1925) was a Swedish politician (liberal), feminist and peace activist. She was the first woman in the Swedish legislative assembly (1914).

== Life ==
Emilia Broomé was born on 13 October 1866 in Jönköping, raised in Jönköping, where she studied at the local girls school. She was given her professional degree at Wallinska skolan in 1883 and graduated in philosophy and medicine in Uppsala in 1884. She was thereafter employed as a teacher at Anna Whitlock's school in Stockholm.

She was the chairman of Stockholmsföreningen för kvinnans politiska rösträtt (the Stockholm division of the National Association for Women's Suffrage) from its foundation in 1902 until 1906. She was member of the board of directors of the Centralförbundet för Socialt Arbete (The Society for Social Welfare) from 1904 to 1925, and a member of the Stockholm Directorate of Education.

She was also chairman of Sveriges Kvinnliga Fredsförening (Women's Peace Association of Sweden) from the year she founded it in 1898 until it merged with the Swedish Peace Association in 1911, and acted as Sweden's representative at the international peace conference in The Hague in 1899.

Broomé was nominated for the Stockholm City Council in 1910 and in 1911. She was elected to the city council during the latter election and served from 1911 to 1924. She was chairman of the liberal women from 1917 to 1920.

Broomé was the first Swedish woman to have been a part of the Swedish state legislative committee (Lagberedningen), which prepared for new laws and in which she served as a member from 1914 to 1918. She took part in writing the reformed marriage law in 1920, in which men and women were made equal and married women were declared of legal majority; in the law of equal salary for men and women in 1921; and the law (Behörighetslagen) which granted women the right to all official professions in 1923.

== See also ==
- Hanna Lindberg
- List of peace activists

== Sources ==
- Ub.gu.se
- Ub.gu.se
- Historisktidskrift.se
- Barbro Hedvall (2011). Susanna Eriksson Lundqvist. red. Vår rättmätiga plats. Om kvinnornas kamp för rösträtt.. Förlag Bonnier. ISBN 978-91-7424-119-8
