= Civil Code of 1734 =

Code of law ratified by the Swedish riksdag

The Civil Code of 1734 (Swedish: 1734 års lag) was a code of law passed by the Swedish Riksdag of the Estates in 1734, and put in effect after it had been ratified by Frederick I of Sweden 23 January 1736. It became the foundation of the later civil code in Sweden – and remained so in Finland when annexed by the Russian Empire in 1809; though many alterations have been made in both Sweden and Finland since. The current Swedish Code of Statutes is founded on the civil code of 1734.

== Context ==
The Civil Code of 1734 replaced the previous Kristofers landslag ('The National Law of Christopher') passed by King Christopher of Bavaria in 1442, and the Stadslagen ('The City Law') from 1347–57.

It was the first civil code to apply the same law to all of Sweden. Previously, the Kristofers landslag referred to the Medieval Scandinavian law concerning the countryside, which could vary depending on the county, or the Stadslagen concerning the cities.

There was a need to establish a civil code and laws applying to all Sweden, both cities and countryside. The work with a national civil code begun during the Swedish Empire in 1686, although its completion was delayed during the Great Northern War. The Civil Code is therefore more influenced by the 17th-century Carolean age rather than the Age of Enlightenment or the Age of Liberty of the 1730s.

== Contents ==
It is divided into the following Books ( Swedish : "balkar" )

- The Book of Marriage
- The Book of Parents
- The Book of Inheritance
- The Book of Land
- The Book of Building
- The Book of Commerce
- The Book of Crimes
- The Book of Judicial Procedure
- The Book of execution of Judgments

== Translation ==
It was translated to the Finnish language in 1738, though not published in it until 1759.

== Sources ==
- Nationalencyklopedin (NE)
