= Sten Branzell =

Swedish architect

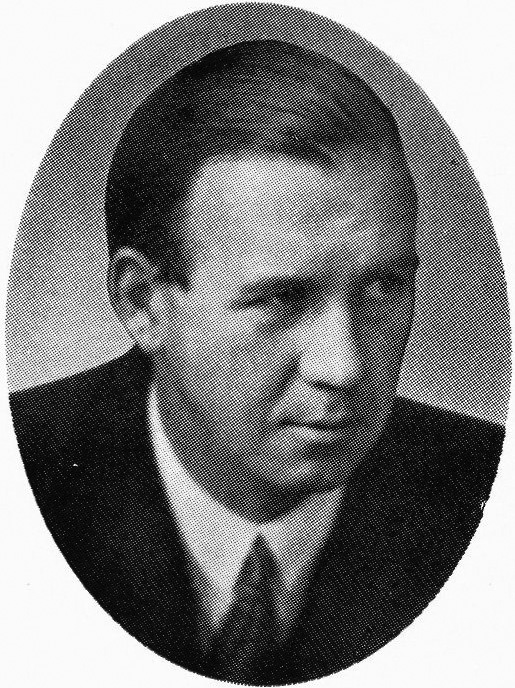
- Born: Sten Gunnar Branzell; August 27, 1893; Stockholm
- Died: May 4, 1959 (aged 65); Gothenburg
- Education: KTH Royal Institute of Technology
- Occupation: Architect

Sten Gunnar Branzell (August 27, 1893 – May 4, 1959) was a Swedish architect.

== Life and works ==
He studied in KTH Royal Institute of Technology and Royal Institute of Art. His sister was the famous singer Karin Brunzel.

In 1918, he joined the Swedish Brigade and participated in the Finnish Civil War, where he was slightly wounded. In Finland, he met Alvar Aalto, who was living with Branzel's family when Aalto traveled to Sweden. Brunzel created furniture for Nordiska Kompaniet and was the artistic designer of Costa Buda in the 1920s.

Brunzel was the city architect of Gothenburg from 1944 to 1957.
