= Siri Derkert =

Swedish artist and sculptor (1888–1973)

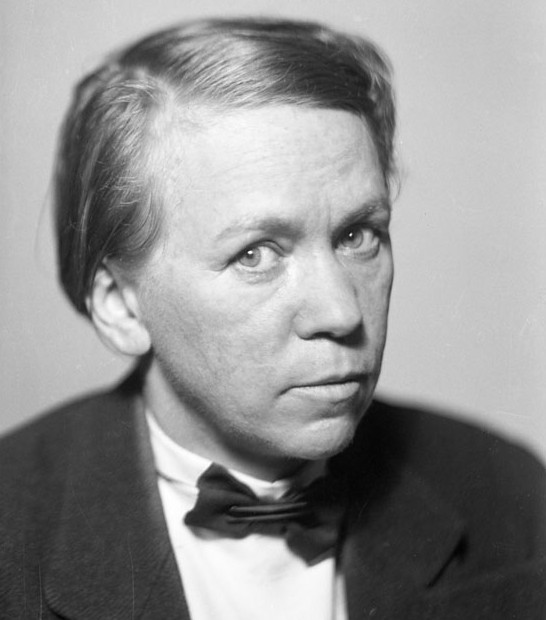
- Siri Derkert in the 1940s
- Born: Siri Karin Derkert; August 30, 1888; Stockholm, Sweden
- Died: April 28, 1973 (aged 84); Lidingö, Sweden
- Resting place: Lidingö churchyard 59°21′58.81″N 18°9′32.22″E
- Education: Royal Institute of Art; Académie Colarossi; Académie de la Grande Chaumière
- Known for: Public art in Stockholm
- Notable work: Ristningar i betong
- Style: Expressionism
- Spouses: Valle Rosenberg; Bertil Lybeck
- Website: siri.derkert.com

Siri Karin Derkert (30 August 1888 – 28 April 1973) was a Swedish artist and sculptor. She was also a strong advocate for peace, feminism and environmental issues.

== Life and education ==
Derkert was born on 30 August 1888 in the parish of Adolf Fredrik Church in Stockholm. She was one of seven children of merchant Carl Edward Johansson Derkert and Emma Charlotta Valborg, born Fogelin. She received her first artistic education at the Caleb Althin school of art in Stockholm, where she started in 1904. She went on to the Royal Institute of Art in 1911–13. Fellow students included Annie Bergman, Elsa Björkman-Goldschmidt, Harriet Löwenhjelm, Ragnhild Nordensten, Gerda Nordling, and Elvi Tondén.

In 1913, Derkert moved to Paris where she studied at the Académie Colarossi and the Académie de la Grande Chaumière together with Swedish sculptors Ninnan Santesson and Lisa Bergstrand, until the start of World War I in the autumn of 1914. In February 1914, the three friends spent five weeks in Algiers where Derkert was introduced to more vibrant and bolder colour schemes. During and after the war she spent some time in Italy, where her first child Carlo was born. Derkert was also a student at the Kvinnliga medborgarskolan vid Fogelstad (Fogelstad Citizen School for Women) where she arrived in September 1943. The stay proved inspirational for her later works. She made several sketches of the women in charge of the school, among them Honorine Hermelin and Ada Nilsson.

Derkert had three children: a son Carlo (1915–1994) with Finnish artist Valle Rosenberg and daughters Liv (1917–38) and Sara (born 1920) with Swedish illustrator Bertil Lybeck. Derkert was married to Lybeck in 1921–25, but they did not live together.

Siri Derkert died on 28 April 1973 in Lidingö, and is buried in the Lidingö churchyard.

== Artistic career ==
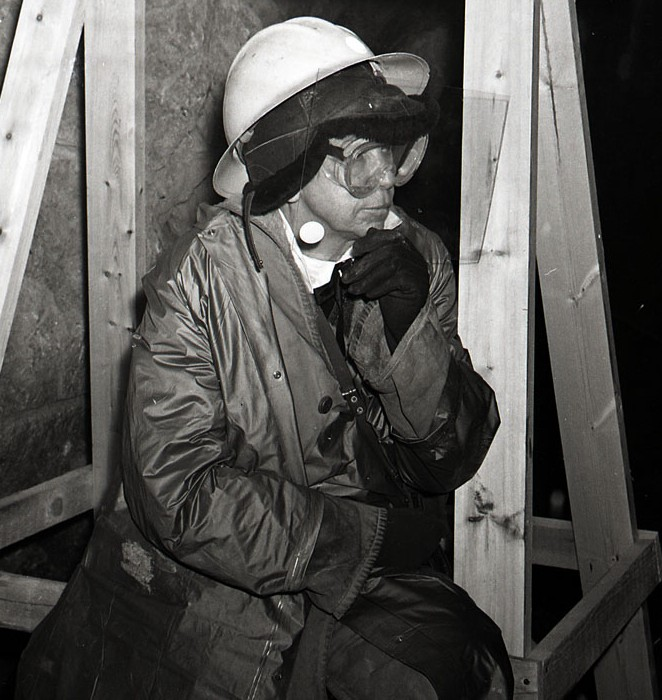
Derkert working on the carvings in the Östermalmstorg metro station

Derkert is known as an artist with a strong personal and Expressionistic style. In her early works, particularly from her time in Paris, elements of both Cubism and Fauvism can be found. She made paintings of figures in grayscale, mostly using pastels as well as paintings of interiors and portraits of children. During the 1910s, she worked as a fashion illustrator. It was not until the 1940s, that she made her breakthrough in the art community. This also coincided with her new political engagement in the peace movement and feministic issues.

Siri Derkert designed fashion plates, fashion collections and designed costumes during the 1910s and early 1920s. Cubism and modernism was reflected in her designs with geometric shapes and patterns made from the layering of fabric and stringing of beads and pearls to create square and rectangular shapes. The pearls and rich colors she used reflected oriental and Egyptian influence in her costumes as well. At this time Russian Ballet had a heavy influence on fashion design and inspired an avant-garde dance show she participated in producing in 1917. The dance show was produced in a theater in Stockholm known as the Intiman, with the collaboration of the artist Anna Petrus, Märta Kuylenstierna, and her sister Sonja Derkert. Together they combined many art forms into a Gesamtkunstwerk using dance, costumes, music, and scenery. Though they never created a sequel, the costumes received recognition and compliments. These costumes were designed at a school for training dressmakers known as the Birgittaskolan, where Derkert produced two collections per year. Siri Derkert herself wore men's bohemian style clothing including men's trousers. This was common amongst women artists at this time to emphasize modernity and liberation.

She became known to a greater audience when she was asked to do the art in the Östermalmstorg station of the Stockholm Metro. Since the station was designed to serve as a shelter in case of a nuclear war, Derkert filled the walls with messages of peace, feminism and notes from revolutionary songs. When her exhibition Rörelser i alla riktningar ("Movements in all directions"), opened in April 1960, she became the first woman to hold a solo exhibition at the Moderna Museet in Stockholm.

Derkert's work is represented at the Nationalmuseum, Moderna Museet, Museum of Sketches for Public Art and Gothenburg Museum of Art. Her work can also be found on a stamp issued by the Swedish postal service in 1982, to commemorate the 100th anniversary of Elin Wägner.

== Political engagement ==
She was an ardent advocate for peace, feminism and environmental issues. This commitment started in the early 1940s and grew during the rise of the Swedish peace movement in the 1950s, when Derkert became leader of the Stockholm section of the Svenska Kvinnors Vänsterförbund (the Swedish Women's Left-wing Association). At the time the Swedish Security Service monitored all participants in that new movement and consequently her activities were meticulously recorded in their files.

When Apollo 11 landed on the moon in 1969, the Swedish Radio invited some noted Swedes to comment on the event during the broadcast. Derkert was chosen to speak along with former leader of the Communist Party of Sweden C.-H. Hermansson and archbishop Ruben Josefson.

She has been described by Martin Gustavsson as a "bird loving motorcycle-Marxist".

== Awards ==
She was awarded the Prince Eugen Medal in 1960, and in July the same year she received the Guggenheim International Award of US$1,000 for her painting Fågel i topp ("Bird on top").

== Public art – a selection ==
- Kvinnopelaren ("Women's pillar"), upper platform, T-Centralen metro station in Stockholm, carvings in concrete (1956–1958)
- Ristningar i naturbetong ("Carvings in concrete"), Östermalmstorg metro station in Stockholm, sandblasted concrete (1962–1964)
- Vi – We – Nous, Hersby high school in Lidingö, Stockholm, tapestry (1962)
- Sverigeväggen ("Swedish wall"), on the House of Sweden, Kungsträdgården in Stockholm, relief/carving in concrete and stainless steel (1967)
- Ren luft – rent vatten ("Clean air – clean water"), Gullingeskolan in Tensta, sculpture in aluminum (1968–1972)
- Senapsträdet och himmelens fåglar ("The mustard tree and the birds of heaven"), Skövde kulturhus, public library, reliefs in concrete (1959–1969)
- A series of concrete slabs with carvings outside the Stockholm International Fairs

== Gallery ==
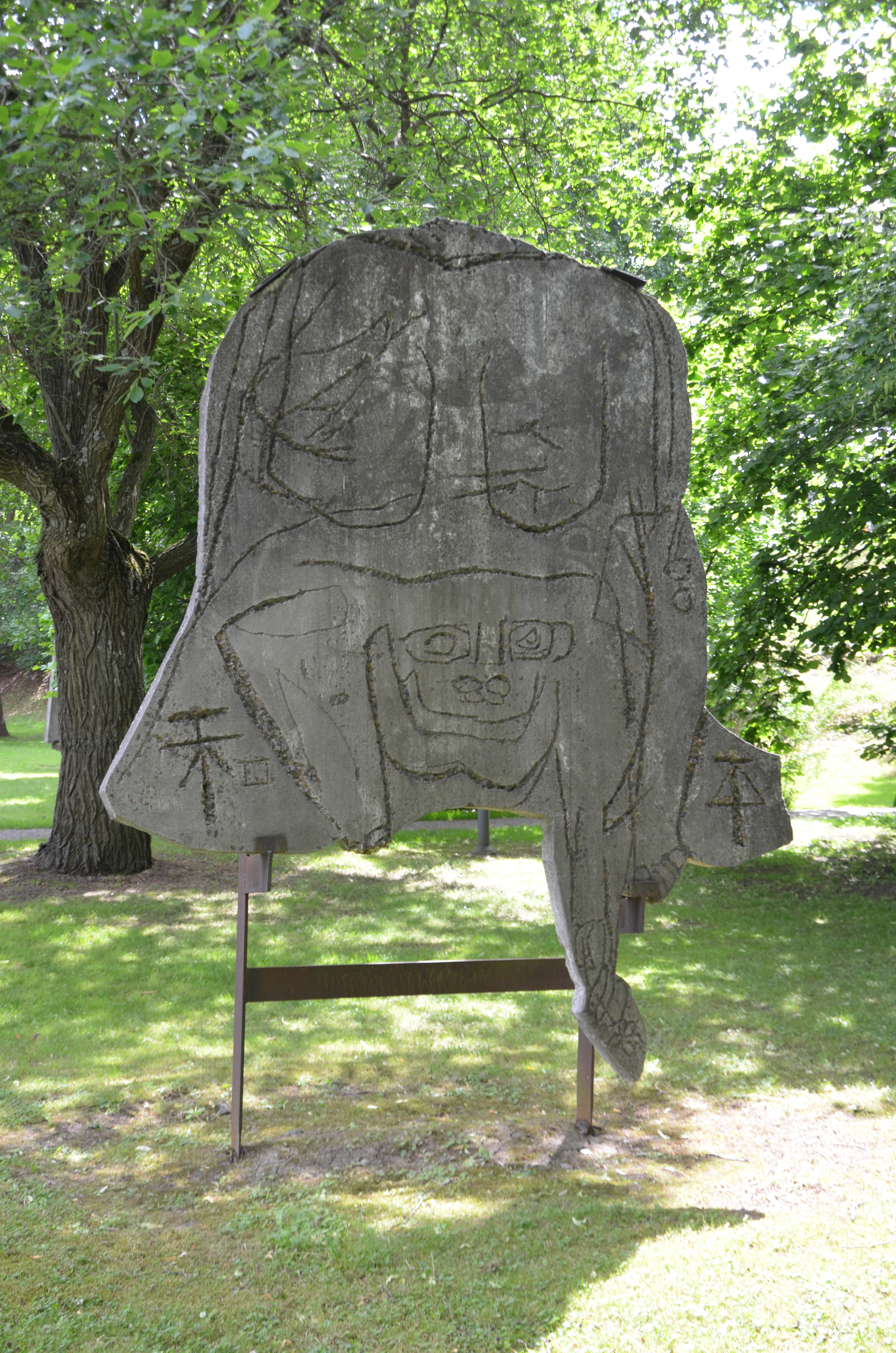
One of the slabs outside the Stockholm International Fairs

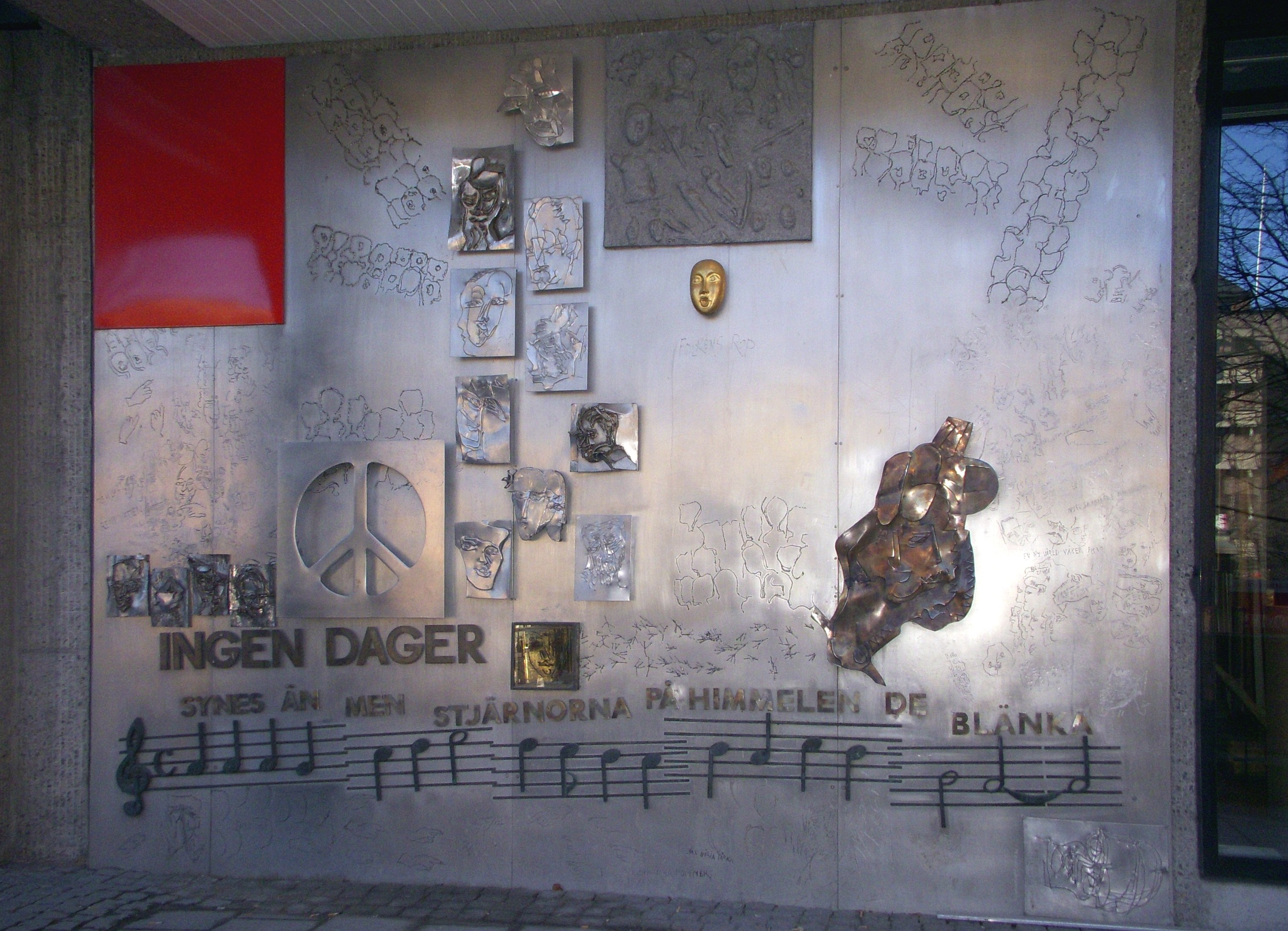
Sverigeväggen ("Swedish wall"), on the House of Sweden

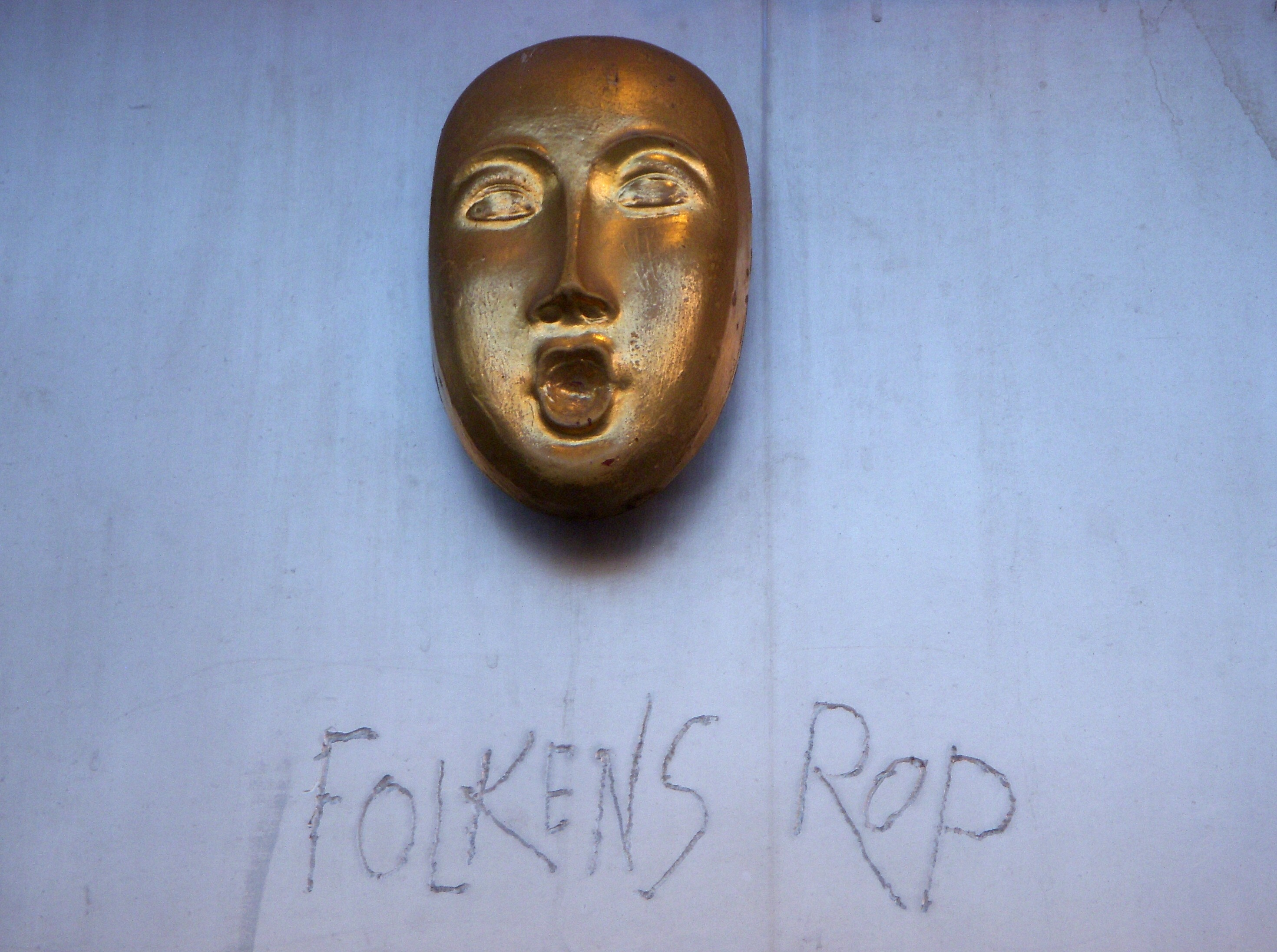
Sverigeväggen (detail) – Folkens rop ("Cry of the people")

== See also ==
- List of peace activists
