= Herta Svensson =

Swedish educator, social worker, and personnel consultant

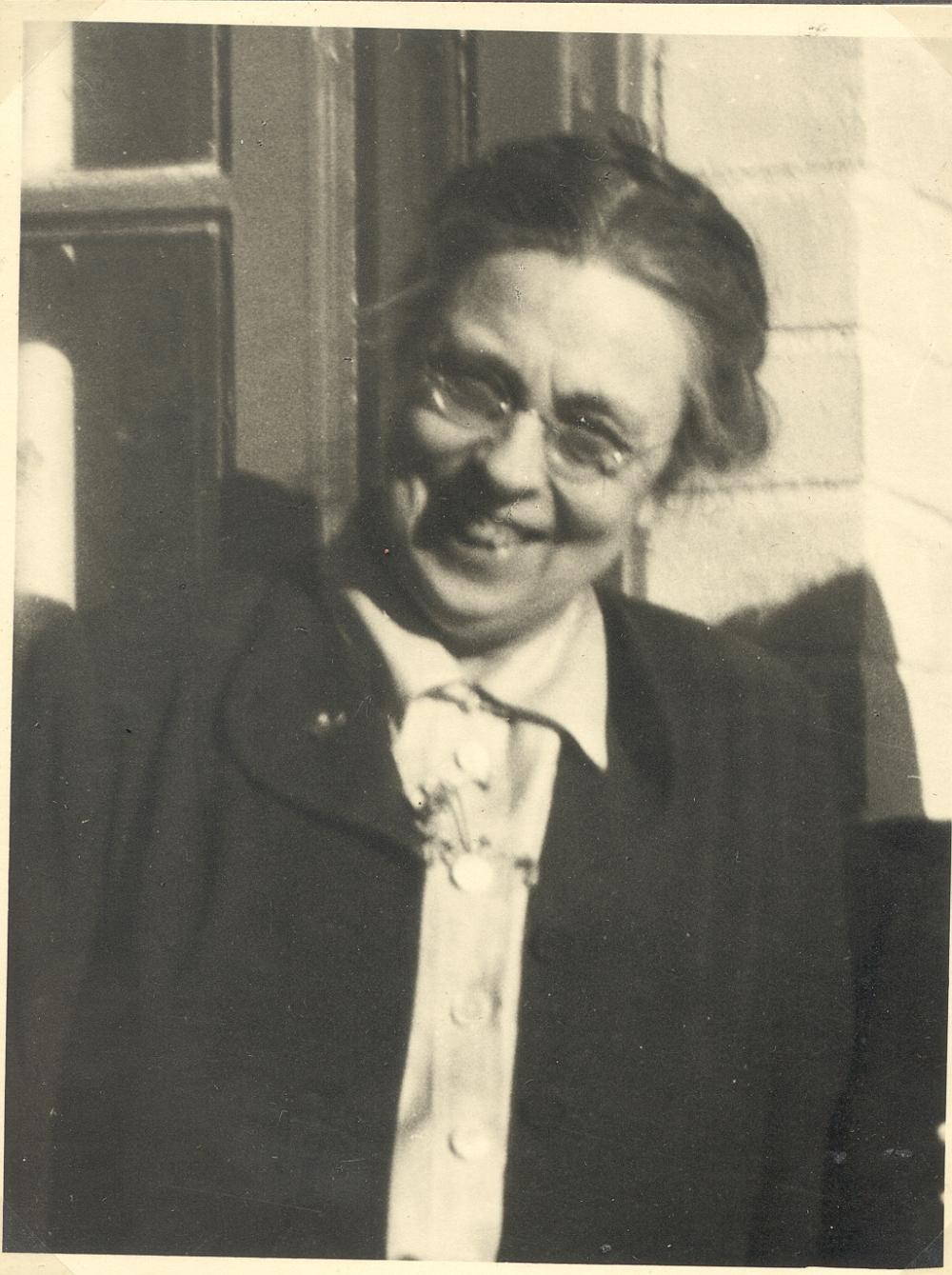
Herta Svensson

Herta Elisabet Svensson (1886–1981) was a Swedish educator, social worker, and personnel consultant. She was an important figure in the history of social work and settlement movement in Sweden, and was part of the initiative that established the country's first settlement house Birkagården in 1912. In 1921, she became the first person in Sweden to hold the title "personnel consultant". While working for the Svenska tobaksmonopolet, she actively volunteered to uplift the living conditions of workers and established a convalescent home in Värmland.

== Life ==
Herta Svensson was born on 21 April 1886 in Simrishamn, Sweden. She was the only child of Gustaf Svensson, a business, and his wife Amanda Elisabeth Olsson. Her father left their family home when she was young, and she was brought up by her mother. She attended the Privata högre lärarinneseminariet school in Stockholm, and in 1908, became a governess to Natanael and Elsa Beskow in Djursholm. She subsequently became a teacher at the middle school Djursholms samskola, where Natanael Beskow worked as the principal, and later at the Örnsköldsviks folkhögskola, a folk high school. In connection to the settlement movement, she was heavily involved in the initiative to establish Sweden's first Hemgård Birkagården, alongside Beskow. The latter served as the director since its inception.

Svensson was involved in the proposal to connect female students and female workers. The petition was granted and summer camps for children from working-class families were established, thus showing the needs of working-class women for recreational time. It eventually became a principal debate for "stugrörelsen", a Stockholm-based network through which Svensson met her contemporaries Kerstin Hesselgren, Honorine Hermelin, and Ida Fischer. On Hesselgren's recommendation, Svensson was appointed as "fabrikssyster" (factory matron) at the tobacco firm Svenska tobaksmonopolet in 1916. As a "fabrikssyster", she was responsible for looking after the social conditions of the workers. The post was later renamed as "personalkonsulent" (personnel consultant), making Svenson the first person in Sweden to hold the title. She worked towards improving the company's social engagement, including canteens, camps for children, day-care centres, settlements, and convalescent homes. She was concerned about the welfare of tobacco workers, and visited the homes of ill workers. To provide better living opportunities to the workers, she established a rehabilitation centre at Vikersvik in Värmland. The centre was later shifted to the Rockesholm manor. She established Södergården, Stockholm, a settlement which provided several courses and leisure opportunities. She managed the enterprise while Svenska Tobaksmonopolet was responsible for its rent.

Svensson was member of the Association of Social Workers in Industry and Business – Socialarbetare inom industri och affärsvärld (SAIA), and the International Industrial Relations Institute (IRI). She subsequently served on the board of trustees at the Kvinnliga medborgarskolan vid Fogelstad in Fogelstad. She was awarded the medal Illis quorum in 1936.

Svensson died in Stockholm, on 19 October 1981.
