= Elsa Björkman-Goldschmidt =

Swedish artist & writer (1888–1982)

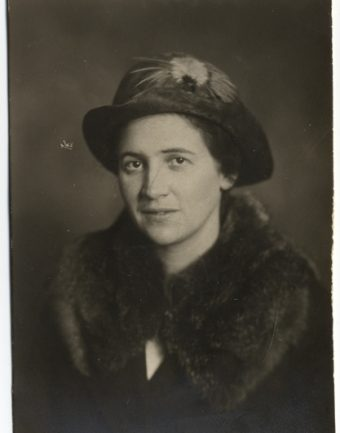
- Born: Elsa Andrea Elisabeth Björkman; 16 April 1888; Linköping, Sweden
- Died: 6 April 1982 (aged 93); Stockholm, Sweden
- Occupations: Artist, writer
- Spouse: Waldemar Goldschmidt (m. 1921)

Elsa Andrea Elisabeth Björkman-Goldschmidt (16 April 1888 – 6 April 1982) was a Swedish artist and writer who was active in Sweden and Austria. After attending Stockholm's Art Academy, she worked as an engraver and etcher. In 1916, while assisting the Red Cross in Russia, she met her future husband, the Austrian surgeon Waldemar Goldschmidt. They married in Vienna where she was involved with Save the Children and started working as a correspondent for the Swedish press. In 1938, anti-Semitism forced the couple to move to Sweden where she published a number of books about her life in Vienna.

== Early life and education ==
Born in Linköping on 16 April 1888, Elsa Andrea Elisabeth Björkman-Goldschmidt was the daughter of Maria (née Heyman), who was Jewish and army officer Daniel Magnus Fredrik Björkman. Childhood friends included Elsa Brändström and Honorine Hermelin. After attending a teacher training course at the Anna Sandström Seminary in Stockholm (1906–1908), she travelled abroad to improve her language skills. She then spent a year at the Royal Swedish Academy of Fine Arts concentrating on etching, woodcut and lithography (1909–1910). Fellow students included Annie Bergman, Siri Derkert, Harriet Löwenhjelm, Ragnhild Nordensten, Gerda Nordling, and Elvi Tondén. She spent a further year studying graphic arts in Belgium, making study trips to Italy and Germany. She presented her work at exhibitions in Sweden and abroad.

== Nursing and the Red Cross ==
In 1916, she travelled to Russia with her humanitarian friend Elsa Brändström to work an as untrained nurse in the Siberian prisoner-of-war camps. She returned to Russia a number of times in subsequent years as a delegate of the Swedish Red Cross, experiencing the Russian Revolution.

She met her husband-to-be, the Austrian Jewish surgeon Waldemar Goldschmidt, in a Moscow hospital.

== Interwar ==
After marrying in Vienna in 1921, they settled there and Elsa Björkman-Goldschmidt turned increasingly from art to writing, contributing columns to the Swedish daily Dagens Nyheter. Björkman-Goldschmidt was heavily involved in the work of Save the Children in Austria in the aftermath of the First World War. In 1938, when after the Nazis annexed Austria, as Jews the Björkman-Goldschmidts were forced to return to Sweden. The couple became involved in various cultural associations in Stockholm, including the literary society Samfundet De Nio and the women's association Nya Idun.

== Writings ==
Björkman-Goldschmidt wrote accounts of her years in Vienna in a series of books published from the 1940s. Titles included Det var i Wien (1944), Donaurapsodi (1945), Wien vaknar (1949) and Följ med till Wien (1959). Excepts have been translated into German by the historian Renate Schreiber and published in 1982 as Es geschah in Wien. Erinnerungen von Elsa Björkman-Goldschmidt.

Elsa Björkman-Goldschmidt died in Stockholm on 6 April 1982.
