= Annie Bergman =

Swedish artist (1889–1987)

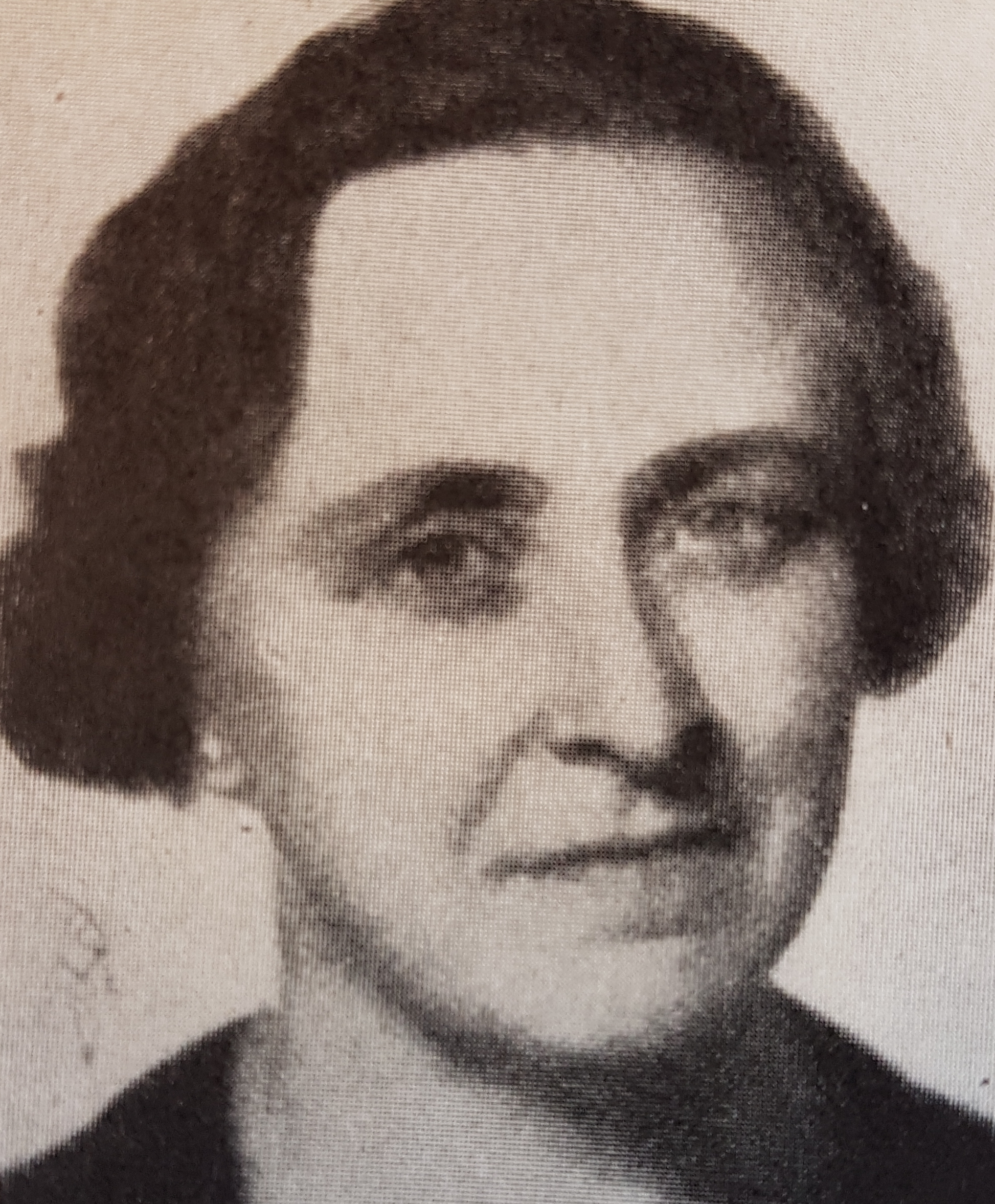
- Born: 15 December 1889; Liège, Belgium
- Died: 11 January 1987 (aged 97); Stockholm
- Citizenship: Swedish
- Education: Royal Institute of Art
- Occupations: Artist, writer, and children's book author

Annie Bergman (15 December 1889 – 11 January 1987) was a Swedish artist, writer, and children's book author.

== Early life and education ==
Annie Bergman was born on 15 December 1889 in Liège, Belgium to Ingeborg Billquist and William Bergman. Her mother was from Gothenburg and was artistic. Her father was an artillery lieutenant who invented and produced weapons in the late nineteenth century. The Bergman family spent a short time in Paris then moved to Stockholm, William Bergman's home town.

Bergman finished secondary education in 1907, then undertook preparatory art courses at Tekniska skolan and at Caleb Althin's painting school. Both parents encouraged her interest in art and supported her choice of career. In 1908 she began a four-year course of study at Royal Institute of Art, Stockholm. She studied alongside Elsa Björkman-Goldschmidt, Siri Derkert, Harriet Löwenhjelm, Ragnhild Nordensten, Gerda Nordling, and Elvi Tondén. Her tutors included Axel Jungstedt for figure drawing and Oskar Björk for painting. She studied graphic art and etching with Axel Tallberg. Bergman began to specialise in aquatints and etched landscapes.

== Career ==
On graduating, in 1913 Bergman travelled to Italy, via Germany, studying art in museums in the major cities. She spent a year in Italy, touring the country and spending time in Florence, Sienna, Rome and Naples. The life of the cities, villages and landscapes had a significant impact upon her later woodcuts. Bergman moved to Paris in early 1914, taking classes at the Académie de la Grand Chaumière, but returned to Sweden with the outbreak of the First World War.

In 1917 Bergman stopped producing copper engravings and instead began to print woodcuts. Postwar she visited Spain in 1921. Bergman painted in oil and watercolour as well as making woodcuts, often with landscapes, figures and motifs from Italy. Today she is best known and appreciated for her exquisite floral motifs in woodcuts and linocuts. She developed a series of theatre caricatures in the 1920s and wrote and illustrated of her own fairy tale books, inspired by telling stories to her nieces and nephews.

In 1929 Bergman started her "card factory", creating linoleum prints for Christmas and other occasional cards. She printed these with a spoon on thin paper and then mounted them on cardboard. The card were commercially successful and she bought a printing press, selling the cards at paper and art shops nationwide. The business eventually became very successful, selling woodcuts and linocuts of flowers, with some Japanese influences. Reproductions were printed in journals and by the Föreningen för Grafisk Konst (The Swedish Fine Art Print Society). Five of her pictures of flowers were the basis for the Nordiska vildblommor stamp set issued by the Postverket in 1968.

Bergman was a member of the cultural organisation Nya Idun and, in collaboration with Ida von Plomgren, wrote several plays for members to perform including a Mozart parody Figges bröllop in 1933 and Den gudomliga äppelkompotten in 1935 for the organisation's 50th anniversary.

== Legacy ==
Annie Bergman's work is held the collections of a number of international museums: the Nationalmuseum of Sweden, the Swedish Museum of Performing Arts (Scenkonstmuseet) in Stockholm, the Albertina Museum in Vienna, the Musée des Arts Décoratifs, Paris and the Centre de la gravure et de l'image imprimée in Brussels.

Annie Bergman died on 11 January 1987 in Stockholm age 97.
