= Kinberg =

Kinberg is a Swedish toponymic surname, with origins from Kinner estate in Sil Socken, Gotland, or Kinne Hundred in Västergötland. An Ashkenazi Jewish ornamental surname of unrelated origin also exists, from the German words for pine (kien) + mountain (berg). Notable persons with the surname Kinberg include:

- Anna Kinberg Batra, a Swedish politician and leader of the Moderate Party
- Johan Gustaf Hjalmar Kinberg, a Swedish zoologist, physician and veterinarian
- Julia Kinberg (1874–1945), Swedish physician and feminist
- Simon Kinberg, an English-born American screenwriter and film producer
