= Medical Women's International Association =

Non-governmental organization

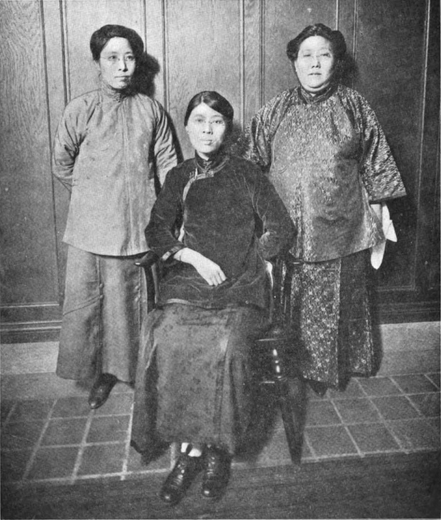
Dr. Li Bi Leu, Dr. Dau Se Zals, Dr. Ida Kahn (l-r) at the First International Conference of Medical Women (1919)

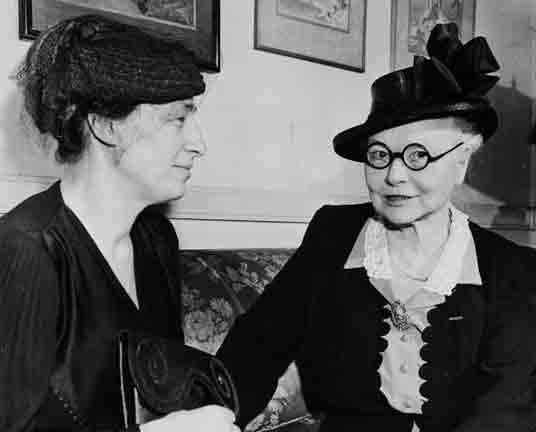
The 1948 chairperson Anna Charlotte Ruys (left) with the founding ex-chair Esther Pohl Lovejoy (right)

The Medical Women's International Association is a non-governmental organization founded in 1919 with the purpose of representing female physicians worldwide. Esther Lovejoy was its first president. The Association grew from an international meeting of medical women attending a YWCA meeting in America and a group of medical women in Britain, notably Dr Jane Walker. Dr. Ida Kahn was one of the Chinese representatives at the International Conference of Women Physicians (1919).

== Congress of Medical Women ==
In 1954, the International Association of Medical Women promoted the realization of the first Congress of Medical Women, its president Ada Chree Reid visited Madrid and Barcelona, in this city she was received by the gynecologist Marina Soliva Corominas and a group of Catalan female doctors.

== Notable members ==
=== Presidents ===
- Dr Esther Pohl Lovejoy (USA, 1919-1924)
- Lady Florence Barrett (UK, 1924-1929)
- Dr Lasthénie Thuillier-Landry (1929-1934)
- Dr Alma Sundquist (1934-1937)
- Dr Louisa Martindale (UK, 1937-)
- Dr Charlotte Ruys (Netherlands, 1947-1950)
- Dr Ada Chree-Reid (USA, 1950-1954)
- Dr Jolanda Tosoni-Dalai (Italy, 1954-1958)
- Dr Marion Hilliard (president-elect, died before being able to take office)
- Dr Janet Aitken (UK, 1958-1962)
- Fe del Mundo (Philippines, 1962-1966)
- Lore Antoine (Austria, 1966-1968)
- Lorna Lloyd-Green (Australia, 1968-1970)
- Leone McGregor Hellstedt (Sweden, 1970-1972)
- Alma Dea Morani (USA, 1972-1974)
- Harumi Ono (Japan, 1974-1976)
- Helga Thieme (Germany, 1976-1978)
- Beryl Corner (UK, 1976-1980)
- Joan Redshaw (Australia, 1980-1982)
- Trinidad A. Gomez (Philippines, 1982-1984)
- Beverly Tamboline (Canada, 1984-1987)
- Fernanda de Beneditti-Venturini (Italy, 1987-1989)

=== Vice-presidents ===
- Grete Albrecht (Germany, 1958 to 1963)
