= Ada Nilsson =

Swedish doctor (1872–1964)

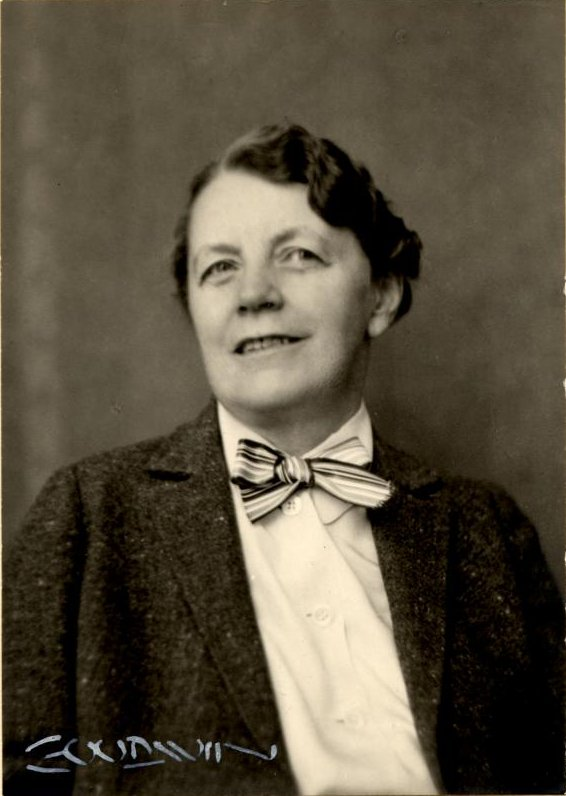
- Born: 21 September 1872; Södra Säms
- Died: 23 May 1964 (aged 91); Julita

Ada Konstantia Nilsson (21 September 1872 – 23 May 1964) was an early Swedish woman medical doctor. She was one of the founders of the campaigning magazine Tidevarvet in 1923.

== Early life and education ==
Nilsson was born in Södra Säms in 1872. She was brought up in a farmhouse. Her father, who helped to run the textile workers cottage industry, died when she was thirteen and she went to live in Stockholm. In 1891 she was one of the first women to take medical training, initially in Uppsala and mainly in Stockholm. She met Lydia Wahlström and Alma Sundquist who were also female pioneers.

== Career ==
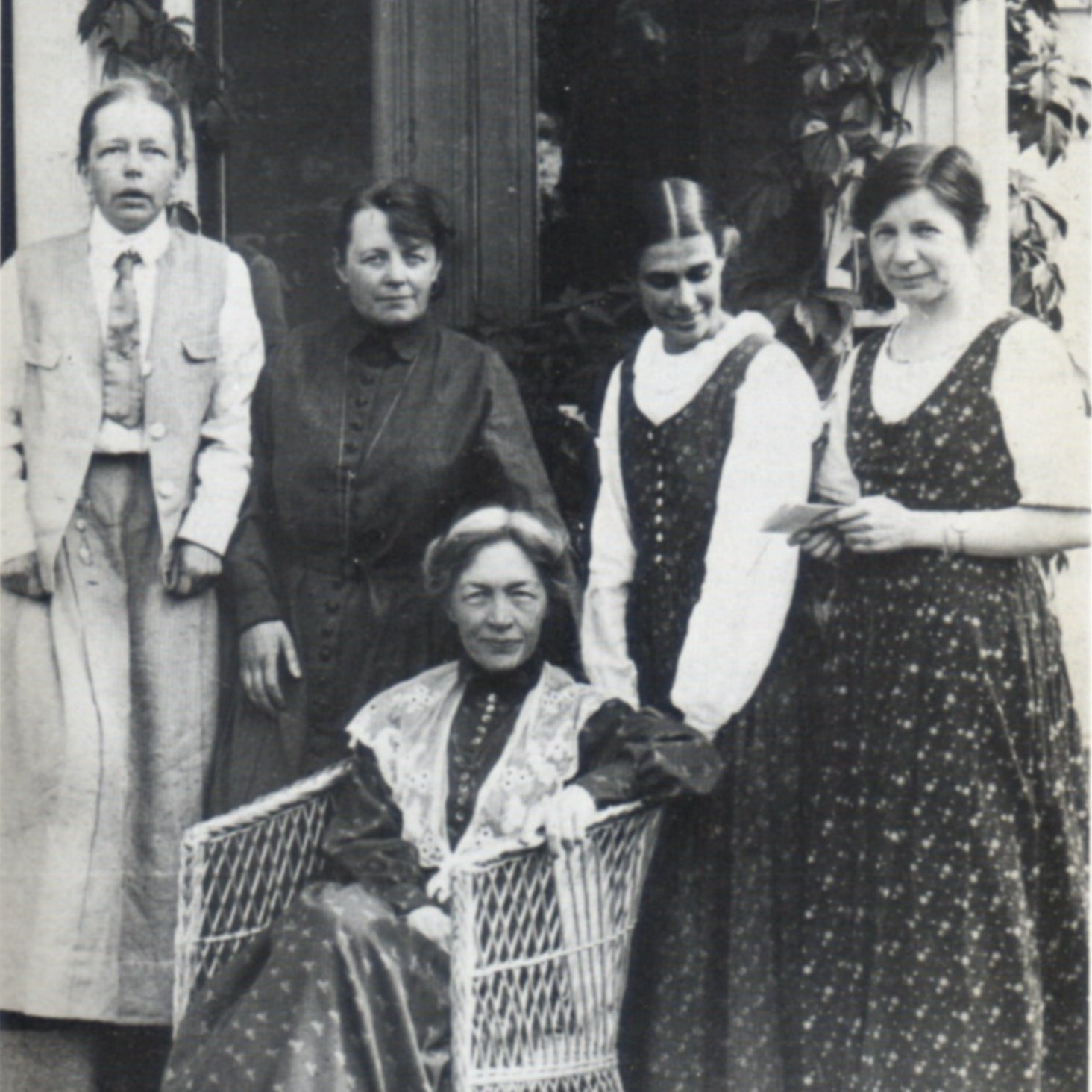
1920s Left to right: Elisabeth Tamm, Ada Nilsson, Kerstin Hesselgren (sitting), Honorine Hermelin and Elin Wägner

Nilsson and Julia Kinberg, another physician, founded a feminist organization, Frisinnade Kvinnor, in 1914. She was a member of the Liberal Women's National Association.

The magazine Tidevarvet was founded in 1923 by Kerstin Hesselgren, educator Honorine Hermelin, Ada Nilsson, Elisabeth Tamm, a liberal politician, and Elin Wägner, an author. The founders had a liberal political stance and were known as the Fogelstad group. Nilsson was one of the principal funders of the project and became editor-in-chief with her new friend Elin Wägner as its first editor. The magazine was to publish until 1936 and for three years (1925-28) the magazine ran a free consultancy but it was difficult to fund.

Nilsson met Aleksandra Kollontaj, a Russian diplomat and later ambassador to Sweden in the early 1930s. Nilsson cared for Kollontaj when her health started to decline and their correspondence is extant.

== Private life and death ==
Nilsson had a very close relationship with Honorine Hermelin. During the last year of her life Nilsson went to stay at Fogelstad with Hermelin. Nilsson died in Julita. She was near blind and poor. She was buried in a cemetery near her birthplace. Her life is one of those celebrated in Stockholm's Östermalmstorg metro station by Siri Derkert.
