= August Tamm =

Swedish politician (1840–1905)

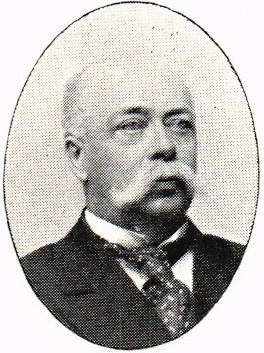

Member of the Riksdag's First Chamber
- In office 1900–1905

Personal details
- Born: 18 June 1840 Stafby, Uppsala County
- Died: 30 January 1905 (aged 64) Fogelstad, Katrineholm Municipality
- Children: Elisabeth Tamm

Carl August Tamm (8 June 1840 – 30 January 1905), was a Swedish politician, landowner and rittmeister.

August Tamm was born at Stafby, Uppsala County. Tamm was a member of the Riksdag's First Chamber from 1900 to 1905.

Tamm married Baroness Emma Åkerhielm af Margretelund in 1872.
