= Elisabeth Tamm =

Swedish politician and women's rights activist

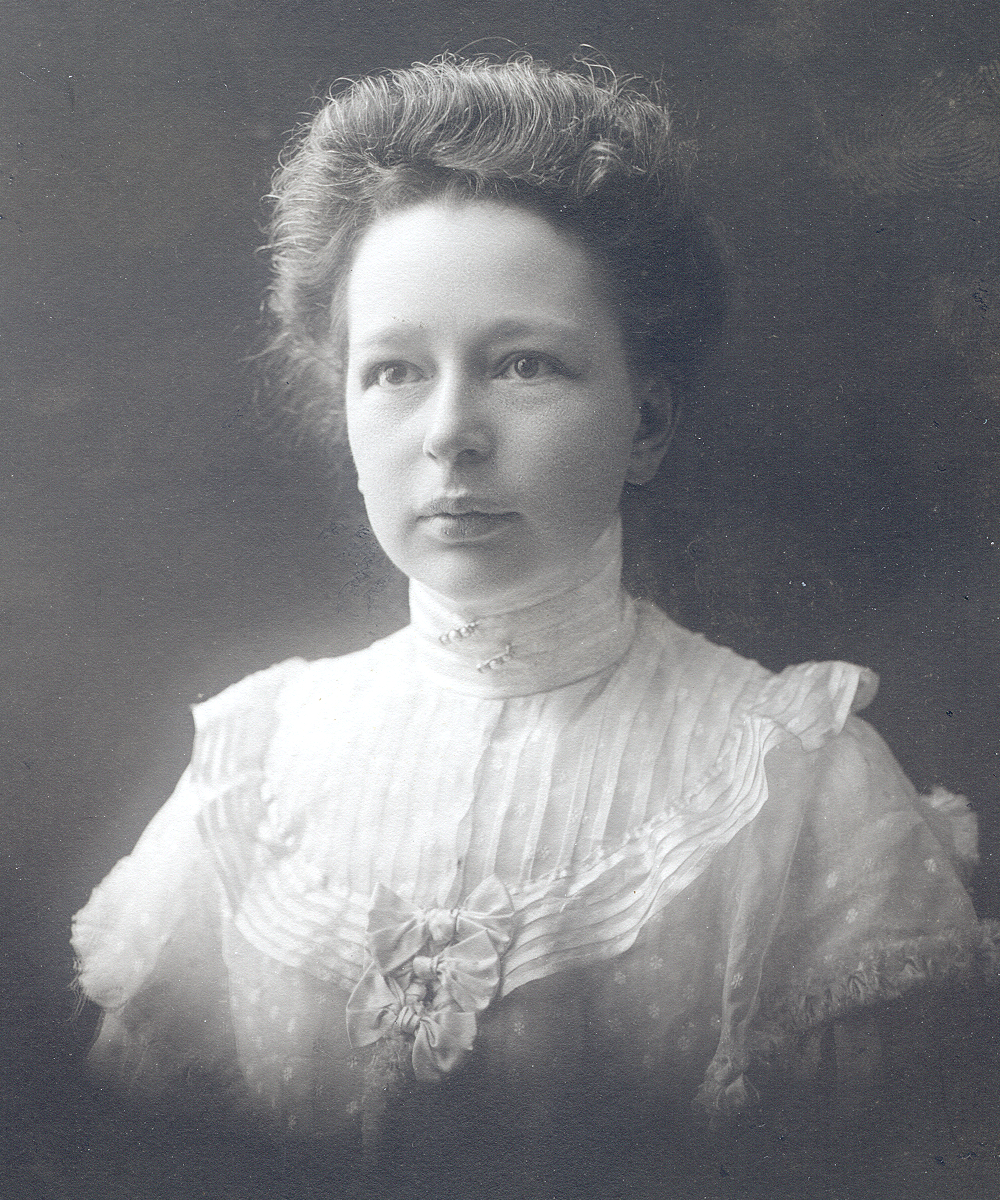

member of the Parliament of Sweden
- In office 1921–1924

municipal communal speaker for Julita
- In office 1933–1936

member of the board of directors of the city council
- In office 1919–1931

chair of the Communal Council of Julita
- In office 1916

deputy chairman of the Communal Council of Julita
- In office 1913

Personal details
- Born: 30 June 1880 Fogelstad, Julita, Sweden
- Died: 23 September 1958 (aged 78)
- Party: Liberal; Independent (from 1924)
- Parent: August Tamm (father)
- Occupation: politician and activist

Elisabeth Tamm (30 June 1880, at the manor Fogelstad in Julita, Södermanlands län – 23 September 1958) was a Swedish liberal politician and women's rights activist. She was known in the parliament as Tamm i Fogelstad ('Tamm of Fogelstad').

== Life ==
She was the eldest daughter and heiress of the Parliamentarian and landowner August Tamm and Baroness Emma Åkerhielm af Margrethelund. She and her sister Märta were schooled at home by a governess, and were also instructed by their father in managing an estate. Elisabeth attended lectures at Uppsala University; however, in 1905 she inherited Fogelstad Manor from her father, and abandoned her plans to study in order to attend to her estate. She never married.

Her father being a politician, Tamm showed an early interest in politics and the growing women's movement.

=== Political career ===
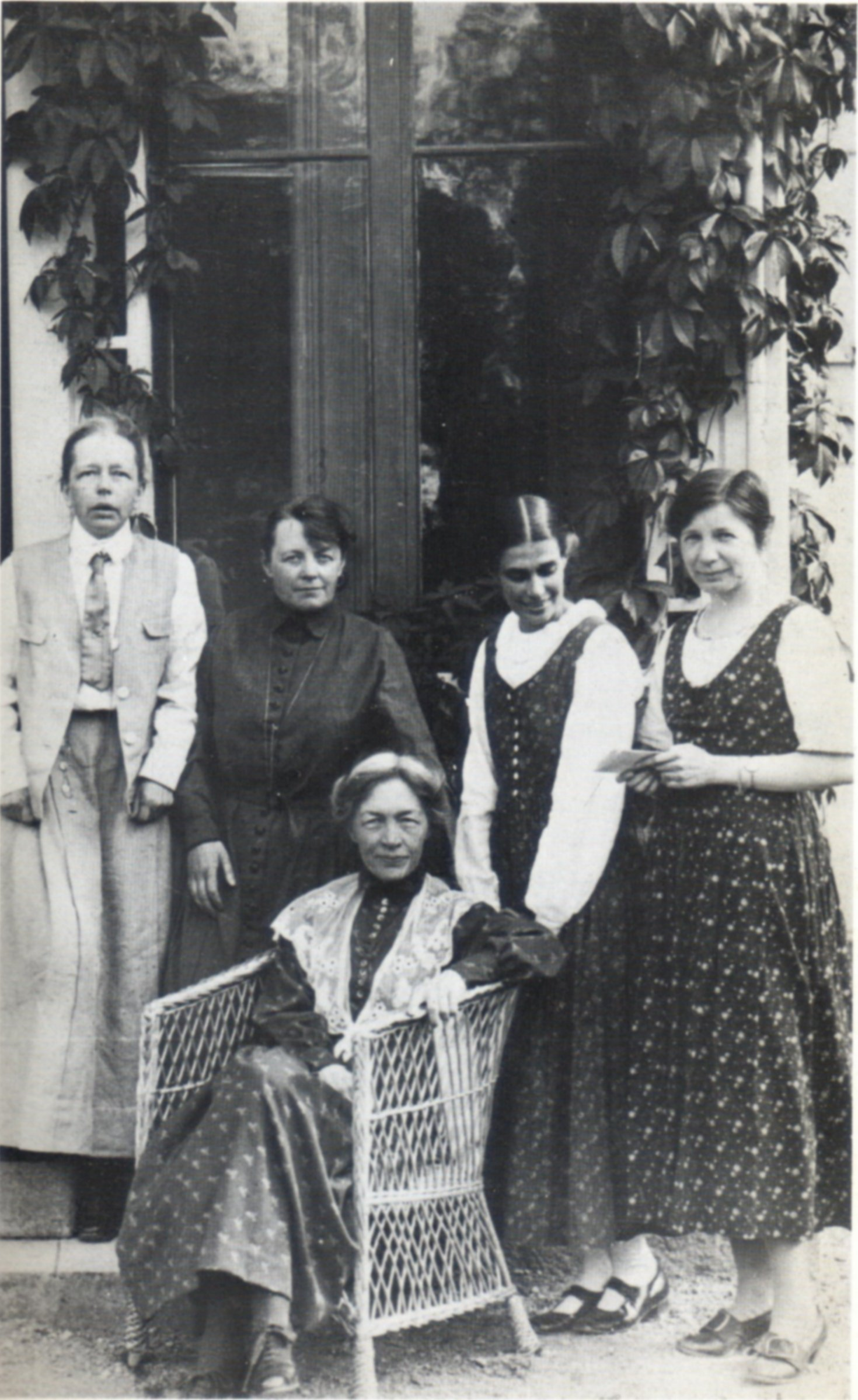
Fogelstadgruppen. From the left: Elisabeth Tamm, Ada Nilsson, Kerstin Hesselgren (sitting), Honorine Hermelin, Elin Wägner.

Being an unmarried woman of legal majority as well as a wealthy property owner, she fulfilled the criteria making her qualified to vote in municipal elections in accordance with the 1862 law, and when women became eligible for municipal elections in 1909, she became engaged in local politics.

She was the deputy chairman of the Communal Council of Julita in 1913, the chairman in 1916, and a member of the board of directors of the city council from 1919 to 1930. She was chairman of the independent politically unaffiliated women's organisation Frisinnade kvinnors riksförbund of Södermanland from 1922 to 1931, and municipal communal speaker for Julita from 1933 to 1936.

In 1921, she became one of the five first women to be elected to the Swedish Parliament after women's suffrage, alongside Nelly Thüring (Social Democrat), Agda Östlund (Social Democrat) and Bertha Wellin (Conservative) in the Lower house (Andra kammaren), and Kerstin Hesselgren in the Upper house (Första kammaren). She focused on women's rights issues, such as equal salaries for women and the access to all official professions for both sexes; the latter issue was addressed between 1919 and 1925 through the Behörighetslagen. She was originally involved with the Liberal Party, but was an independent from 1924. She served as a member of parliament until 1924.

She continued to be active in municipal politics after she left parliament. She retired from politics for health reasons in 1936.

=== Women's rights work ===
Tamm wrote for the women's rights movement papers Tidevarvet and Vi kvinnor. She also founded and financed Tidevarvet and a Norwegian women's magazine, Kvinnen og Tiden (1945–1955).

In 1925, she initiated the Kvinnliga Medborgarskolan ('Citizens' School for Women') on her estate Fogelstad, where she served as chairman. She was also active in ecology and wrote the book Fred med jorden ('Peace with Earth') with Elin Wägner in 1940. Tamm was elected in 1953 to serve on the Executive Council of the Women's International Democratic Federation.
