= Grete Albrecht =

German neurologist

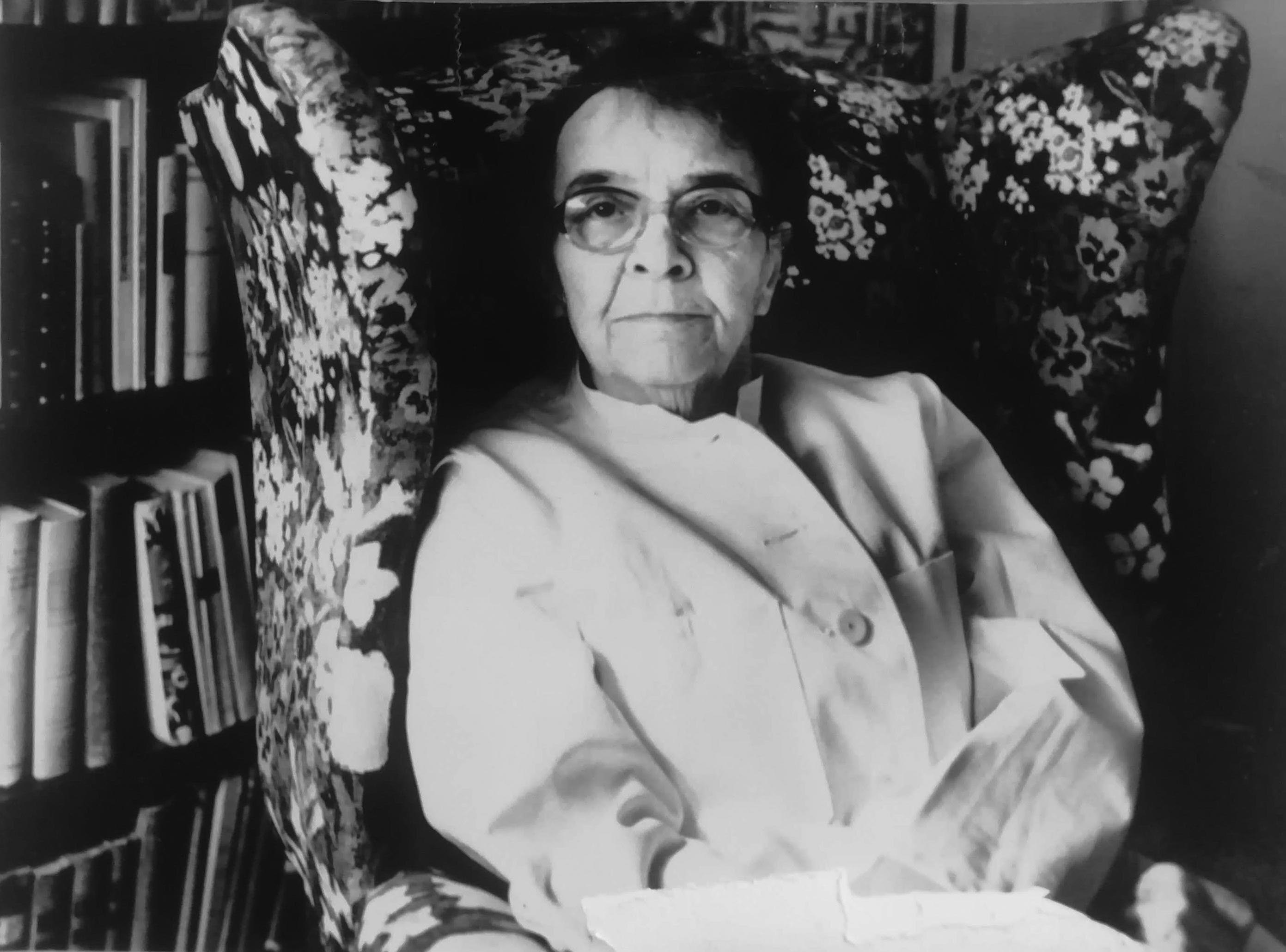
- Born: 17 August 1893; Eilbek, Hamburg
- Died: 5 August 1987 (aged 93)

Grete Albrecht (17 August 1893 – 5 August 1987) was a German neurologist. After World War II ended in 1945 and women doctors were no longer banned from having contracts with the national health insurance system if their husbands were wage earners, Albrecht helped to reestablish the Hamburg Medical Board and served as a director on the board until 1963.

== Early life and education ==
When she was twelve years old, Albrecht decided she wanted to become a doctor; however, her father prohibited her from studying medicine. After he died when she was fifteen, she began attending an all-girls private high school. Because the high school lacked equipment and resources, Albrecht and other female students had to walk to the boys' school to use labs to study hard sciences such as chemistry and physics, which were only made available to them for one hour each day.

== Career ==
Albrecht went on to study medicine at the Ludwig-Maximilians-Universität München and the University of Freiburg before attending Kiel University in 1914. Here, she started working in a lab and attending classes at the University Surgical Center in August 1914, just as World War I was beginning. One year later, in 1915, Albrecht passed the Physikum and started clinicals. In 1918, she received her medical license and took the place of a physician who had been stationed at the front line of the ongoing war.

After getting married and having two children, Albrecht had to leave her practice in Berlin and moved to Hamburg, where she began volunteering in the internal medicine and dermatology wards at a local hospital. It was in Hamburg that her interest in mental and neurological diseases began.

In 1928, Albrecht started training at the University Clinic at Marburg University and the University Clinic in Eppendorf. She started practicing as a neurologist in 1931. When the Nazi period began, however, Albrecht was forbidden to have a contract with the national health insurance system because her husband also had a job.

When the Second World War ended in 1945, Albrecht helped to reestablish the Hamburg Medical Board and became a director, a title she held until 1963. She also helped establish the German Medical Women's Association and was vice-president of the Medical Women's International Association from 1958 to 1963.
