= Alma Sundquist =

Swedish physician and gynaecologist

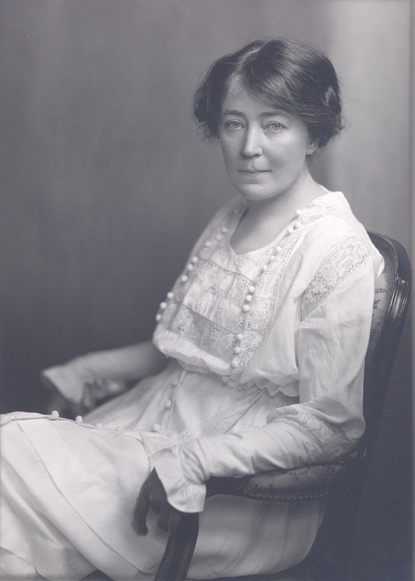
- Sundquist, c. 1919
- Born: Alma Maria Katarina Sundquist; 23 March 1872; Torp, Medelpad, Sweden
- Died: 7 January 1940 (aged 67); Stockholm, Sweden
- Other name: Alma Sundqvist
- Occupations: physician, women's rights activist
- Years active: 1901–1939

Alma Maria Katarina Sundquist (1872–1940) was a Swedish physician and a pioneering female specialist in the treatment of venereal diseases. A committed women's rights activist, she campaigned for better working conditions for women, addressed problems associated with unhygienic homes and prostitution, and promoted the need for sexual education for girls. She fought for women's suffrage, contributing to the inaugural meeting of the Swedish Association for Women's Suffrage (FKPR) in June 1902. Internationally, in 1919 she represented Sweden at the founding of the Medical Women's International Association in New York and attended the First International Congress of Working Women in Washington, D.C. In the early 1930s, on behalf of the League of Nations, she was one of the three contributors to a report on the slave trade in women and children in the countries of Asia.

== Early life and education ==
Born on 23 March 1872 in Torp, Medelpad, Alma Maria Katarina Sundquist was the youngest of the three daughters of the postmaster Johan Erik Sundquist and Katharina Kristina Holmer. After her father died, she moved with her mother and two sisters to Sundsvall. When their house was destroyed by the great fire of 1888, they moved to Stockholm where she graduated from the Wallinska high school in 1891. She then attended Uppsala University where she undertook preparatory studies for medicine and philosophy. During her schooling, she met fellow student, Ada Nilsson. The two women became friends as well as colleagues and in 1892 joined founder Lydia Wahlström as a member of the Uppsala Women's Student Association, along with Adèle Philipson, Gulli Rossander, Signe Trygger, among others.

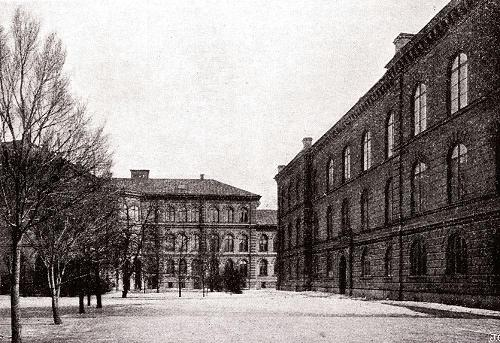
Karolinska Institute, Stockholm

Despite medical practice regulations which barred women from working in public hospitals, she went on to study medicine at the male-dominated Karolinska Institute. While in medical school, Sundquist and Nilsson experienced discrimination from faculty members who refused to give them higher marks than male students. Graduating in 1900, the following January, Nilsson and Sundquist wrote a plea, signed by almost every woman doctor in the country, as well as many female medical students, protesting their inability to work even as paediatricians or on behalf of women patients, except in private practices. Sundquist pointed out that the Royal letter of 1873, which accredited the degree programmes for "candidates of medicine" at the Karolinska Institute, contained no such restrictions. Since women had been admitted to study there in 1870, she demanded the right to work in public facilities.

== Career ==
=== Early career (1901-1918) ===
In 1901, Sundquist opened a private practice in Stockholm which she ran until 1939. Specializing in gynaecology, venereal diseases and dermatology, she taught hygiene in girls' schools and lectured on sexual education throughout the country. She was instrumental in providing access to contraception via physicians' prescriptions and furthered research on venereal diseases. Simultaneously, from 1902 to 1918, she served as the physician at the private girls' Detthowska School and in 1903 began working at the Stockholm City Polyclinic specializing in sexually transmitted diseases. At the clinic, she treated patients who lived in extreme poverty in unsanitary conditions, many of them prostitutes. She saw first hand the damage that prostitution regulations caused for them, and supported reformers like Johan Erik Johansson, who called for the sex trade to be decriminalized and regulation to cease.

Sundquist's medical experiences led to her commitment to social reforms addressing the issues women encountered. She was a pioneering campaigner for women's suffrage, joining the board at the inaugural meeting of the Society for Woman Suffrage (Swedish: Föreningen för kvinnans politiska rösträtt, FKPR) in June 1902, though she resigned the following year. From the end of 1903 until early 1904, she worked on the regulatory Committee for the Prevention of Infectious Sexually Transmitted Diseases and in 1904, was elected to membership of the newly established Dermatological Society. The law barring women physicians from working in public facilities was overturned by new legislation in 1909.

In 1910, Sundquist joined the board of the recently formed Swedish Society for Racial Hygiene (SSR), an organization founded on the principles of the European Eugenics Movement, but after one year, she was no longer listed on the board. That year, wanting both to control immoral behaviour and address the declining birth rate in the country, the Riksdag passed a contraception law (Criminal Code, Chapter 18. § 13, commonly known as Lex Hinke after Hinke Bergegren, the first person prosecuted under it). The law provided that those disseminating public information on contraceptives or involved in their sale could receive sentences of up to two years in prison. Sundquist was very critical of the Contraception Act and began writing various articles about the spread of venereal diseases, as well as on improving working conditions for women and granting suffrage. She was a co-founder of the Swedish Association for Parental Protection and Sexual Reform, established in 1911, where she campaigned against prostitution.

In 1916, Sundquist participated in two conferences for women physicians and medical students, which were spearheaded by Wahlström. They led to the establishment of the Women Doctors' Permanent Committee (Swedish: Kvinnliga läkares permanenta kommitté, KLPK) which aimed to press for changes to laws which prevented women from working as professionals in the medical field, and to assist other women academics in similar endeavours. Among those involved were Nilsson, Andrea Andreen, Elin Odencrants, and Nanna Svartz. One of their first acts was to write to the National Medical Board and press for more supervisory positions for women. In the attached report, they documented that the majority of medical candidates were women, that women were equally capable of treating male patients and that of the 49 licensed women physicians, 20 had already individually been granted supervisory rights when no male doctors were able to take the post.

=== Later career (1919-1939) ===
In March 1919, Sundquist announced to audiences in the United States that women's suffrage had been granted by the first chamber of the Riksdag to all women over age 23. She noted that the property restrictions for voting had been removed and that approval by the second chamber, which would include the right to stand for office, was imminent. In May, full suffrage was granted and Sundquist made plans to attend several conferences in the United States in the fall. She arrived on 17 September to attend the International Conference of Women Physicians, sponsored by the YWCA. During the conference, she argued in favour of sex education in schools, which had recently passed in Sweden. Though American physicians agreed that education was needed, they advocated for home instruction on the subject. On 21 October, a dinner was held for women physicians attending the conference and they decided to form the Medical Women's International Association. Sundquist was elected to serve on the Committee of Twelve to organize the association, whose purpose was to work together internationally to advocate for women to be granted full citizenship and to create a progressive programme to promote public health.

Moving on to Washington, D.C., in late October, Sundquist attended the First International Congress of Working Women, as a member of its executive committee. The purpose of the conference was to ensure that labour reform addressing rights and standards for both women and men that included the abolition of child labour, compulsory education, equal opportunity for employment, equal pay for equal work, and the establishment of minimum wages and maximum hours was adopted by the newly formed International Labour Organization. In a presentation on labour conditions in Sweden, she reported that children of 14 and over could work if a physical examination proved they were able. She also noted that women had been pushed out of jobs that they had performed during the war and were seeking the right to continue in them.

Sundquist participated in the 1922 Constitutive Assembly of the Medical Women's International Association held in Geneva and was later elected president of the organization, serving from 1934 to 1937. She continued to press for economic reforms. The passage of the Competence Act of 1923 opened civil service careers to women. In 1926, she assisted in the reorganization of the Women's Doctors Permanent Committee to the Women's Physicians' Club, to which she was elected chair in 1929.

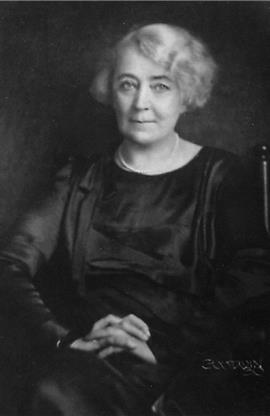
Sundquist portrait by Goodwin

In 1930, along with Bascomb Johnson, an American writer, and Karol Pindór, a Polish diplomat, Sundquist was appointed by the League of Nations to prepare a report on the slave trade in women and children in Asia. When the report was completed in 1932, the three were appointed to a travelling commission and charged with compiling information of a more international nature, since the first report focused on national statistics. They began in Japan and from there travelled to China, Indochina, Indonesia and India, before moving on to Tehran, Bushehr, Baghdad, Damascus, Beirut and Haifa, and worked cooperatively with various government officials to obtain information. In 1938, the Contraception Act she had opposed for so long was abolished. She continued her private practice until 1939.

== Death and legacy ==
Alma Sundquist died in Stockholm on 7 January 1940. She is remembered as one of Sweden's most prominent pioneering venereologists in the first half of the twentieth century, actively engaged in solving social and political challenges faced by women. Through her work, she brought the consequences of sexually transmitted diseases to the Swedish authorities and consulted on developing policy for prevention and treatment of them. She was committed to changing laws to improve conditions for women, as well as eradicating protective legislation which treated people differently based on gender.

== Selected works ==
- Sundquist, Alma (February 1908). "Skyddslagstiftning för kvinnor" [Protective Legislation for Women] (PDF). Morgonbris (in Swedish) (1). Stockholm: Socialdemokratiska Kvinnokongressens Verkställandc Utskott: 9–10. ISSN 0027-1101.
- Kinberg, Julia; Sundquist, Alma (1909). Handledning i sexuell undervisning och uppfostran [Guidance on Sexual Education and Upbringing] (in Swedish). Stockholm: Bonnier. OCLC 14789394.
- Sundquist, Alma (1910). Om behandlingen af gonorré hos kvinnan [About the Treatment of Gonorrhea in Women] (in Swedish). Stockholm. OCLC 185404821.
- Sundquist, Alma (1911). Kommittébetänkandet angående åtgärder för motarbetande af de smittosamma könssjukdomarnas spridning [The Committee Report on Measures to Counteract the Spread of Infectious Sexually Transmitted Diseases] (in Swedish). Stockholm. OCLC 185404826.
- Sundquist, Alma (March 1911). "Den s.k. reglementeringskommitténs betänkande" [The So-called Regulatory Committee Report] (PDF). Morgonbris (in Swedish) (3). Stockholm: Socialdemokratiska Kvinnokongressens Verkställandc Utskott: 3–4. ISSN 0027-1101.
- Sundquist, Alma (1 April 1913a). "Lika lön för lika arbete: varför män böra arbeta för kvinnans politiska rösträtt" [Equal Pay for Equal Work: Why Men Should Work for Women's Political Right to Vote] (PDF). Rösträtt för Kvinnor (in Swedish). 2 (7). Stockholm: Landsföreningen för kvinnans politiska rösträtt: 1–2.
- Sundquist, Alma (1913b). Samhället och prostitutionen: ett föredrag [Society and Prostitution: A Lecture] (in Swedish). Stockholm: Ljus. OCLC 186346955.
- Sundquist, Alma (1 April 1918). "De smittosamma könssjukdomarnas bekämpande och reglementeringen" [Fighting Contagious Sexually Transmitted Diseases and the Fegulations] (PDF). Rösträtt för Kvinnor (in Swedish). 7 (7). Stockholm: Landsföreningen för kvinnans politiska rösträtt: 2–3.
- Sundquist, Alma (February 1920). "Internationella arbeterskekonferensen i Washington" [International Workers' Conference in Washington] (PDF). Morgonbris (in Swedish) (2). Stockholm: Socialdemokratiska Kvinnokongressens Verkställandc Utskott: 1–2. ISSN 0027-1101.
- Sundquist, Alma (March 1920). "Internationella arbeterskekonferensen i Washington Fortsatt" [International Workers' Conference in Washington Continued] (PDF). Morgonbris (in Swedish) (3). Stockholm: Socialdemokratiska Kvinnokongressens Verkställandc Utskott: 1–3. ISSN 0027-1101.
- Sundquist, Alma (1927). "Kring en uppfostringsfråga" [Around a Parenting Issue] (PDF). Tidevarvet (in Swedish). 19 (5). Stockholm: Linkoln Bloms boktr: 2.
- Widerström, Karolina; Sundquist, Alma (1928). Anatomiska väggtavlor [Anatomical Posters] (in Swedish). Stockholm: Norstedt & Söner Skolmateriellavd. OCLC 186207494.
- Sundquist, Alma (5 January 1929). "Glimtar från Wien" [Glimpses from Vienna] (PDF). Tidevarvet (in Swedish). 7 (13). Stockholm: Linkoln Bloms boktr: 3.
- Sundquist, Alma (29 June 1929). "Kongressdagar i Berlin" [Congress Days in Berlin] (PDF). Tidevarvet (in Swedish). 7 (26). Stockholm: Linkoln Bloms boktr: 1, 4.
- von Sneidern, Julia; Sundquist, Alma (1932). Vejledning i seksuel Undervisning for Lærer og Forældre [Guidance on Sexual Instruction for Teachers and Parents] (in Danish). Copenhagen: Gyldendal. OCLC 61035608.
- Sundquist, Alma (1937). "Handeln med kvinnor och barn" [The Trafficking of Women and Children]. Hertha (in Swedish) (24). Stockholm: Fredrika Bremer Association: 268–269. ISSN 0018-0912. OCLC 939254105.
