= Vilhelm Grønbech =

Danish philologist and historian

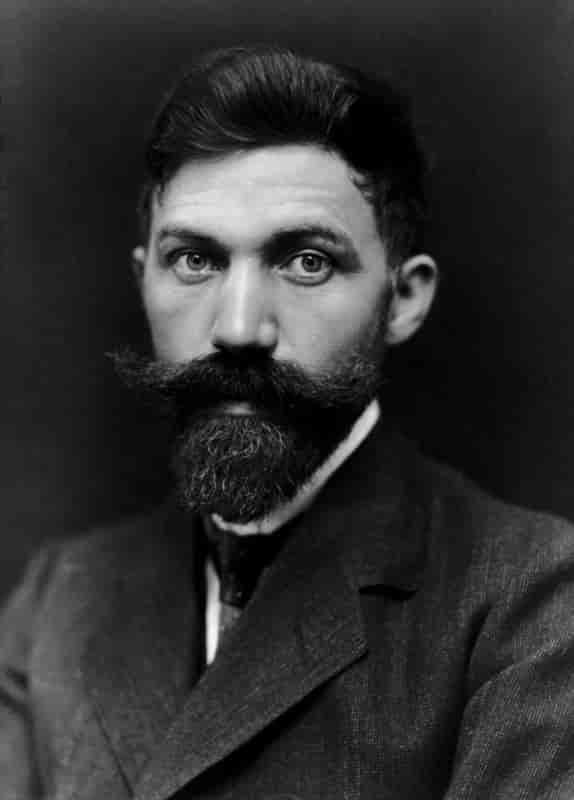
Vilhelm Grønbech, early 1900s

Vilhelm Peter Grønbech (14 June 1873 – 21 April 1948) was a Danish cultural historian. He was professor of the history of religion at the University of Copenhagen and also had a great influence on Danish intellectual life, especially during and after World War II.

== Life and career ==
Grønbech was born in Allinge, on Bornholm. His family moved to Copenhagen and beginning in 1890 he studied philology at the University of Copenhagen (Danish with Latin and English as secondary subjects), while working at the Royal Library and as a schoolteacher. In 1902 he received his doctorate for a study of the historical phonetics of Turkish, after which he began teaching at the university, first as a docent and then from 1908 to 1911 as a lecturer in English literature, while also working as a church organist. He published a book of poems and a study of the dialect of Bukhara.

In 1909 the first volume of his work on Germanic paganism, Vor Folkeætt i Oldtiden (English title The Culture of the Teutons) was published, and in 1911 he became a docent in the history of religion. After the appearance of the remaining three volumes of Vor Folkeætt i Oldtiden in 1912 and of a related essay, "Religionsskiftet i Norden" on the conversion of Scandinavia (1913), the University of Leipzig sought in 1914 to award him a professorship and in 1915 he was appointed professor of the history of religion at Copenhagen, a position which he held until 1943. Early in his career he also taught at the state college of education and from 1918 to 1920 headed the Danish Society for Psychic Research.

During the German occupation of Denmark in World War II, Grønbech's lectures drew large audiences, and after the war he founded the periodical Frie Ord with the theologian Hal Koch. It ran from 1946 to 1948, with Grønbech the primary contributor, and was rapidly successful, with 6,000 subscribers within a few months of its founding. Several of his articles published there were republished in posthumous collections; a 1943 lecture series at Borup's College in Copenhagen was published from shorthand transcriptions as Lyset fra Akropolis (The Light from the Acropolis, 1950).

Grønbech was nominated for the Nobel Prize in Literature eleven times. In the year of his retirement, Allinge awarded him honorary citizenship and the Royal Danish Academy of Sciences and Letters awarded him a free residence at Lundehave in Helsingør; he died in Helsingør in 1948.

Grønbech was married twice, in 1900 to Pauline Ramm, who died in 1946, and in August 1947 to Honorine Louise Hermelin, rector of the Swedish folk high school for women at Fogelstad in Sweden. His son Kaare Grønbech, born in 1901, was a specialist in Asian languages. His second son Bo Groenbech, born in 1907 was an author of many books and highschool teacher in Frederiksberg, Copenhagen. Bo Gronbech died in 2006. Grønbech ordered his papers destroyed, but the Royal Library has a large archive.

== Publications and views ==
Although trained as a philologist, Grønbech's focus from his earliest major work, Vor Folkeæt i Oldtiden, was on analysing key terms in order to apprehend the essence of a religion and hence of a culture. He later applied the same method to the study of Greek, medieval, and Indian mystics (Mystikere i Europa og Indien, 4 volumes, 1925, 1932, 1934, with the last volume being on nineteenth-century poets) and two studies of Greece and Hellenistic Rome, Hellenismen (1940; 2 volumes published, a projected third not completed) and Hellas (4 volumes, 1942, 1944, 1945). He was unusually capable of immersing himself in the system of thought he wished to depict, such that in the words of his English-language biographer he could "write about [it] as if he accepted its theses and principles", and "it is not possible to circumscribe accurately what his own religious—not to mention political—convictions must have been." The admission of multiple realities (but only one actuality) is a leitmotiv in his work, and he gave his second collection of poems, published in 1941, the title Solen har mange veje (The Sun Has Many Paths). Beginning with a much reprinted 1915 essay, "Primitiv Religion", he took a then revolutionary position with respect to "primitive" thought, rejecting the evolutionary hypothesis underlying works such as Frazer's The Golden Bough and instead holding that so-called 'primitive' religion is as complex as modern religion, differing from it in the direct relationship between 'primitive' people and their world; he argued that to label a culture 'primitive' said less about them than about "our own astonishment that people can be different from us". This openness combined with his heavy use of paraphrase can make it hard to distinguish his own position from those of the thinkers he is depicting, for example in his presentation of Empedocles' thought in Hellas, Volume 4.

Grønbech did have a fundamental belief in the importance of "harmony", which he saw as the permeation of life by religion, specifically as society constituting a "community of believers". He viewed emphasis on the individual as destructive to this and therefore criticised Kierkegaard in several of his works, once characterising him as "the last offshoot of medieval mysticism and its selfish concerns and the scholasticism which was identified with it". He was critical of Goethe, on whom he wrote a two-volume book (1935, 1939), because while seeking harmony, he did not appreciate the need for a community of believers. In contrast he appears to have felt a kinship with Herder and was ahead of literary fashion in his appreciation of both Schlegel and Blake.

In general Grønbech was suspicious of mystics as he regarded the mystical experience as inherently selfish; he reached this conclusion after an early mystical experience of his own. He made exceptions for, for example, Wordsworth, whom he regarded as a mystic who had achieved harmony; in an entire volume of his work on mystics devoted to St Teresa, he writes about her with "ironic humo[u]r" but characterises her as having "undermined the authority she was appealing to", contributing to the revolution in thought that "drew the human being out of his church's commonality". In his view as set out in his second major work, Religiøse strømninger i det nittende aarhundrede (Religious Currents of the Nineteenth Century, 1922; translated edition Religious Currents in the 19th Century, 1964), that revolution that ushered in the modern age of crisis in Western religion began not in the sixteenth century with the Protestant Reformation but around 1770 with the development of Romanticism, and the Darwinian theory of evolution restored faith in a universe of laws and was the basis for a new religious harmony. He also regarded the book as a vital means of uniting modern people in shared experience, "lift[ing] modern man out of his lonely imprisonment".

Grønbech's book on Hellenism was an outgrowth of his work on a three-volume analysis of early Christianity, Jesus, menneskesønnen (Jesus, the Son of Man, 1935), Paulus (St Paul, 1940) and Kristus (Christ, 1941). He interpreted Jesus as "an agitator in the world of the spirit" who attempted to create the Kingdom of God on earth; the first book, Jesus, is more simply written than other works of his and provoked negative responses, but became his most-read book. One reviewer of Jesus noted that a theme of Grønbech's, which he saw in Jesus, was the commandment to simply live, rather than to analyse morality. The other two volumes, and the work on Hellenism, appeared only after Denmark was under occupation, and his treatment of Hellenistic Rome can often be read as applicable to his own period.

== Influence ==
Grønbech's ideas were influential in Denmark, and reached a broad popular audience. His writings and in particular Frie Ord have often been said to have been the impetus for the establishment of Heretica, an influential literary journal published from 1948 to 1953; the third issue contains three articles written in tribute to him following his death, of which that by the poet and co-editor Thorkild Bjørnvig is titled "The Heretic".

A Grønbech Society was formed in Copenhagen in 1994.

== Works ==
- Vor Folkeæt i Oldtiden (The Culture of the Teutons) (4 volumes, 1909–1912).
- Mystikere i Europa og Indien (Mystics in Europe and India) (4 volumes, 1925–1935).
- Nordiske myter og sagn (Nordic Myths and Legends) (1926).
- William Blake (1933).
- Jesus Menneskesønnen (Jesus, the Son of Man, 1935).
- Goethe (1935).
- Hellenismen (Hellenism) (2 volumes, 1940).
- Paulus (St. Paul, 1940).
- Kristus. Den opstandne Frelser (Christ: The Risen Savior, 1941).
- Hellas (4 volumes, 1942–1945).

== See also ==
- Gudmund Schütte
