= Julia Kinberg =

Swedish physician and feminist (1919–2002)

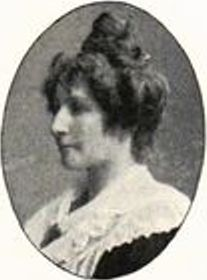
- Born: Julia Rosenbaum; 1 April 1874; Haparanda
- Died: 17 June 1945 (aged 71); Holm, Sweden
- Education: Uppsala University
- Years active: 1900s–1945
- Spouses: Olof Kinberg; Axel von Sneidern
- Awards: Illis quorum
- Medical career
- Profession: Physician
- Institutions: Uppsala University Hospital
- Sub-specialties: Pediatrics

Julia Kinberg (née: Rosenbaum; 1874–1945) was a Swedish physician and feminist who is known for her involvement in the establishment of a feminist organization Frisinnade Kvinnor.

== Early life and education ==
She was born in Haparanda on 1 April 1874 into a bourgeois family. She received a degree in medicine in Uppsala in 1907.

== Career and activities ==
She was an assistant at Uppsala University's medical and pediatric outpatient clinic between 1904 and 1905. Following her graduation she served as a paediatrician and a physician in Stockholm. She worked at Stockholm schools as a physician from 1912. She and another physician Ada Nilsson established a feminist organization Frisinnade Kvinnor which supported the eugenic feminism. Kinberg and Karolina Widerström involved in many activities concerning the women-related topics such as prostitution, abortion and the contraception.

Kinberg was a member of the board of the State Educational Institution for Mentally Retarded Girls in Vänersborg from 1922 to 1944 and the chairman of the Mother's Aid Board in Älvsborg County Council from 1937 to 1941. She was also active in charities, the Red Cross and the Fredrika Bremer Association. During the World War II she contributed to the activities for Jewish refugees.

=== Books ===
Kinberg authored two books: Handledning i sexuell undervisning och uppfostran (1924; Swedish: Tutoring in Sexual Education and Enlightenment] which she cowrote with Alma Sundquist and Sexuell etik (1931; Swedish: Sexual Ethics). The former book presented an alternative view about the mother–child-father relationship in contrast to the Freudian view and defended the idea that sexual hygiene was part public health.

She also translated German psychiatrist Gustav Aschaffenburg's book entitled Das Verbrechen und seine Bekämpfung (German: The Commission of Crime and its Control) into Swedish with her first husband Olof Kinberg.

== Personal life and death ==
She married psychiatrist Olof Kinberg in 1898, and they divorced in 1915. During this period she began to use her husband's surname. She married Axel von Sneidern in 1917, and since then she was known as Julia Kinberg von Sneidern. She had children.

Kinberg died in Holm on 17 June 1945.

=== Awards ===
Kinberg was awarded Illis quorum in 1934.
