= Fogelstad =

Coordinates: 59°09′04″N 16°05′29″E

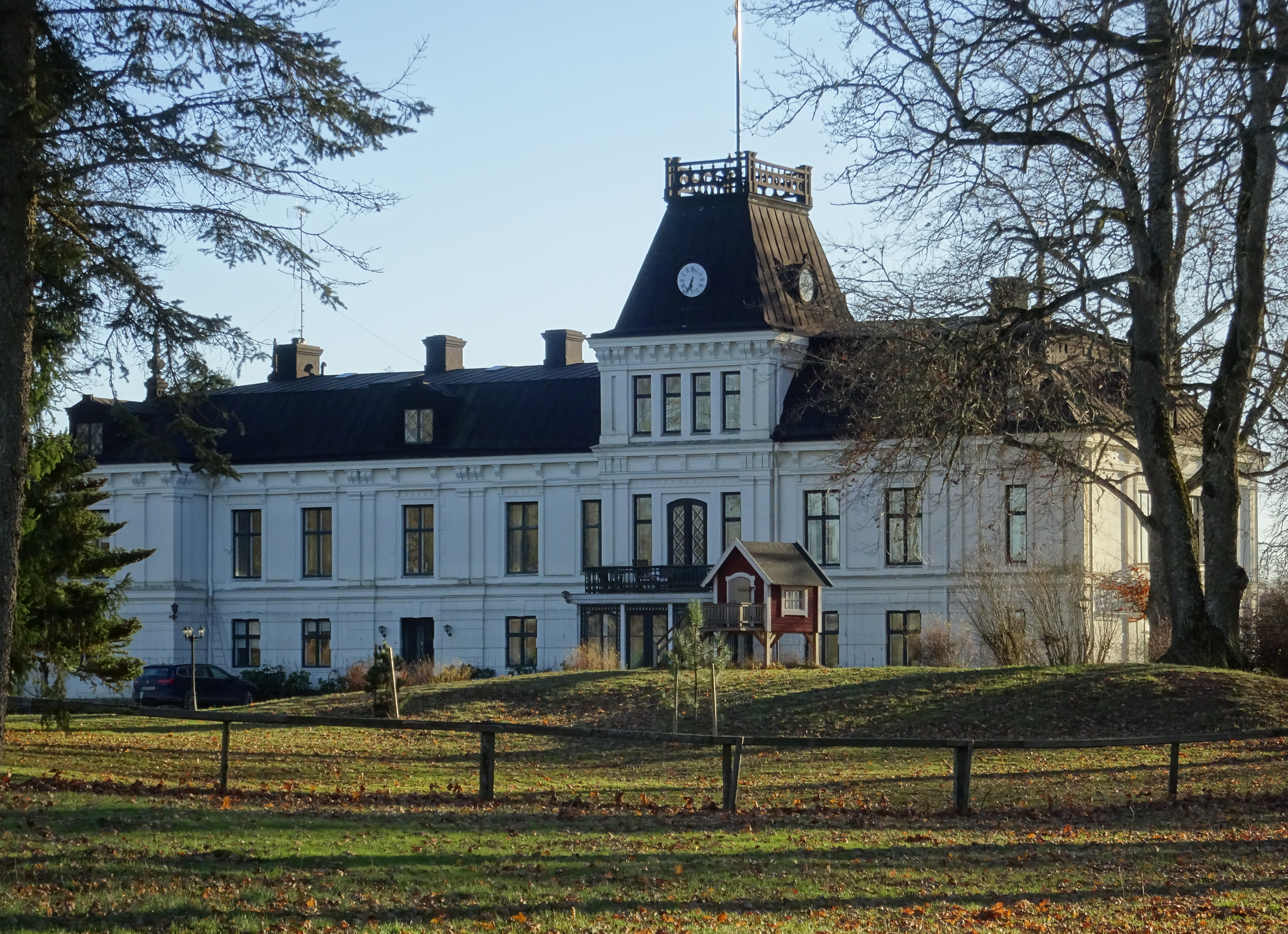

General information
- Location: Sweden
- Completed: 1883

Design and construction
- Architect: Emil Victor Langlet

Fogelstad is a manor house and former seat farm in Södermanland, Sweden. In the 1750s, the manor was owned by Baron Fabian Wrede. The seat farm was acquired by August Tamm in the late 19th century, where he built what is today Fogelstad manor house. Fogelstad has since been associated with Tamm's daughter, women's rights activist Elisabeth Tamm who was born at Fogelstad, and was one of the first women in parliament.

== See also ==
- Kvinnliga medborgarskolan vid Fogelstad

== Bibliography ==
- Söderberg, Bengt G. (1968). Slott och herresäten i Sverige – Södermanland 2. Malmö: Allhems Förlag.
