= Kvinnliga medborgarskolan vid Fogelstad =

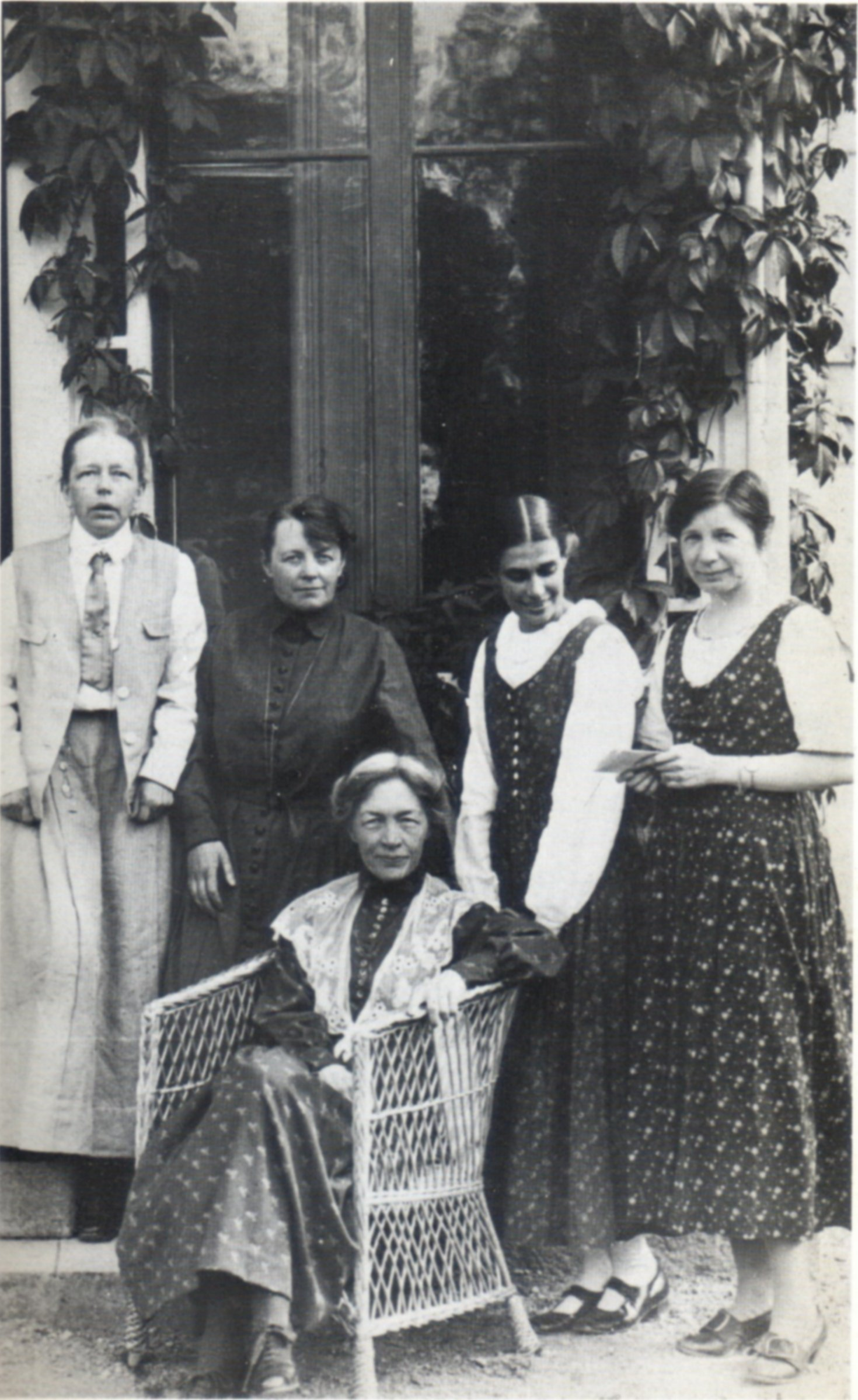
From left to right: Elisabeth Tamm, Ada Nilsson, Kerstin Hesselgren, Honorine Hermelin and Elin Wägner, members of the Fogelstadgruppen, who founded and managed the Kvinnliga medborgarskolan vid Fogelstad.

Kvinnliga medborgarskolan vid Fogelstad (Fogelstad Citizen School for Women) was a Swedish education center for women, active from 1922 until 1954. The purpose of the center was to educate women about their newly affirmed rights and responsibilities as citizens after women suffrage had been achieved in 1921.

The center was founded by the Fogelstadgruppen (Fogelstad Group), a women's group which also managed the Frisinnade kvinnors riksförbund (Union of Liberal Women) and the magazine Tidevarvet, and it was situated at the Folgestad manor, which was owned by one of the members: Elisabeth Tamm, herself one of the first women members of the Swedish parliament.

== Notable alumni ==
- Göta Rosén (1904–2006), politician and child welfare inspector

== See also ==
- Behörighetslagen
- Svenska Kvinnors Medborgarförbund
