= World War I prisoners of war in Russia =

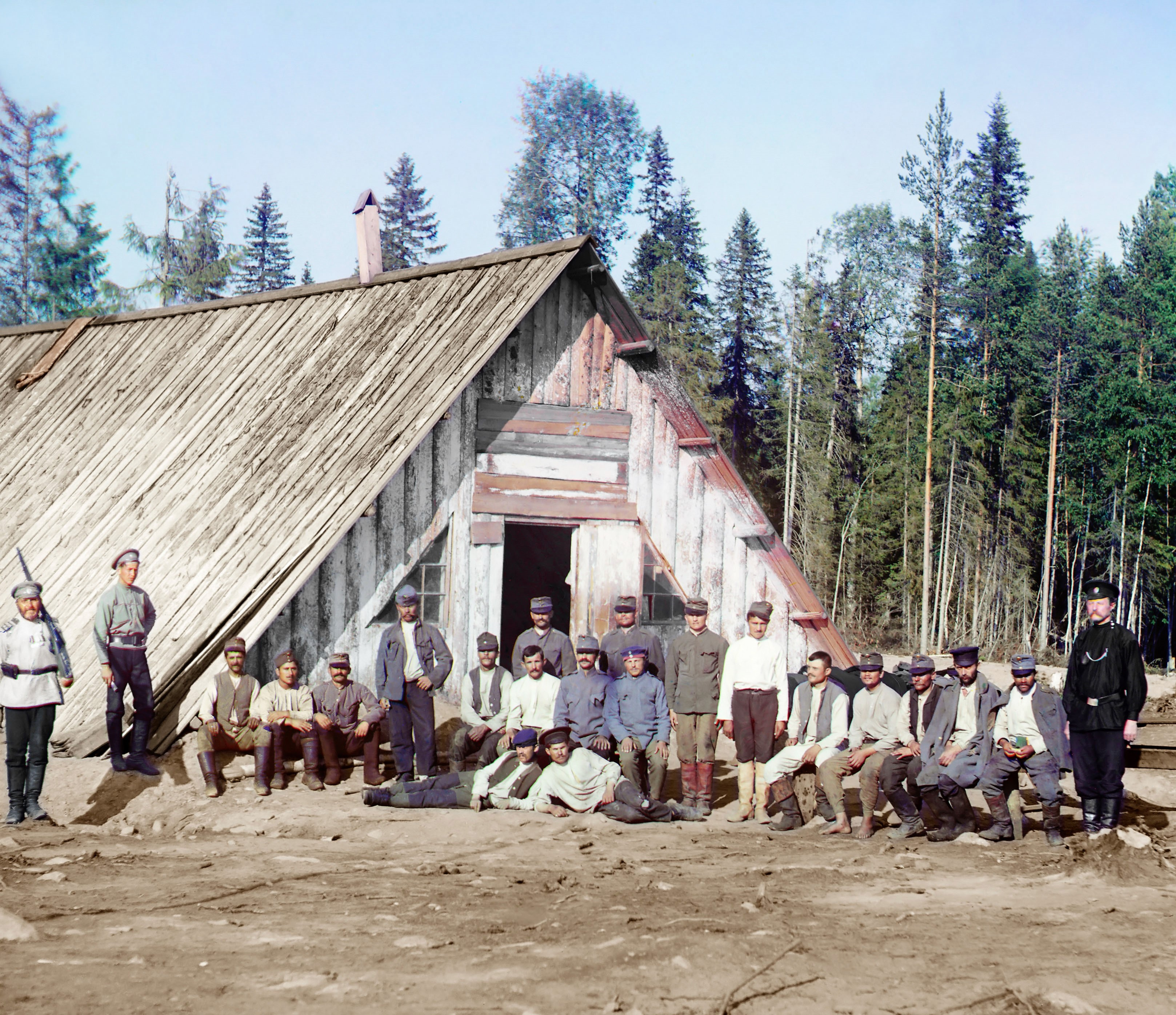
Austrian prisoners of war in Olonets province (Russia).

The Prisoners of war of the First World War in Russia included a majority of Austro-Hungarians (between 1,6 and 2 million), 167,000 Germans, and 50,000 Ottomans. Along with Germany, Russia held the largest number of prisoners during this conflict.

== Causes ==
The large number of Austro-Hungarian prisoners, double that of Russian prisoners in Austria-Hungary, was the consequence of the disasters suffered by the Austro-Hungarian army at the beginning of the war, resulting from the priority given by the Russian General Staff to the Austrian front. Particularly during the Battle of Galicia (1914), the Siege of Przemyśl (1914–1915), and the retreat of the Austrian front in June 1916 during the Brusilov Offensive (1916), huge numbers of Austro-Hungarian soldiers were captured.

A lack of fighting spirit and the failures of certain units also contributed to this disproportion. While the peoples of Austria-Hungary generally supported the general mobilization at the beginning of the war, cohesion subsequently weakened. For instance, the 28th Infantry Regiment from Prague surrendered to the Russians without a fight on 27 April 1915 , and Ruthenian and Czech regiments surrendered or deserted during the battles of June 1916. An additional factor was the anti-war propaganda spread in the Austro-Hungarian army by Socialist and Bolshevik soldiers .

In contrast, facing the German army, the Russian army was largely dominated and forced to retreat, abandoning a large part of its territory, resulting in a significant disproportion in the number of prisoners: the Germans captured a total of 1,434,000 Russians.

== Living conditions ==
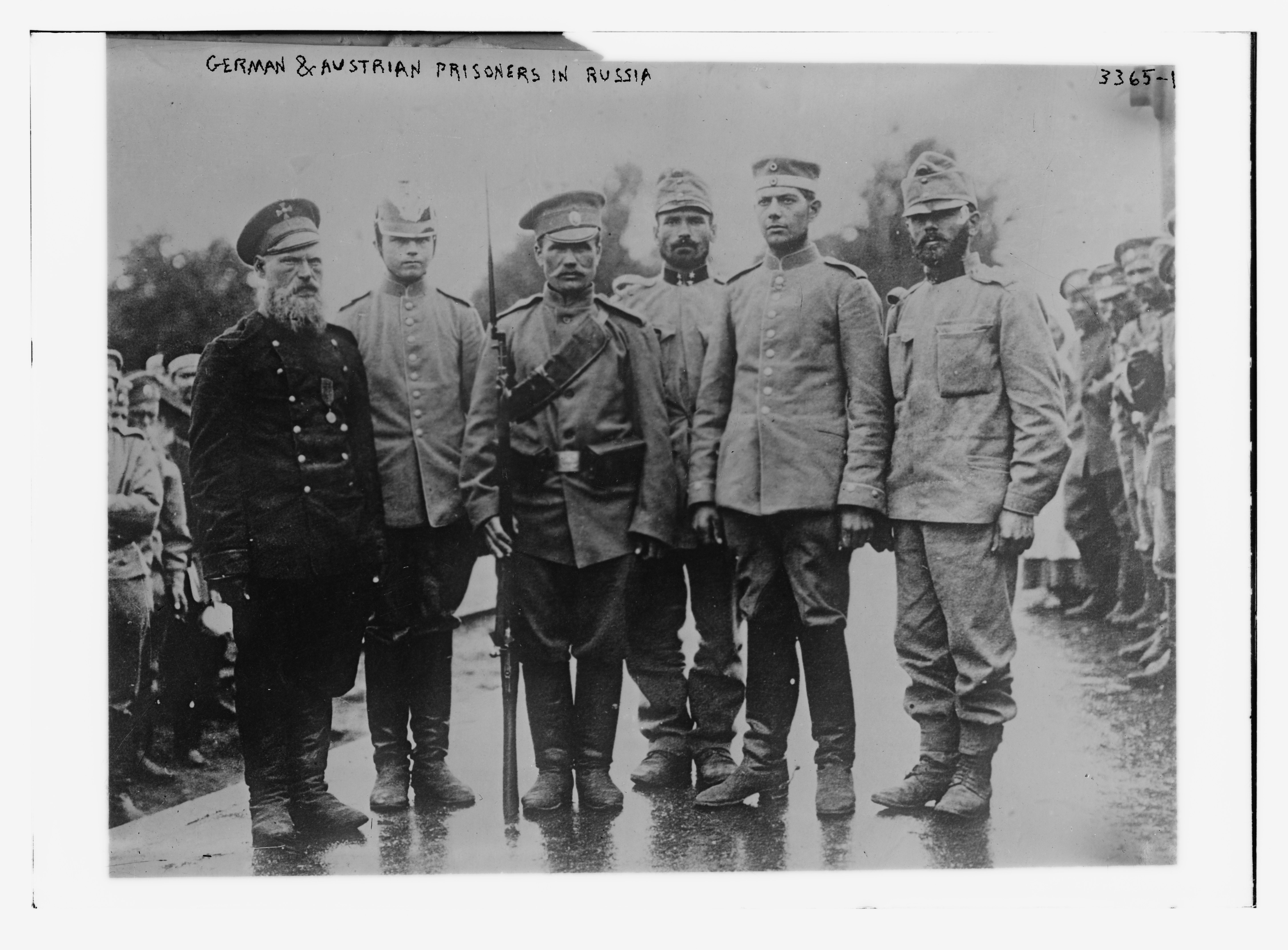
German & Austrian prisoners in Russia

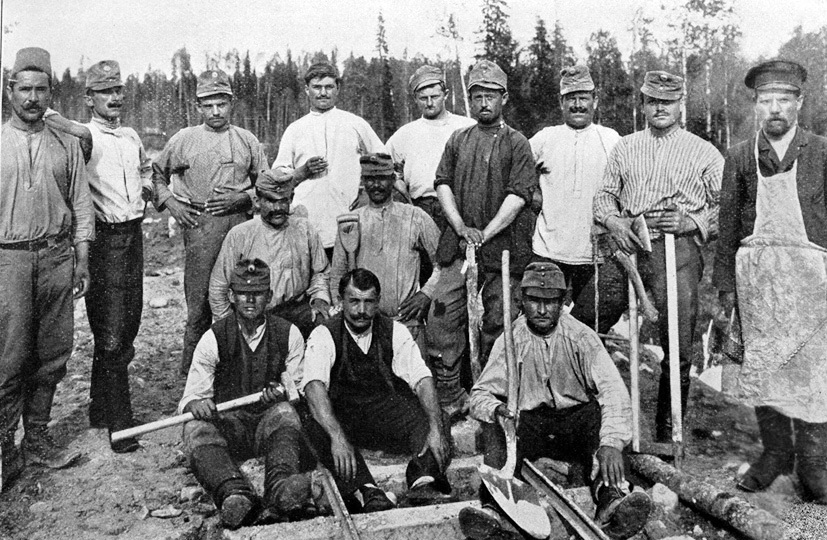
Austrian prisoners at the construction site of the Murmansk Railway.

The high mortality rate of prisoners in Russia throughout the war, approximately 17.6%, significantly higher than that of prisoners in Austria (7%), France (5.3%), and Germany (3.5%), was primarily the result of Russia's unpreparedness for such an influx, the lack of available accommodation, which forced the initial use of various buildings such as barns, abandoned factories, and private homes, and harsh climatic and transportation conditions (long, exhausting marches, endless train journeys), but not of persecution or punitive policies. On the contrary, most former prisoners reported good treatment and a friendly welcome from the Russians.
However, some 300,000 prisoners died, mainly from typhoid, dysentery, exhaustion and hunger . From 1916 onwards, mortality declined following the establishment of camps and organizational changes that improved sanitary conditions, thanks also to the assistance provided by Austria-Hungary and Germany to their nationals. However, the situation deteriorated again, after the chaos caused by the February 1917 and October 1917 Revolutions .

Among the prisoners, Austro-Hungarians Slavs (Czechs, Slovaks, South Slavs), were given priority treatment and often housed separately. The Russians offered them the opportunity to enlist in brigades: approximately 10% of Slavic prisoners volunteered.

However, this discrimination had little effect due to the general poverty. Rations and living conditions, which varied greatly, depended more on the nature of the work and the chance of assignments than on ethnic origin . The prisoners were used in agriculture (460,000 in May 1916), on roadwork (140,000 in May 1916) , and in industry (1,640,000) . Prisoners constituted a significant portion of the workforce in several sectors of the economy, like 60% in iron mines and 30% of foundry workers, due to low pay .

== Return of prisoners ==
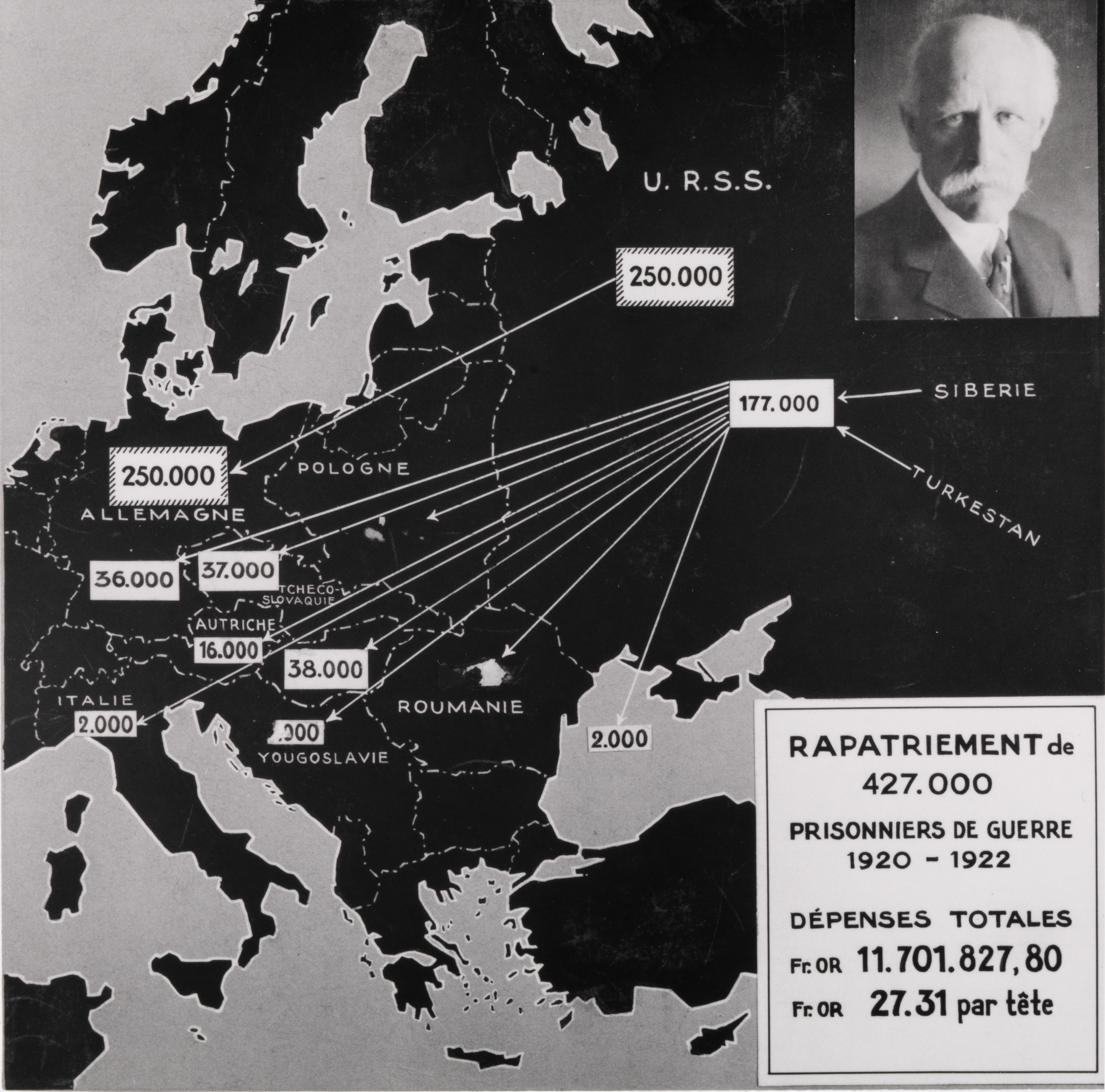
Map of Europe showing the number of prisoners of war returned from Russia during the period 1920–1922.

The Treaty of Brest-Litovsk (March 1918) provided for the release of all prisoners from both sides. Those held in Russia, the majority Austro-Hungarians, numbering approximately 2 million, were repatriated starting in March 1918. This return was relatively slow (fewer than 500,000 by the beginning of the summer).

The first released prisoners were reincorporated into the Austro-Hungarian army after a three-week quarantine, rigorous interrogation, and a four-week leave. This return to the army was accompanied by acts of disobedience, mutinies, and desertions, by soldiers who had hoped the war was over.

Subsequently, the Russian Civil War delayed the repatriation of prisoners still present in Russia until 1922. Many remaining former Austro-Hungarian prisoners of war participated in the Russian Civil War on both sides. Best known is the Czechoslovak Legion, which fought against the Bolsheviks.

== Well-known World War I prisoners of war in Russia ==
- Josip Broz Tito (1892–1980), future President of Yugoslavia, captured on 25 March 1915, joined the International Red Guard in November 1917, returned to Croatia in the autumn of 1920.
- Béla Kun (1886–1938), captured in 1916. Fought for the Bolsheviks in the Russian Civil War. Leader of the Hungarian Soviet Republic (1919).
- Imre Nagy (1896–1958), captured in 1916. Fought for the Red Army in the Russian Civil War. Prime Minister of Hungary and executed after the Hungarian Revolution of 1956.
- Mátyás Rákosi (1892–1971), captured in 1915. De facto leader of Hungary from 1947 to 1956.
- Máté Zalka (1896–1937), captured in 1917. Joined the Red Army. Fought against the Whites. Killed in the Spanish Civil War.
- Said Nursi (1877–1960), captured in 1916. Turkish scholar of Islam
- Ernst Mohr (1877–1916), German olympic gymnast. Died in Russian captivity.
- Karl Braunsteiner (1891–1916), Austrian soccer player. Died of typhoid fever.
- Paul Wittgenstein (1887–1961), Austrian concert pianist. Captured in 1914. Had his right arm amputated.

== See also ==
- Prisoners of war in World War I

== Sources ==
- Bled, Jean-Paul (2014). L'agonie d'une monarchie, Autriche-Hongrie 1914-1920 (in French). Paris: Taillandier. p. 464. ISBN 979-10-210-0440-5.
- Sumpf, Alexandre (2014). La grande guerre oubliée, Russie 1914-1918 (in French). Paris: Éditions Perrin. p. 527. ISBN 978-2-262-04045-1.
- Volgyes, Ivan (1973). "Hungarian prisoners of war in Russia, 1916-1919". Cahiers du Monde Russe et Soviétique. 14. Cahiers du Monde Russe: 54–85. doi:10.3406/cmr.1973.1171.
- Gustav Krist (1936), Pascholl plenny! (Wien: L. W. Seidel & sohn), translated by E. O. Lorimer as Prisoner in the Forbidden Land.
- Reinhard Nachtigal and Lena Radauer (2014), International Encyclopedia of the First World War: Prisoners of War (Russian Empire)
