= Caleb Althin =

Swedish painter, illustrator and art teacher

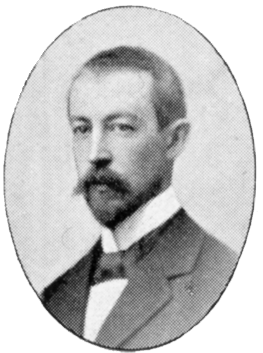
- Photo from the Svenskt Porträttgalleri XX (1901)
- Born: 20 February 1866; Karlskrona, Sweden
- Died: 29 January 1919 (aged 52); Stockholm, Sweden
- Education: Royal Swedish Academy of Arts
- Known for: Painting, Drawing, Illustrations

Caleb Althin (1866–1919) was a Swedish painter, illustrator, and art teacher.

== Biography ==
His father, Carl Johan Althin (1832-1869), was a pastor. He went to Stockholm for his primary education. During that time, he received some art lessons from the court curator, Edvard Perséus. From 1885 to 1892, he was a student at the Royal Swedish Academy of Arts, although he spent the years 1889 to 1891 abroad, to study decorative painting in Paris with Pierre-Victor Galland. After graduating, he became a teacher of freehand drawing.

He is perhaps best known as the founder of Althin's School of Painting, a private preparatory school that opened in 1896. He continued to teach freehand and figure drawing at other schools; notably at the "Technical School for Female Students", a division of the University of Arts, Crafts and Design.

In addition to his paintings and drawings, he created decorative works for Sofia Church in Stockholm, Uppsala Cathedral and at Sollefteå Church, as well as at smaller churches in Örebro, Härnösand and Sundsvall. He also produced magazine illustrations and posters, including several for Salvator Beer, produced at the Stora Bryggeriet (Great Brewery).

In 1894, he married Elisabet Maria Carlheim-Gyllensköld (1870-1911); daughter of the naval commander, Alfred Carlheim-Gyllensköld. He remarried in 1912, to Matilda Forsström (1883-1924), the daughter of a court clerk. Both marriages were childless.

== Selected works ==
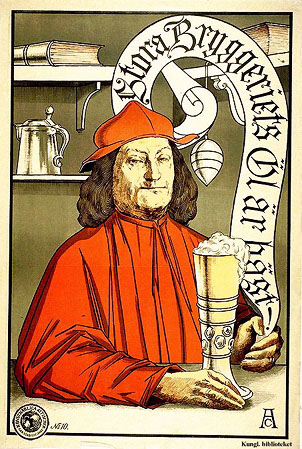
Poster for the
Stora Bryggeriet

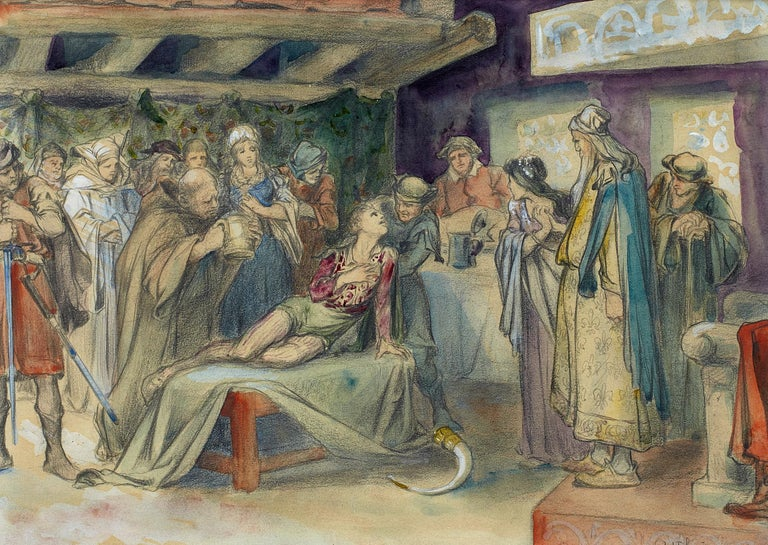
The Wounded Man (History of Ljungby)

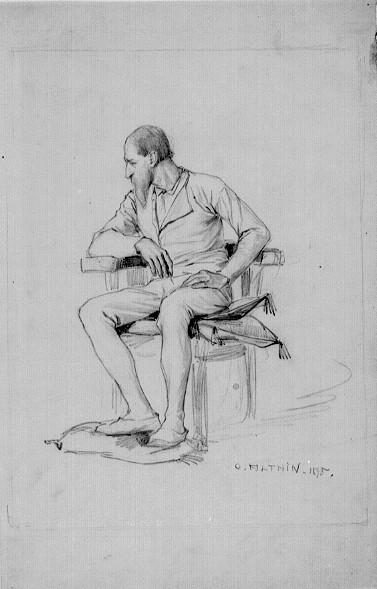
Sitting Man

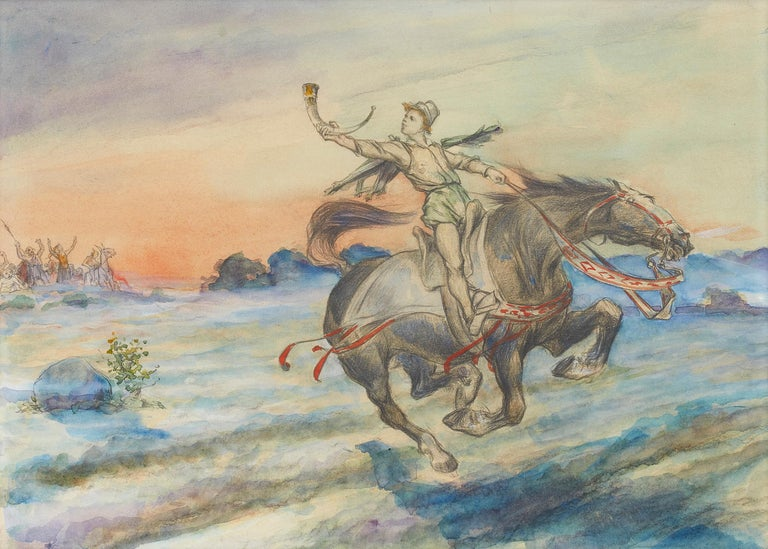
The Man Who Stole the Golden Horn (History of Ljungby)

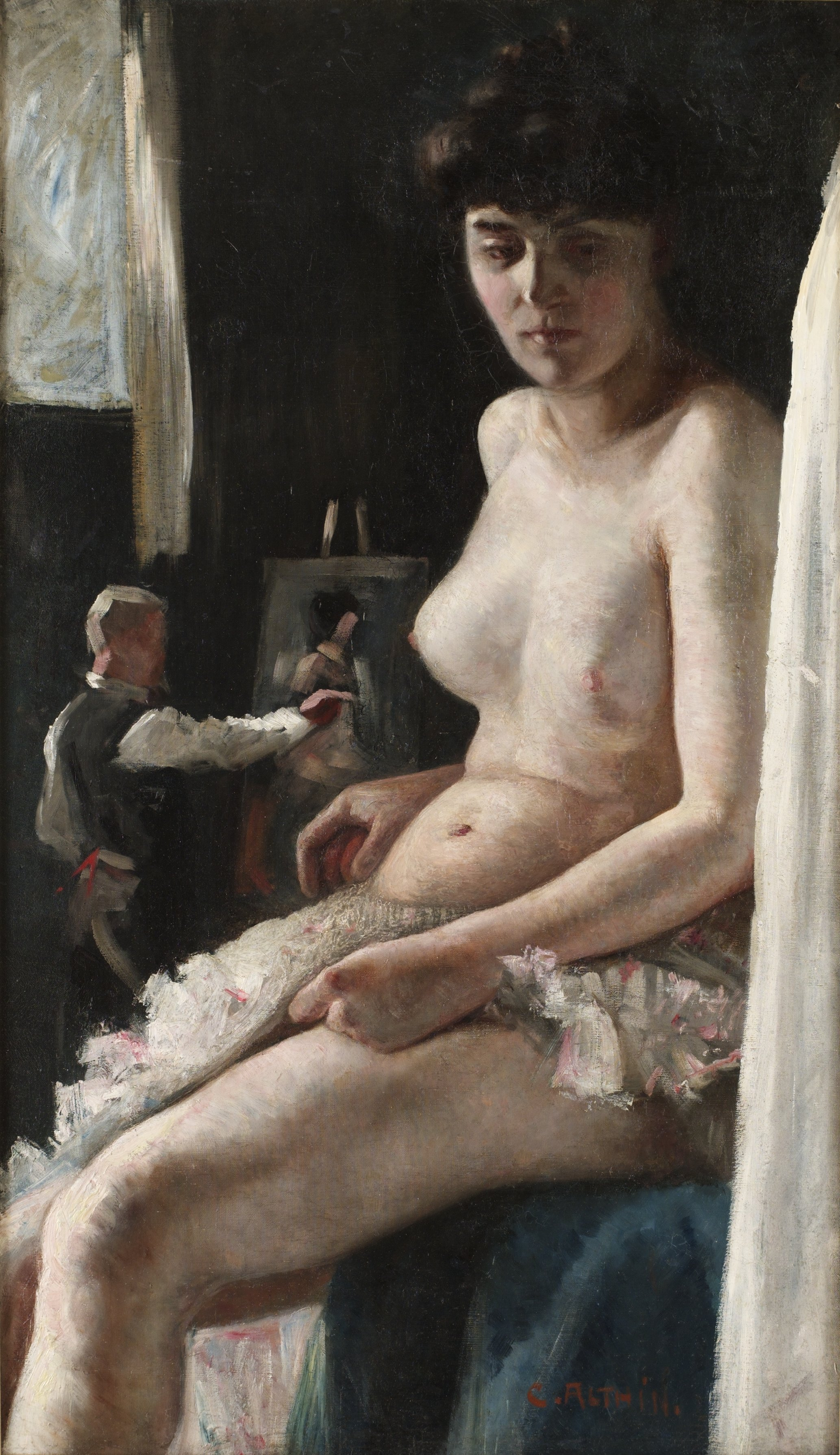
The Artist's Model
