= Elin Wägner =

Swedish writer, journalist and Suffragette (1882–1949)

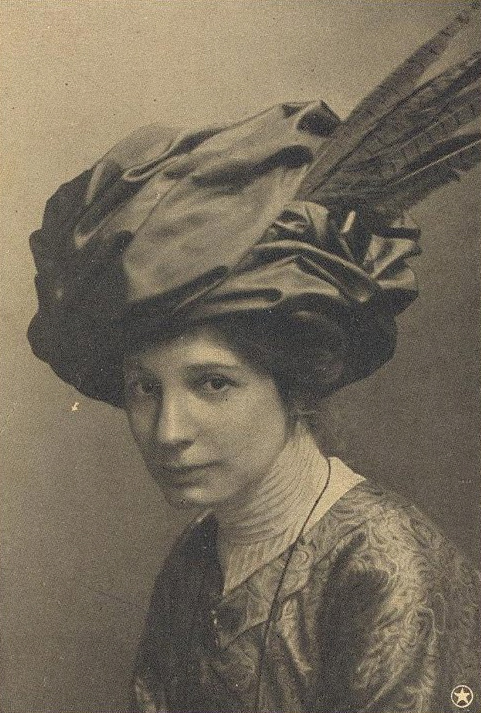
- Born: 16 May 1882; Lund, Sweden-Norway
- Died: 7 January 1949 (aged 66)
- Other name: Elin Matilda Elisabet Wägner
- Occupation: Writer
- Known for: Writer, journalist, feminist-pioneer, teacher, ecologist and pacifist, member of the Swedish Academy.

Elin Matilda Elisabet Wägner (16 May 1882 – 7 January 1949) was a Swedish writer, journalist, feminist, teacher, ecologist and pacifist. She was a member of the Swedish Academy from 1944.

== Biography ==
Elin Wägner was born in Lund, Sweden as the daughter of a school principal. Wägner was only three years old when her mother died. Wägner's books and articles focus on the subjects of women's emancipation, civil rights, votes for women, the peace movement, welfare, and environmental pollution. She is best known for her commitment to the women's suffrage movement in Sweden, National Association for Women's Suffrage, for founding the Swedish organization Rädda Barnen (the Swedish chapter of the International Save the Children Alliance) and for developing the women's citizen school at Fogelstad (where she was also a teacher on civil rights).

Alongside Fredrika Bremer, Wägner is often seen as the most important and influential feminist pioneer in Sweden.

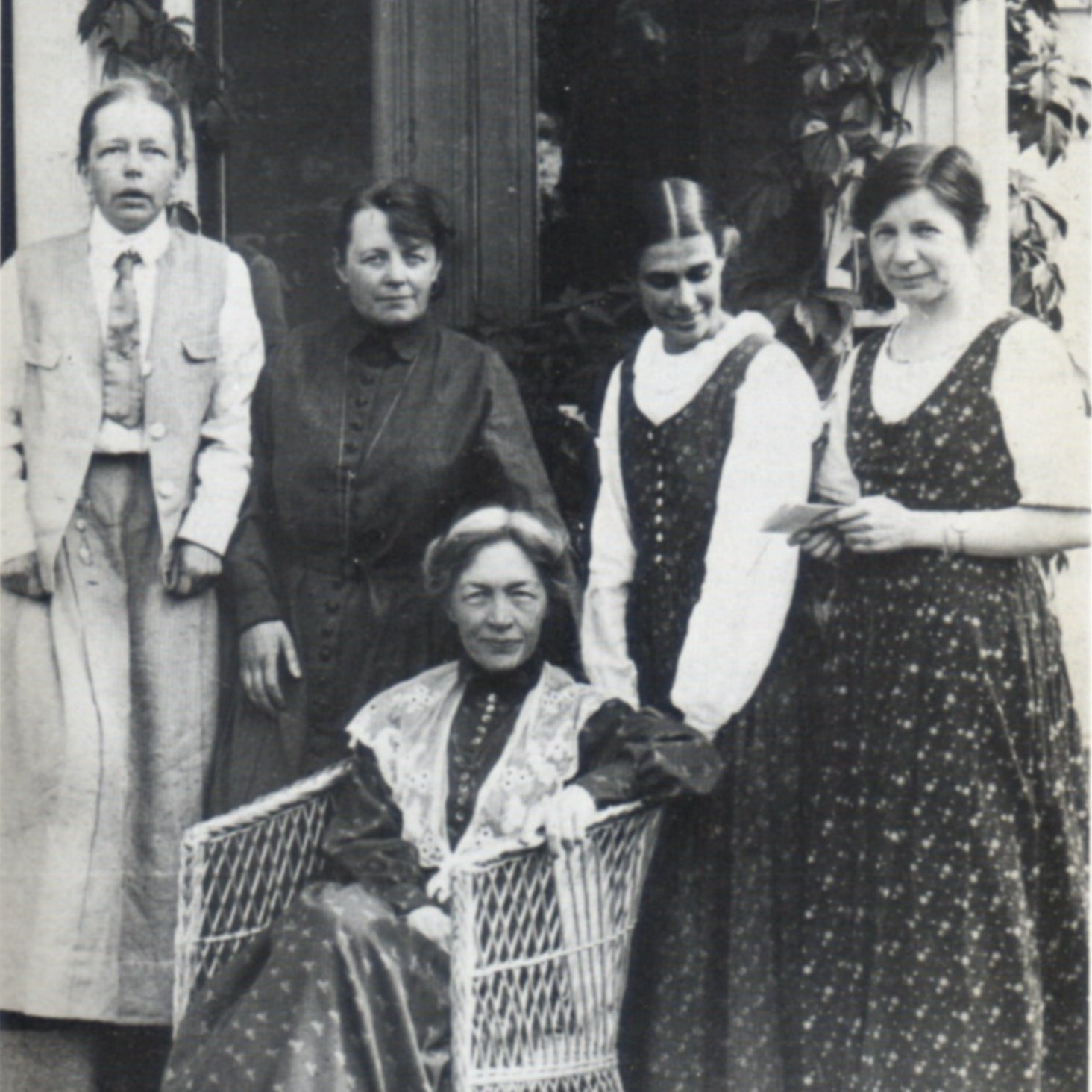
1920s feminists Left to right: Elisabeth Tamm, Ada Nilsson, Kerstin Hesselgren (sitting), Honorine Hermelin and Elin Wägner

Wägner was the launching editor of the weekly political magazine Tidevarvet and headed the magazine from 1924 to 1927. A prolific writer, Wägner wrote novels, articles in various daily newspapers and screenplays for a number of films. Among Wägner's most popular novels — which continue to be read — are: Norrtullsligan ("Men and Other Misfortunes", 1908), Pennskaftet ("The Penholder", 1910), Åsa-Hanna (1918), Kvarteret Oron ("Stormy Corner", 1919), Silverforsen ("The Silver Rapids", 1924), Vändkorset ("The Turnstile", 1934), Väckarklocka ("Alarm Clock", 1941) and Vinden vände bladen ("The Wind Turned The Pages", 1947). Her three novels Dialogen fortsätter, 1932, Genomskådad, 1937, and Hemlighetsfull, 1938, are credited with projecting her pacifist stance foreseeing the threat of further war. Her 1941 non-fiction title Väckarklocka (Alarm Clock) foresees environmental issues, but it was her biography of Selma Lagerlöf that is credited with winning her a place at the prestigious Swedish Academy.

Wägner has recently been translated into English with Stockholm Stories (2002), which contains two of her wittiest novels: Men and Other Misfortunes and Stormy Corner. Many of her books have previously been translated into French, German, Dutch, and Russian.

Wägner was married to John Landquist from 1910 to 1922.

== Bibliography ==
Work by Wägner include the following:

=== Books ===
- Från det Jordiska Museet (1907)
- Norrtullsligan (1908) – "Men and Other Misfortunes"
- Pennskaftet (1910) – "The Penwoman"
- Helga Wisbeck (1913)
- Mannen och Körsbären (1914) – "The Man and the Cherries"
- Camillas Äktenskap (1915) – "Camilla's Marriage"
- Släkten Jerneploogs Framgång (1916)
- Åsa-Hanna (1918)
- Kvarteret Oron (1919) – "Stormy Corner"
- Den Befriade Kärleken (1919) – "The Liberated Love"
- Den Förödda Vingården (1920)
- Nyckelknippan (1921) – "The Bunch of Keys"
- Den Namnlösa (1922) – "The Nameless"
- Från Seine, Rhen och Ruhr (1923)
- Silverforsen (1924) – "The Silver Rapids"
- Natten till Söndag (1926)
- De Fem Pärlorna (1927)
- Den Odödliga Gärningen (1928)
- Svalorna Flyga Högt (1929)
- Korpungen och Jag (1930)
- Gammalrödja (1931)
- Dialogen Fortsätter (1932) – "The Dialogue Continues"
- Mannen vid min Sida (1933) – "The Man by my Side"
- Vändkorset (1934) – "The Turnstile"
- Genomskådad (1937) – "Unmasked"
- Hemlighetsfull (1938) – "Mysterious"
- Tusen År i Småland (1939) – "Thousand Years in Småland"
- Fred med Jorden (1940) – "At Peace with Earth"
- Väckarklocka (1941) – "Alarm Clock"
- Selma Lagerlöf I (1942)
- Selma Lagerlöf II (1943)
- Hans Larsson (1944)
- Vinden Vände Bladen (1947) – "The Wind Turned The Pages"
- Spinnerskan (1948)
- Fredrika Bremer (1949)

Cultural offices
Preceded by Hans Larsson	Swedish Academy, Seat No 15; 1944–1949	Succeeded by Harry Martinson
