= Honorine Hermelin =

Swedish headteacher, magazine founder and feminist

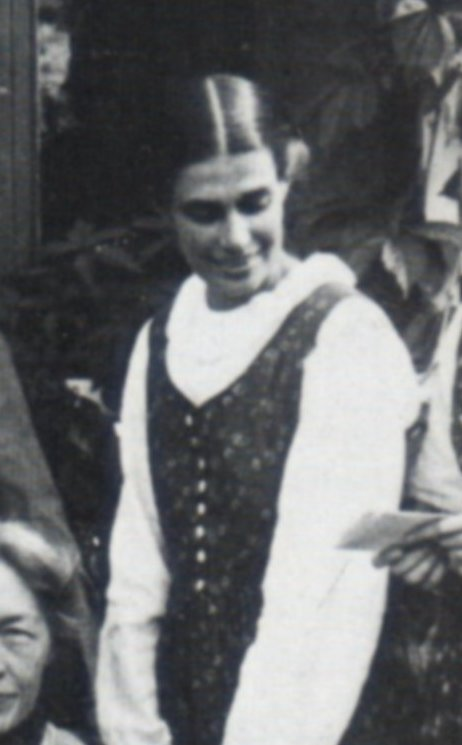
- in 1920s
- Born: 19 October 1886; Ekebyborna parish
- Died: 4 September 1977 (aged 90); Brännkyrka parish
- Known for: headteacher of Kvinnliga medborgarskolan vid Fogelstad
- Spouse: Vilhelm Grønbech

Honorine Hermelin (19 October 1886 – 4 September 1977) was a Swedish headteacher, magazine founder and feminist.

== Life ==
Hermelin was born in Ekebyborna parish in 1886. Her mother Honorine (von Koch) died with in days. She had one sibling and she would gain seven more when her father, Joseph Hermelin, remarried.

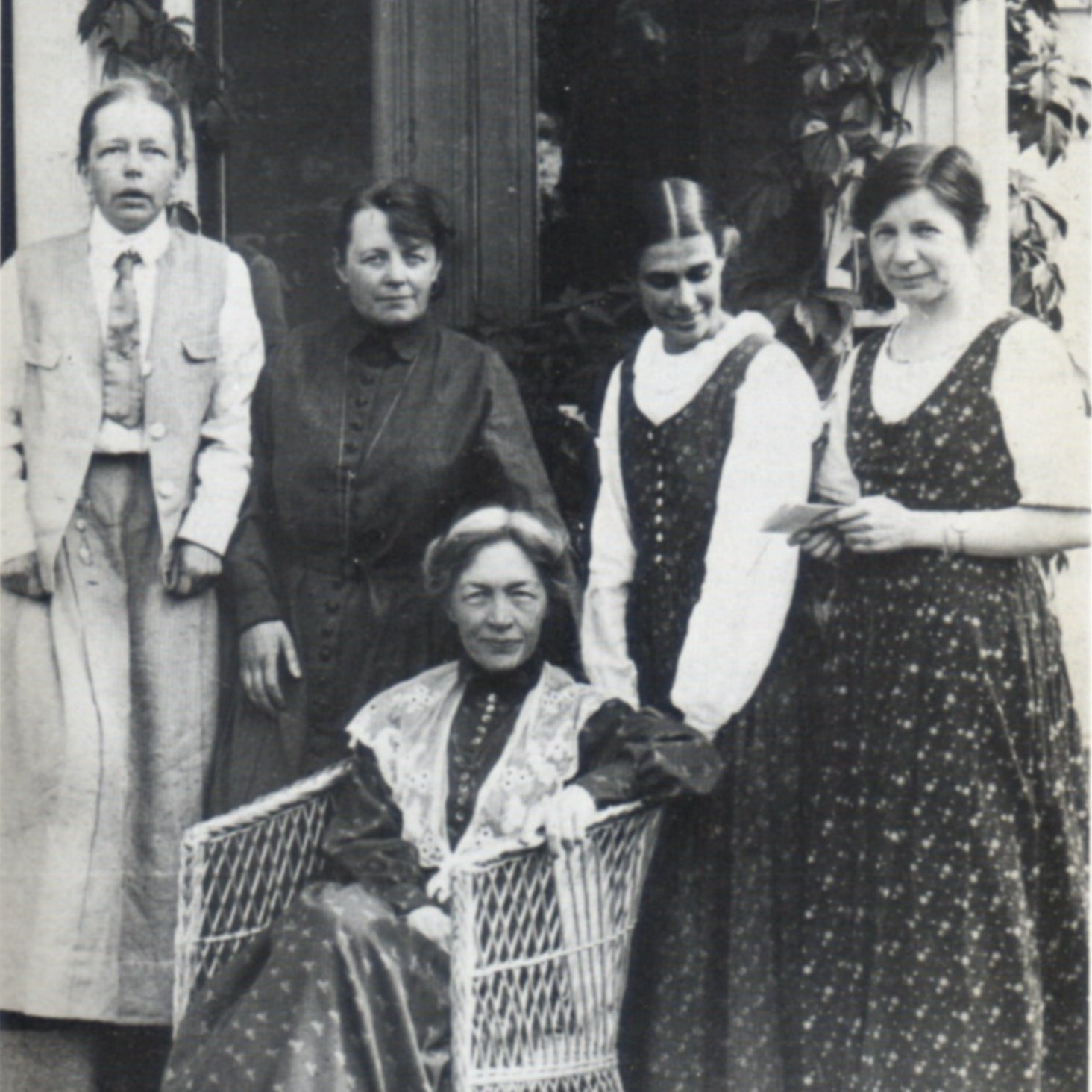
1920s feminists Left to right: Elisabeth Tamm, Ada Nilsson, Kerstin Hesselgren sitting, Honorine Hermelin and Elin Wägner

She qualified as a teacher and taught for over ten years before coming to notice as the headteacher of the Fogelstad Group's school for women. Under her leadership Kvinnliga medborgarskolan vid Fogelstad was known as "Lilla Ulfåsa". It was founded in 1925 and it continued under her leadership until 1954. This led to her coming the first woman to chair a school board in 1932.

The magazine Tidevarvet was founded in 1923 (or 1924) by Kerstin Hesselgren, Honorine Hermelin, who was an educator, Ada Nilsson, Elisabeth Tamm, a political politician, and Elin Wägner, who was an author.

== Private life ==
She married for eight months. In 1947, she married Vilhelm Grønbech but he died within eight months. She had a very close relationship with Ada Nilsson such that during the last year of her life Nilsson came to stay at Fogelstad with Hermelin. Nilsson died in 1964 and Hermelin died in Brännkyrka parish in 1977.

== Recognition ==
The King of Sweden awarded her the Illis quorum.

Siri Derkert created a portrait of her which is now in the Swedish National Museum.
