= Harriet Löwenhjelm =

Swedish artist (1887–1918)

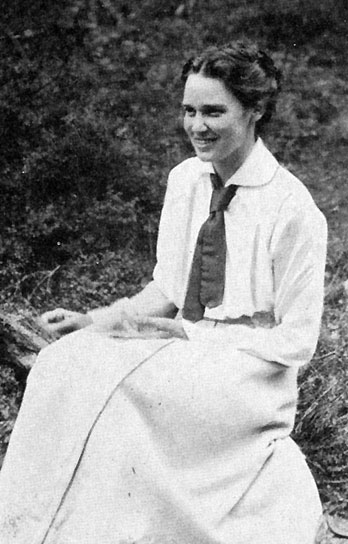
- Born: Harriet Augusta Dorothea Löwenhjelm; 18 February 1887; Helsingborg, Sweden
- Died: 24 May 1918 (aged 31); Småland, Sweden
- Education: Royal Swedish Academy of Fine Arts, Konstakademien
- Occupations: Painter, poet

Harriet Augusta Dorotea Löwenhjelm (18 February 1887 – 24 May 1918) was a Swedish painter and poet. She mainly considered herself an artist. She died at Romanäs sanatory in Tranås after some years of tuberculosis.

== Family ==
Löwenhjelm was born on 18 February 1887, in Helsingborg, in Scania, Sweden. She was the daughter of colonel Gustaf Adolf Löwenhjelm (1842–1929) and Margareta, née Dickson (born 1853). She had five siblings. Her older brother, Carl Löwenhjelm, was a medical doctor, and the younger one, Chrispin Löwenhjelm (1892–1983), was an officer and chamberlain. Her cousin Marianne Mörner was a docent in French at Lund University. She accompanied Löwenhjelm on a trip to Paris and in different ways inspired her in her poetic works. Mörner also introduced Löwenhjelm's poems and pictures into the literary Sweden of the 1920s.

== Education ==
Löwenhjelm studied at Royal Swedish Academy of Fine Arts, followed by Anna Sandström's higher teacher seminary, Kerstin Cardon's drawing school, Konstakademien (1909–1911) and for the previous superintendent of Valands konstskola, professor Carl Wilhelmson.

== Literary production ==
Some of Löwenhjelm's most well-known poems are "Jakt på fågel (Bird hunt), "Tag mig. Håll mig. Smek mig sakta." (Take me. Hold me. Caress me gently.) and "Beatrice-Aurore", which has been set to music by Hjalmar Casserman. Her poems originally were a complement to her drawings. Her later poetry were filled of awareness of death and has a deepened religious dimension. Löwenhjelms poems were published posthumously in 1919.

== Bibliography ==
- Dikter med dem tillhörande teckningar [Poems with accompanying drawings]. 1919.
- Brev och dikter [Letters and Poems]. 1952.
- Harriet Löwenhjelms bönbok [Harriet Löwenhjelm's prayer book]. Stockholm, Sweden: Norstedts förlag. 1963.
- Löwenhjelm, Harriet (2014). Mierzejewski, Ryszard (ed.). Wiersze [Poems] (in Polish). Poland. ISBN 978-83-939134-8-0.

== Literature ==
- Elsa Björkman-Goldschmidt: Harriet Löwenhjelm (1947)
- Elsa Björkman-Goldschmidt (ed.): Brev och dikter, Harriet Löwenhjelm med teckningar av författarinnan (1952)
- Lars Elleström: Från Lenngren till Lugn. En ironisk historia ISBN 9113013874 (2005)
- Boel Hackman: Att skjuta en dront, ISBN 9789100111076 (2011)
