= Jenny Åkesson =

Swedish socialist activist (1867–1941)

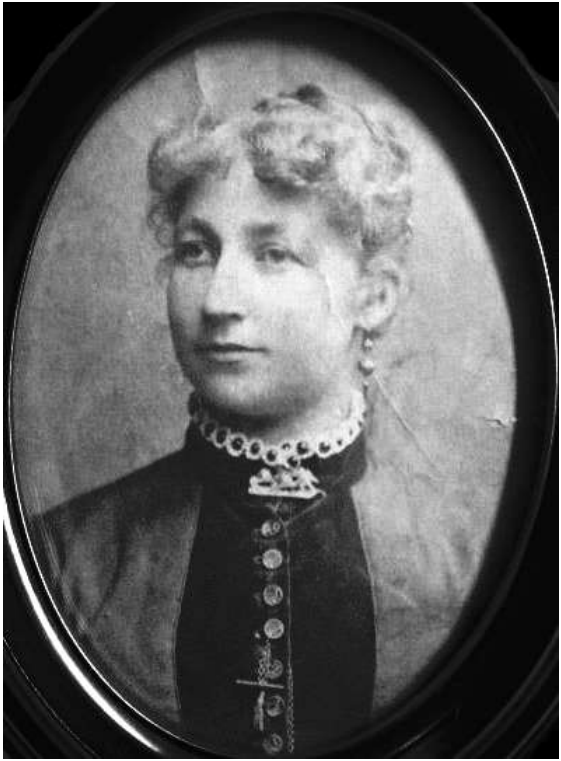
- Åkesson, c. 1890
- Born: Jenny Ellida Åkesson; April 15, 1867; Copenhagen, Denmark
- Died: February 12, 1941 (aged 73); Lund, Sweden
- Burial place: Norra kyrkogården, Lund
- Other names: Jenny Åhlund; Jenny Åkesson Röslid
- Occupations: Maid; housekeeper; political activist
- Known for: Co-founding the Lund women workers' union and the Lund Social Democratic women's club
- Political party: Swedish Social Democratic Party
- Movement: Labor movement
- Partner: Wilhelm Åhlund (1889–1926; his death)
- Children: 5
- Parents: Carolina Åkesson; Hans Åkesson

Jenny Ellida Åkesson (Note: Her middle name is spelled "Elida" in her Copenhagen birth record and in the 1890 census, and "Ellida" in the 1900 and 1910 censuses and in the Svenskt kvinnobiografiskt lexikon.) (April 15, 1867 – February 12, 1941) was a Swedish socialist and labor activist. The daughter of the early Malmö socialist Carolina Åkesson, she belonged to the Malmö women workers' club, the first women's organization in the Swedish social democratic movement, and in 1889 was chosen as one of the bearers of its banner. After moving to Lund, Sweden, she co-founded the city's women workers' union in about 1892 and its Social Democratic women's club in 1906.

Åkesson made the milestones of her private life into public political statements. In 1889, she and the socialist agitator Wilhelm Åhlund rejected both church and civil marriage, instead entering into a union before the Malmö Social Democratic association, an event reported in newspapers across Sweden. The couple announced their first child in the socialist press as "a nihilist girl", a notice that drew widespread coverage, and gave two of their children long strings of names taken from figures ranging from Aristotle to recently executed anarchists. For much of her life, Åkesson lived in poverty, often supporting the family on her own while Åhlund was repeatedly dismissed from work for his political views and was eventually disabled in a workplace accident.

== Early life ==
Åkesson was born on April 15, 1867, at Borgergade 54 in Copenhagen, the daughter of Carolina Åkesson (1837–1890), a cleaner and housekeeper, and Hans Åkesson (1835–1922), a shoemaker. Her parents had moved to Denmark because their religious views were at odds with the Church of Sweden. The Copenhagen parish register recorded the family as Mormons and noted that Jenny had been baptized at home, without giving a date, although the family was most likely atheist. When she was three, the family returned to Sweden and settled in Malmö, where the parish register of Malmö Caroli recorded her and her younger brother, both born in Copenhagen, as illegitimate (oäkta).

The family was poor. Both parents were involved in the emerging socialist movement, and her mother was one of the earliest women active in the Malmö women workers' club and the Social Democratic Party.

In 1887, at the age of twenty, Åkesson took work as a maid, first in Åhus and then in Gothenburg. In Gothenburg she met her future partner Wilhelm Åhlund, a Stockholm-born brass caster thirteen years her senior. Åhlund was a political activist and a colleague of the Social Democrat August Palm.

== Political organizations ==
Åkesson was active in the labor movement in her own right before her union with Åhlund. By early 1889 she was a member of both the Malmö Social Democratic association (Socialdemokratiska föreningen i Malmö) and the Malmö women workers' club (Malmö kvinnliga arbetareförbund), founded in October 1888 as the first women's organization in the Swedish social democratic movement. In March 1889 the club chose her as one of the four women who would carry its new banner, which was to be ceremonially dedicated at a festival.

After settling in Lund in 1890, she continued her work there. In about 1892 she co-founded the Lund women workers' union (Lunds kvinnliga arbetarförbund), one of several short-lived women's clubs formed in the wake of the Malmö club, in which she also served as banner-bearer; the union merged with the Lund Social Democratic association (Lunds socialdemokratiska förening) in the mid-1890s. In 1906 she co-founded the Lund Social Democratic women's club (Lunds socialdemokratiska kvinnoklubb). She remained active in these organizations for as long as her strength allowed, but ill health forced her to withdraw in the 1930s.

== Marriage and family as political statements ==
=== Unconventional marriage ===
Wilhelm Åhlund c. 1906

On the evening of Easter Sunday, April 21, 1889, Åkesson and Åhlund entered into a union before the assembled members of the Malmö Social Democratic association at its fourth-anniversary celebration. Their marriage contract stated that, on account of their convictions, they did not wish to marry before either a clerical or a civil authority. The local press described it as the first socialist wedding in Malmö.

The ceremony was led by the association's chairman, the writer Nils Wessel, a contributor to the newspaper Arbetet. Wessel spoke on the history and meaning of marriage, argued that Social Democrats in particular had to break with existing customs, then read out the contract and declared the couple husband and wife. Both wore black, and Åkesson wore a myrtle crown. The only other ritual was Åhlund placing a ring on Åkesson's finger with the words "As a memento of this day I give this ring to you, my beloved wife!", after which the members cheered the couple. Congratulatory telegrams arrived from comrades in Ystad and from delegates at the founding congress of the Swedish Social Democratic Party, then meeting in Stockholm. (Note: Nyberg dates the ceremony to April 23, 1889, and names Axel Danielsson as the officiant. Contemporary reports place it on the evening of Easter Sunday, April 21, and name the officiant as Nils Wessel, the association's chairman.)

The marriage contract was printed in full in the newspaper Ystads Allehanda: (Note: Translated from the Swedish. The original reads: "Undertecknade, vilka på grund av sina åsigter ej vilja ingå äktenskap inför vare sig prästerlig eller borgerlig myndighet, men dock önska ingå en äktenskaplig förbindelse, fastställa beträffande denna förening följande bestämmelser: Då vårt äktenskap är bygdt på ömsesidig kärlek och ej ingånget för att ernå andra intressen, är det fullkomligt fritt och i den händelse kärleken skulle svalna eller andra omständigheter mellankomma, vilka göra ett fortsatt samliv omöjligt, äga vi båda var för sig full frihet att förbindelsen upplösa; i fall detta oförmodade fall skulle inträffa, skola vi båda gemensamt bidraga till underhållet av de inom äktenskapet möjligen födda barnen; då vi båda, var för sig, åtnjuta s. k. laggifta makars rättigheter, d. v. s. gemensamt äga vårt bo, skola vi, i fall vår förbindelse upplöses, var för sig åtnjuta rätt till halva boet, vilket främst skall komma de möjligen inom äktenskapet födda barnen till godo. Med förestående kontrakt äro vi å ömse sidor nöjda.")

We the undersigned, who on account of our convictions do not wish to enter into marriage before either a clerical or a civil authority, but who nonetheless wish to enter into a marital union, lay down the following provisions for this union:

Since our marriage is founded on mutual love and is not entered into for the sake of any other interest, it is entirely free; and should love cool, or other circumstances arise that make a continued life together impossible, each of us shall have full freedom to dissolve the union. Should this unforeseen case arise, we shall both contribute jointly to the support of any children born within the marriage. As we each enjoy the rights of lawfully married spouses, that is, own our household in common, each of us shall, if our union is dissolved, be entitled to half of the household, which shall above all benefit any children born within the marriage.

We are on both sides content with the above contract.

The contract was drawn up in two copies, signed by both parties and witnessed by two people, and each partner received a copy.

=== Unconventional children's names and birth announcement ===
Åkesson raised her children outside both the church and the legal institution of marriage. Although she signed the family's announcements with Åhlund's surname, in the official records she kept her own name and was registered as unmarried (ogift) in the censuses of 1890, 1900 and 1910. She and the children were listed as a family unit of their own, separate from Åhlund, within the household.

Åkesson and Åhlund had five children: Vera (born 1890, Helsingborg; later Jönsson), Hebert (born 1891, Lund), Signora, known as Signe (born 1894, Lund), Platus (born 1898, Lund) and Hans Georg (born 1909, Lund; later Röslid). (Note: Nyberg's article calls the son born in 1898 the couple's fifth child, but the family listing in the same lexicon names five children with him as the fourth, matching the censuses. The lexicon gives the second child's names as "Herbert Lorens Alvar"; the 1900 census has "Hebert Lorens Alban".) The births of three of them were marked by acts of performative resistance.

==== Vera Josefina Helena (born 1890, Helsingborg) ====
The couple had moved to Helsingborg in 1889, and their first child was born there on February 15, 1890. The parents announced the birth in Arbetet not as that of a daughter but of "a nihilist girl" (en nihilistska), signing the notice "Jenny and Wilhelm Åhlund". (Note: Nihilistska is the Swedish feminine form of nihilist.) The notice was reprinted by newspapers across Sweden, most of them mocking it, and some reading it as an endorsement of revolutionary violence:

Skånska Posten (Kristianstad), February 20, under the heading "Young nihilist girl" (Ung nihilistska): the notice "takes predestination rather far"
Skånska Aftonbladet (Malmö): "a remarkable child to have settled her outlook on life so early"
Bohusläns Allehanda (Uddevalla), February 22, under the heading "A devil of a girl" (En pokkers tös)
Gripen (Södertälje), February 25: "Perhaps the worthy parents' hopes will be put to shame"
Falkenbergs Nya Tidning (Falkenberg), February 26, under the heading "Precocious" (Tidigt försigkommen)
Fäderneslandet (tidning) (Stockholm), February 26: hoped the child would grow up wiser than her parents and see that true freedom could never be won "by the knife and assassination"
Arbetarens Vän (Stockholm), March 7: quoted the notice in a longer attack on socialism and nihilism, hoping that "the pitiable parents'" little daughter would turn out differently

==== Signora Salvadora Cassarina Weilantina Carola (born 1894, Lund) ====
Born on November 8, 1894, she was, like her younger brother, given a long string of names, (Note: Spellings vary between sources. Nyberg spells her fourth name "Veilantina", and the parish register for 1908–1914 records her as "Signora Salvadora Kassarina Veilentina Karola Åhlund Åkesson".) most of which appear to allude to anarchists who were in the news in 1893–94:

Signora – Italian for "lady"
Salvadora – apparently the Spanish anarchist Santiago Salvador, who bombed the Liceu opera house in Barcelona in November 1893 and was executed on November 21, 1894, two weeks after her birth
Cassarina – apparently the Italian anarchist Sante Geronimo Caserio, guillotined in August 1894 for assassinating the French president Sadi Carnot; his name was also given to her brother as Kassarino
Weilantina – apparently the French anarchist Auguste Vaillant, guillotined in February 1894 for bombing the Chamber of Deputies in Paris
Carola – possibly after her activist grandmother, Carolina Åkesson

==== Platus Aristoteles Prins af Marat Ravokol Pallas Kassarino Angeolillo Lusefer (1898–1903, Lund) ====
Born on April 21, 1898, the son was registered as illegitimate and left unbaptized. He died on September 18, 1903, at the age of five. Each of his eight given names (Note: Spellings vary between sources. His names are given as "Platus Aristoteles Prins af Marat Ravokol Pallas Kassarino Angeolillo Lusefer" in the birth register, as "Platus Aristotelus Ravakol Pallas Kassarino Angeolilo Lucifer" (without "Prins af Marat") in the 1900 census, and as "Platus Aristotelus Prins af Marat Ravaskol Pallas Kassario Angeolilo Lusefer" by Nyberg.) carried its own reference:

Platus – apparently Plato, the Greek philosopher (Note: Nyberg writes that Platus "must have" referred to Pontius Pilate, and Andersson and Espvall that it "probably" did. However, the name is immediately followed by his student Aristoteles (Aristotle).)
Aristoteles – the Greek philosopher Aristotle
Prins af Marat ("Prince of Marat") – Axel Danielsson, who signed his articles "Marat" after the French revolutionary Jean-Paul Marat
Ravokol – the French anarchist Ravachol, guillotined in 1892 for a series of bombings in Paris
Pallas – the Spanish anarchist Paulino Pallás, executed in 1893 for a bomb attack on General Arsenio Martínez Campos in Barcelona
Kassarino – apparently the Italian anarchist Sante Geronimo Caserio
Angeolillo – the Italian anarchist Michele Angiolillo, executed in 1897 for assassinating the Spanish prime minister Antonio Cánovas del Castillo
Lusefer – the anarchist magazine Lucifer – ljusbringaren ("Lucifer – the Light-Bringer")

== Hardship and later life ==
For long periods Åkesson supported the home and children on her own. Åhlund traveled as an agitator, and the couple's socialist activity cost him his job several times and the family their home. In February 1890, the month in which Åkesson gave birth to her first child and lost her mother, Åhlund was dismissed once again – in the words of Axel Danielsson, "thrown onto the street with wife and child". In 1902 he lost his left arm in a factory accident, and in 1907 his subsequent post as factory gatekeeper after siding with strikers. Åkesson helped support the household by doing domestic day-work for other families; in the 1910 census she was listed as a housekeeper and Åhlund as a former factory gatekeeper.

From Christmas 1922, illness kept Åkesson from paid work. The couple were then living in a single damp room in Lund that also served as their kitchen, and into which water seeped from the yard in heavy rain, as the syndicalist newspaper Arbetaren reported in 1923 in a profile of Åhlund as "a forgotten veteran" of the labor movement. In October 1923 the local trade-union body, Lunds fackliga Centralorganisation, issued a public appeal for funds for Åhlund, noting that illness in the family had made their situation still more desperate. Åhlund died in Lund on December 1, 1926.

== Death and burial ==
Åkesson died in Lund on February 12, 1941, at the age of 73. In the official death register she was recorded as Jenny Elida Åkesson Röslid, a housekeeper, and as unmarried; the causes of death were given as influenza and chronic myocarditis. (Note: The origin of the name Röslid is not known, but her youngest son, Hans Georg, also later took the surname Röslid. The Svenskt kvinnobiografiskt lexikon gives her civil status as widow, but the 1941 death register records her as unmarried.) She is buried with her partner, Wilhelm Åhlund, in the Northern Cemetery (Norra kyrkogården) in Lund.
