= Carolina Åkesson =

Swedish labor activist (1837–1890)

- Born: Gustafva Carolina Blomström; 7 April 1837; Växjö, Kronoberg, Sweden
- Died: 16 February 1890 (aged 52); Malmö, Sweden
- Resting place: Gamla begravningsplatsen, Malmö
- Other name: Karolina Åkesson
- Occupations: Maid, office cleaner
- Known for: Early Malmö labor movement
- Spouse: Hans Åkesson
- Children: 11; including Jenny Åkesson

Carolina Åkesson (Note: Her name appears with varying spellings across sources, including "Karolina," "Gustava Carolina," "Gustafva Carolina," and "Gustafa Carolina.") (born Gustafva Carolina Blomström; 7 April 1837 – 16 February 1890) was a Swedish socialist activist and one of the earliest women involved in the Swedish labour movement in Malmö. Active in radical circles during the 1880s, she participated in early socialist meetings, supported the agitator Axel Danielsson during his blasphemy trials, and became an early member of the Malmö Women's Workers' Association and the Swedish Social Democratic Party. She and her husband, Hans Åkesson, were religious nonconformists; while living in Copenhagen in the late 1860s, their family's parish registration listed them as Mormons, and after returning to Sweden, Hans was repeatedly noted as holding views contrary to church doctrine. Carolina Åkesson's death in 1890 was marked by a large public funeral in Malmö, when thousands joined a torchlit procession in her honor.

== Early life ==
Carolina Åkesson was born Gustafva Carolina Blomström on 7 April 1837 in Växjö, Kronoberg County, Sweden. (Note: Carolina's birth date is recorded as 7 April in her parish birth record, her mother's household examination record, and the household examination record of her marital household. Some secondary sources list an earlier date.)

Her mother was Maria Theresia Gustava Benjamina Blomström (née Dominic; 1798–1869); no father was recorded in Carolina's birth register. Maria was the daughter of Dominico Martinelli, who came from Naples, Italy, and Anna Catharina Svensdotter of Hjärtlanda parish, Jönköping County. Martinelli was recorded as Catholic and Svensdotter as Lutheran in their daughter's baptismal record. Maria had previously been married to Petter Johan Blomström (c. 1792–1832), a silver- and goldsmith's journeyman. They married in 1818 and had six children before his death from typhus fever in 1832. Maria subsequently had three children outside marriage, including Carolina. (Note: Maria Theresia Gustava Benjamina Blomström (née Dominic, b. 14 February 1798, Brunseryd, Hjärtlanda parish) had nine children: six during her marriage to Petter Johan Blomström (c. 1792–1832), a goldsmith's journeyman, from 1818, and three afterward with unnamed fathers. With Petter Johan Blomström: Frans Johan (christened 25 February 1818); Johanna Christina (christened 23 April 1820); Sven Gustaf Magnus (christened 19 April 1822); Claes Wilhelm (christened 27 January 1825); Annette Elisabeth, recorded in the household register as "Anna Lisa" (christened 6 July 1827); and Carl Frithiof, recorded in the household register as "Karl Fredrik" (christened 30 April 1830). After being widowed in 1832, with unnamed fathers: a son, Fredrik Ferdinand (b. 10 August 1833); Carolina herself (b. 7 April 1837); and Alfred Lorentz Severin (b. 20 March 1840).)

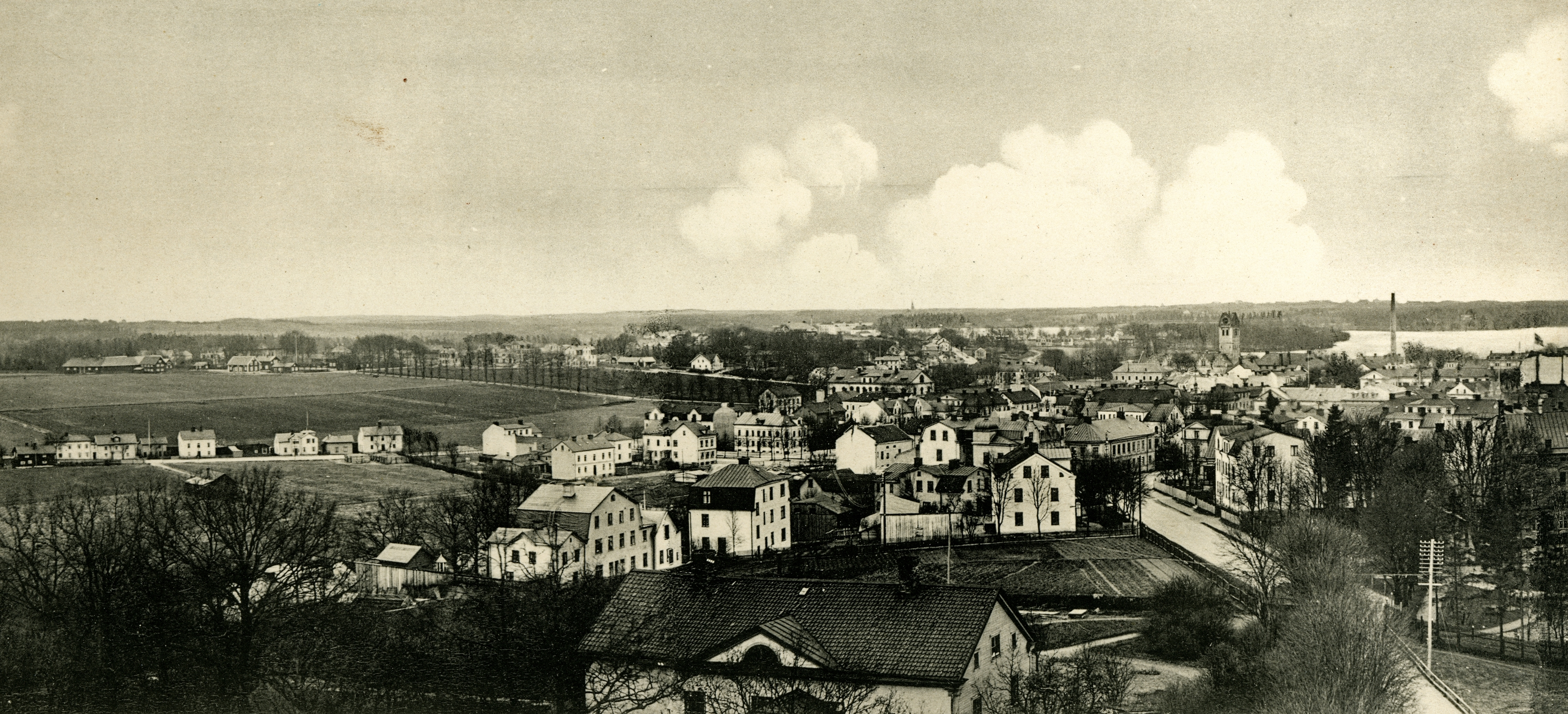
Växjö, ca. 1910s. The conjoined white buildings on the far left were called Palmelund.

At the time of Carolina's birth, the family lived at Palmelund, a multifamily residence in northern Växjö. They moved within Växjö to Christinelund later that year and to Kjellbomska Gränden in 1840. Household examination records describe the family as "utterly destitute" (alldeles utfattig) and record that they received parish assistance for the children's support.

== Children and family ==
At sixteen, Carolina left Växjö for Karlshamn, Blekinge County, where she worked as a maidservant (piga). In 1857, she gave birth to her first child, Anna Wilhelmina. The following year, Carolina returned to Växjö and lived with her mother at Rosenholm farm. There, in 1860, she gave birth to her second child, Ida Mathilda, who died the following year after swallowing a shawl pin (shawlnål). (Note: Carolina had eleven children. With an unknown father: Anna Wilhelmina (b. 26 December 1857, Karlshamn) and Ida Mathilda (b. 12 May 1860, d. 3 May 1861). With Hans Åkesson, whom she married in 1862: twin daughters Ellen Maria and Sigrid Carolina (b. 1863, both died in infancy); an unnamed son (b. and d. 4 May 1866, Copenhagen); Jenny Ellida (b. 15 April 1867, Copenhagen); Olivier Valdemar (b. 24 July 1869, Copenhagen); Elvira Paulina (b. 1872, Malmö); Gustaf Hjalmar (b. 1874, Malmö); and Adolf Leonard (b. 1876, Malmö).)

Carolina married Hans Åkesson (1835–1922), a shoemaker, in Växjö in 1862. In 1863 the couple had twin daughters, Ellen Maria and Sigrid Carolina, both of whom died in infancy. In the mid-1860s, Carolina and Hans moved to Copenhagen, Denmark. There they had an unnamed son in 1866 who died at birth, followed by Jenny Ellida in 1867 and Olivier Valdemar in 1869. The family returned to Sweden by 1870 and settled in Malmö. Carolina and Hans had three more children in Malmö: Elvira Paulina in 1872, Gustaf Hjalmar in 1874, and Adolf Leonard in 1876. All three were baptized together in 1877.

Carolina and Hans remained married until her death in 1890. Hans survived her and died in 1922.

== Religious nonconformity ==
The Copenhagen parish records provide the earliest evidence of the family's religious nonconformity. Denmark's 1849 constitution allowed more religious freedom than Sweden, permitting parents to self-report their religion and their children's baptisms to the parish, rather than requiring baptism by parish clergy. They reported that they were Mormons and their children's baptisms took place at home, with no date given.

After the family's return to Sweden, the Malmö Caroli parish register subsequently recorded both Copenhagen-born children as "illegitimate" (oäkta). Carolina and Hans had three more children in Malmö between 1872 and 1876, but none was baptized until 28 January 1877, a delay of one to five years and far beyond the six-week period then prescribed for infant baptism under Swedish law. In several Malmö Caroli household examination registers spanning nearly two decades, the priest noted that Hans held "views contrary to the Evangelical doctrine" (Har emot evangeliska läran stridande åsigter).

Carolina's anti-religious views became public during the blasphemy proceedings against Axel Danielsson, the socialist agitator and journalist. Danielsson was prosecuted on more than one occasion for religious nonconformity: in 1887, he received a three-month prison sentence for an article in Arbetet, "Till världsalltets upphofsman" ("To the Creator of the Universe"), which mocked the Trinity and ridiculed the clergy; he was later sentenced to four months' imprisonment for blasphemy in connection with a speech on Lilla Kvarngatan in Malmö, judged to have caused general public outrage. Carolina was present in the courtroom for this case, brought him a bouquet as he entered prison, and greeted him again upon his final release on 1 February 1890—just two weeks before her own death.

Danielsson recalled that, during her final days, Carolina feared only that "the priest might have anything to do with her corpse."

== Labor movement ==
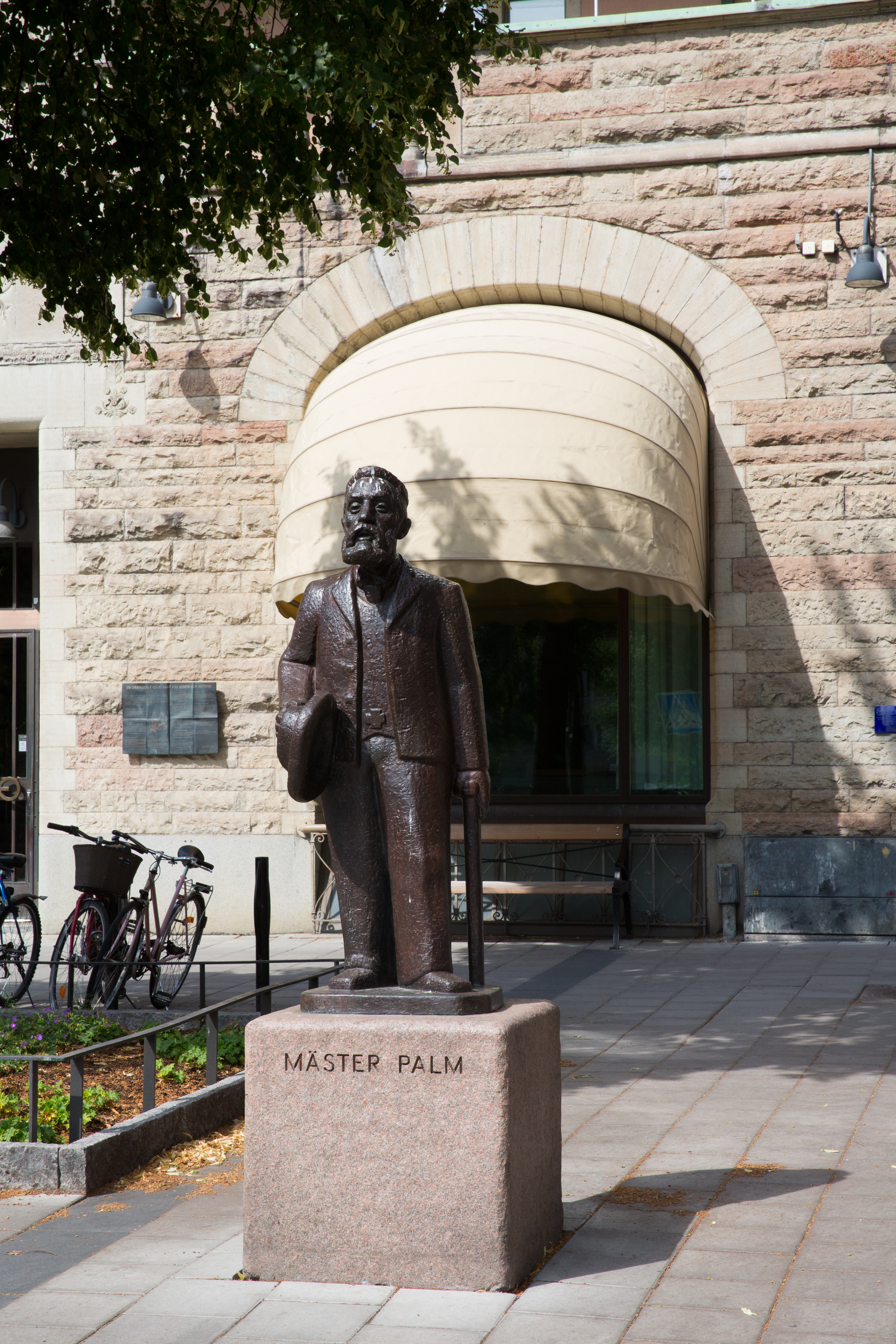
Statue of August Palm in Stockholm

Carolina Åkesson was one of the earliest women active in Malmö's socialist circles. Carolina and her husband, Hans Åkesson, were present at several foundational events in the city's socialist history, including August Palm's 1881 speech Vad vilja socialisterna? ("What Do the Socialists Want?"), which helped initiate organized socialist activity in Malmö. Axel Danielsson recalled that he noticed her at his early lectures because she was the only woman present, and that she attended regularly, later becoming "the soul among the women" who gathered under the socialist banner. Her participation preceded the establishment of formal organizations, and she later became an early member of both the Malmö Women's Workers' Association in 1888 and the Swedish Social Democratic Party in 1889.

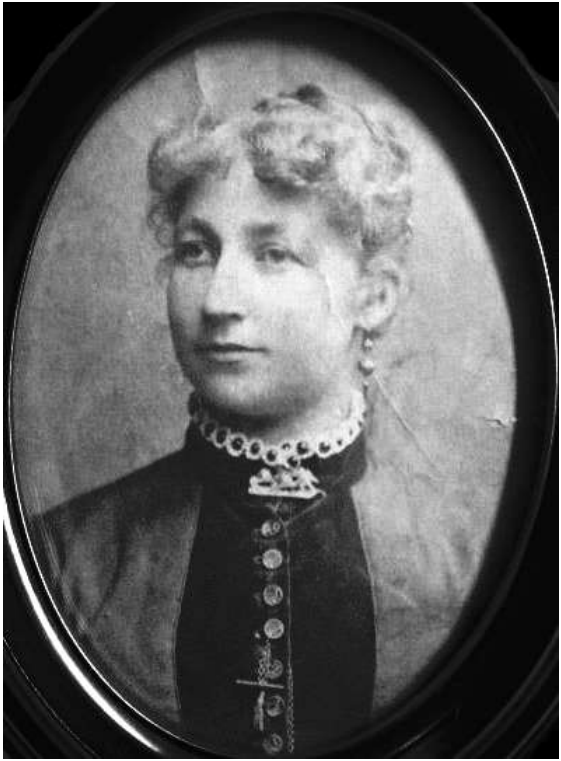
Photo of Carolina's daughter Jenny Åkesson, ca. 1890

Carolina participated in and organized fundraisers. In November 1888, she was listed among the individual and trade-union donors to the newspaper Proletären. In August 1889, she was named to a six-person committee organizing a Christmas bazaar on behalf of Malmö's local Social Democratic Association and the Women's Workers' Union to benefit Arbetet. Among the contributors to the event were her children Elvira Paulina, Gustaf Hjalmar, and Adolf Leonard.

Carolina's daughter Jenny Åkesson became active in the same socialist circles and lived with Wilhelm Åhlund, one of August Palm's closest associates. Jenny went on to co-found the Lund Women's Workers' Union in 1892 and the Lund Social Democratic Women's Club in 1906.

Carolina's activism led to her dismissal from employment. In the summer of 1889, she was dismissed from her position as a cleaner at the liberal newspaper Skånska Aftonbladet after her socialist sympathies became known, a decision Danielsson attributed chiefly to the paper's editor-in-chief, Simon Broomé. Danielsson wrote in her obituary that "the cleaner—both as a human being and a thinker—stood a step higher than the hacks whose dust she wiped." Carolina's daughter Jenny's partner Wilhelm Åhlund was himself dismissed from his job for his views the week before Carolina's death, which Danielsson described as "society's final greeting to Carolina Åkesson."

== Death and legacy ==
Carolina Åkesson died on 16 February 1890 in Malmö Caroli Parish, aged 52. The death and burial register records her under her legal name, Gustafa Carolina Blomström, and lists the causes of death as chronic nephritis and secondary pulmonary edema.

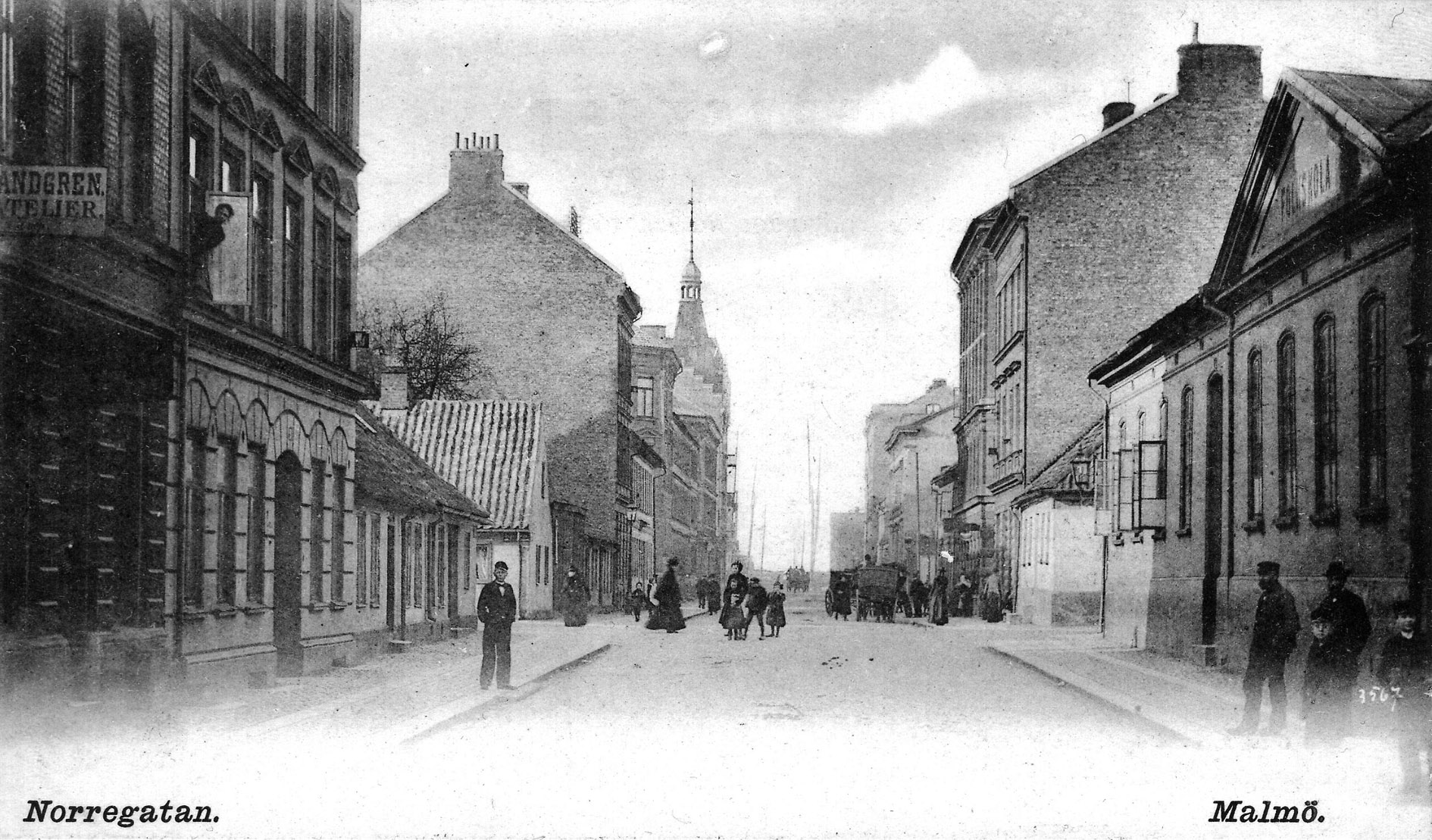
Norregatan in central Malmö, ca. 1900

Her death prompted one of the largest public demonstrations in Malmö during the nineteenth century. Notices circulated through factories and workshops announcing that her funeral procession would be held by torchlight. Thousands of people formed a torchlit procession down Norregatan, a central street in Malmö. She was buried without clergy present on Sunday, 23 February, at Nya kyrkogården (New Cemetery, now Gamla begravningsplatsen, Malmö). Danielsson and members of her family spoke, and a specially composed socialist song was performed. The event was reported in American papers and was remembered as a public tribute to her role in Malmö's early socialist circles.
