= Emilie Rathou =

Swedish journalist, newspaper editor and elected official

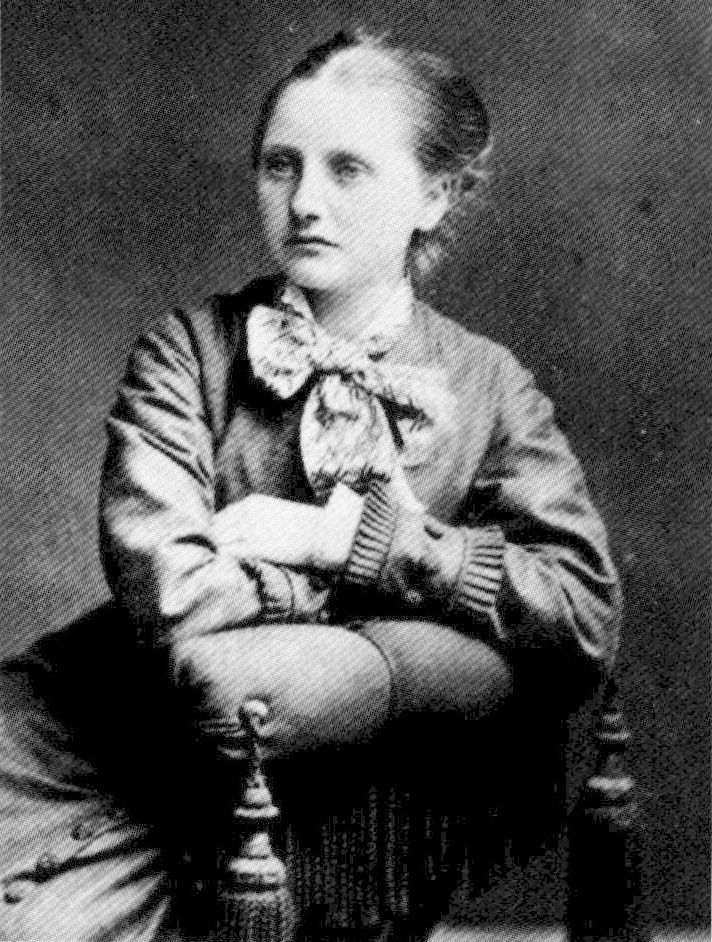
- Born: 8 May 1862; Blekinge, Sweden-Norway
- Died: 12 October 1948 (aged 86); Stockholm, Sweden
- Known for: temperance and women's rights activist

Emilie Rathou, née Gustafsson (8 May 1862 – 12 October 1948) was a Swedish journalist, newspaper editor and elected official. She was a temperance and women's rights activist. On International Workers' Day in Stockholm 1891, she was the first woman in Sweden to demand the right for women suffrage in a public speech. She was the founder of the Swedish branch of the Woman's Christian Temperance Union.

== Life ==
Emilie Rathou was born in Blekinge County, Sweden. She was the daughter of the businessman Albert Gustafsson and Anna Svensdotter. She never married, but changed her surname to Rathou in 1882. She was educated as a teacher in Kalmar. Rathou taught during the period of 1882–85, she was a speaker for the International Organisation of Good Templars in 1885–1900. She was the owner and editor of the paper Dalmasen from 1890 to 1895.

=== Temperance ===
She founded the Östermalm branch of the Woman's Christian Temperance Union, Vita Bandet (The White Ribbon) in 1900, and served as its chairperson in 1900–1935, as well as vice chairperson of the Swedish national Temperance Union in 1902–03, and its secretary in 1903–1947. The Östermalm branch of the Woman's Christian Temperance Union was, in fact, the first Swedish branch of the Woman's Christian Temperance Union: a first Swedish temperance society for women had been created in 1897, but it had in fact no affiliation with the international Woman's Christian Temperance Union. Rathou was therefore the actual founder of the Swedish branch of the Woman's Christian Temperance Union, and she also organized local branches all over Sweden. In 1911–1912, she was a member of a governmental temperance committee.

=== Women's rights ===
Emilie Rathou regarded alcohol and the repression of women as linked, and her engagement in gender equality was linked with her activity in the temperance movement. She supported sexual equality and agitated against both social injustice as well as sexual double standards. During her tours as a speaker for the temperance union, in 1888 she became the first woman in Sweden to speak in public about the introduction of woman suffrage, over ten years before the foundation of the National Association for Women's Suffrage. In 1891, she was the first Swedish woman to do the same in the capital of Stockholm.

In 1893, it was as a representative for the Swedish Social Democratic Party that she became the only female elected to the Folkriksdagen (People's Riksdag), an assembly in Stockholm held 1893–96 to work for the introduction of universal suffrage. Politically, she was initially engaged within the Social Democratic working class movement. In 1892, she founded the Social Democrat women's club Stockholms allmänna kvinnoklubb, which quickly organized several social democratic women such as Alina Jägerstedt, Kata Dalström, Anna Sterky, Anna Lindhagen and Amanda Horney.

A known radical, she was however never quite involved within the organized women's movement, which she criticized for being dominated by upper class ladies, nor did she work for women's issues within the working class movement, which she criticized for not acknowledging the importance of feminist issues, and therefore made her feminist opinions known through the temperance movement.

== Award ==
She was awarded the Swedish Royal Medal Illis Quorum in 1918.

== Other Sources ==
- Bengtsson, Åsa (2010) Emilie Rathou och Vita Bandet: Rabiata och radikala kvinnoröster (Stockholm: Svensk Presshistorisk Förening, p. 28–44, Ellinor Melander, ed)

== Related reading ==
- Hayler, Guy (1914) Prohibition advance in all lands: a study of the world wide character of the drink question (American Issue Publishing Co.)
