= Wilhelm Åhlund =

Swedish socialist agitator (1854–1926)

- Åhlund as pictured in Brand, 1906
- Born: Edvard Wilhelm Åhlund; October 10, 1854; Maria Magdalena parish, Stockholm, Sweden
- Died: December 1, 1926 (aged 72); Lund, Sweden
- Burial place: Norra kyrkogården, Lund
- Occupations: Brass caster; factory gatekeeper; political agitator
- Movement: Labor movement
- Partner: Jenny Åkesson (1889–1926)
- Children: 5

Edvard Wilhelm Åhlund (October 10, 1854 – December 1, 1926) was a Swedish factory worker and socialist agitator who was among August Palm's earliest collaborators in building the Swedish labor movement. After encountering socialism as a young worker in Hamburg, he returned to Sweden in 1881 and spent the following decade organizing, agitating, and raising funds for the Swedish labor movement and its early newspapers. In 1889, he and his partner Jenny Åkesson rejected both church and civil marriage and instead entered into a contractual union before the Malmö Social Democratic association, an event reported across the Swedish press as a "socialist wedding". A self-described political nihilist, Åhlund was repeatedly dismissed from work because of his political views. After losing an arm in a factory accident in 1902, he lived his final years in poverty in Lund.

== Early life ==
Åhlund was born on October 10, 1854, in the Maria Magdalena parish of Stockholm, Sweden. The parish birth register originally listed his parents as unknown but was later amended to identify them as Carl Gustaf Wilhelm Åhlund, a fire stoker (eldare), and Christina Josefina Ekland, following his father's acknowledgment of paternity on January 23, 1857. (Note: A 1906 profile in Brand gives his date of birth as October 19, but the parish birth register and the 1926 death register both record it as October 10.) The eldest of three surviving siblings, Åhlund left school at the age of eleven, worked in a cigar factory, and was then apprenticed as a brass caster (gelbgjutare). After completing his apprenticeship, he worked for two years in Norrland before returning to Stockholm and Södertälje.

In 1875 he moved to Hamburg, Germany, where he joined the tin and metal workers' union and a Social Democratic electoral association and became involved in the trade-union movement and socialism. (Note: Nyberg states that Åhlund encountered socialism while training as a caster in Germany; the 1906 profile in Brand places his apprenticeship in Sweden and his political awakening in Hamburg after it.) After the attempts on the life of Emperor Wilhelm I in 1878 were followed by the German Anti-Socialist Laws and the persecution of socialists, he returned to Sweden in 1881.

== Agitation with August Palm ==
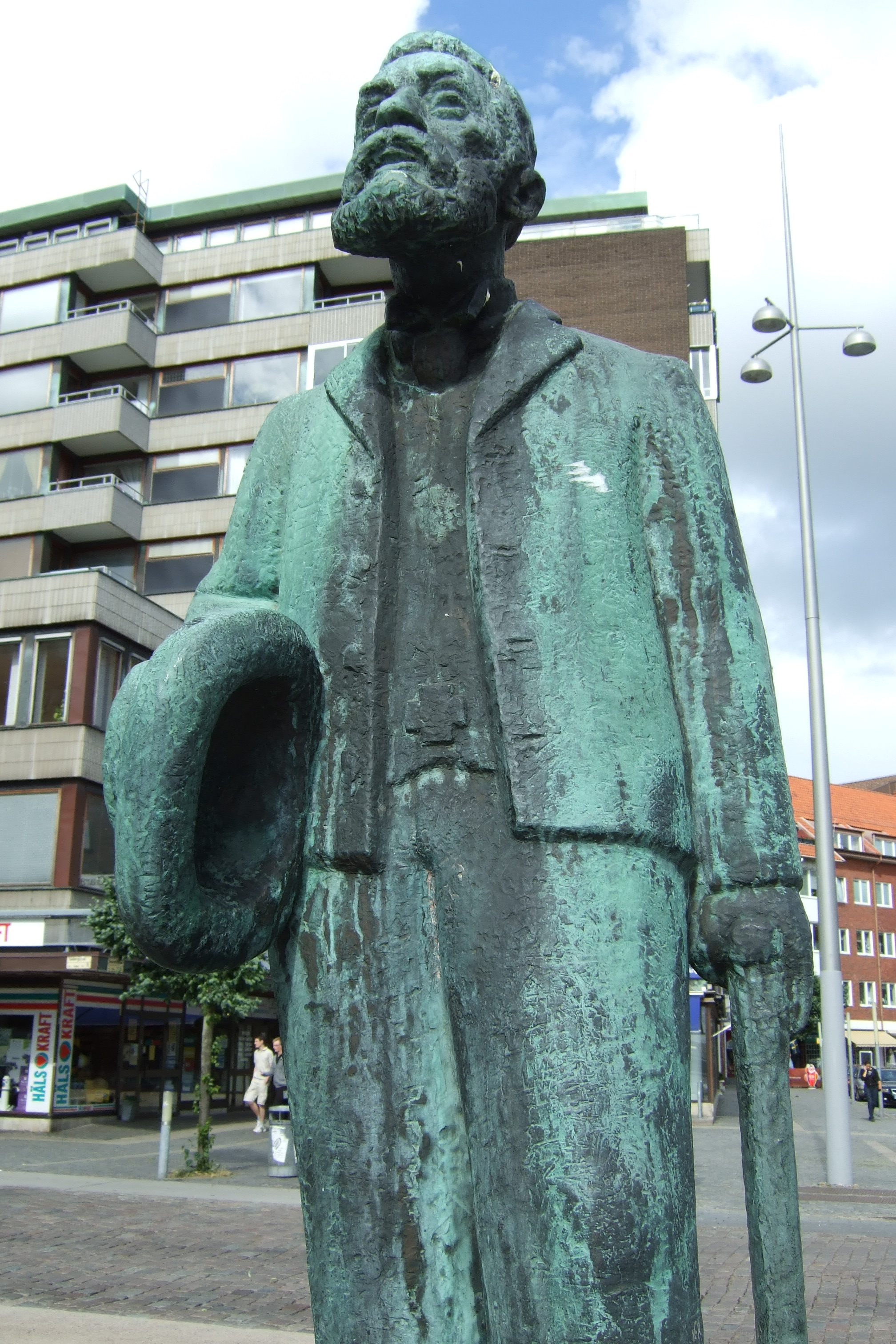
Statue of August Palm in Helsingborg

After returning to Sweden, Åhlund became a close friend and collaborator of August Palm, who had begun his socialist agitation after being expelled from Denmark. On Boxing Day 1881, after Palm had been refused an indoor venue, Åhlund gave the opening address at the first socialist open-air meeting at Lill-Jans in Stockholm. He helped distribute Palm's newspaper Folkviljan, and in 1883, described by the historian John Lindgren as Palm's "faithful comrade-in-arms", he headed a committee in Stockholm that tried to raise money to keep the paper afloat; it nevertheless had to close in mid-July that year. According to a later account, he pawned his best clothes to raise money for Palm. Åhlund and Palm also campaigned against the workers' cooperatives promoted by the spirits manufacturer Lars Olsson Smith, which they regarded as leading workers away from socialism.

Åhlund later founded a socialist club in Sundsvall and raised money to bring Palm to Norrland for his first speaking tour there. In 1883 he entered into correspondence with the Scandinavian socialist association in London and distributed its appeals across Sweden. Palm later described him in his memoirs as a man of complete integrity, who for many years gave everything he earned to the movement and sometimes went without necessities himself.

From 1884 Åhlund worked in Arlöv, outside Malmö, and belonged to the Malmö Social Democratic association. In February 1889 he sat on the jury in the press-freedom trial in Malmö over the pamphlet Lucifer, in which the writer Nils Wessel assisted the defense.

== Union with Jenny Åkesson ==
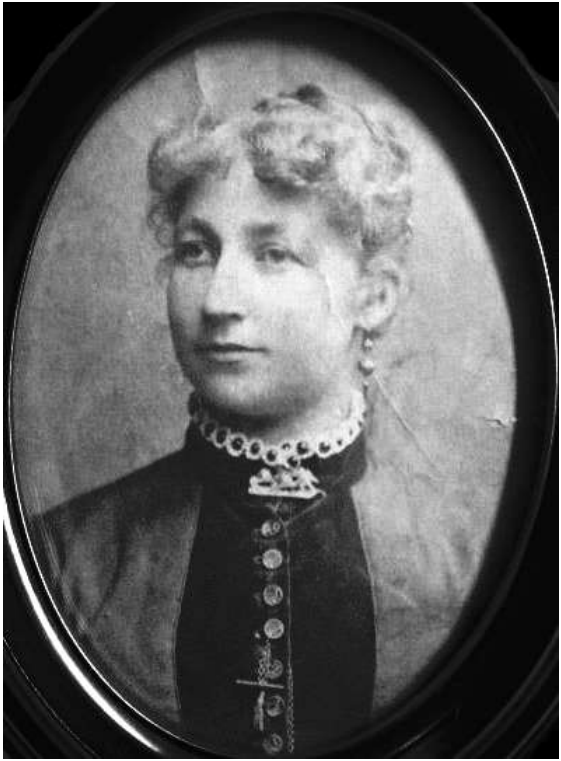
Jenny Åkesson c. 1890

In Gothenburg Åhlund met Jenny Åkesson, a maid thirteen years his junior and the daughter of the Malmö socialist Carolina Åkesson. The couple chose neither a church wedding nor a civil marriage. On the evening of Easter Sunday, April 21, 1889, they instead solemnized their union before the assembled members of the Malmö Social Democratic association during its fourth-anniversary celebration. The ceremony was led by the association's chairman, Nils Wessel, who spoke on the history and meaning of marriage and then read out the couple's marriage contract and declared them husband and wife. Newspapers in Malmö described the ceremony as the city's first socialist wedding. In the contract, later printed in full in Ystads Allehanda, the couple stated that their union rested on mutual love, that either partner was free to dissolve it, and that in that event both would support any children and divide their household equally.

The couple's first child, Vera, was born in Helsingborg on February 15, 1890. Her parents announced the birth in Arbetet as that of "a nihilist girl" (en nihilistska), signing the announcement "Jenny and Wilhelm Åhlund". The notice was reprinted, often mockingly, in newspapers across Sweden. Five days before the birth, on February 10, 1890, Åhlund had once again been dismissed from his job for his views and activities and, in the words of Axel Danielsson, "thrown onto the street with wife and child".

The couple had four more children, two of whom were given unusually long names alluding to prominent anarchists, philosophers and socialist activists. Åhlund and Åkesson remained together until his death.

== Lund ==
In 1890 the family moved to Lund, where Åhlund was registered as a brass caster. He regarded himself as a nihilist, and both his political views and the couple's socialist activism repeatedly cost him employment and led to the family's eviction; he also traveled widely as an agitator, leaving Åkesson to support the home and children for periods on her own.

In November 1902 Åhlund was seriously injured at the tin-goods factory. While standing on a ladder to fit a drive belt he was caught in the belting and flung against the ceiling, and his left arm was severed at the elbow. He received compensation of 500 kronor and was afterwards employed as gatekeeper at the factory, but lost that post after siding with the strikers in a labor conflict there in 1907. In the 1910 census he was recorded as a former factory gatekeeper.

== Later life and death ==
When Palm died in 1922, Åhlund and Åkesson, still living in Lund, sent a letter of condolence that Palm's widow particularly valued. By then the family was living in poverty. In 1923 the syndicalist newspaper Arbetaren profiled Åhlund as "a forgotten veteran", describing how he and Åkesson lived in a single damp room in Lund that also served as their kitchen. Unable to find work, Åhlund survived on a small municipal allowance and a pension of 12.50 kronor per month, and had been in hospital with a chest illness; Åkesson, who had helped support the household by doing domestic work, had been kept from paid work by illness since Christmas 1922. In October 1923 the local union, Lunds fackliga Centralorganisation, issued a public appeal for funds for him, describing him as one of the labor movement's first pioneers and "Palm's best and most loyal comrade", whose disability had long made it difficult for him to support his family.

Åhlund died in Lund on December 1, 1926, at the age of 72. The death register recorded him as a former gatekeeper and as unmarried, and gave the causes of death as cardiosclerosis and bronchitis. He is buried with Jenny Åkesson in the Northern Cemetery (Norra kyrkogården) in Lund.
