= Alina Jägerstedt =

Swedish politician and trade unionist

- Born: 3 June 1858; Stockholm
- Died: 3 November 1919 (aged 61); Stockholm
- Occupations: Tobacco worker, Social Democrat and trade unionist

Alina Josefina Rosalie Jägerstedt (3 June 1858 – 3 November 1919) was a Swedish social democrat and trade unionist. She was the only female member at the congress of 1889, where the Swedish Social Democratic Party was founded. She participated as the representative for the Skandinaviska Tobaksarbetarförbundet (Scandinavian Tobacco Worker's Union). Thanks to the motion she presented at the congress, both sexes were included in the Swedish Social Democratic Party from the start.

== Life ==
Alina Jägerstedt was born in a Stockholm working class family. Her father, police officer Anders Johan Jägerstedt, died shortly after her birth, and her two brothers were placed in an orphanage (Stora Barnhuset) because her mother was unable to support all of her children as a widow. Jägerstedt started to work in the tobacco industry at the age of twelve. After having a child early with a man who abandoned her, she supported both herself, her daughter and her elderly mother alone.

Jägerstedt joined the Skandinaviska Tobaksarbetarförbundet in 1884, the year of its foundation. Not only were there many women in the tobacco industry, but in contrast to other industrial work, women often had more qualified work assignments within this industry, which gave them a stronger position in its union than what was often otherwise the case at the time. Jägerstedt was a member of the union's board and several committees during the 1880s and 1890s, and it was in this capacity she participated in the congress of 1889, when the Swedish Social Democratic Party was founded. During the congress she made a motion demanding women should be included as party members, which was not common for political parties at the time, but was supported by the congress. After the Social Democratic women's club Stockholms allmänna kvinnoklubb was founded by Emilie Rathou in 1892, Jägerstedt, as well as Kata Dalström, Anna Sterky, Anna Lindhagen and Amanda Horney, joined the club.

In 1906, Jägerstedt was appointed member of the Communal Employment Agency in the city of Stockholm, and then referred to as the first working-class woman to be given a position in a municipal council. In 1913, she was elected to the 15th district of the Stockholm Retirement Council. When the Scandinavian Tobacco Worker's Union was nationalized in 1915, she was part of the committee of former members who negotiated compensation for those losing their positions, of which she herself was one. The last years of her life, she managed a tobacco shop with her daughter in Vasastaden.
