= Maria Sandel =

Swedish textile worker, writer, feminist, social critic

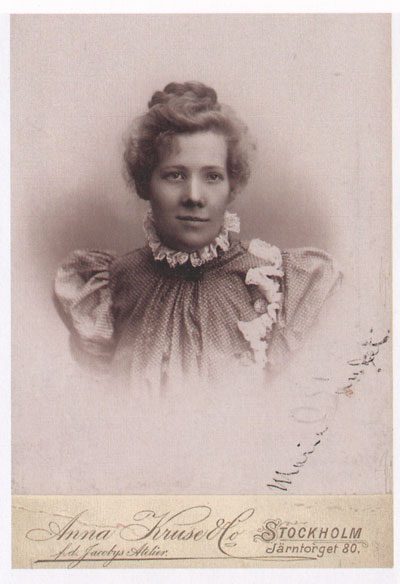
Maria Sandel

Maria Gustafva Albertina Sandel (1870–1927) was a Swedish textile worker, writer, feminist, and social critic. Born in Stockholm, she was forced to leave school at the age of 12, and began to work to contribute to her family income. Despite her lack of formal education, she wrote articles for several journals, and later published her own novels. Often regarded as the Fredrika Bremer of the proletariat, her works are social commentary, especially on the conditions of working-class women.

== Life ==
Maria Sandel was born on 30 April 1870 in Stockholm, Sweden to a unmarried mother. Her mother, Maria Charlotta Killander, was a seamtress, and her father, Carl Gustaf Sandell, a domestic worker. Born into poverty, she grew up in Kungsholmen and was compelled to quit school at the age of 12. Aged 17, she traveled to the US to work as a housemaid, to overcome her family's financial stress. During her four-year stay in the US, she learnt English, German, and French, enabling her to read literary works written in these languages. At the age of 25, Sandel had become deaf like her mother, and together they ran a dairy shop which was later forced to shut down. From 1908, she began to live on her own at a small residence in Mariebergsgata.

Sandel began her writing career by publishing articles in the journal Nordstjernan (The North Star). Soon she also began contributing to other newspapers such as, Social-Demokraten. In 1904 she became the founding editor of Morgonbris together with Anna Sterky. She joined Stockholms Allmänna Kvinnoklubb (Public Women's Club) as a member, and began writing short stories and poems on workers' movement. In 1908, she released first book Vid svältgränsen, an anthology of short stories that had been previously published in several journals. She followed it up with her second novel Familjen Vinge. En bok om verkstadsgossar och fabriksflickor the following year. It was published through Fackföreningarnas tryckeriaktiebolag. Bonnier AB publishing house released a new edition of the book a few years later, making Sandel one of the first working-class authors to get published by a major publishing house.

Sandel's novels were mostly works of social commentary. She was a fierce critic of poverty, women's struggles, and social stratification. In her works, she highlighted the impoverished areas of Stockholm, as well as the lives of women who were disadvantaged, suffering, and poor within the society. Indignation stemming from her own life-style and the conditions under which the working-class people lived became subject matters of her works. Recurring themes included suffrage, exploitation and oppression of women, poor working conditions that they faced, illegal abortions, prostitution, alcoholism, and unmarried mothers, among others. An example is her 1924 novel, Droppar i folkhavet (English: Drops in the sea of people). Some of her works were also drawn from the premises of female solidarity, pride, and fellowship.

Maria Sandel died in Stockholm in 1927.
