= Ruth Gustafson =

Swedish politician, union worker, women's rights activist and editor

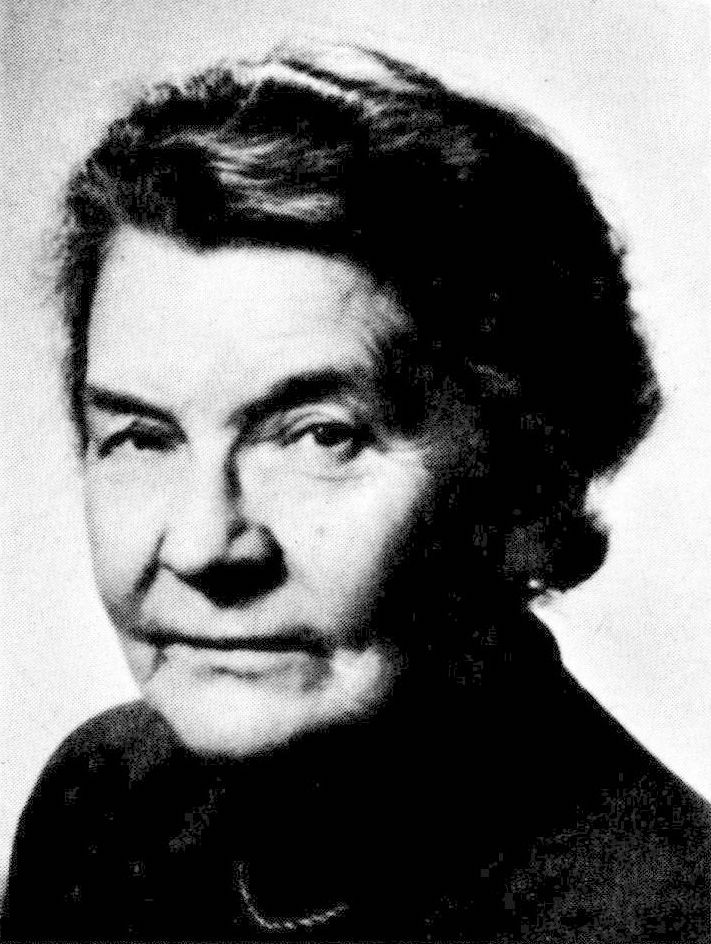
Ruth Gustafson

Ruth Valborg Maria Gustafson née Pettersson (8 July 1881 – 5 April 1960), was a Swedish politician (Social Democrat), union worker, women's rights activist and editor. She was a member of the Stockholm city council from 1919 to 1938, a member of the second chamber of parliament from 1933 to 1960, and editor of the social democratic paper Morgonbris from 1908 to 1910 and 1919 to 1921. She was a member of the National Association for Women's Suffrage from 1902 to 1921, and a speaker of the left wing within the movement.

== Life and career ==
Ruth Gustafson was born to caretaker Fredrik Teodor Pettersson and Anna Lovisa Johansson in Stockholm. She married editor and parliamentarian Hjalmar Albin Gustafson (1883–1961) in 1912 and divorced him in 1934. She was a board member of the Women's Trade Union in 1903–1906, Working Committee of the Social Democratic Women in 1907–1910 and 1917–1920, Chairperson of the Working Committee of the Social Democratic Women in 1908–1910, board member of the Social Democratic Women in 1920–1932 and 1936–1948.

Gustafson was raised in an intellectual working-class home with parents interested in socialism and worker's rights and a father engaged in union work, and she became active in the social democratic movement through its youth clubs in Stockholm in the 1890s. She became a formal member of the Social Democratic party in 1902, and was thereafter active as a speaker for the party, citing Kata Dalström and Anna Sterky as her role models. She was known for her radical views in favor of abolishing the church, in favor of civil marriage, to give legal rights to couples living together without being married (as she herself did with her spouse for six years before she married him), and to protect children from being used for child labor.

Ruth Gustafson was a leading figure of the women's rights movement within the social democratic party and the Swedish working-class movement, where the women normally did not wish to become a part of the women's rights organisations as they were considered to consist mainly of upper-class ladies. Working-class women at this point spoke for their rights through the trade unions for women, and Gustafsson was an important speaker for them within the social democratic party, where the rights of workers were given priority over women's rights, and women's participation in politics, though frequent, was not yet uncontroversial.

Gustafson died in Stockholm in 1960.

== Sources ==
- Tidens kalender 1941, Stockholm: Victor Pettersons bokindustri A.B., 1940, sid. 122.
- Barbro Hedvall (2011). Susanna Eriksson Lundqvist. red.. Vår rättmätiga plats. Om kvinnornas kamp för rösträtt.. Förlag Bonnier. ISBN 978-91-7424-119-8
- Ruth V M Gustafson, urn:sbl:13309, Svenskt biografiskt lexikon (art av Göran Wendel), hämtad 2015-09-05.
