= Gertrud Månsson =

Swedish politician (1866–1935)

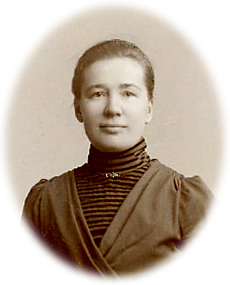

member of the Stockholm city council
- In office 1910–1915 and 1919–1931

chairperson of the Stockholms allmänna kvinnoklubb
- In office 1892–1895, 1897–1898, and 1906–1908

Personal details
- Born: 18 December 1866 Stockholm, Sweden
- Died: 30 December 1935 (aged 69)
- Party: Swedish Social Democratic Party

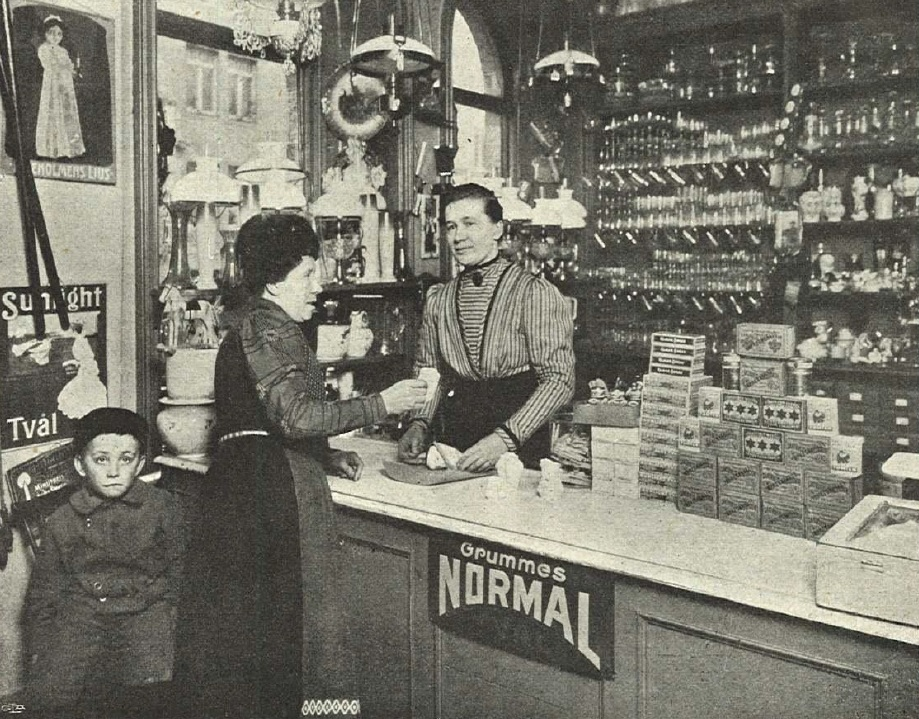
Gertrud Månsson in her shop. Idun magazine, 3 April 1910

Gertrud Carolina Månsson (18 December 1866 – 30 December 1935), was a Swedish municipal politician (Social democrat). She was the first female member in the Stockholm City Council and also the first elected female politician of her country as a whole (1910).

== Life ==
=== Early life ===
Gertrud Månsson was born in Stockholm to the ironworker Johannes Månsson and Charlotta Christina Lindqvist. Because of her poverty, she left school at the age of eleven to support herself as a maidservant. By 1896, she had managed to open her own shop in Vasastaden.

=== Early career ===
Gertrud Månsson educated herself through autodidacticism and engaged herself in politics and the Swedish Social Democratic Party. On 11 June 1892, she became one of the co-founders of the Stockholms allmänna kvinnoklubb, which was the first women's branch of the Swedish Social Democratic Party. She became a member of the Swedish Social Democratic Party the same year, and served as the chairperson of the Stockholms allmänna kvinnoklubb three times: 1892–1895, 1897–1898, and 1906–1908. Between 1897 and 1900, she served as chairperson of the Commune of Female Agitation and as secretary in 1900–1902. In 1902, she was elected to the board of the Women's Trade Union alongside Anna Johansson Visborg and Anna Sterky. Between 1907 and 1922, she was a member of the Gustav Vasa parish poor care board, and its chairperson in 1922.

By a reform in 1909, women became eligible for municipal and city councils in Sweden, and in the following election in 1910, 37 women were elected to city councils and municipal councils all over Sweden, all of them being, in effect, the first elected female politicians of their country. In the Stockholm city council, two women were elected: the social democrat Gertrud Månsson and the right-wing Valfrid Palmgren. As the votes were counted in the capital first, and the votes from the area electing Månsson were counted prior to the area of Palmgren, Gertrud Månsson could be regarded as the first woman elected in Sweden. Månsson had been nominated as a candidate of her party because of her previous assignments in the poor care board.

After the 1910 election, Gertrud Månsson as well as Valfrid Palmgren was interviewed by the magazine Idun, where Månsson commented: "What is to be done, I can not say now, before I have had the time to acquaint myself with the details of the office. But if I can ever in even some degree be of use to better the appalling living conditions, the source of so much discomfort and misery, it would be the greatest joy to me. But me, what can I do, other than what life have taught me?"

=== Member of the city council ===
Månsson had a respected reputation within her party as a wise and independent character with the capabilities of a leader. She has been described as a strong character, correct and reliable with "a warm heart for her class and for those who suffer as well as great knowledge." When she took her seat as newly elected member of the Stockholm city council in 1910, a fellow member of the city council, a wealthy male merchant, asked her if they were acquainted, to which she replied: "Yes, I was in service as a maid to the upper classes and used to buy groceries in your shop, Mr. Grocer!"

During her tenure as city councillor, Månsson focused on issues of social politics and welfare. This was her main interest as a politician because of her background in poverty, and it was also issues regarded as suitable and non-controversial for the first elected women politicians. Her main focus within this issue was the question of housing and living conditions, and she was actively involved in the building projects discussed in the council. Though she seldom spoke and normally kept herself in the background, she informed herself of all questions and acted upon them, and it was said of her: "She belonged to those silent ones who, alongside thousands of others, built our working movement and brought it forward." She was seen as a pioneer within social politics as well as being one of the pioneers of the social democratic women's movement.

She was a member of the Stockholm city council in 1910–1915 and 1919–1931. During her first term, she was a delegate of the poor care board's bureau for the handling of social benefits in 1912–1915 and 1920–1930; a member of the board of the Stockholm city's house of correction for girls in 1912–1916; and a member of the poor care board for social benefit housing in 1917.

Because the members of the city councils received no salary, Månsson was forced to retract her candidacy in the 1915 election because she experienced difficulties in handling both her political assignments and the shop by which she supported herself, but she accepted a nomination to be a candidate in the 1919 election, in which she was re-elected. She sold her shop and started to work as an office clerk at Systembolaget instead.

During her second term in the city council, she served as a delegate of the poor care board's bureau for the handling of social benefits in 1920–1930 and as a member of the child care authorities in 1925–1926.
