= Wermelin =

Wermelin is a Swedish surname. Notable people with the surname include:

- Atterdag Wermelin (1861–1904), Swedish revolutionary socialist, writer and poet
- Lea Wermelin (born 1985), Danish politician
