= Stockholms Allmänna Kvinnoklubb =

Stockholms Allmänna Kvinnoklubb (literally: 'Stockholm Women's General Club') was founded in Stockholm 11 June 1892, and became a part of the Swedish Social Democratic Party the same year. It is referred to as the foundation of the women's organisation within the social democratic worker's movement in Sweden. It was the first social democratic women's club to be officially a part of the party, and the first of many local clubs of the same kind. The club organized the social democratic women within the Swedish working class movement by establishing local women's clubs and enlisting working women in the trade unions.

== History ==
=== Background ===
The first Democratic Socialist Club for women in Sweden was the Kvinnliga arbetarklubben, which was founded by Elma Danielsson in Malmö in 1888. It is regarded as the starting point of the Social Democratic women's movement in Sweden. However, it was temporary and was never formally a part of the Swedish Social Democratic Party (which was not founded until a year later).

While women were accepted as members of the Swedish Social Democratic Party from its foundation in 1889, due to the efforts of Alina Jägerstedt, the party did not initially encourage the foundation of a separate women's organisation within the party. Women's issues were not to be separated from other issues of equality, such as worker's rights, and it was seen as a given thing that women's rights were to be automatically included in the worker's rights movement, hence no need for a separate organisation for women's rights. Local women's socialist clubs never became other more than temporary.

=== Foundation ===
On 11 June 1892, a meeting was held by Social Democratic women in Stockholm to discuss the issue. The meeting resulted in the foundation of the Stockholms allmänna kvinnoklubb. In contrast to the previous local Women's Socialist clubs, it was an official part of the Swedish Social Democratic Party from the start, and thus the beginning of the organized Swedish Social Democratic women's movement.

Fifty-eight women were among the signatures of the foundation of the Club, among them several known women pioneers such as Alina Jägerstedt, who had been instrumental in the inclusion of women in the Swedish Social Democratic Party from its foundation; Lotten Jäderlund, Elsa Löfgren, Elin Engström, Gertrud Månsson and Anna Söderberg. The opening speech was held by Emilie Rathou, who had been the first female 1 May-speaker the previous year. They were soon joined by other well known profiles such as Kata Dalström, Anna Sterky, Anna Lindhagen and Amanda Horney.

=== Women's Agitation Committee ===
In 1897, the club founded the Kommittén för den kvinnliga agitationen ('Women's Agitation Committee'), with the purpose of training women trade unionists who could convince women workers to join the trade unions. In 1903, the Women's Agitation Committee was dissolved and transformed to a trade union for women under the name Women's Trade Union: at also published the Social Democratic women's magazine Morgonbris from 1904.

=== Women Suffrage ===
Between 1902 and 1921, the Club collaborated with the National Association for Women's Suffrage: its foremost representatives in the suffrage movement were Anna Lindhagen and Ruth Gustafson.

Internationally the Socialist- and labour movement did not generally support cooperation with the First wave women's movement, because it was seen as a given thing that women's rights were to be included in the struggle for worker's rights and the Socialist movement. The Swedish Social Democratic women became an exception when they chose to collaborate with the National Association for Women's Suffrage and its local branches: they became valuable ally, as they already had a network of well organized local women's club all over the nation.

During World War I, the Club also supported the pacifist association founded by the suffrage association.

=== Women's Congress ===
One of the most important tasks of the Club was to organize local women's clubs all over the country. From January 1907 onward, the Club arranged a national women's congress (Kvinnokongressen), attended by representatives from each local club, every third year.

In 1920 all local women's club, including the Stockholm Club, united to replace the three-yearly Women's Congress by one organisation: the Social Democratic Women in Sweden.
