= Malmö kvinnliga diskussionsklubb =

Swedish political organization

Malmö kvinnliga diskussionsklubb ('Malmö Women's Discussion Group') was a Social Democratic association for working women in Malmö in Sweden between 1900 and 1922. It was affiliated with the Malmö Party branch of the Social Democratic Party as well as the newspaper Arbetet. It played a pioneering part in the Swedish women's labor movement.

== History ==
It was founded to replace its predecessor Kvinnliga arbetarklubben and included many of the members of the former. Among its members where Elma Danielsson, Maria Wessel, Anna Stenberg, Mathilda Persson and Sigrid Vestdahl. At the time, there were only a few women's clubs for women within the workers movement, because the view within the labor movement was that women's rights should be naturally included in the labor movement and that it should not be necessary to organise specific associations for women and their issues.

The purpose of the club was to inform and educate worker women intellectually as well as organise them politically and within trade unions. The club arranged parties, concerts, charity fairs, hosted debates, lectures and speeches. Two of the favorite issues of the club were the Temperance movement and women's suffrage. The club supported the Temperance movement, but the issue of suffrage were more complicated: while suffrage were seen as the final ideal, one fraction believed that many women were still not informed enough to vote. In 1909, when women became eligible to the city council, the club campaigned for more women in policial office. During the hunger demonstrations of 1917, the club applied for reduced sentences for women who had been arrested.

In 1922, it was dissolved and transformed in to the Malmö local branch of the Social Democratic Women in Sweden.
