= Elin Engström =

Swedish politician and trade unionist (1860–1957)

member of Kommittén för den kvinnliga agitationen
- In office 1900–1901

member of Socialdemokratiska kvinnokongressen
- In office 1908–1914

Personal details
- Born: 1 January 1860
- Died: 1 September 1957 (aged 97)
- Party: Swedish Social Democratic Party
- Known for: co-founder of the National Association for Women's Suffrage

Augusta Eleonora "Elin" Engström (1860–1957) was a Swedish politician (Social Democrat) and trade unionist. She belonged to the pioneers of the labour movement, the Social Democratic movement, as well as the trade unionism and women's rights movement within the Social Democratic labour movement in Sweden.

== Life ==
Elin Engström was the daughter of the bath house attendant Fredrik Carlsson; her mother was also employed as a bath house attendant. In 1878, she married the Cooper (profession) and trade unionist Jöns Engström.

Her husband died of tuberculosis, and she was left to support their six children alone. She supported herself with several temporary jobs such as writing letters on behalf of others, washing clothes and babysitting, but was still forced to place two of her children in an orphanage: at that time, it was common for poor parents to place their children in orphanages temporarily for economic reasons, and take them back when they could afford to take care of them.

From 1886 to her retirement in 1935, she worked as an office clerk on the Social Democratic newspaper and organ Social-Demokraten. Initially, this was a temporary volunteering work (the paper itself barely keeping afloat), but eventually, the paper was thriving along with the labour movement, and in 1904, Elin Engström was given a permanent position as the chief of the paper's subscription- and distribution office and was able to support herself as such.

=== Political career ===
Her husband was a co-founder of the Cooper Trade Union as well as pioneer member of the Social Democratic Association, and a co-founder when the association was transformed into a political party in 1889.

She was one of the first few women to become a member of the Social Democratic Association before it was organized into the Swedish Social Democratic Party in 1889. In 1892, she was one of the co-founders and first members of the Stockholm Women's Public Club. She was a member of Kommittén för den kvinnliga agitationen (Committee of Female Agitation) in 1900–1901, member of Socialdemokratiska kvinnokongressen (Social Democratic Women's Congress) in 1908–1914, accountant of the Socialdemokratiska kvinnokongressen in 1914–1920, accountant of the Social Democratic Women in Sweden in 1920–1936, board member of the Communal Retirement Board of Stockholm 1917–1935, and board member of the Communal Housing Board of Stockholm in 1917–1923.

In 1902 she, Anna Branting, and Erika Lindqvist were among the Social Democratic women who co-founded the National Association for Women's Suffrage and supported the cooperation of the Social Democratic Women with the suffrage movement.
