= Osberg =

Osberg is a surname. Notable people with the surname include:

- Carl A. Osberg (1920–1942), American pilot
- Lars Osberg, Canadian economist
- Maria Osberg (1864–1940), Swedish politician
- Sally R. Osberg (born 1950), American business executive
- Sigurd Osberg (born 1933), Norwegian Lutheran bishop
