= Bengt Lidforss =

Swedish scientist and writer (1868–1913)

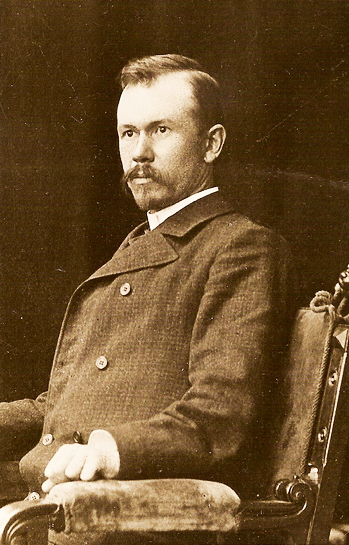
Bengt Lidforss

Bengt Lidforss (15 September 1868 – 23 September 1913) was a prominent Swedish botanist, socialist, and an accomplished natural scientist and writer.

== Biography ==
Lidforss was born in Lund, Sweden, the son of professor and philologist Edvard Lidforss. He studied at the Cathedral School before going to study botany and biology at Lund University under Frederic Areschoug and received his B.A. at nineteen. He studied speciation in the blackberry (Rubus sp.). In 1892 he spent some time at the University of Tübingen under Albrecht Zimmermann. For his Ph.D. from Lund University he studied elaiospheres in the mesophyll. He noted that the plants that remain green in winter in southern Sweden had little starch in the leaves during winter. They instead had oil or sugars which prevented injury to the cells from freezing. With a Battram travel scholarship he went to Germany and spent some time in Berlin. Here he joined the Scandinavian circle around August Strindberg. He then went to Leipzig, working with Wilhelm Pfeffer. After working as an assistant of Ernst Stahl at the University of Jena, he became a professor of botany at Uppsala University in 1909 and at Lund University in 1910. He was among the first Swedish scientists to write popular science. Lidforss was born in a conservative family but developed a strong stance against religion and the Church of Sweden. He published articles in Malmö-based social democrat newspaper Arbetet and also, served as its editor-in-chief.

Lidforss was influenced by Strindberg into writing, and was one of the first intellectuals in Sweden to become a socialist; he was also a pessimist on capitalism. He was known to be bisexual. He was a race mystic who introduced Darwinian ideas which he called as Proletarian anthropology. The Swedish labour movement was noted as anti-Semitical in that they looked upon Jews as capitalist. Lidforss also noted that Jewish culture was distinct and not native in its essence. Lidforss suffered from syphilis from an early age and in 1913 he was diagnosed with syphilitic aortitis which led to his death.
