= Anna Stenberg =

Swedish politician and suffragist

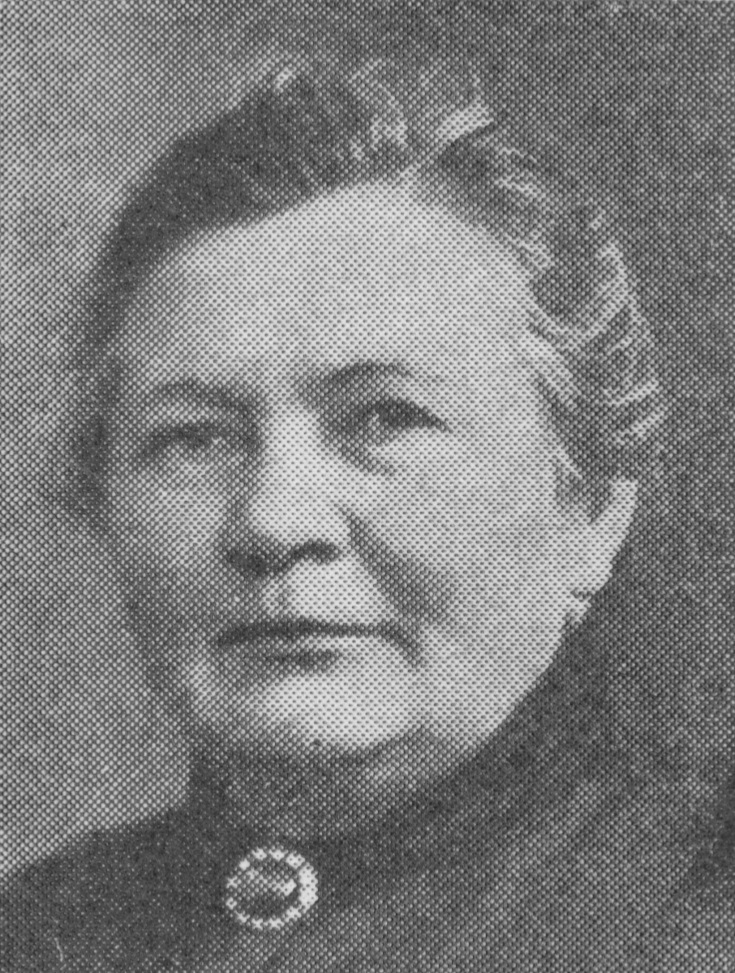
- Born: 25 July 1867; Brönnestad, Sweden
- Died: 21 February 1956 (aged 88); Malmö, Sweden
- Occupation: Politician

Anna Stenberg (25 July 1867 – 21 February 1956) was a Swedish politician and suffragist who represented the Social Democratic Workers' Party of Sweden from 1911 to 1918. She was the chairwoman of Malmö kvinnliga diskussionsklubb, and the first woman to serve on the Malmö town council.

== Life ==
Anna Stenberg was born on 25 July 1867 in Brönnestad, Sweden. Abandoned by her mother Cecilia Bengtsdotter at an early age, she was raised in Röshult, a small town in the north-west of Hässleholm by her foster parents. In the late 1880s, she had moved to Malmö, where she became a nurse at a psychiatric hospital. In 1892, she married Lars Olsson Stenberg, who was an orderly at the hospital. The couple had three daughters together. Working amidst poverty, suffering, and horrific conditions at the hospital, she sought to improve the poor living conditions of people.

In 1900, Stenberg became a member of the Malmö kvinnliga diskussionsklubb (Women's Discussion Group), which served as a political platform for discussions about women's suffrage, education, health, and other societal conditions. The group later joined hands with the Malmö Workers' Cooperative that was founded in 1901, and Stenberg was elected to the workers' cooperative. During the periods 1907–1909, 1912–1913, and 1923–1926, she served on its board. The Women's Discussion Group was subsequently renamed to the Malmö socialdemokratiska kvinnoklubb (Social Democratic Women's Club). Stenberg served as its chair from 1915 to 1916.

During this time, she was active in Malmö's workers' movement. In connection to municipal politics after 1910, she became the first woman to serve on the Malmö town council. From 1911 to 1918, she was a representative of Social Democratic Workers' Party of Sweden. At the 1919 election, she was re-elected and remained on the Malmö town council until 1926.

She was an active campaigner for women's suffrage, serving on the Föreningen för Kvinnans Politiska Rösträtt (Society for Woman Suffrage) for several years.

Stenberg died in Malmö, on 21 February 1956.
