= Elma Danielsson =

Swedish journalist and politician

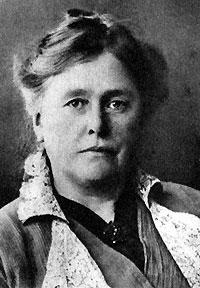
- Born: 1 March 1865; Falun
- Died: 8 February 1936 (aged 70); Lomma
- Other name: Elma Sundquist
- Occupation: Journalist
- Known for: the first woman in the social democratic press, and the founder of Kvinnliga arbetarförbundet and Malmös kvinnliga diskussionsklubb.
- Spouse: Axel Danielsson
- Children: Atterdag Sundquist

Elma Danielsson née Sundquist (1 March 1865, Falun - 8 February 1936, Lomma), was a Swedish journalist and politician (Social Democrat). She was a temporary editor of the social democratic paper Arbetet from 1887 onward, and has been referred to as the first woman in the social democratic press.

== Life ==
Elma Danielsson was born in Falun. She worked as a teacher in the public school system and moved to Malmö with her fiancée Axel Danielsson, with whom she had an on and off relationship from their engagement in 1881 onward - they married sixteen years later, in 1897. The couple had a son together, Atterdag (1891-1895).

Danielsson published the radical social democratic paper Arbetet in Malmö, and Elma participated in the paper as a journalist from 1887 onward. When Axel was imprisoned for blasphemy in 1889, she managed the paper until his release in 1890. In 1891, she moved to the United States, but returned to Sweden in 1895. August Strindberg reportedly once remarked to Danielsson that he was lucky to have "a fiancee with a spark".

Danielsson was a driving spokesperson of women's rights within the Swedish working-class movement: she was the founder of the Kvinnliga arbetarklubben (Women's Worker's Association) in 1888, the first socialist organisation for women workers in Sweden, and served as its chairperson in 1888–90. She was also a co-founder of the Malmö kvinnliga diskussionsklubb (Malmö Women's Discussion Club) in 1900.

After women became eligible to municipal elections in 1909, Danielsson became the first woman elected to the Malmö City Council.
