= Women's Trade Union =

Trade union in Sweden

- Kvinnornas fackförbund
- Founded: 1902
- Dissolved: 1909
- Location: Sweden
- Members: 1,037 (1906)
- Key people: Anna Sterky, Kata Dahlström
- Affiliations: Swedish Trade Union Confederation (1904-1909)

The Women's Trade Union (Swedish: Kvinnornas fackförbund) was a trade union in Sweden organizing female workers between 1902 and 1909. Its members were generally seamstresses, but the union also had a presence in other women-dominated sectors. In the year of its foundation, the union had 642 members. As of 1906, the union had 32 sections with a combined membership of 1,037.

== Early period ==
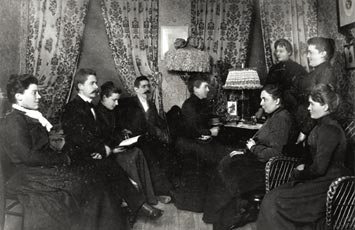
1902 meeting of the Committee for Women's Agitation, the precursor of the Women's Trade Union. The meeting was held at the Sterky residence. Kata Dahlström is seen of the left.

In 1897 a Committee for Women's Agitation had been formed by Stockholms allmänna kvinnoklubb. The committee was reorganized as the Women's Trade Union in 1902. At that time women were not allowed to join the Swedish Tailoring Workers Union, and the new union was founded as a reaction to this. The Women's Trade Union was intended as a transitional organizational, organizing union clubs that were unable to join established unions. At the founding of the union a board was elected, including Anna Sterky, Anna Johansson-Visborg and Gertrud Månsson.

== LO affiliate ==
The Women's Trade Union joined the Swedish Trade Union Confederation (LO) in 1904.

A women's club had been formed at the LM Ericsson in Stockholm, after visits from Anna Sterky and Kata Dahlström. The LM Ericsson women's club affiliated itself to the Women's Trade Union in 1905.

The Women's Trade Union issued a proposal to the 1906 LO congress, that the trade union movement ought to pay more attention to agitation amongst working women and that special women's meetings be organized. The proposal was, however, not approved by the congress.

After the decision of the Swedish Tailoring Workers Union to allow women to become members, a competition emerged over which union seamstresses should belong to. In 1909 the Women's Trade Union was disbanded, and twelve of its sections joined the Swedish Tailoring Workers Union.

== Publication ==
In 1904 the Women's Trade Union began publishing Morgonbris ('Morning Breeze'). It was initially a quarterly, but was converted into a bimonthly in 1906. After the disbanding of the Women's Trade Union, the publication was taken over by the Social Democratic Women's Congress.

== Banner ==
In 1904 the union obtained its own banner. The banner was designed by Selma Sandberg. It was made of wool, with embroidered text.

== See also ==
- Stockholm Housemaid Union
