= Ny Tid (Gothenburg) =

Swedish news magazine (1892–2017)

- Categories: Political magazine
- Founder: Fredrik Sterky
- Founded: 1892
- First issue: 24 March 1892
- Final issue: 3 March 2017
- Country: Sweden
- Based in: Gothenburg
- Language: Swedish

Ny Tid (Swedish: New Times) was a Swedish language news magazine published in Gothenburg between 24 March 1892 and 2017 with some interruptions.

== History and profile ==
The magazine was established by Fredrik Sterky in Gothenburg in 1892, and its first issue appeared on 24 March that year. Sterky also edited the magazine from its start in 1892 to 1898. It was initially marketed as "Journal for the class-conscious workers' movement in West-Sweden" and appeared as a weekly or daily paper from time to time. In the 1940s Sven Backlund, father of the Swedish diplomat Sven Backlund, worked for the magazine as a foreign editor. The magazine folded in 1966, and its circulation was taken over by the Malmö-based social democratic daily Arbetet. Although it was later restarted in 1993 and in 2006, it ceased publication after the publication of the issue dated 3 March 2017.
