= Maria Osberg =

Swedish politician and trade unionist

Maria Osberg (also Maria Osberg-Wessel; 6 December 1864 – 17 February 1940) was a Swedish politician (Social Democrat) and trade unionist. She belonged to the women pioneers of the labour movement, the Social Democratic movement, as well as the trade unionism and women's rights movement within the Social Democratic labour movement in Sweden. She was active within the organisation of women workers within the trade unions.

She was a co-founder of the Kvinnliga arbetarklubben in 1888 and its chairperson 1890–1892, and co-founder of the Malmö Kvinnliga Diskussionsklubb in 1900. In Stockholm she was active in the Allmänna Kvinnoklubben. Maria Osberg supported women's issues specifically both as a trade unionist as well as within the party: as a trade unionist, she particularly organised women, and as a social democrat, she worked closely with the women's suffrage movement.

== Life ==
Osberg was born on 6 December 1864, Sallerup, in Scania. Her father was a landscape architect, and her mother died when Maria was seven. Osberg trained as a seamstress, which involved her in the worker's union movement, in Malmö. She attended the September 1888 meeting which led to the establishment of a society specifically for women members of the Social Democratic party, which then became the female worker's association, the Malmö Kvinnliga arbetareförbund. Osberg her partner Nils Wessel through the social democratic party. Wessel was chair of the SDP and supported women leading their own organisation. Osberg was chair of the association for female workers in 1890–1892. The association was charged with illegally supplying alcohol at social event, and when she was unable to pay the fine, and the Social Democratic Party would not support her, she spent eight days in prison in March 1891. Osberg was also co-founder of the Malmö Kvinnliga Diskussionsklubb.

In 1900 or 1901 Osberg moved to Stockholm, where she was active in the Allmänna Kvinnoklubben and worked closely with the suffrage movement. She had a daughter in 1894, who became an actress. Osberg died on 17 February 1940 and is buried with Nils Wessel, who died the same year, in Bromma cemetery.
