= Skånska Dagbladet =

Swedish daily newspaper

- Type: Daily newspaper
- Format: Tabloid
- Publisher: Skånska Dagbladet AB
- Founded: 1888
- Language: Swedish
- Headquarters: Malmö
- Country: Sweden
- Website: Skånska Dagbladet

Skånska Dagbladet is a newspaper based in Malmö, Sweden, that has been in circulation since 1888.

== History and profile ==
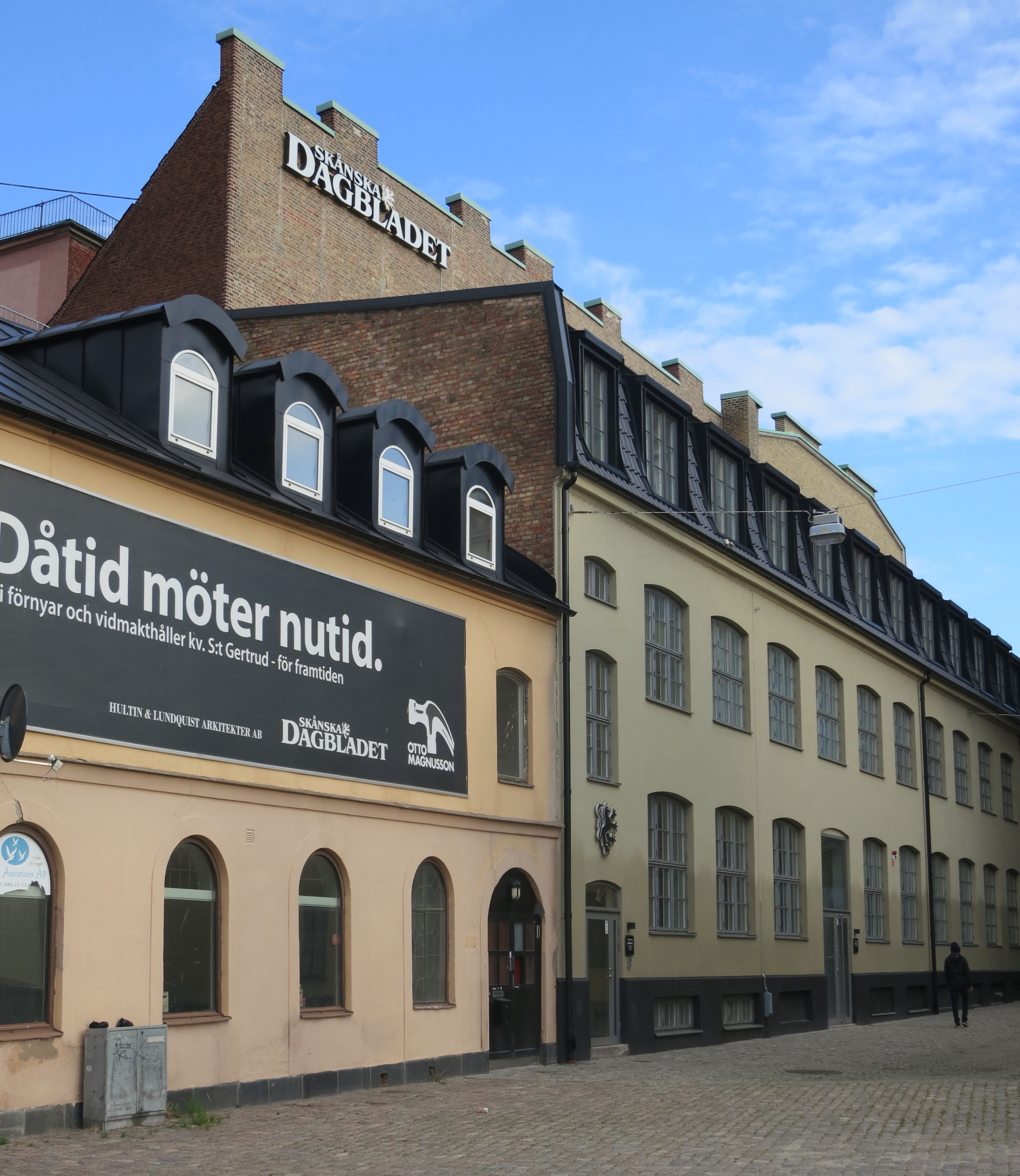
Skånska Dagbladet headquarters in Malmö

Skånska Dagbladet was established in 1888, and its headquarters is in Malmö. The Skånska Dagbladet AB is the publisher of Skånska Dagbladet. During the initial period the paper had four pages with six columns each. In the first quarter of the century the paper was acquired by the Agrarian Party.

Skånska Dagbladet is close to the Centre Party. The paper is published in tabloid format.

=== Circulation ===
At the beginning of the twentieth century, its circulation expanded, being one-twentieth of the entire Swedish daily newspaper circulation. In the mid-1930s Skånska Dagbladet managed to sell more copies than the other Malmö papers Arbetet and Sydsvenska Dagbladet. However, it lost its position towards the mid-1950s.

In 2002 Skånska Dagbladet was the eighth best-selling newspaper with a circulation of 43,600 copies. It was the eighth largest newspaper in Sweden in terms of readership in 2009.
