= Folkviljan =

Swedish newspaper (1882–1885)

- Founder: August Palm
- Editor-in-chief: August Palm
- Founded: 4 March 1882
- Ceased publication: 1885
- Political alignment: Social democrat
- Language: Swedish
- Headquarters: Malmö
- Country: Sweden

Folkviljan (Swedish: People's Will) was a newspaper published in Malmö, Sweden, between 1882 and 1883. It is known as the first social democratic publication in Sweden. It is also known for its founder and editor August Palm.

== History and profile ==
Folkviljan was established by August Palm in Malmö in 1882. Its first issue appeared on 4 March that year. Palm also edited the paper. In addition, all articles were written by him until 1884 when Henrik Menander was hired as editorial secretary. Folkviljan was one of the publications affiliated with social democrats. It featured the first socialist program in Swedish. The paper temporarily ceased publication in 1883 and published only sporadically until its closure in 1885. Following this incident Palm moved to Stockholm where he started another newspaper entitled Social-Demokraten.
