= Kvinnliga arbetarklubben =

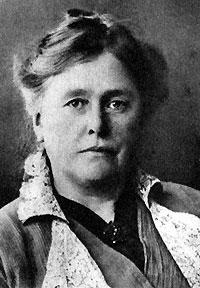
Elma Danielsson

Kvinnliga arbetarklubben or Malmö kvinnliga arbetareförbund (literary:'Women's Worker's Club' or 'Malmö Women's Worker's Association') was a pioneer worker's association for women in Malmö in Sweden, founded 17 October 1888 and dissolved in 1892. It was the first organisation for women in the Swedish labour movement. It was also one of the first organisations of the Swedish labour movements, founded one year prior to the Swedish Social Democratic Party.

== Foundation ==
The 1880s was a period of great activity and organisation of the new labour movement in Sweden, as well as the introduction of Socialism within it. While women came to be included in the labour movement, there where discrimination as well as a principal dislike within it to organise any sort of separate women's organisations, because according to the dominant belief within the movement, women's concerns were to be dealt with in parallel to men's, not separately, which could sometime result in women workers needs being neglected. The Kvinnliga arbetarklubben was founded by a group of politically engaged women within the labor movement. While women's organizations and even trade unions had existed before, this was the first socialist women's club and the first club exclusively for women within the labor movement, and thus played a pioneering role.

== Function ==
The stated purpose of the club was not, officially, to work with "women's issues", but to work to recruit more women to become involved within the labour movement and interested in becoming politically involved. In reality however they did become active within women's issues because that was issues that concerned women they recruited and was included within the labour movement. Their main activity was to improve the rights and conditions for women within the workforce by helping them to organise within working unions. They also debated other issues which affected gender equality and gender roles and held debates about current questions, such as one literary debate, in which a work by August Strindberg was judged to be influenced by misogyny. The chairperson was Elma Danielsson in 1888–90, and Maria Osberg-Wessel in 1890–92.

== Dissolution and aftermath ==
In 1892, the club was officially dissolved. The example of this pioneer club was followed all over the nation, and several similar local women worker's clubs was founded in Sweden, though they were all to be temporary until the foundation of the Stockholms allmänna kvinnoklubb, which was founded in 1892 with Kvinnliga arbetarklubben as its role model, and became the first women's club to be formally included in the Swedish Social Democratic Party.

In 1900, a new women workers club was founded in Malmö by the members of the former Kvinnliga arbetarklubben, called Malmö Kvinnliga Diskussionsklubb (literary: 'Malmö Women's Discussion Club') which could be seen as the re-founding of the old Kvinnliga arbetarklubben under a new name.
