= Atterdag Wermelin =

Swedish writer

Atterdag Wermelin (1861–1904) was a Swedish revolutionary socialist, writer and poet, a pioneer of the labor movement, who, together with August Palm, introduced Marxism to Sweden in the 1880s.

Wermelin came into dispute with Hjalmar Branting over the issue of political collaboration with the liberals, which the latter favored, and Branting made sure to politically isolate Wermelin. Conditions worsened for Wermelin since he was black-listed and could not find a job. He was eventually forced to emigrate to the United States in 1887 and settled in Chicago. He ended his life by committing suicide in the Chicago River.
