= Fredrik Sterky =

Swedish politician and trade union organizer

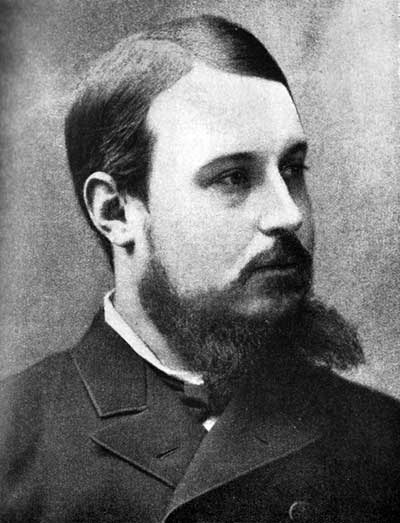
Fredrik Sterky

Fredrik Sterky (1860–1900) was an early Social Democrat and trade union organizer in Sweden. Fredrik Sterky co-founded and was chairman of the Swedish Trade Union Confederation from 1898 to 1900. He was also the founder and editor of Gothenburg-based news magazine Ny Tid.

He was the partner of the trade unionist Anna Sterky.
