= Amanda Horney =

Swedish politician (1857–1953)

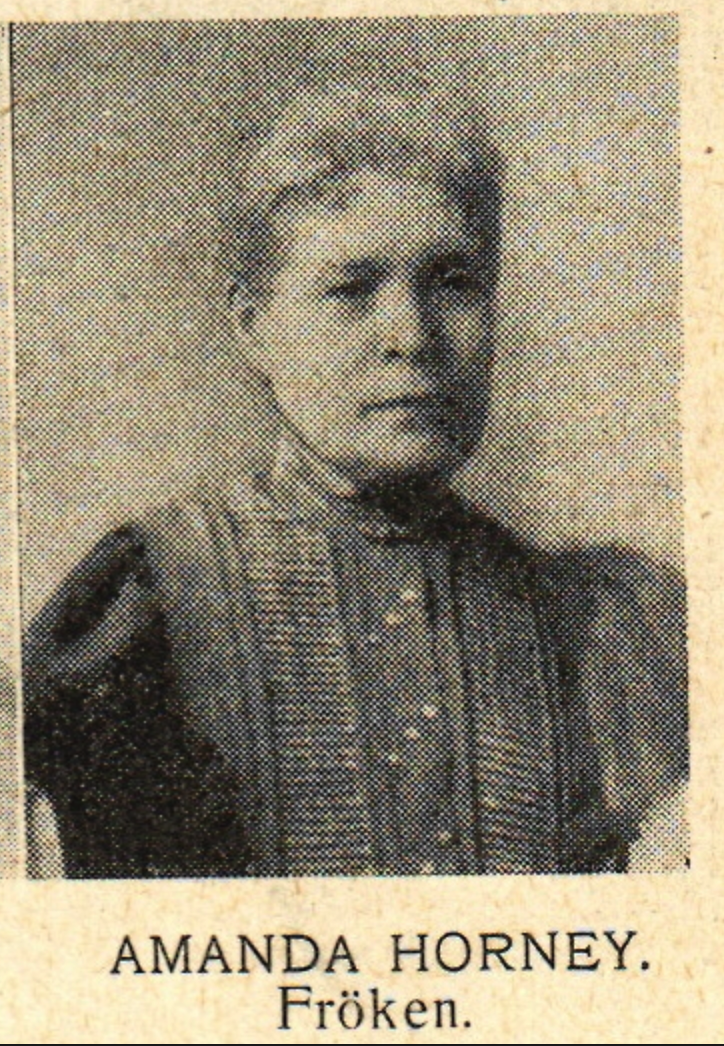
picture of Hulda Amanda Horney

Amanda Horney (1857–1953), was a Swedish politician (Social Democrat). She belonged to the pioneers of the labour movement, the Social Democratic movement, as well as the women's rights movement in Sweden.

She was co-founder and first chairman of Stockholms Allmänna Kvinnoklubb in 1892–1893, deputy chairman in 1919–1922, Board Member of the Kvinnokonferensen in 1907–1910, Board Member of the National Association for Women's Suffrage (Sweden), and Member of the Poor Help Board of the Klara Parish in Stockholm in 1920–1940.
