= Arbetet =

Social democrat newspaper in Sweden (1887–2000)

- Founder: Axel Danielsson
- Founded: 6 August 1887
- Ceased publication: 30 September 2000
- Political alignment: Social democrat
- Language: Swedish
- Headquarters: Malmö
- Country: Sweden
- ISSN: 1400-2345
- OCLC number: 477525534

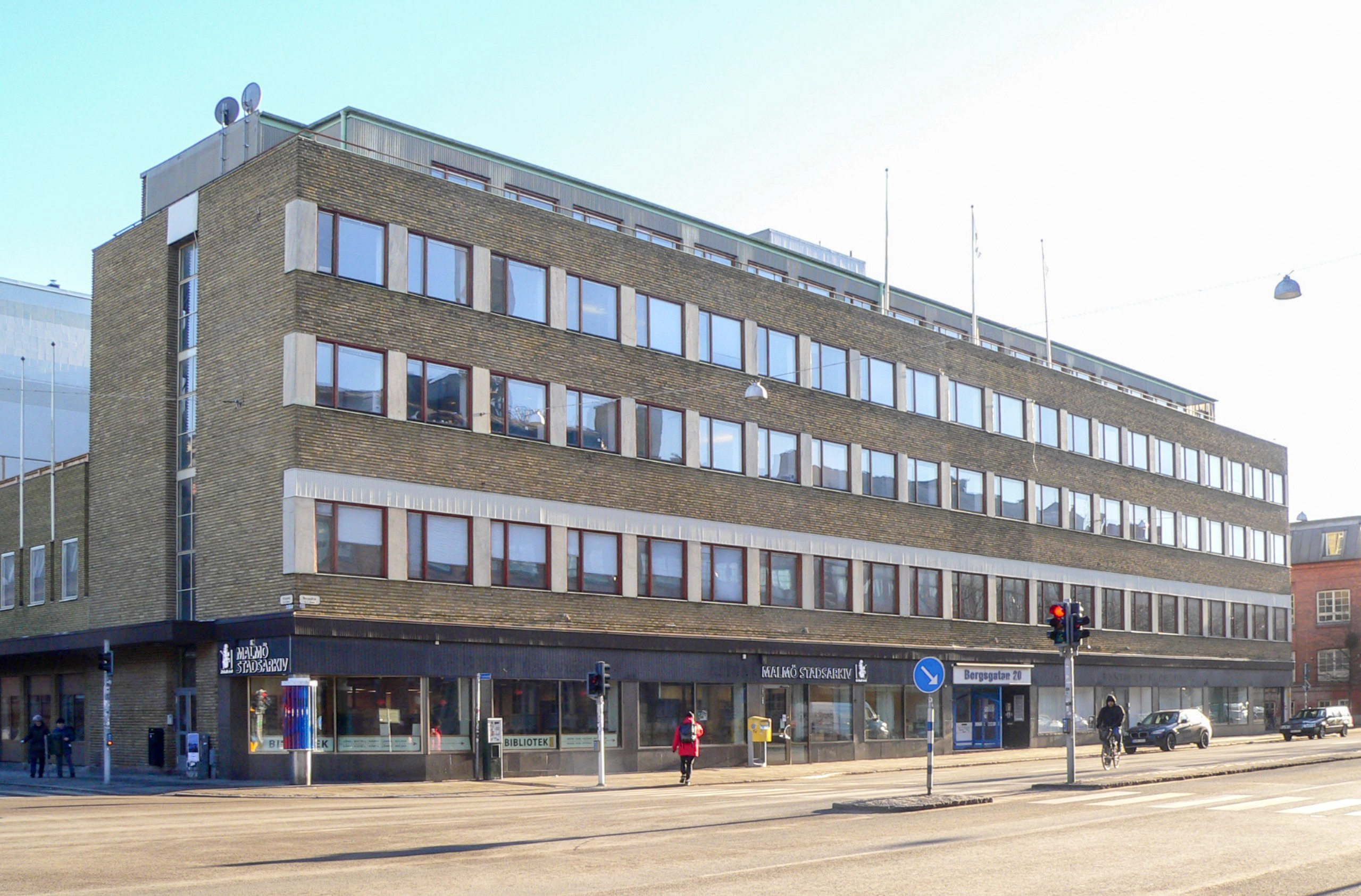
Arbetet building

Arbetet (Swedish: The Labour) was a Swedish-language social democrat newspaper published in Malmö, Sweden, from 1887 to 2000.

== History and profile ==
Arbetet was first published in Malmö on 6 August 1887. Axel Danielsson was the founder and served as the editor-in-chief of the paper between 1887 and 1889. The paper had a social democrat leaning and was officially affiliated with the Social Democratic Party.

The target audience of Arbetet was not only Malmö workers, but also economically middle-class. The paper described the food riots in Sweden in April 1917 as dignified and impressive. Bengt Lidforss was among the contributors of Arbetet who published articles about natural sciences, politics, philosophy and literature.

The paper awarded the Let Live Award (Swedish: Låt leva-priset). In 1981 the recipient of the award was Lech Wałęsa.

Arbetet ceased publication on 30 September 2000 soon after it went bankrupt in August 2000.

=== Editors-in-chief and staff ===
As mentioned above the founding editor-in-chief of Arbetet was Axel Danielsson between 1887 and 1889. In the 1910s Bengt Lidforss served as the editor-in-chief of the paper. Another editor-in-chief was Allan Vougt who was succeeded by Gösta Netzén in 1944. Netzén was in office until 1957. Frans Nilsson was named as its editor-in-chief in 1961. From 1980 to 1990 Lars Engqvist was its editor-in-chief.

Fredrik Sterky worked as the business manager of Arbetet.

=== Circulation ===
Arbetet was the best-selling newspaper in Malmö in the 1930s selling more copies than the other Malmö papers Skånska Dagbladet and Sydsvenska Dagbladet. However, its coverage of the Malmö households was less than 50% reducing its dominance in the region. In addition, Sydsvenska Dagbladet managed to sell more copies than Arbetet from the mid-1950s. When a social democratic news magazine entitled Ny Tid which was headquartered in Gothenburg folded in 1965, Arbetet acquired its circulation.

In the 1980s Arbetet enjoyed high levels of circulation and readership. In 1998 the paper sold 54,000 copies on weekdays and 58,000 copies on Sundays.
