= Swedish labour movement =

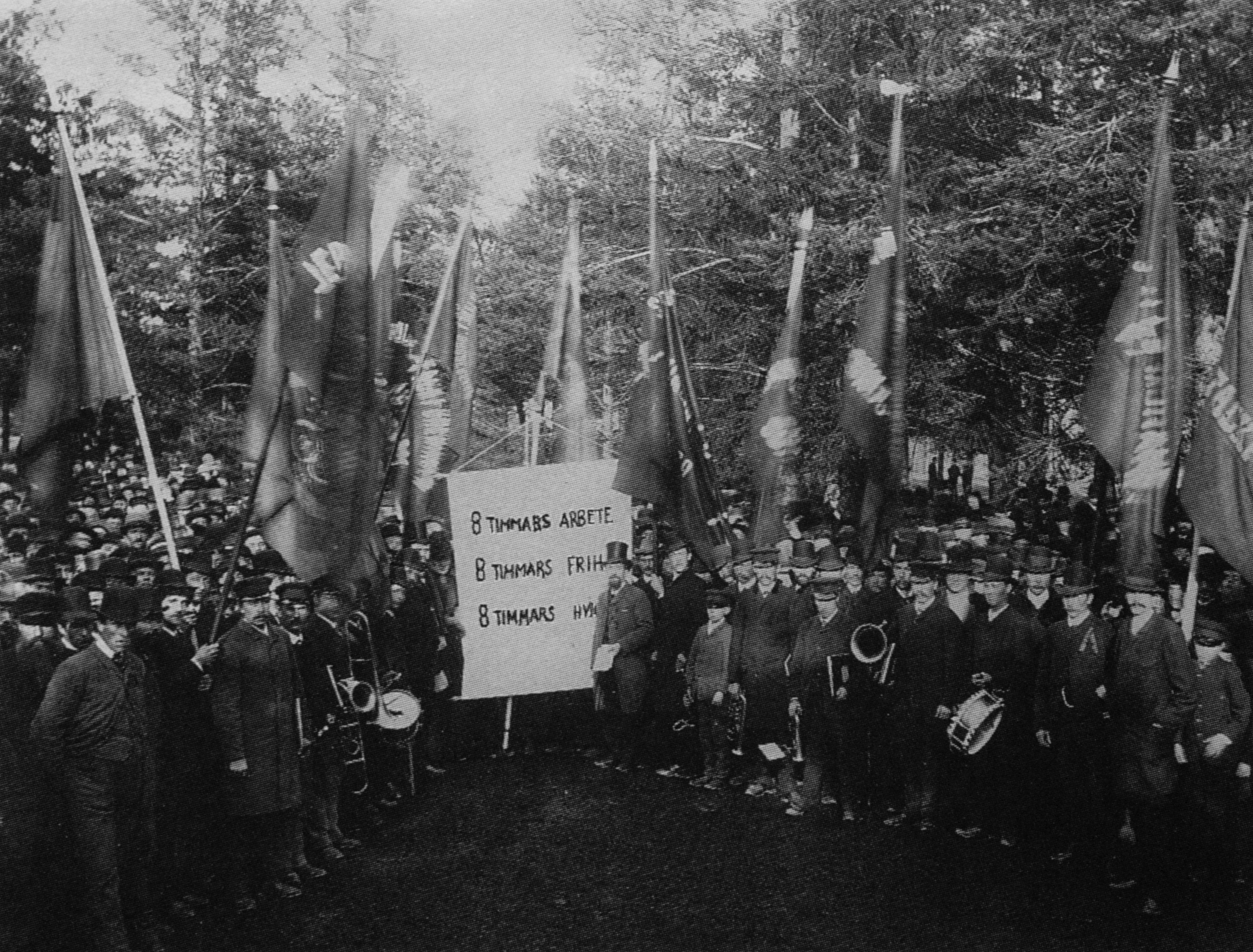
First of May 1890 in Sundsvall. The sign reads "8 hours of work, 8 hours of freedom, 8 hours of rest".

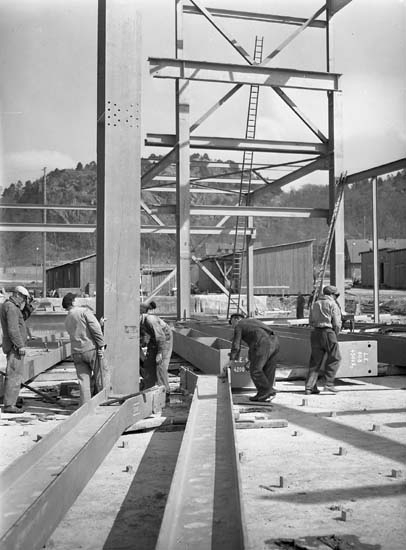
Steel workers in Sweden, circa 1950.

The labour movement in Sweden dates back to at least the 1850s, when Swedish workers initiated the organizing of previously spontaneous food riots into strikes, hence acting as an autonomous group.

== History ==
Modern types of labour unions emerged in the 1870s. An event that is usually considered to be central in the early days of the Swedish labour movement is the lecture "Hvad vil Social-Demokraterna?" ("What do the Social Democrats want?") by August Palm, at Hotel Stockholm in Malmö 6 November 1881. Five years later, in 1886, Sweden's first national labour union, Svenska Typografförbundet, was founded. Another union of that sort, Svenska Postmannaförbundet, was founded later that same year.

The labour movement soon divided into two parts, a political one and a union-specialized one. The union movement was organized in one central organization, the Swedish Trade Union Confederation (LO), founded in 1898, with the aim to organize all national labour unions in one central organization. Parallel to, but closely associated with this movement is the Swedish Social Democratic Party (SAP), founded in 1889.

These two organizations has ever since dominated not only the Swedish labour movement but also the political life in general. One example of their close association is the fact that all members of LO was initially automatically made members of SAP.

Even though LO has dominated labour relations in Sweden, the two other big confederations for unions, the Swedish Confederation of Professional Employees, TCO, and the Swedish Confederation of Professional Associations, SACO, are today almost as important participants as LO in the debate of labour economics. In 2008 for the first time the total number of active wage and salary members (i.e. excluding pensioner, students and self-employed) in TCO and SACO together surpassed that of LO. In the year before that (2007), the center-right government considerably raised the fees to unemployment funds, which in particular hit funds run by LO unions. The result was large membership losses of LO funds and LO unions and rapidly declining union density. The declining number of LO members is also related to the decreasing share of blue-collar workers in the labour force.
