= Kata Dalström =

Swedish socialist and writer (1858–1923)

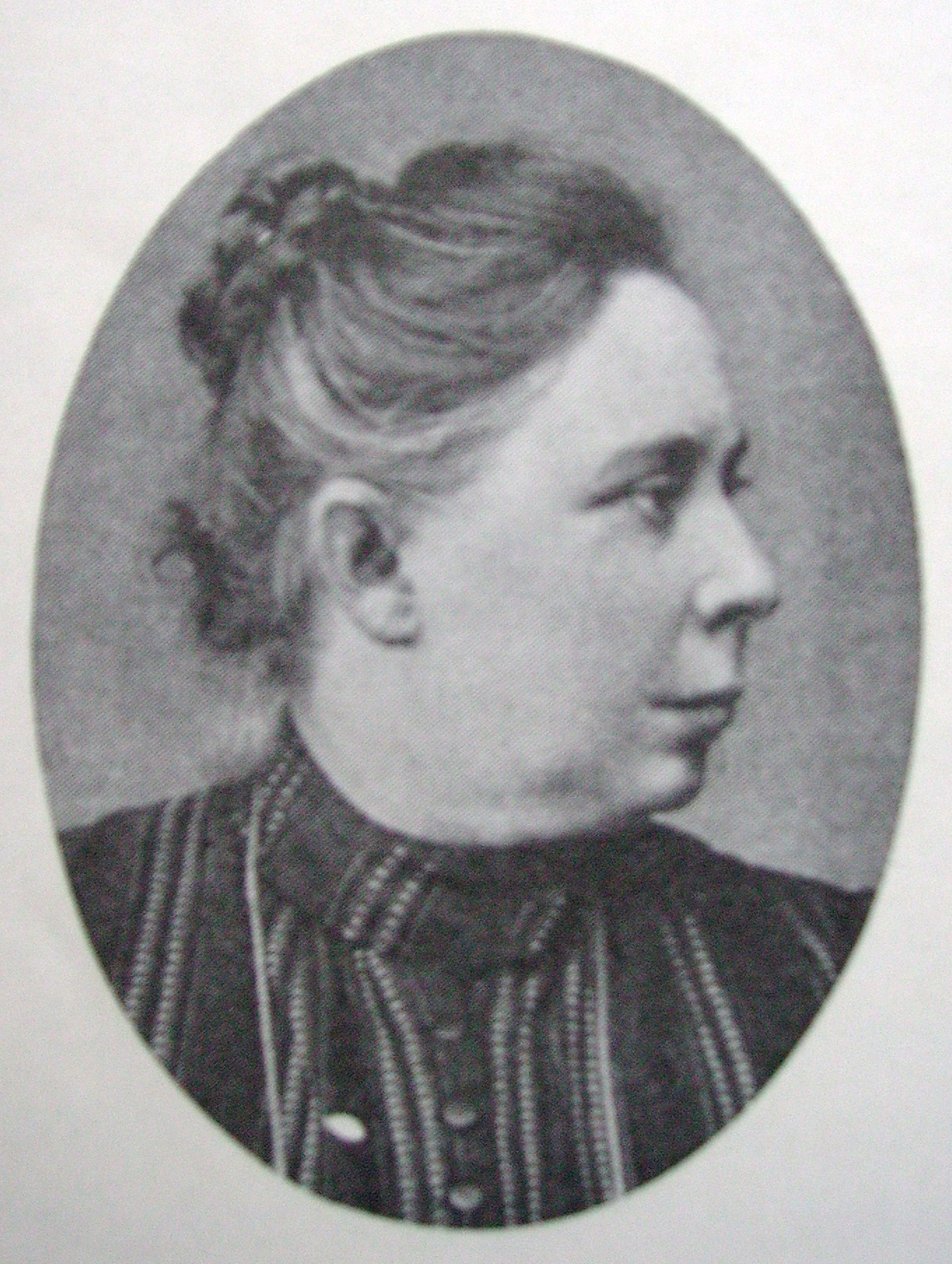
- Kata Dalström
- Born: Anna Maria Carlberg; 18 December 1858; Emtöholm, Västervik Municipality, Kalmar County, Sweden
- Died: 11 December 1923 (aged 64); Stockholm, Sweden
- Occupation: Socialist agitator

Anna Maria Katarina "Kata" Dalström, née Carlberg (18 December 1858 – 11 December 1923), was a Swedish socialist and writer. She belonged to the leading socialist agitators and leftist writers in contemporary Sweden, and has been referred to as "the mother of the Swedish socialist working class movement".

== Early life ==
Kata Dalström was born as Anna Maria in Emtöholm, Västervik Municipality, Kalmar County, into the wealthy family of professor Johan Oskar Carlberg and Maria Augusta Carlswärd. Her personality, considered unruly for a girl at the time, earned her the contemporary Swedish moniker kata, meaning 'intrepid'. She was educated at the girls' school of Emilie Risberg in Örebro from 1868 to 1872, and studied in preparation for a studentexamen. In 1878, she married civil engineer Gustav Mauritz Dalström (1837–1906). After her wedding she lived in Hultsfred from 1878 to 1884, Stockholm from 1884 to 1888, Visby from 1888 to 1890, Näsbyholm Castle from 1890 to 1894, and Stockholm from 1894 onward.

Dalström engaged in social work in the 1880s, when she focused on children and culture history. She was a board member of the Arbetsstugor för barn (Working Houses for Children) in 1886, and co-founder of the Katarina arbetsstuga (Katarina Work House) in 1887. In 1887, she also became a member of the Kvinnoklubben (Women's Club) for professional middle-class women. From 1889 to 1894, she was a lecturer for the temperance association Nykterhetsorden Verdandi, where she was elected board member in 1894.

== Social Democrat ==
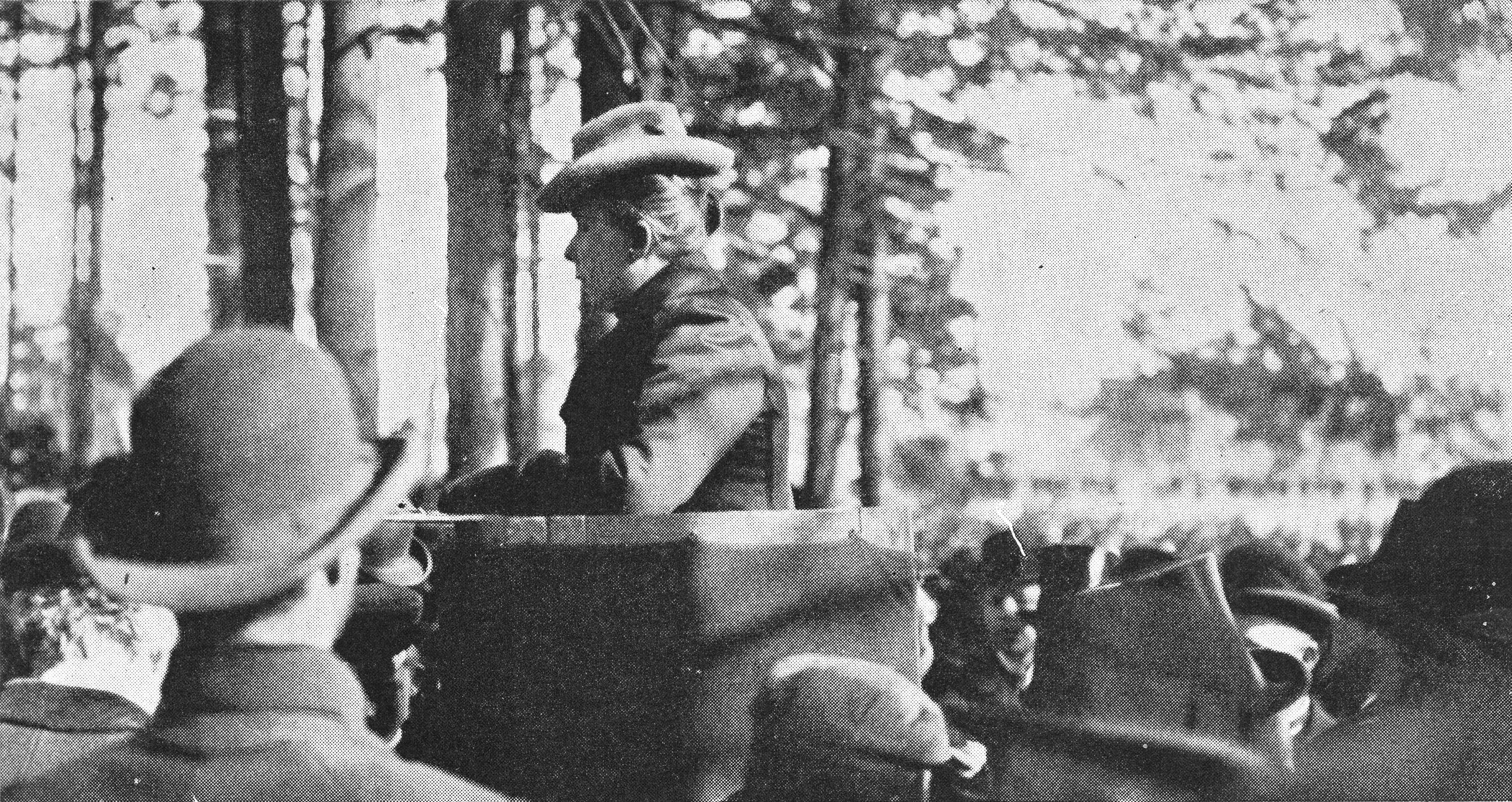
Kata Dahlström as lecturer

Opposed to authoritarian discipline and conservative views already as a child, she came to be a sympathizer of liberalism and then Marxism and socialism by her intellectual contacts, particularly Ellen Key, Knut Wicksell and Fridtjuv Berg. She studied socialism and contacted leading socialists such as Hjalmar Branting and Fredrik Sterky.

In 1893, Dalström joined the Swedish Social Democratic Party. The following year, she became a member of the Social Democratic Women's Club, Stockholms allmänna kvinnoklubb, and a travelling lecturer or "agitator" for the Swedish Social Democratic Party. As a lecturer, she participated frequently as a freelance writer in the Swedish socialist press, such as in Socialdemokraten, Stormklockan and Politiken. It is as a lecturer she became most famous, and she traveled as such all over the country, being the first of her sex in this position. She participated in the Social Democratic Party congress in Stockholm in 1897, Malmö in 1900, and Stockholm 1902.

In 1898, she became a member of the Social Democratic Party's executive committee in the district of Stockholm, and from 1900 to 1905, Dalström was the first woman to serve as a member of the executive committee of the Social Democratic Party, as well as any Swedish political party. She served as the Swedish delegate at the International Socialist Congress in Copenhagen in 1910.

As a lecturer, she was initially engaged in the organizing of working-class women, but expanded to include all the spheres of the working-class movement. She placed her main focus on trade union activity, organizing the workers of the textile industry, railroad, miners and others within the trade union, as she regarded strikes as an efficient method to achieve suffrage. She was engaged in Swedish trade union work from 1898, and a member of the committee organizing the great strikes of 1905, 1908 and 1911. With her powerful agitation, she reportedly had the ability to awake great enthusiasm: her fiery, aggressive and drastic speeches made her one of the most popular and efficient agitators of the Swedish working-class movement, and her ability to excite the masses and give them courage to keep fighting during conflicts with the authorities and in the midst of disappointments, especially during the great strikes of 1902 and 1909, has been described as an unusual one.

Dalström supported women's suffrage, but was never involved much in the issue because she regarded it as politically necessary to introduce full male suffrage before the issue of women's suffrage could be properly raised without damaging the transition to democracy. In 1905, she supported the dissolution of the union of Sweden-Norway.

== Communist ==
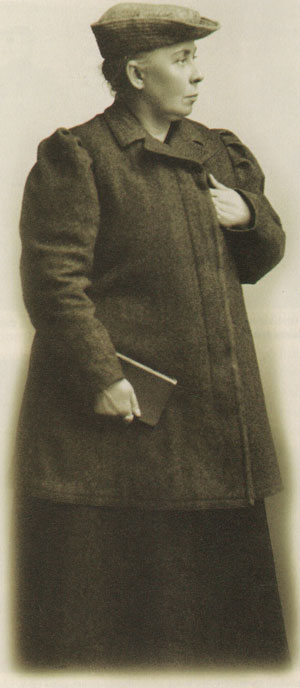
Kata Dalström

Always a member of the Social Democratic movement's radical left wing, Dalström supported Branting against Hinke Bergegren because she opposed anarchism, but after Bergegren and the anarchists were defeated, she became more and more radical. She continued to believe that the class struggle of Marx and Engels was the only true way for the working-class movement to achieve its goals, and she became disappointed in the pragmatist development of the Swedish Social Democratic Party.

During World War I, Dalström joined the Zimmerwald Left. She actively worked to found a new and more radical socialist party in Sweden, and in the party split of 1917 Dalström joined the Left wing, headed by Zeth Höglund, which would soon become the Communist Party, signifying a final break with the social democratic movement under Branting. She continued as a lecturer, now for the Communist party, using her ability and popularity to activate the mass movements during Sweden's final transition to democracy after the end of the war in 1917–1918.

Dalström was a supporter of the Bolsheviks and the Russian Revolution, supporting the hope of an international social revolution and joining the Communist International. She was the Swedish delegate to the second Comintern congress of 1920, where she was celebrated as one of the veterans of the international working-class movement. However, she detested the anti-democratic development of the communist regime in Russia and regarded it as a betrayal of the true ideal of socialism, and in 1922, she sided with Zeth Höglund in his reconciliation with the Social Democrats.

One reason why she abandoned communism at the end of her life, as well as one of the controversies Dalström was responsible for within the Swedish Communist group, was her view on religion. She wanted to see a more open approach towards Christianity, which according to her was entirely compatible with Socialism. This view was criticized, especially by the outspoken atheist Ture Nerman. Nerman was supported by Zinoviev, the leader of Communist International, who, although a supporter of religious freedom, declared that a communist politician had to be atheist to understand Marxism.

Dalström found an interest in theosophy later in life. She was a Tolstoyan and a Christian Communist who opposed the atheism of the communist party: she regarded Jesus Christ as social rebel and his true Christianity to have been corrupted by churches and priests, and when her opponents asked her: "Can a communist be a Christian?", she replied: "Can a Capitalist be a Christian?" Already in 1907, she had held a famous debate with the priest David Granqvist on Christianity and Socialism, and the same year, she copied Martin Luther by nailing her opinions upon the church door in Åmål. Her "original Christianity" had much in common with Buddhism, and at her death, she declared herself to be a Buddhist.

== Literary career ==
She also wrote books, mostly political texts, but also books about Norse mythology and Viking legends.

== In culture ==
Dalström appears as a character in Dag Skogheim's novel Sulis (1980).
