= August Palm =

Swedish politician (1849–1922)

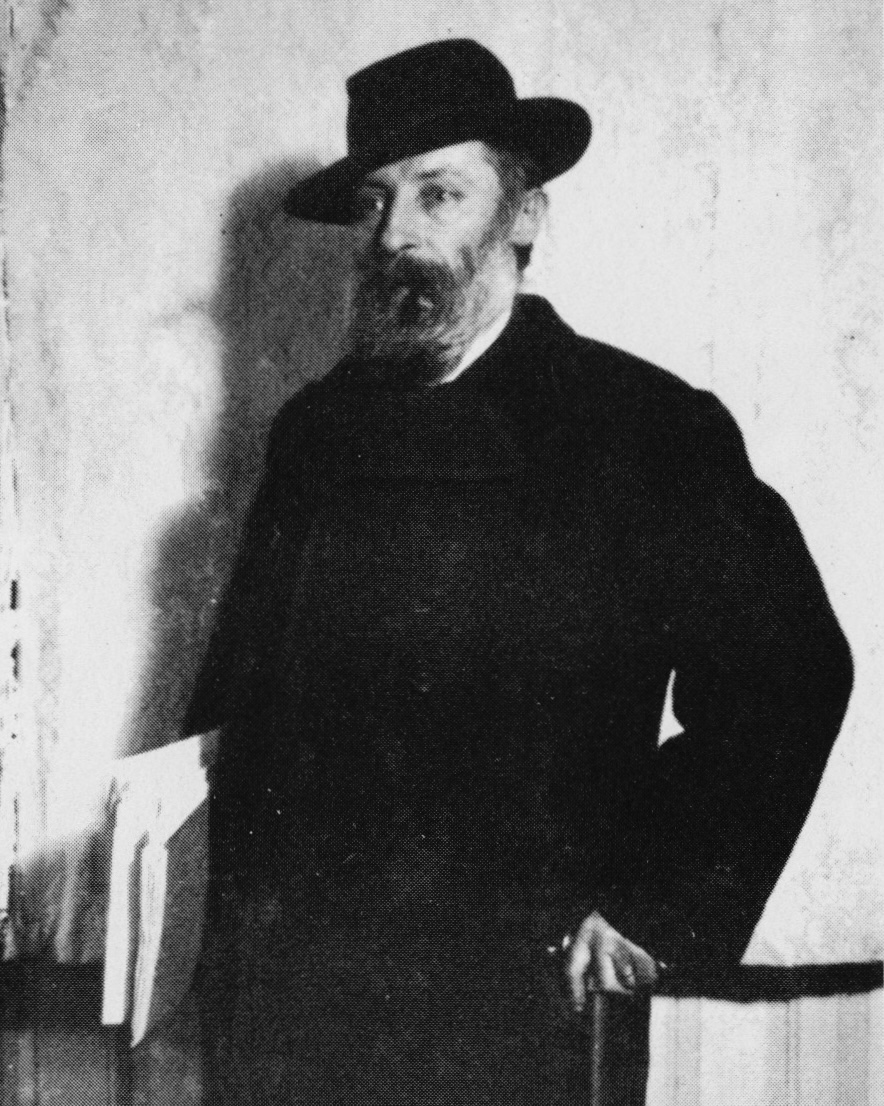
- Palm c. 1895
- Born: 5 February 1849; Färgaryd, Jönköping County, Sweden
- Died: 14 March 1922 (aged 73); Stockholm, Sweden
- Occupation: Tailor • activist • journalist •
- Known for: Early Social Democratic and labour movement leader

August Teodor Palm (5 February 1849 – 14 March 1922), also nicknamed Mäster Palm, was a Swedish political activist and agitator who played a major role in establishing the Social Democratic Party (SAP) in the 1880s. Originally trained as a tailor, he spent several years working in Germany and Denmark, where he was influenced by socialist and workers’ rights ideas that were spreading across Europe in the late 19th century.

== Life ==
=== Early activism ===
The son of a school teacher near Malmö, he was orphaned at the age of 10, after which he was trained to be a tailor. At the age of 18, he made an educational trip through Denmark and Germany, after which, in 1874, he settled as a tailor in Haderslev in Northern Schleswig. Also in 1874 he married Johanna Larsson.

During his travels in Germany, he learnt about socialist ideas, and in 1877 he was expelled from that country because of his socialist agitation. He then stayed in Storheddinge in Denmark until 1881, when he returned to his native Sweden. On 6 November of the same year, while in Malmö, Palm gave the first socialist speech ever in Sweden, and started on a political tour to Gothenburg and Stockholm.

=== Agitator ===
In March 1882, Palm started the newspaper Folkviljan (Will of the People) in Malmö, and acted as its editor until 1885, when it was discontinued. Palm moved to Stockholm and on 25 September 1885 began printing the newspaper Social-Demokraten (The Social Democrat), acting as its editor for its first year. From the fall of 1886, Hjalmar Branting took over as editor-in-chief. The government sent him to prison for three months in 1889 on account of statements made in the socialist press.

Palm's greatest contribution was as an agitator for trade union and socialist ideas, constantly touring around the country, often making speeches by the roadside - since he was barred from using lecture halls. Another of his messages, and perhaps the most important, was to expose the liberal middle-class discourse, with its claim to originate with "friends of the workers", as self-seeking and power-hungry careerism. Palm's constant argument was that working-class members were fully competent to look after their own interests.

=== Visit to the US ===
In 1900, August Palm was invited by the Scandinavian club of the Socialist Labor Party of America in Providence, Rhode Island, in co-operation with similar clubs in New York City and Brooklyn, to visit the United States, as a means to attract more members to these clubs. The trip started on 1 September 1900 and is described in the Swedish book Ögonblicksbilder från en tripp till Amerika (Snapshots from a Trip to America), published in 1901.

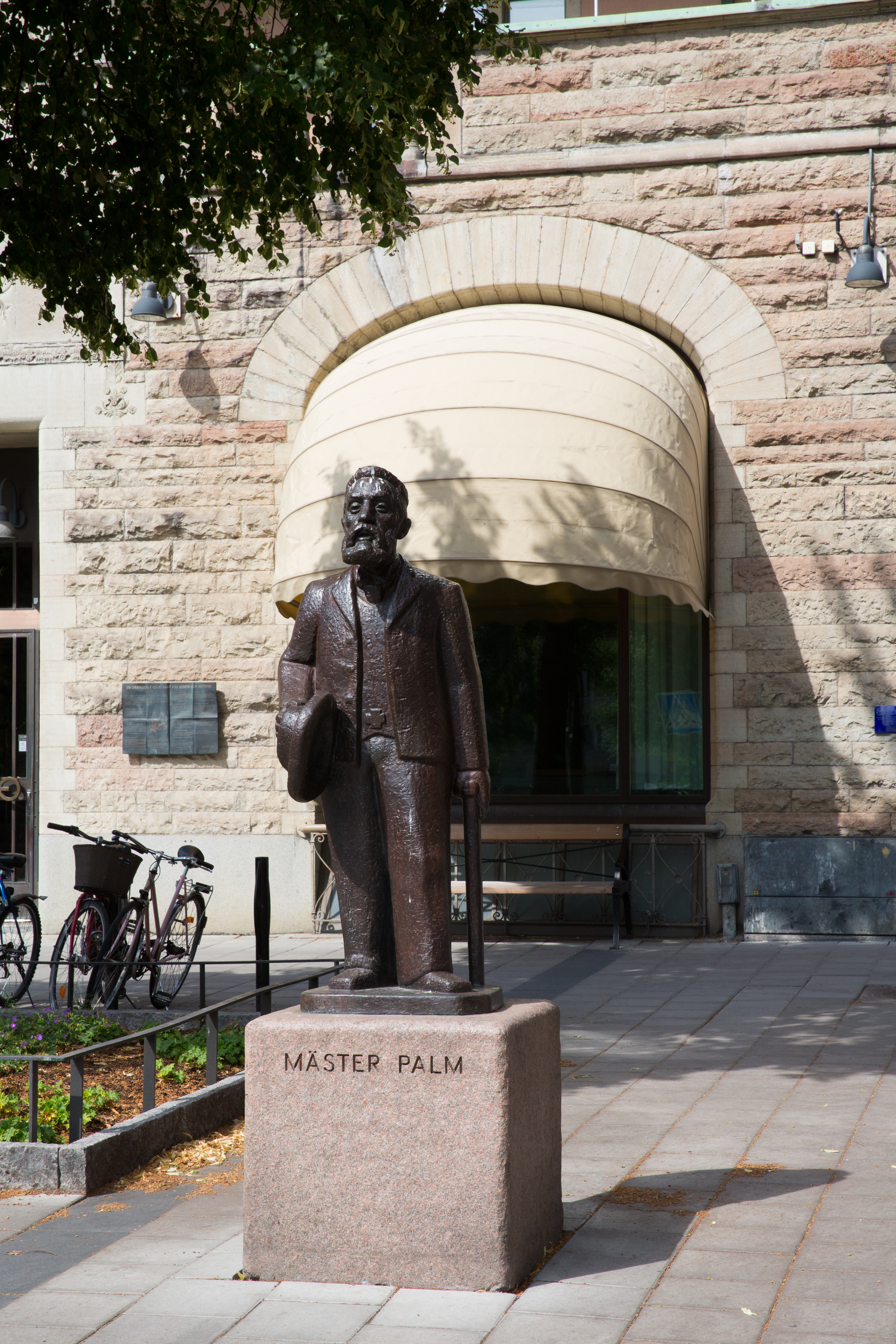
Statue of Mäster Palm at Norra Bantorget in Stockholm

== Books by August Palm ==
- Några drag ur mitt lif ("Some Excerpts from My Life"), 1899
- Ögonblicksbilder från en tripp till Amerika ("Snapshots from a Trip to America"), 1901
- Ur en agitators lif ("From the Life of an Agitator"), 1904

== See also ==
- Swedish Social Democratic Party
- Swedish labour movement
- Atterdag Wermelin
- The Branting Monument
- Torsten Billman August Palm is the central historical figure in buon fresco painting Development of Society (1947) in The People's House in Gävle.
