= Axel Danielsson =

Swedish politician (1863–1899)

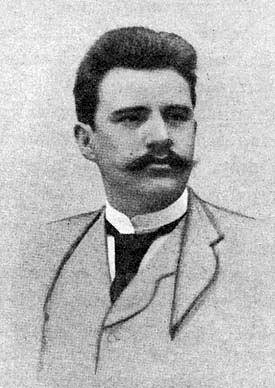
- Born: December 15, 1863; Värmland, Sweden
- Died: December 30, 1899 (aged 36); Elsterberg, Germany
- Occupations: Activist, journalist, writer
- Political party: Swedish Social Democratic Party
- Spouse: Elma Danielsson

Axel Danielsson (15 December 1863, Värmland – 30 December 1899, Elsterberg, Germany) was a Swedish socialist agitator, journalist and writer. He was a prominent leader of the early Swedish Social Democratic Party. Danielsson retranslated Karl Marx's The Communist Manifesto into Swedish in 1886.

Danielsson faced legal charges of blasphemy for a controversial article published in Hjalmar Branting's Social-Demokraten: the legal process culminated in the conviction of both men. Imprisoned in 1888, Danielsson celebrated the event by composing a pamphlet on the labour theory of value while serving out his sentence. During his imprisonment, his paper was managed by his then fiancée and later wife, Elma Danielsson.
