= Social-Demokraten =

Swedish daily newspaper (1885–1958)

Social-Demokraten (lit. 'the Social Democrat') was a Swedish daily Social Democratic newspaper, belonging to the Swedish Social Democratic Party. The paper was founded in 1885 by Axel Danielsson and August Palm. Palm also edited the paper from 1885 to 1886. Another editor-in-chief was Hjalmar Branting who held the post for two times: from 1886 to 1892 and from 1896 to 1908. It existed up to 1943 when it changed name to Morgon-Tidningen (lit. 'The Morning Paper'). The paper was based in Stockholm. Morgon-Tidningen existed up to 1958.
