= Anna Sterky =

Swedish politician, editor (1856–1939)

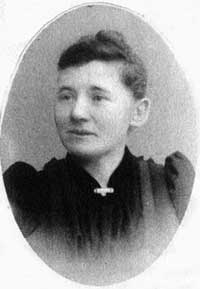
Anna Sterky

Ane Cathrine "Anna" Sterky née Nielsen (1856–1939) was a Danish-Swedish politician (Social Democrat), trade union organiser, feminist and editor, chiefly active in Sweden.

== Professional career ==
Sterky worked as a seamstress in Denmark, where she was active in the Danish trade union movement.

She was a pioneer in her work to build up trade unions for women, and she also worked for the creation of a social democratic women's group within the party. She was a member of the Swedish Social Democratic Party from 1900 to 1925, chairwoman of the Women's Trade Union (1902–1907), editor of the magazine Morgonbris of the Social Democratic Women in Sweden, together with Maria Sandel (1904–1909) and honorary chairwoman of the Social Democratic Women in Sweden (1920–1925).

== Personal life ==
In 1891, she moved to Sweden with the Swedish trade union organiser Fredrik Sterky, with whom she had a relationship; they never married, but she used his surname.
