= Maria Cederschiöld =

Swedish journalist and women's rights activist

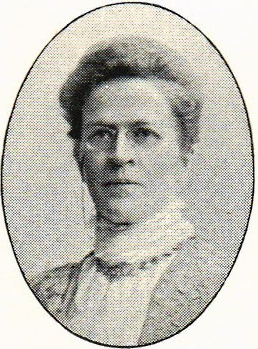
Maria Cederschiöld

Hedvig Maria Reddita Cederschiöld (29 June 1856, Stockholm – 19 October 1935, Stockholm) was a Swedish journalist and women's rights activist. She was the chief editor of the foreign office at Aftonbladet in 1909–1921, and the first woman in Sweden to hold such a position at a Swedish newspaper. She was also a secretary and vice chairperson of the Swedish branch of the International Council of Women.

== Life ==
Maria Cederschiöld was born to the official and noble Gustaf Cederschiöld (1812–1860) and Elsa Vilhelmina (Mimmy) Borg (1820–1889) and was the sister of the linguist Gustaf Cederschiöld. After the death of her father in 1860, the family lived under reduced circumstances in the home of her maternal grandmother. She studied at the Statens normalskola för flickor in 1864–1870 and the Wallinska flickskolan in 1872–74.

In 1874, she took her Studentexamen at the Gymnasium (school) in Stockholm. As there were yet no schools open to women which had the right to issue such a degree (that reform was introduced later that year), she and the four other female students studied at home and then attended the exam with the regular students at the gymnasium for boys. One of the three other girls were her lifelong friend, Ellen Fries.

Because of economic reasons, she was not able to follow her wish to study at the university after exam, as the family preferred to finance the studies of her brother. Therefore, she worked as a governess in 1874–1876, as a translator in 1876–1877 and as a teacher at Wallinska flickskolan in 1877–1884. Despite being described as a beauty who attracted a great deal of attention in the 1870s, she never married. In fact, at one point, she was reportedly in love with Knut Wicksell, but found him too radical. Maria Cederschiöld was described as an intelligent, gifted and with a strong will, but also as introvert and reserved.

On 4 November 1884, Maria Cederschiöld was employed at Aftonbladet. She was given the post partially through the influence of Anna Hierta-Retzius, a major stockholder at Aftonbladet and married to the editor at the time. She made translations, wrote foreign news articles and reviewed literature as a critic. In 1909, she succeeded Ernst Wallis as head of the foreign news department, and was given the responsibility for all foreign articles. She was the first woman journalist in Sweden in such a position and, thereby, a pioneer. In 1911, she became a member of the Swedish Publicists' Association.

In 1918, she described her first period in the journalism profession and commented that it had in fact been much less controversial for a woman to be a journalist in the 1880s, when women's emancipation was still a welcomed novelty and not such a provocation as it was to be later:

"...when the results of Strindberg's hatred of women made itself known. Nor was the struggle of life and competition so sharp, as it has later become. The women pioneers were generally treated with sympathy and interest, even by the men, perhaps because they normally did not regard them as dangerous competitors."

Maria Cederschiöld was also active as a women's rights activist both nationally and internationally. Between 1884 and 1900, she was the secretary of the Svenska Kvinnors Nationalförbund, the Swedish branch of the International Council of Women, and its vice chairperson from 1909 to 1919, and participated as the Swedish delegate in its congresses in London 1899, Paris (with Hilda Sachs) in 1900, Berlin 1904, and its board meetings in Dresden 1904 and Berlin 1912. In 1902, she wrote the appeal accompanying 4154 signatures in favor of women's suffrage sent to the parliament by the Fredrika Bremer Association before the creation of the National Association for Women's Suffrage. Cederschiöld was a member of the women's association Nya Idun. In 1892–1895, she was the secretary of the Married Woman's Property Rights Association. She was also engaged in a number of other civil organisations for women's rights, welfare and literature.

== Works ==
- Lars Johan Hierta och kvinnas rätt i samhället (Lars Johan Hierta and the rights of women in society) 1901
- Den svenska gifta kvinnans rättsliga ställning (The legal position of the married Swedish woman) 1903
- En banbryterska. En minnesskrift över Ellen Fries (A pioneer. A memorial over Ellen Fries) 1913

== See also ==
- Wendela Hebbe
