= Fredrika Limnell =

Swedish salonist

Catharina Fredrika Limnell née Forssberg (14 July 1816 – 12 September 1897), was a Swedish philanthropist, mecenate, feminist and salonist.

== Private life ==
Fredrika Forssberg was born on July 14, 1816 in Härnösand Municipality in Västernorrland County Sweden, as the daughter of lektor Olof Fredrik Forssberg and Catharina Margareta Svedbom. She had two siblings, but the elder sister died in first year of life and her younger sister drowned when she was 13.

Fredrika Limnell was raised in a literary home and had the ability to cultivate her interests in literature and music. Prior to her first marriage, she was engaged to the poet Anders Grafström, but the engagement was terminated on her initiative.

In 1842 in Stockholm, she married her cousin, Per Erik Svedbom (1811–1857), headmaster at Nya Elementar in Stockholm and editor of Aftonbladet with whom she had two sons, William (1843) and Erik (1855). After the death of her first husband, she was married in 1858 to Carl Abraham Limnell (1823–1882), a lieutenant in the Civil Engineering Corps and later office manager at the Swedish Royal Railway Board.

Together with Carl Limnell, she built Villa Lyran, an exclusive summer villa in the district Bredäng, a suburb in south-west Stockholm. The couple also maintained a winter residence at Gustav Horns palats at Fredsgatan 2 in Stockholm, today the site of the Medelhavsmuseet.

== Cultural activity ==
Already during her first marriage, she moved to the capital of Stockholm, where she became the center of a literary salon. She was a benefactor of artists: she partially financed Fredrika Bremer's trip to Palestine, and supported Selma Lagerlöf economically so she could concentrate on her writing. She held a salon for the artist elite, and gathered artists as guests at Villa Lyran, her country villa on Lake Mälaren from May–September, where Jenny Lind, Gunnar Wennerberg, Victoria Benedictsson, Carl Snoilsky, Carl David af Wirsén, Emil Sjögren, Christina Nilsson and Henrik Ibsen were among the guests. King Oscar II of Sweden also visited it. The so-called Limnellska salongen (The Limnell Salon) was particularly popular during the 1870s and 1880s, and known as a hospitable center of the Swedish cultural elite. Among her guests were Bjørnstjerne Bjørnson, W F Dalman, Ivar Hallström, L J Hierta, Elise Hwasser, Henrik Ibsen, Carl Snoilsky, Sophie Adlersparre, Amanda Kerfstedt and Anna Hierta-Retzius. Her son, the composer Vilhelm Svedbom (1843–1904), arranged soirees at her salon, which were also attended by her daughter-in-law, pianist Hilma Svedbom, and Pontus Wikner held lectures in philosophy. She also arranged for new authors to read their work in her salon, or have actors to read their works for them in her salon. She herself read aloud poems from Werner von Heidenstam before he became known, and Selma Lagerlöf read excerpts form her novel Gösta Berlings saga in her salon before it was printed and published.

== Social work ==
The family business, Wifstavarfs AB, Svedbom-Hellzen provided good yields, and enabled Limnell to generously help the women's movement as well as several other social projects, engage in social work, charity and act as the patron of artists. She was interested in the improvement of the political, economical and juridical position of women already in the 1850s, and many women's organizations held their meetings in her salon. In 1853, she co-founded the Stockholms fruntimmersförening för barnavård (Stockholm women's fund for child care) with Fredrika Bremer. Through her position as a member of the board of directors of several charity organisations, she initiated the foundations of several scholarships for female students.

Limnell was a central figure in the Stockholm high society and involved in various organisations within charity, feminism and social issues. Through her activity she played an important role in contemporary Swedish cultural life and social development. Limnell was the secretary of the Stockholms fruntimmersförening för barnavård (Stockholm women's fund for child care) in 1853; a member of the board of directors of the Föreningen för gift kvinnas äganderätt (The Married Woman's Property Rights' Association) in 1873; a member of the board of directors of the Fredrika Bremer Association in 1884; a member of the board of directors of the Klara skydds- och arbetarförening (The Klara Congregation's Protection and Worker's Association); a member of the board of directors of the Aftonkursen för fruntimmer of Jenny Rosander (The Women's Evening Courses) in 1865; and a member of the board of directors of the hospital Eugeniahemmet.

With her good connections, she was a help to many activists within these fields. She participated in the social projects of Fredrika Bremer and Princess Eugenie of Sweden, in the ladies' committee in the foundation of the Swedish Red Cross (Svenska Röda Korset) (1864–1865) and during 1884 in the foundation in the pioneer Swedish feminist organisation Fredrika Bremer Association together with Sophie Adlersparre, Ellen Anckarsvärd, Ellen Fries, Hans Hildebrand and Gustaf Sjöberg. She financed the pioneer feminist magazine Tidskrift för Hemmet (1859) published by Rosalie Roos and Sophie Adlersparre. She was the vice chairman of Eugeniahemmet (1874–1892), a hospital for sick children founded by Princess Eugenie of Sweden which was named after her.

She died on 12 September 1897 in Stockholm.

== See also ==
- Malla Silfverstolpe
