= Bertha Nordenson =

Swedish suffragist

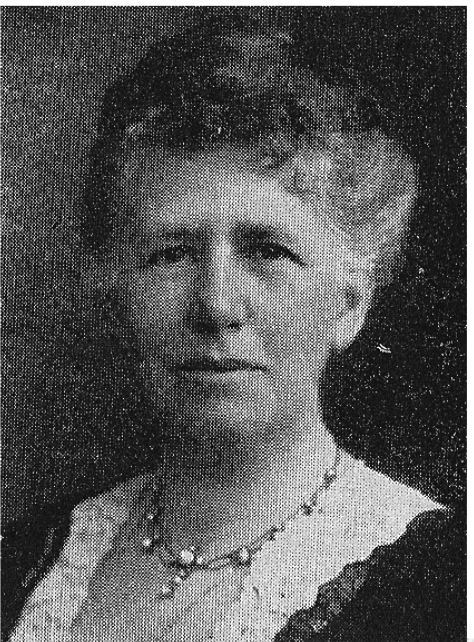
Bertha Nordenson

Bertha Harriet Nordenson (1857–1928) was a devoted Swedish women's rights activist and suffragist. From the late 1880s, she supported women's emancipation, becoming a member and later a board member of the Married Woman's Property Rights Association (Föreningen för gift kvinnas äganderätt). When it was incorporated into the Fredrika Bremer Association (Fredrika Bremer Förbundet), Nordenson joined the standing committee on the legal position of women and was later elected to the board. As a result, she also became a significant contributor to the National Council of Swedish Women (Svenska kvinnors nationalförbund). Taking an active interest in medical care, from 1908 she chaired Föreningen för sjukvård i fattiga hem (Society for Home Medical Care for the Poor). For her extensive services to the Swedish Red Cross, she was awarded the gold medal.

== Early life ==
Born in London on 25 September 1857, Bertha Harriet Nordenson was one of the five daughters of the timber and iron industrialist Johan Gustaf Carl Pontus Kleman (1817–1903) and his wife Bertha Amalia née Hierta (1836–1926). In 1882, she married the eminent ophthalmologist Erik Wilhelm Nordenson (1847–1919), with whom she had five children. Brought up by a prosperous family in London, Paris and the south of France, she received a good education, developing fluency in English, French and German. She frequently spent her holidays in Sweden with her maternal grandparents, the newspaper publisher Lars Johan Hierta and his wife Wilhelmina, who contributed to her proficiency in Swedish.

== Career ==
After living in Paris after their marriage, the couple returned to Sweden when Bertha was 30, settling in Stockholm. In addition to raising a family, she became increasingly involved in the fight for women's emancipation together with several of her female relatives. In particular, she became an active member of the Married Woman's Property Rights Association which had been established by her aunt, the women's rights reformer Anna Hierta-Retzius. When it merged with the Fredrika Bremer Association, Nordenson served on the committee on the legal position of women, later becoming a board member. In that capacity, she was one of the signatories of the petition of women's suffrage delivered to the king in 1899.

Together with her cousin Ellen Kleman, she was also an active member of the National Association for Women's Suffrage. In that capacity, in 1911 she helped to organize the Sixth Conference of the International Woman Suffrage Alliance which was held in Stockholm. She was also a significant contributor to the National Council of Swedish Women which she chaired from 1921 until 1927 when she resigned suffering from poor health. Taking an active interest in medical care, from 1908 she chaired Föreningen för sjukvård i fattiga hem (Society for Home Medical Care for the Poor). For her extensive services to the Swedish Red Cross, she was awarded the association's gold medal.

Bertha Nordenson died in Stockholm on 24 January 1928.
