= Anna Hierta-Retzius =

Swedish women's rights activist and philanthropist

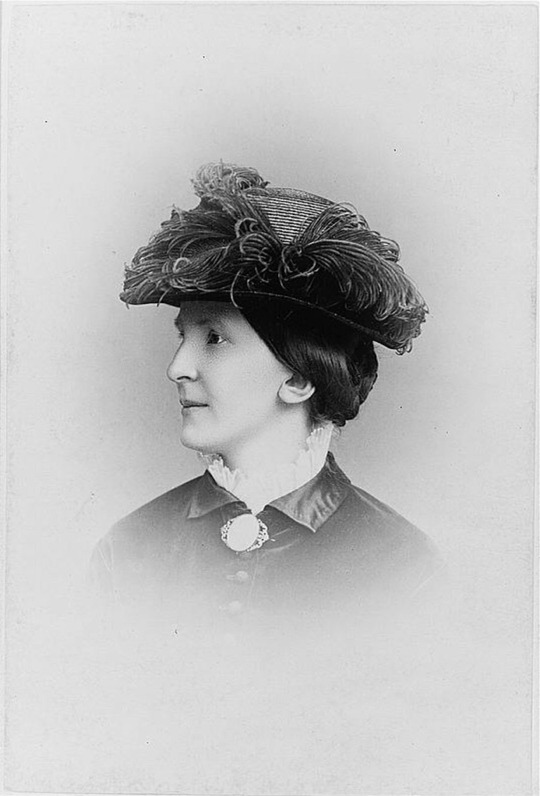
- Anna Hierta-Retzius. Photography by Selma Jacobsson.
- Born: 24 August 1841; Storkyrkoförsamlingen
- Died: 21 December 1924 (aged 83); Adolf Fredriks parish
- Resting place: Solna cemetery
- Occupation: Philanthropist, women's rights woman
- Parent(s): Lars Johan Hierta

Anna Wilhelmina Hierta-Retzius, née Hierta (24 August 1841 – 21 December 1924), was a Swedish women's rights activist and philanthropist. She was the co-founder and secretary of the Married Woman's Property Rights Association (1873), founder and chairperson of the evening school Torsdagsskolan in 1864–1874, member of the board in the Bikupan association in 1870–1887, Vice Chairperson of the Married Woman's Property Rights Association in 1886–1893, member of the board of the Stiftelsen Lars Hiertas Minne (The Memorial Foundation of Lars Hierta) in 1878-1911 and its Vice Chairperson in 1911–1924, co-worker in Aftonbladet in 1884–1887, founder of the Adolf Fredriks arbetsstuga för barn (Adolf Fredrik Work House for Children) in 1887, Chairperson of the central committee of the Stockholm work houses in 1889–1909, chairperson of the Swedish National Council of Women (SKNF) in 1899–1911, Vice Chairperson of the International Council of Women (ICW) in 1904–1909.

== Early life ==
Anna Hierta-Retzius was the daughter of Lars Johan Hierta, the founder of Aftonbladet, and Wilhelmina Fröding (1805-1878). On 28 November 1876, she married scientist and professor Gustaf Retzius, with whom she was active in social and scientific projects. She had no children.

She was raised in an intellectual environment, her father being the manager of a progressive newspaper, and artists, writers and politicians being common guests in her home. Reportedly, she was influenced both by the philanthropic interests of her mother and the radical ideas of gender equality of her father, and developed an interest in social reform and active work to achieve this goal, and she wished to live up to her father's expectations of a son.

She was educated at the Lärokursen för fruntimmer (Learning Courses for Women) in 1859–1861, which was held in Stockholm as a response of the debate of education for women which had been caused by Hertha (novel) by Fredrika Bremer and was the prequel of the Högre lärarinneseminariet. As such, she belonged to the first females in Sweden to be given a serious public education in nature science. Soon after this, she engaged in social reform work, influenced by her view of Christian social liberalism.

== Educational reformer ==
Having finished her education, she was active as a teacher in the Sunday school opened by Sophie Adlersparre from 1862. In 1864, she opened her own evening school for female students from the working class, Torsdagsskolan, where she offered tutoring in reading, writing, nature science, history, geography and needle work. She also organized library and a bank for women. Together with Sophie Adlersparre and Fredrika Limnell, she was a co-founder of the Stockholms läsesalong (Stockholm Reading Parlor) for women, founded after a British example.

In 1869, she visited Paris to study the women's college of Jules Simon, and in 1870, she founded the Bikupan, to offer a place were women could sell their handicrafts: Bikupan participated at the Weltausstellung 1873 Wien. She was engaged in the question of women's education. During the 1860s, she organized several public meetings for debate about reform in women's education, and in the early 1870s, she arranged two competitions which attracted a great deal of debate and attention around the subjects: the causes of women's general bad health, and the upbringing and education of females.

She disliked girl schools and was a supporter of co-education, and she supported Karl Edvard Palmgren and his co-educational Praktiska arbetsskolan (Practical Work's School), where she introduced the subject of gymnastic and cooking in an effort to improve the health of the students.

Anna Hierta-Retzius engaged in health reform, wishing to introduce gymnastics to the educational system for girls. She proposed this to Högre lärarinneseminariet in the 1860s, and in 1880, she founded the Stockholm Museum of Gymnastics, which she donated to the city in 1892.

== Women's rights reformer ==
In 1873, women were given the right to study at university, and Anna Hierta-Retzius and her sister Hedvig founded a scholarship fund for women students. The same year, she and Ellen Anckarsvärd took the initiative to establish the Married Woman's Property Rights Association, which was the first women's rights organization in Sweden. She initiated it inspired by her father, who had petitioned the parliament several times in the issue of the property rights and legal status of married women, and after his death in 1872, she wished to continue his work. The association was successful: though the guardianship of the married woman was not abolished, she was given the right to control her own income the year after. In 1884, the first motion about woman suffrage was raised in parliament, but was voted down. By the law of 1862, taxpaying women of legal majority already had the right to vote in municipal elections, and in 1887, Hierta-Retzius and the Married Woman's Property Rights Association issued a campaign directed toward women voters to make them aware of their right and to use it. The next issue she devoted the association to, was to campaign for women's right to be elected to school boards and social boards. In FBF, the association was merged with the Fredrika Bremer-förbundet. Hierta-Retzius opposed the merge, but once it was made, she did support the FBF.

She was also active within the Swedish Dress Reform Society.

As a major shareholder in Aftonbladet, she is credited with having employed Maria Cederschiöld, an important pioneer for women journalists.

During her tenure as chairperson of the Swedish Women's National Council (SKNF) in 1899–1911, she visited international congresses in London 1899, Berlin 1904 and Geneva 1908. In this position, she initiated a debate which led to a reform in Swedish police force, when the first female police officers were employed in 1908.

== Philanthropic work ==
At her mother's death in 1878, she became the trustee of the fortune of her father and mother, which was donated to be used for philanthropic purposes. She founded the charity fund Stiftelsen Lars Hiertas Minne, which she used to support numerous philanthropic issues, scientific discoveries, culture and social reform. Through this, she founded the first working cottage in 1887: this was an activity inspired by Denmark were poor children made handicraft in exchange for food. This project grew to about 90 in the entire nation, and to Russia and Poland. The purpose was to give children to working parents useful past time rather than to be left alone during the day while their parents worked. In connection to them, the teacher Sofi Nilsson co-founded with her an education of Family and consumer science for girls by letting them cook for the cottages (1889). In 1889, she introduced the Octavia Hill system for healthy residences for working people.

== Later life ==
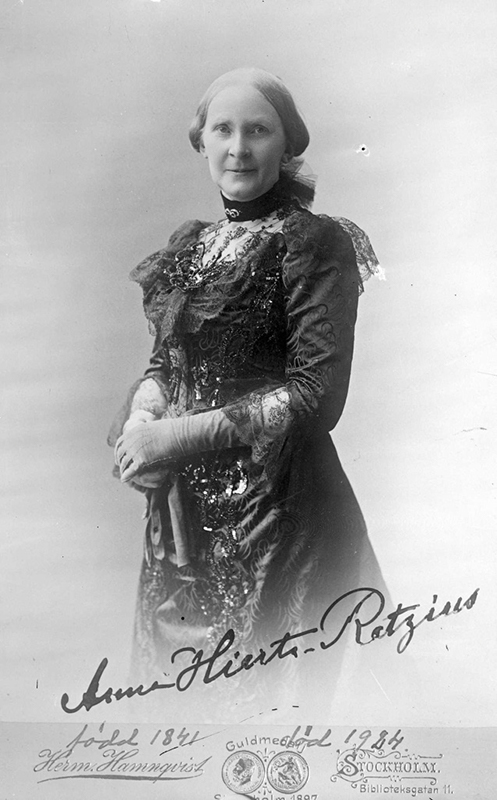
A later portrait of Anna Hierta-Retzius (taken sometime after 1887)

The work of Anna Hierta-Retzius entered a new phase in the 1880s. During the sexual debate of the 1880s, were new ideas of free love became fashionable, Anna Hierta-Retzius positioned herself on the conservative side. In this, she was an opponent to Ellen Key.

Around this time became more conservative in sexual issues: she pressed for sexual censorship within literature and the cinema and a ban against birth control and sexual tuition, and required a reputation of being a moralist prude and a defender of conservative ideas, which was in many ways a change in regard to her previous radicalism.

The reason for this attitude are suggested to have been caused by the discovery of her father's double life: the fact that her father had a permanent extramarital relationship with his lover, Vendela Hebbe, and had thus betrayed her mother, had been hidden from her during the life of her parents, and the discovery of her father's adultery after the death of her mother in 1878 was reportedly traumatic for her, and caused a crisis that eventually resulted in more and more strict views over the years.

During the 1900s, she became known as a critique of the new modern radical literature. In 1912, she further more opposed woman suffrage.

Hierta-Retzius was given Illis Quorum in 1907.
