= Nettelbladt =

Nettelbladt is a surname. Notable people with the surname include:

- Daniel Nettelbladt (1719–1791), German jurist and philosopher
- Jessica Nettelbladt (born 1972), Swedish director and filmmaker
- Lovisa Mathilda Nettelbladt (1814–1867), Swedish novelist and travel writer
