= Hilma Svedbom =

Swedish pianist (1856–1921)

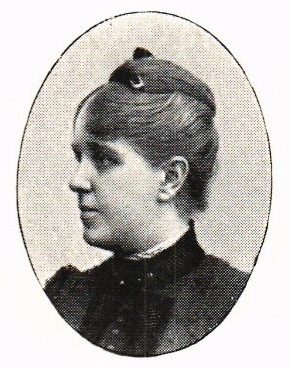
- Born: Hilma Hildegard Josefina Lindberg; 28 September 1856; Stockholm, Sweden
- Died: 12 March 1921 (aged 64); Stockholm, Sweden
- Resting place: Norra begravningsplatsen, Stockholm, Sweden
- Occupation: Pianist
- Spouse: Vilhelm Svedbom (m. 1884)

Hilma Hildegard Josefina Svedbom (née Lindberg; 28 September 1856 – 12 March 1921) was a Swedish pianist.

Svedbom was born in 1856 in Stockholm, Sweden, to Gustaf Lindberg and Catharina Fernqvist. Her early musical education was taught by Oscar de Wahl. Later, she became a student at the Stockholm Conservatory in 1874. Prominent pianist Hilda Thegerström was her instructor there. In 1881, she founded Damtrion ('the Women's Trio') along with Walborg Lagerwall and Hilma Åberg. She was a member of the trio until 1883, touring Sweden, Denmark, and Norway in 1882.

She married Vilhelm Svedbom, a composer, in 1884. Her mother-in-law, Fredrika Limnell, was known for holding salons. They were attended by a number of known figures in the humanities, including early feminists such as writer Fredrika Bremer. Svedbom herself was also involved in women's issues. In 1885, she was one of the first fifteen committee members of the women's association Nya Idun, joining other women such as Calla Curman, Ellen Key, and Ellen Fries.

In the early 1890s, she collaborated with Tor Aulin and Franz Neruda as well as playing accompaniment for singers Teresa Carreño, Dina Edling, and Julia Ohlsson. In 1897 she was elected to the Royal Swedish Academy of Music. Svedbom was known as a philanthropist; she donated money to causes such as schools and the Stockholm Concert Society, as well as starting a scholarship fund.

Svedbom died 12 March 1921 in Stockholm and is buried in Norra begravningsplatsen.
