= Bror Emil Hildebrand =

Swedish archaeologist, numismatist and museum director

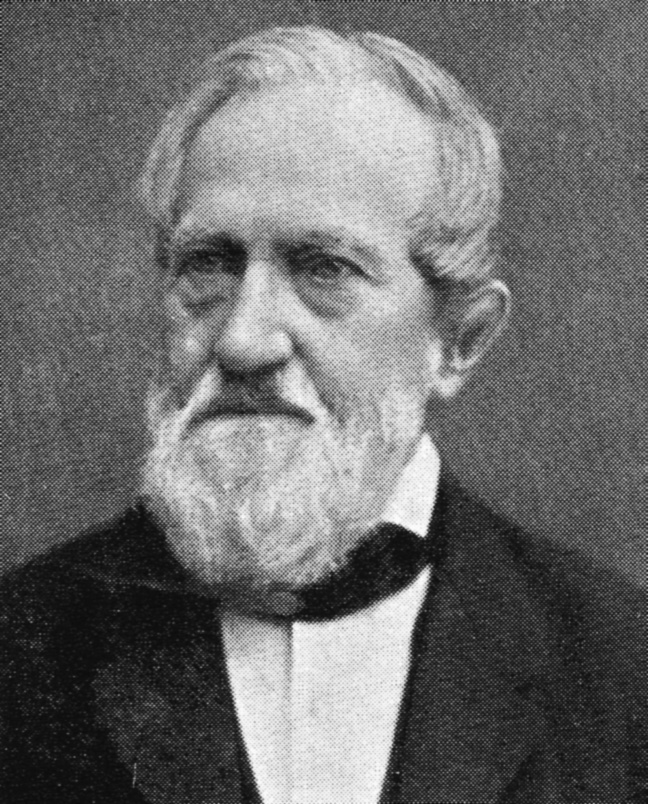
- Born: 22 February 1806; Nybro, Sweden
- Died: 30 August 1884 (aged 78); Stockholm, Sweden
- Occupations: archaeologist, numismatist and museum director
- Children: Hans Hildebrand

Member of the Swedish Academy (Seat No. 11)
- In office 20 December 1866 – 30 August 1884
- Preceded by: Lars Magnus Enberg
- Succeeded by: Clas Theodor Odhner

Permanent Secretary of the Swedish Academy
- Preceded by: Henning Hamilton
- Succeeded by: Carl David af Wirsén

Bror Emil Hildebrand (22 February 1806 in Madesjö – 30 August 1884) was a Swedish archaeologist, numismatist and museum director. From 1837 to 1879 he was Custodian of Ancient Monuments and Secretary of the Royal Swedish Academy of Letters. From 1847 he was a member of the Royal Swedish Academy of Sciences, and from 1866 a member of the Swedish Academy. In 1866, he founded the Swedish History Museum in Stockholm.

In 1830 Hildebrand became reader in numismatics at the university of Lund. About this time he was also taught archaeology by C.J. Thomsen in nearby Copenhagen. This led to Hildebrand's introduction of Thomsen's famous three-age system in Sweden. His main scholarly legacy lies within the field of Medieval Anglo-Saxon numismatics, where he produced pioneering catalogues and studies. Much of this work was indirectly due to agricultural reforms in Sweden that led to Viking Period silver coin hoards surfacing at a rate never seen before or after Hildebrand's day; the 1864 edition of Hildebrand's Anglo-Saxon coins in the Swedish Royal Coin Cabinet drew on the evidence of 64 Swedish hoards alongside other European finds to establish the basic chronology of the late Anglo-Saxon coinage, much of which has remained valid after more than a century of subsequent research.

Hildebrand was the father of archaeologist Hans Hildebrand and teacher both to him and to archaeologist Oscar Montelius.

Cultural offices
Preceded by Lars Magnus Enberg	Swedish Academy, Seat No 11; 1866-84	Succeeded by Clas Theodor Odhner
