= Faustman =

Faustman is a surname. Notable people with the surname include:

- Denise Faustman, American physician and medical researcher
- Hampe Faustman (1919–1961), Swedish actor and film director
- Mollie Faustman (1883–1966), Swedish painter, illustrator, journalist, and author
