= Ewerlöf =

Ewerlöf is a surname. Notable people with the surname include:

- Elsa Ewerlöf (1887–1979), Swedish politician
- Hans Ewerlöf (1929–2022), Swedish diplomat
- Katarina Ewerlöf, Swedish actress
- Malin Ewerlöf-Krepp, Swedish middle-distance runner
- Oskar Ewerlöf (1876–1934), Swedish diplomat
