= Agda Montelius =

Swedish philanthropist

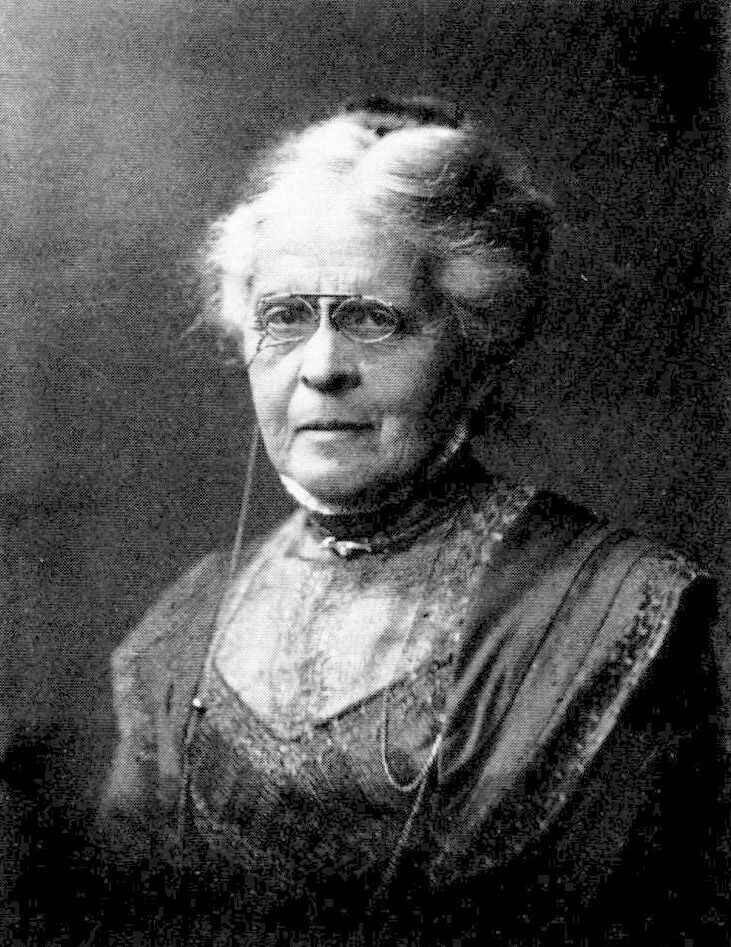
- Born: 23 April 1850; Köping, Sweden
- Died: 27 October 1920 (aged 70); Stockholm, Sweden
- Known for: Philanthropist, woman's rights activist
- Spouse: Oscar Montelius (m. 1871)

Agda Georgina Dorothea Alexandra Montelius (née Reuterskiöld; 23 April 1850 – 27 October 1920) was a Swedish philanthropist and feminist. She was a leading figure of the Swedish philanthropy, active for the struggle of women's suffrage, and chairwoman of the Fredrika Bremer Association in 1903–1920.

== Biography ==
Montelius was born in Köping, Sweden in 1850, the daughter of the government defence minister and noble lieutenant general Alexander Reuterskiöld and Anna Schenström. She was educated at the fashionable girls' school Hammarstedtska flickskolan in Stockholm.

On 20 September 1871, she married the Swedish archaeologist and professor Oscar Montelius (1843–1921).

She was described as diminutive, calm, kind and thoughtful, dutiful and always busy with her many projects. She had bad eyesight and eventually became blind in one eye. Her own personal ideals was simple and strict.

Montelius was regarded as a central figure and an ideal among the women of the higher middle class in Stockholm. Lydia Wahlström often engaged her as an exam witness for the students of the girls' school Åhlinska skolan.

== Philanthropic work ==
Montelius was the leading figure of the Swedish philanthropy in the early 20th century. Her principle was to help people help themselves.

She was member of the committee (1885–1901) of the women's society Nya Idun (New Idun) and its chairperson (1900–1901); the Maria skyddsförening (Maria Protection Society) 1879–1892, co-founder and chairperson of Föreningen för välgörenhetens ordnande or FVO (Society of Organised Charity) in 1889–1911 as well as managing director of the FVO central committee in 1911–1920. She was a member of the central committee in the Sällskapet för uppmuntran av öm och sedlig modersvård (Society for the Encouragement of Tender and Decent Motherly Care) in 1901–1920, co-founder and committee member of the Centralförbundet för socialt arbete (Central Committee of Social Work) or CSA in 1903–1909 and Svenska fattigvårdsförbundet (Swedish Poor Care Society) in 1909–1920.

== Women's rights activism ==
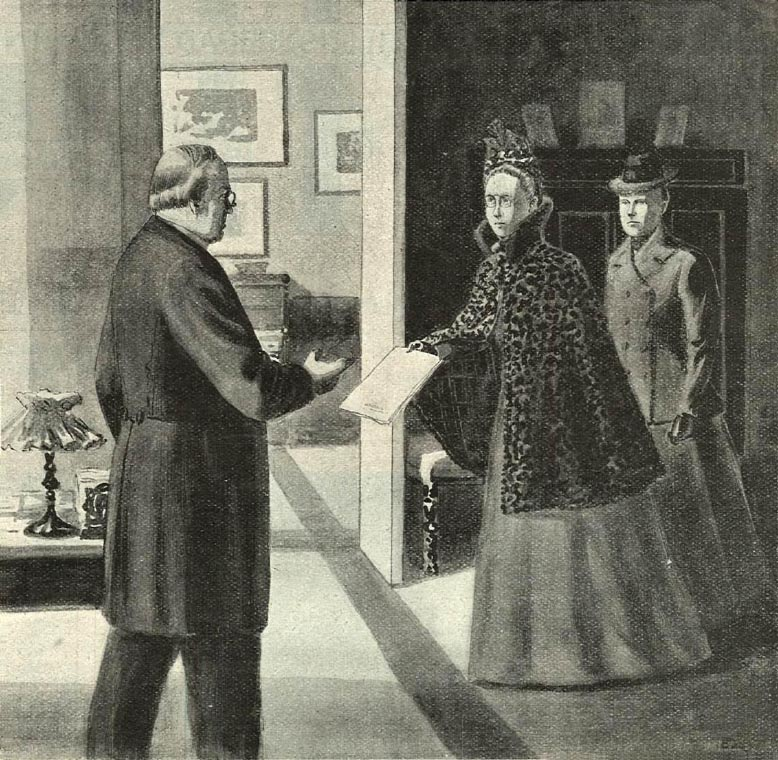
Agda Montelius and Gertrud Adelborg presents the petition of woman suffrage to Prime Minister Erik Gustaf Boström in 1899

Through her philanthropic work, she also became involved with the work for women's rights. She was a supporter of Difference feminism and believed it to be important for women to participate in politics and the organization and formation of society on order to protect the rights of the sick, the weak and needing and to make society a home.

In 1886, Montelius officially became a member of the women's rights organisation of Sophie Adlersparre: the Fredrika Bremer Association or FBF. Two years prior, she had been one of its co-founders. Formally, the FBF was headed by Hans Hildebrand because Adlersparre thought it necessary for the society to be headed by a male for it to be taken seriously. In reality, however, Adlersparre functioned as its chairperson, and upon the death of Adlersparre in 1895, she was succeeded by Montelius. Montelius was initially called vice chairman, but in 1903, she formally became chairman, officially the first female chairperson of the FBF.

The goal of the FBF was to work for women's rights, but previously, it had not worked for women's suffrage. In 1899, a delegation from the FBF presented a suggestion of women's suffrage to Prime Minister Erik Gustaf Boström. The delegation was headed by Montelius, accompanied by Gertrud Adelborg, who had written the demand. This was the first time the Swedish women's movement themselves had officially presented a demand for suffrage.

In 1902, the Swedish National Association for Women's Suffrage (Landsföreningen för kvinnans politiska rösträtt, LKPR) was founded. Montelius never became a formal member, probably because of her chairmanship of the FBF, but she was informally active for the LKPR. She performed many tasks for the LKPR, she made the resources and the members of the FBF available for service in the LKPR, and she made the paper of the FBF, Dagny, the spokes organ of the LKPR until 1911. In 1911, when the LKPR abandoned its political neutrality by a resolution of boycott against political parties opposing woman suffrage, she stopped the use of the FBF's paper Dagny as the paper of LKPR.

She was a consultant in the governmental committee for the reformation of the marriage rights law in 1912, which eventually (in 1920) led to husband and wife being given equal rights within marriage.

== Peace activism ==
Montelius was also active within the peace movement, during which FBF again collaborated with the LKPR. During World War I, the LKPR took the initiative for a peace organisation formed by women of the neutral countries with the aim to form pressure on the neutral governments to act as mediators between the warring parties. The Peace Movement was formed by the LKPR with members also from the Fredrika Bremer Association, KFUK, the social democratic women's organisations among others, with Anna Whitlock, Emilia Broomé and Kerstin Hesselgren as leading members. A great peace manifestation was to take place 19 February 1915 organised by the Swedish women with support and participation also from the women of Denmark and Norway. However, on 18 February, Montelius was called to meet with Queen Victoria of Baden, who demanded a stop of "The foolish presumption of women" to involve in politics. King Gustav V of Sweden interrupted and said that women were of course entitled to present demands to the government, but that the present situation made it difficult. The king referred the matter to Knut Wallenberg, Minister for Foreign Affairs, who warned them that such an action could damage Swedish neutrality. The action was therefore silenced in Sweden and Norway as well as in Denmark. However, the Swedish Peace Movement did send 16 delegates to the International Congress of Women at The Hague in April 1915.

== Award ==
She was awarded the Swedish Royal Medal Illis Quorum in 1910.

== See also ==
- List of peace activists

== Other sources ==
- Österberg, Carin et al. (1990) Svenska kvinnor: föregångare, nyskapare (Lund: Signum) ISBN 91-87896-03-6 (Swedish)
- Barbro Hedwall; Susanna Eriksson Lundqvist (2011) Vår rättmätiga plats. Om kvinnornas kamp för rösträtt (Stockholm: Förlag Bonnier) ISBN 978-91-7424-119-8
