= Amanda Kerfstedt =

Swedish author and translator (1835–1920)

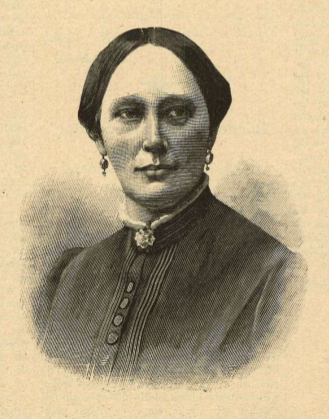
Amanda Kerfstedt

Hilda Augusta Amanda Kerfstedt, née Hallström (5 June 1835, in Eskilstuna – 10 April 1920, in Stockholm), was a Swedish novelist, playwright and translator. She was a popular and noted writer in late 19th and early 20th century Sweden, and participated in public debate. She was also engaged in the movement for women's rights, and active in the Fredrika Bremer Association and Married Woman's Property Rights Association. As a feminist, she focused on the debate around sexual equality, and was critical to the contemporary sexual double standards for men and women. As such, she was one of the participants in the Nordic sexual morality debate, the public debate in Swedish papers, books and plays, which took place during the 1880s. Kerfstedt was a member of the women's association Nya Idun and one of its first committee members. She was the editor of the feminist paper Dagny, the publication of the Fredrika Bremer Association, in 1888–1891. She was especially noted within the debate on children's literature.

== Early and personal life ==
Kerfstedt was born to Sven August Hallström, mayor of Eskilstuna, and Albertina Dybeck, and was the maternal niece to scientist Richard Dybeck. She married Hedemora parish vicar Bengt Gustaf Lindgren (d. 1858) in 1855, and Petrus Kerfstedt (d. 1906), principal at the Tomteboda institute for the blind, in 1872. She had two children; her son Hellen Lindgren became a well known literary critic.

== Works ==
- Vid vägkanten: berättelser och skizzer. 1-2. Stockholm: Björck. 1880–1883. OCLC 186949660.
- Kärlek och andra berättelser. Stockholm: Beijer. 1885. OCLC 1273316587.
- Eva: berättelse. Stockholm: Hæggström. 1888. OCLC 1023311861.
- I vind och motvind: noveller och utkast. Stockholm: Beijer. 1889. OCLC 186040780.
- Holger Vide. Stockholm: Geber. 1893. OCLC 186040771.
- Bränningar: verklighetsbilder. Stockholm: Geber. 1899. OCLC 67888403.
- Reflexer. Iduns romanbibliotek. Stockholm: Idun. 1901. OCLC 942496747.
- Åtta dagars skilsmässa. Stockholm: Nyman. 1908. OCLC 186718075.
- Maja: en kärlekshistoria från en romantisk tid. Stockholm: Geber. 1916. OCLC 186180782.
- Synd: noveller av det moderna genombrottets kvinnor. Stockholm: Ordfront. 1993. ISBN 9789173244251.
  - Contains the author's Synd, originally published in Finsk Tidskrift in 1881.

=== Children's literature ===
- Tiggargossen eller Qvastgubbens dukater: svenskt original. Barnens egen boksamling. Stockholm: Sigfrid Flodin. 1865. OCLC 924451284.
- Signild och hennes vänner: ett exempel för unga flickor. Barnens egen boksamling. Vol. 2. Stockholm: Sigfrid Flodin. 1865. OCLC 938197320.
- Små och stora: berättelser för barn. Stockholm: Beijer. 1882. OCLC 186660812.
- "Glädjens blomster" med flera berättelser för barn. P. A. Norstedt & söners ungdomsböcker. Vol. 5. With illustrations by Ottilia Adelborg, Jenny Nyström and Hanna Frosterus-Segerstråle. Stockholm: Norstedt. 1891. OCLC 1079926799.
- Bland fält och ängar: berättelse för barn och ungdom. Stockholm: Geber. 1895. OCLC 186040762.
- En liten prinsessa: saga. With 7 prints by Jenny Nyström. Stockholm: Hökerberg. 1898. OCLC 247142594.
- Blåklint: berättelser för barn. Stockholm: Geber. 1902. OCLC 186447565.
- Susanne: ett ungt hjärtas historia. Stockholm: Hierta. 1903. OCLC 186447578.
- Tipp: berättelse för barn. P. A. Norstedt & Söners ungdomsböcker. Vol. 82. Stockholm: Norstedt. 1903. OCLC 186457510.
- Abdullah: sångaren från Beda och andra berättelser för barn. P. A. Norstedt & Söners Ungdomsböcker. Vol. 103. Stockholm: Norstedt. 1908. OCLC 186737004.
