= Hierta family =

Hierta Hjerta
- Finnish-Swedish-Russian noble family
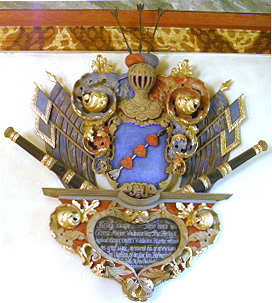
- Arms of the Hierta family
- Country: Sweden, Finland and Russia
- Place of origin: Västergötland, Sweden
- Members: Lars Johan Hierta

The Hierta family (Swedish: [ˈjæ̂ʈːa], lit. "Heart"; Russian: Гиерта, romanized: Gierta; ), also Hjerta and Järta is a Swedish-Finnish-Russian noble family – uradel – of Swedish origin. The Finnish branch of the Hierta family was naturalized as a Finnish noble family, in what was then the Grand Duchy of Finland, at the Finnish house of nobility in 1818.

== Notable members ==
- Lars Johan Hierta (1801–1872), Newspaper publisher
- Anna Hierta-Retzius (1841–1924), Women's rights activist and philanthropist
- Hans Hierta (1774–1847), Swedish administrator and revolutionary
