= Mollie Faustman =

Swedish painter, illustrator, journalist and author

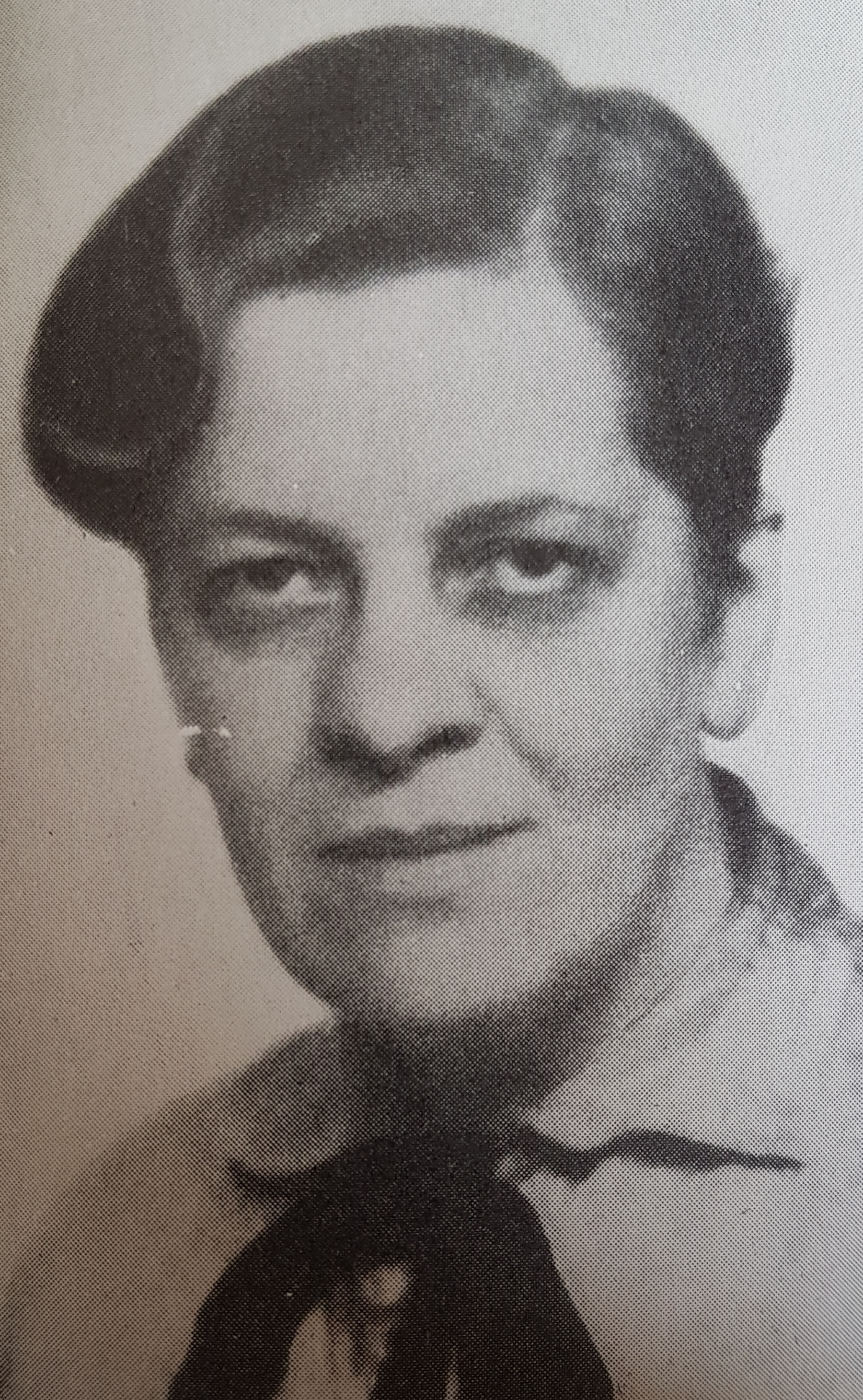
- Born: 1883; Stockholm, Sweden
- Died: 1966 (aged 82–83)
- Education: Valand Art School
- Movement: expressionism

Mollie Faustman (pseudonym, la Vagabonde; Stockholm, 1883 - Stockholm, 1966) was a Swedish painter, illustrator, journalist and author.

== Biography ==
Originally from the district of Kungsholmen, Mollie Faustman was one of the three daughters of engineer Edvard Faustman and professor Alma Karsten; she was the paternal granddaughter of Wendela Hebbe and Lars Johan Hierta.

She studied with the Swedish artist Carl Wilhelmson at the Valand Art School in Gothenburg from 1905 to 1908. In 1910, she moved to Paris to complete her apprenticeship with Henri Matisse.

Faustman married Gösta Törneqvist from 1910 to 1915, before marrying Gösta Chatham a second time from 1917 to 1926. They had two children, Tuttan Faustman-Hedberg (1917-1999), and Hampe Faustman (1919-1961). She was involved in the construction of innovative pedagogical schools such as Olofskolan and Viggbyholmsskolan in the Stockholm area.

Faustman is buried at Skogskyrkogården Cemetery in Stockholm.

== Artistic career ==
As early as 1909, Faustman presented her first works alongside the artists Gösta Törneqvist, Frans Timén and Carl Luthander. She focused mainly on brightly colored landscapes with characteristics of expressionism and romance, including children's motifs. She has also done portraits, including Uno Henning, Ture Nerman and Hanna Borrie.

Faustman was a member of the artists' association Optimisterna from 1924 to 1932, and exhibited with the group at Liljevalchs konsthall. She joined the art group Independentna. She had several solo exhibitions at the House of Artists in Stockholm in the 1930s and 1940s, and participated in group exhibitions imbued with contemporary Christian art. In 1949 she produced the monumental painting Människans glädjeämnen at Härnösands småskoleseminarium.

Faustman is represented at the Nationalmuseum, Moderna Museet, Gothenburg Art Museum, Länsmuseet Gävleborg, Östergötlands Museum, Norrköpings konstmuseum and Hälsingland Museum.

== Literary career ==
Under the pseudonym la Vagabonde, Faustman wrote regularly in the newspapers Idun and Dagens Nyheter. In 1926, she played a major role in the campaign that led to the closure of the tabloid magazine Fäderneslandet. She also published several books, produced book illustrations and drew comic strips such as Tuttan and Putte in the newspaper Dagens Nyheter.
