= Sophie Adlersparre =

Publisher, editor, writer and women's rights activist

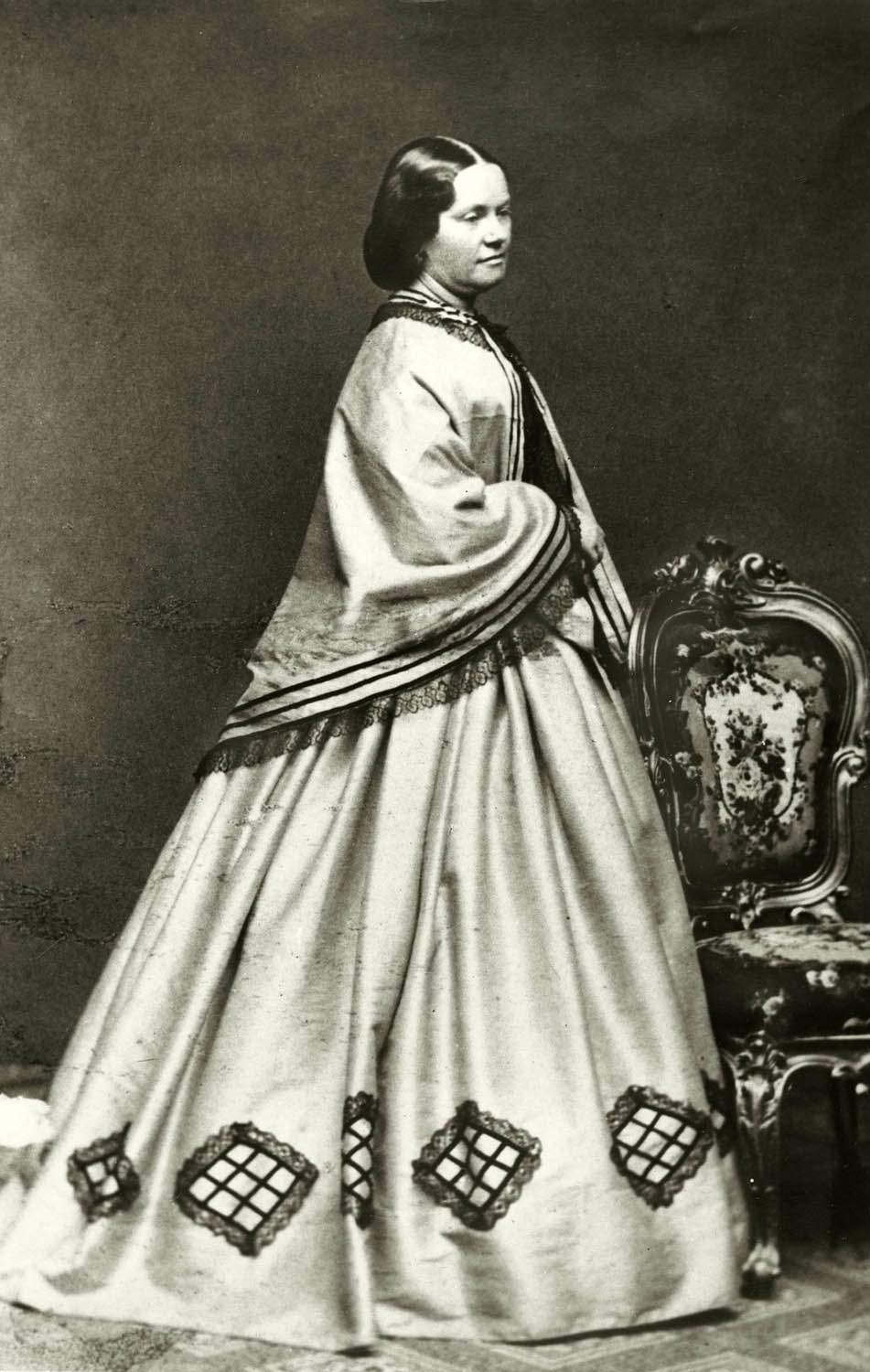
- Sophie Adlersparre, photograph by Bertha Valerius (1860s)
- Born: Carin Sophie Leijonhufvud; 6 July 1823; Helgerum, Västrum, Kalmar County, Sweden
- Died: 27 June 1895 (aged 71); Ström, near Södertälje
- Other name: Esselde
- Occupations: publisher, editor and writer
- Known for: Women's rights activist. Founded the Fredrika Bremer Association (Fredrika-Bremer-förbundet), the oldest women's rights organisation in Sweden (1884).
- Spouse: Axel Adlersparre
- Awards: Illis quorum meruere labores

Carin Sophie Adlersparre (née Leijonhufvud; 6 July 1823 – 27 June 1895), known by her pen-name Esselde, was a Swedish feminist, writer and publisher who was one of the pioneers of the 19th-century women's rights movement in Sweden. She was the founder and editor of the first women's magazine in Scandinavia, Home Review (Tidskrift för hemmet), in 1859–1885; co-founder of Friends of Handicraft (Handarbetets vänner) in 1874–1887; founder of the Fredrika Bremer Association (Fredrika-Bremer-förbundet) in 1884; and one of the first two women to be a member of a state committee in Sweden in 1885.

== Life ==
Adlersparre was born into the Leijonhufvud family, as the daughter of lieutenant colonel Baron Erik Gabriel Knutsson Leijonhufvud and Sofie Emerentia Hoppenstedt. She was educated privately at home, and then spent two years at a finishing school, the fashionable Bjurström Pension (Bjurströmska pensionen) in Stockholm. In 1869, she married the nobleman commander Axel Adlersparre (1812–1879) and became the stepmother of his five children. Her husband was described as supportive of her social reform work.

Sophie Adlersparre was an admirer of feminist author Fredrika Bremer and became engaged in feminist issues through her friendship with Rosalie Roos, who returned to Sweden with an interest in women's rights in 1857 after spending several years in the United States. During this time, there was a public discussion in Sweden about women's rights that was prompted by Fredrika Bremer's 1856 novel Hertha. The discussion resulted in the abolition of guardianship over unmarried women and the granting of legal majority to women (1858–63) and the establishment of the first state school for women, the Royal Advanced Female Teachers' Seminary (Högre lärarinneseminariet) in 1861.

== Home Review ==
In 1859, Sophie Adlersparre and Rosalie Roos founded Home Review (Tidskrift för hemmet), the first women's magazine in Scandinavia, with the financial support of salon hostess Fredrika Limnell. It was the first regular platform for the debate on women's rights, gender roles, and feminism in Sweden, and it was an immediate success. Adlersparre and Roos shared the position of head editor until 1868, when Roos retired and Adlersparre continued as the sole editor-in-chief. As a journalist, she became known under her pen-name "Esselde". In 1886, Home Review was cancelled and replaced with the new women's magazine Dagny. Adlersparre worked as editor-in-chief of Dagny from 1886 to 1888 and remained on the paper's board until 1894.

== Feminist work ==
Sophie Adlersparre did not focus on women's suffrage, though women were granted municipal suffrage in Sweden in 1862. The primary focus of Adlersparre's and her magazine's social activism was women's access to education and the professions, which would allow them to be financially independent. As she put it, "Women need work, and work needs women".

In 1862, she organized evening classes for women to educate them as professionals. In 1863, she established a secretarial bureau which became a successful employment agency. In 1864, inspired by her future sister-in-law, Sofia Adlersparre, she petitioned the Swedish parliament to allow women to study at the Royal Swedish Academy of Arts on equal terms with men. At the time, the Academy only let women study on special dispensation, and although she was a successful artist, Sofia Adlersparre was not allowed to study there. Sophie Adlersparre's petition led to a debate in parliament, and finally a reform in 1864 allowing women to study at the Academy on the same terms as men.

In 1866, she co-founded of the Stockholm Reading Parlor (Stockholms läsesalong), which became a free library for women that worked to increase women's access to education and the professions. Her goal with the free libraries for women was: "For a continuing self-education and for a bigger and wider outlook upon life".

Her interest in women's education was not only motivated by her wish to see women professionally active, but also her wish for them to be active in public society. In her words, "The more we wish and expect from women's participation in the reform of society, the more important it is that this work is well prepared". Many women's education reforms were introduced during this period. After the Girls' School Committee of 1866 (Flickskolekommittén 1866) reform, women were given access to university education (1870–1873) and female secondary schools were given state support (1874). In 1885–1887, Adlersparre was a member of the Girl School Committee of 1885 (Flickskolekommittén 1885), which was assigned by the government to investigate and suggest reforms to the female education system. This was the first state committee in Sweden to have female members: Sophie Adlersparre and Hilda Caselli. Additionally, girls' school founder and director Maria Henschen worked as an assistant to Adlersparre. Adlersparre was an early member of the women's association Nya Idun, joining in 1885, the same year it was founded.

== Other work ==
In 1864–1865, she participated in the founding of the Swedish Red Cross.

In 1874, Adlersparre co-founded Friends of Handicraft (Handarbetets vänner) with Hanna Winge and served as its chairperson until 1887. The purpose of the organisation was to raise the quality and thereby the status of women's handicraft work, which at the time was a very important source of income for women in need of self-support.

Adlersparre was involved in the Swedish literary scene. She was an admirer of Viktoria Benedictsson and she supported Selma Lagerlöf financially during her work. During the last years of her life, she worked on a biography of Fredrika Bremer, but was not able to complete it.

== Fredrika Bremer Association ==
Sophie Adlersparre is perhaps best known as the founder of the Fredrika Bremer Association (Fredrika-Bremer-Förbundet, FBF) in 1884, the first women's rights organisation in Sweden, named for feminist author Fredrika Bremer. Formally, the women's rights supporter Hans Hildebrand was made the official chair of the FBF, because Adlersparre believed that it would be taken more seriously if it was headed by a man. However, Adlersparre acted as the de facto chairperson until her death in 1895, when she was succeeded by Agda Montelius. Adlersparre felt that it was important for men to be a part of the work for equality, and in addition to women such as Ellen Anckarsvärd (referred to as her successor in the Swedish women's rights movement), Ellen Fries, Gertrud Adelborg and Fredrika Limnell, she welcomed men such as Hans Hildebrand and Gustav Sjöberg. The purpose of the organization was to "work for a healthy and calm progress in elevating women morally and intellectually as well as socially and economically". One of the FBF's functions was to offer scholarships, which were arranged by Mathilda Silow.

== Recognition ==
Sophie Adlersparre was awarded the Illis quorum meruere labores medal in 1895 for her contributions to Swedish society.

== Literature ==
- Lilla Focus Uppslagsbok [Little Focus Encyclopedia] (in Swedish). Focus Uppslagsböcker AB. 1979.
- "Sophie Adlersparre". Göteborgs universitetsbibliotek (in Swedish). 1 September 2012.
- Sigrid Leijonhufvud (1910). Victoria Benedictsson, Ernst Ahlgren och Esselde : en brefväxling (in Swedish). Stockholm.
- Sigrid Leijonhufvud (1922–23). Sophie Adlersparre 1–2.
- U. Manns, Den sanna frigörelsen: Fredrika-Bremer-förbundet 1884–1921 (1997)
- Anna Nordenstam (2001). Begynnelser: Litteraturforskningens pionjärkvinnor 1850–1930.
- Barbro Hedwall (2011). Susanna Eriksson Lundqvist (ed.). Vår rättmätiga plats. Om kvinnornas kamp för rösträtt [Our Rightful Place. About women's struggle for suffrage] (in Swedish). Förlag Bonnier. ISBN 978-91-7424-119-8.
- "Ideologer i olika tider : om Sophie Adlersparre, Stina Rodenstam och Anna-Maja Nylén" in Den feminina textilen : makt och mönster, 2005, Birgitta Svensson and Louise Waldén (editors), ISBN 9171084991

== External link ==
- Works by or about Sophie Adlersparre at the Internet Archive
