= Typology (archaeology) =

Physical classification of artifacts

In archaeology, a typology is the result of the classification of things according to their physical characteristics. The products of the classification, i.e. the classes, are also called types. Most archaeological typologies organize portable artifacts into types, but typologies of larger structures, including buildings, field monuments, fortifications or roads, are equally possible. A typology helps to manage a large mass of archaeological data. According to Doran and Hodson, "this superficially straightforward task has proved one of the most time consuming and contentious aspects of archaeological research".

== Philosophical background ==
Typology is based on a view of the world familiar from Plato's metaphysics called essentialism. Essentialism is the idea that the world is divided into real, discontinuous and immutable "kinds". This idea is the basis for most typological constructions particularly of stone artefacts where essential forms are often thought of as "mental templates" or combinations of traits that are favoured by the maker. Variation in artifact form and attributes is seen as a consequence of the imperfect realization of the template and is usually attributed to differences in raw material properties or individuals' technical competences.

== History ==
Although the principles were not clearly articulated, the application of basic typological techniques can occasionally be found in the work of early modern antiquaries. As early as the 1530s, John Leland successfully identified Roman bricks (under the misleading designation "Briton brykes") at several different sites, distinguishing them from more modern bricks by size and shape. Antiquaries began to recognise in the late 16th century that medieval monumental effigies represented with their legs crossed were likely to be older than those with straight legs. In the late 17th century, John Aubrey worked out crude evolutionary sequences based on typological distinctions for medieval architecture, handwriting, shield-shapes and costume, describing his technique as "comparative antiquitie". The outline of the development of medieval Gothic architecture was further refined in the 18th century, notably by James Bentham in his 1771 History and Antiquities of Ely Cathedral, and culminated in the clear sequence of styles published by Thomas Rickman in 1817. Richard Gough, in his Sepulchral Monuments in Great Britain (1786–99), used comparative and typological methodology to analyse the development of English church monuments.

In the 19th and early 20th centuries archaeological typologies continued to be constructed using a combination of empirical observation and intuition. According to Eggers, most archaeologists give Oscar Montelius the credit for the first serious application of the typological method, but in Eggers' view, his contemporary colleague from Stockholm, Hans Hildebrand made important contributions to the development of the methodology as well. Hildebrand published a fundamental paper on the development of fibulae in the 1870s using the typological method, whereas Montelius at the same time went to international congresses and published smaller papers on this method.

Augustus Pitt-Rivers also made significant contributions to the development of typology. In his lecture to the Society of Arts in 1891 Pitt-Rivers says, "When, as in the case of most prehistoric objects.., the date cannot be given, then recourse must be had to the sequence of type, and that is what I term 'Typology.' It is not an accepted term, and I am not aware that it has been applied before to the study of sequence of the types of the arts. But it appears to me that a name is wanted for this branch of investigation, which the term 'Typology' supplies."

Another early example is the typology published in 1899 by Flinders Petrie for the objects (mainly pottery) found in 900 prehistoric Egyptian graves. This typology formed the basis for his manual seriation of the graves.

Later on William Albright became the leader of dating based on the typology of Levantine pottery for excavations in the Middle East.

== Quantitative methodologies ==
With the development of statistical techniques and numerical taxonomy in the 1960s, mathematical methods (including cluster analysis, principal components analysis, correspondence analysis and factor analysis) have been used to build typologies. These techniques provide a qualitative way to articulate the degrees of consistency among particular attributes. Correlation coefficients created by these methods help archaeologists discern between meaningful and useless similarities between artefacts. During the 1990s, archaeologists began to use phylogenetic methods borrowed from cladistics.

== Qualitative methodologies ==
=== Morphological/descriptive typology ===
One class of typology consists of a descriptive or morphological approach. It is based on the physical characteristics and the external features of an artifact. Some examples of morphological and descriptive typologies would be categorizing artifacts distinctively on their weight, height, color, material, or whichever class the individual decides upon.

==== Projectile point typology ====
An example of morphological/descriptive typology consists of when an archaeologist excavates a site and finds dozens upon dozens of Native American arrowheads. The archaeologist narrows down their classification by organizing the pieces into morphological/descriptive groups. So, the projectile points could be sorted by weight, height, color, material, or however the archaeologists prefers. One of the first national typology bases available on the web exhibits how the arrowhead artifacts found are classified among the fifty states by region, state, or nationwide.

In this particular example, the arrowheads are classified by their shape. The categories consist of: notched, stemmed, lanceolate, and other projectile points. Each category may also be narrowed down into subsequent ones.

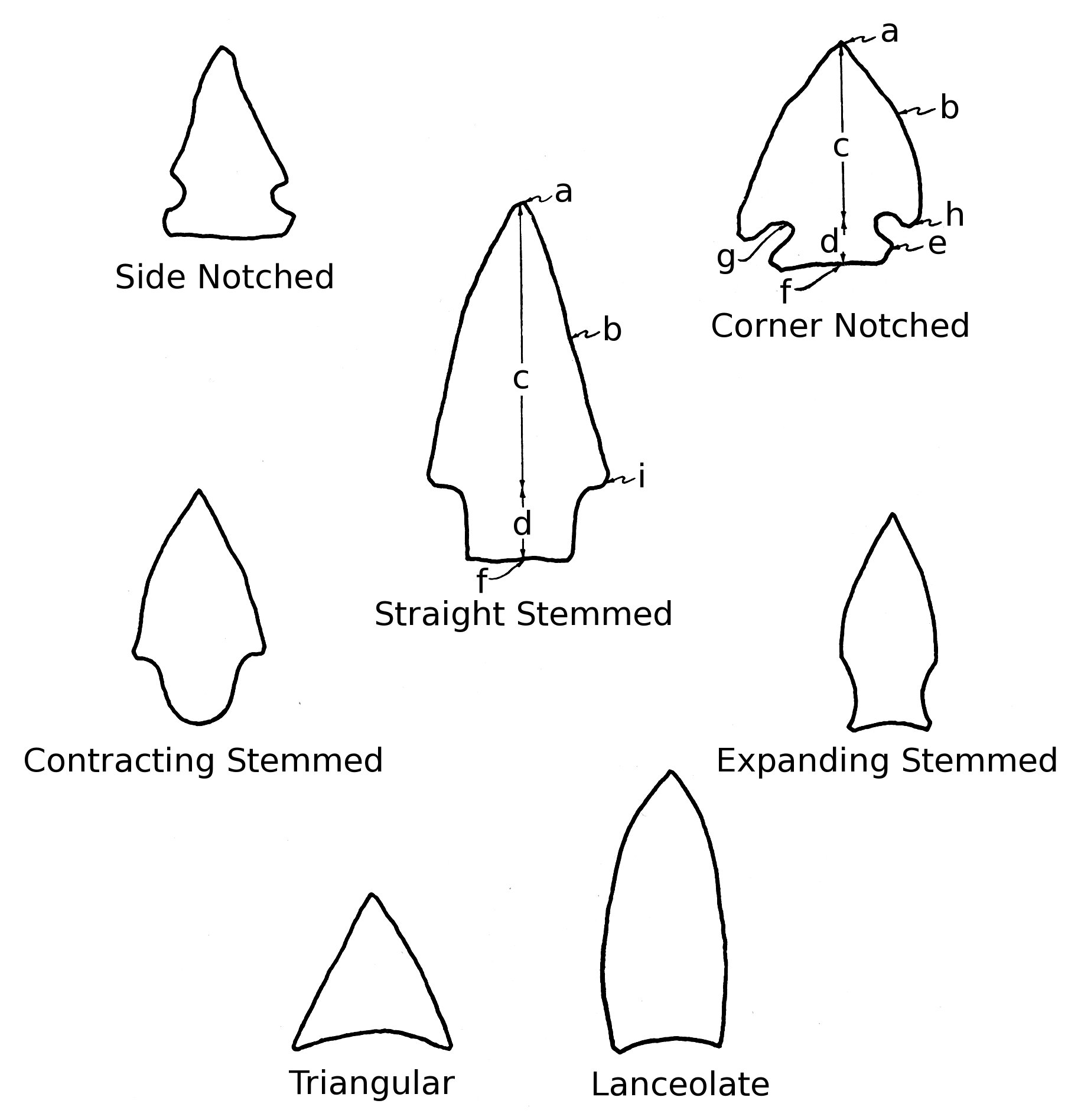
An example of morphological/descriptive typology. Archaeologist classified these arrowheads based on the projectile point shape.

=== Chronological typology ===
This type consists of sequential ordering of archaeological artifacts merely based on form. It involves collecting dates or relative dates that establishes the position in time the artifact lies in to reflect the civilization/events of a current region. A chronological typology is made up of diagnostic artifacts, or relics that suggests a particular event/people occurred during a period of time

=== Functional typology ===
Artifacts organized into this kind of typology are sorted by the use they serve rather than the looks they have or the chronological sequence they possess. In some cases, the artifacts may not be removed because of the functional purpose they exhibit, and the restoration of the pieces can be more difficult than other types of objects.

=== Stylistic typology ===
This type of classification displays information about the artifact via the object's display. Stylistic typology is not to be confused with classification of certain styles, for that would just entail organizing artifacts based on how they look. This type of typology accounts for information told through the artifact. Pottery is an example of a stylistic typology because the artifacts provide information on artistic evolution.

== Ceramics ==
For cultures that produced pottery, archaeologists invariably spend a great deal of time defining ceramic "types." Each type is a series of attributes which distinguishes one group of pottery (whether whole vessels or potsherds) from all other groups of pottery, such that each type was produced in a single time and place. Ideally, the attributes used to identify types are ones that are identifiable with the naked eye, and are found on small fragments of pottery, so that the sorting of potsherds into types is quick and straightforward. By sorting potsherds in terms of types, archaeologists can examine a series of potsherds (including those lying on a site surface) and quickly suggest when and where the pottery was made. By extension, they can estimate when a prehistoric site was used, whether there are any traded pieces, and so on.

The names assigned to the ceramic types are arbitrary. In United States, the common practice is a two-part name, the first part being an arbitrary geographic reference and the second part providing a brief description of the pottery's most obvious design attributes. Thus, for example, the type "Flagstaff Black-on-white" was first defined using a collection from the vicinity of Flagstaff, Arizona, and its primary design attribute is the use of black paint on a white background.

Non-archaeologists should be aware of the limitations of ceramic typology. All such typologies are abstractions, and fail to describe all of the variability in an artistic tradition. Professional disagreement over specifics is common. Changes in ceramic design did not happen overnight, and archaeological typologies tend to break continua of design evolution into arbitrary (but highly useful) units. Most archaeological dates are approximate.

== Art ==
In the middle of the twentieth century, German photographers Bernd and Hilla Becher raised typology to an art form by photographing countless similar architectural features including water towers, workers' houses and industrial landscapes.

== See also ==
- Taxonomy (general)
- Taxonomy (biology)
- Seriation (archaeology)
- Lithic analysis
