= Walborg Lagerwall =

Swedish cellist

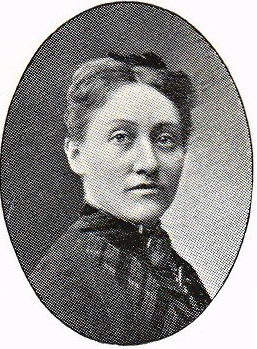

Walborg Concordia Maria Lagerwall (8 August 1851 – 3 December 1940) was a Swedish cellist.

She was a student of the Royal College of Music, Stockholm 1872–1874, and toured Scandinavia in 1879–1883. She played the violoncello in the troupe Damtrion ('The Ladies' Trio') 1881–1883 together with Hilma Åberg and Hilma Lindberg, and at the Royal Swedish Opera in 1884–1889.
