= Hertha (novel) =

Novel by Fredrika Bremer, first published in 1856

New Sketches of Everyday Life: Hertha, or, A Soul's History: A Sketch from Real Life
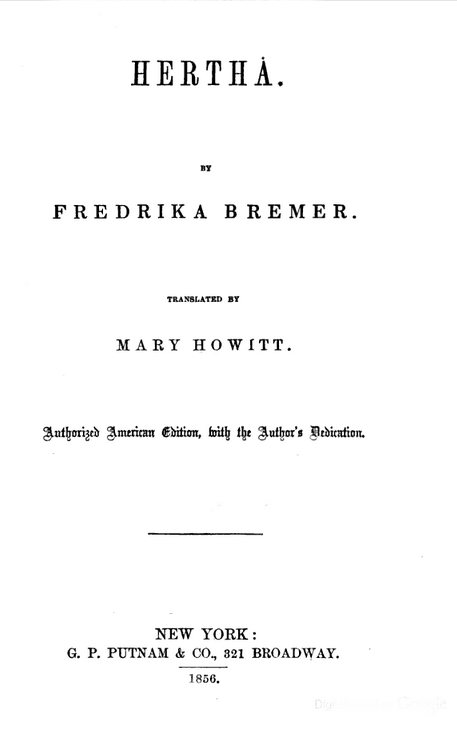
- Author: Frederika Bremer
- Original title: Nya Teckningar ur Hvardagslifvet: Hertha, eller En själs historia: Teckning ur det verkliga livet
- Translator: Mary Howitt
- Publication date: 1854
- English publication date: 1856

Hertha, fully New Sketches of Everyday Life: Hertha, or, A Soul's History: A Sketch from Real Life (Swedish: Nya Teckningar ur Hvardagslifvet: Hertha, eller En själs historia: Teckning ur det verkliga livet) is a Swedish novel by Fredrika Bremer, first published in 1856.

== History ==
The feminist writer Fredrika Bremer published Hertha in 1856. Unlike her other works, she labeled this one a Sketch of from Real Life: she concluded it with an appendix recounting actual Swedish court cases concerning her subject, an assault on the 2nd-class status of women under Sweden's 1734 Civil Code. By its terms, unmarried adult women (unless widowed or divorced) were considered incompetent wards of their male relatives. Bremer and her sister had themselves been required to petition King Charles XIV to emancipate themselves from their wastrel brother.

== Legacy ==
Although Bremer herself soon left for a great journey through Europe and the Levant, her work prompted the Hertha Discussion (Herthadiskussionen) throughout Swedish society, reaching Parliament in 1858. There, the old system was reformed to allow women to petition their nearest courthouse (rather than the royal court) at the age of 25. Five years later, the legislation was revisited and all women were considered to automatically reach legal majority at 25. (The daughters of the Swedish nobility were, however, not able to marry without their father or brother's permission until 1880.) The novel also successfully raised the question of a "women's university". The Royal Seminary, a state school for the education of female teachers, was opened in 1861. Upon her return to Sweden, Bremer expressed her satisfaction with these changes and took a personal interest in the Seminary and its students.

Hertha is regarded as the first feminist novel in Swedish literature. It was the inspiration for Sophie Adlersparre and Rosalie Olivecrona's Home Review, the first women's magazine in Sweden; its continuation Hertha; and Adlersparre's Fredrika Bremer Association, Sweden's first women's rights organization.
