= Hilda Sachs =

Swedish journalist, translator, writer and feminist

Hilda Gustafva Sachs
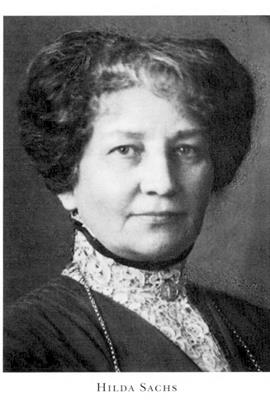
- Born: March 13, 1857; Norrköping, Östergötland, Sweden-Norway
- Died: February 26, 1935 (aged 77)
- Education: Royal Seminary
- Spouse: Carl Fredrik Sachs
- Elected: Board of Directors, National Association for Women's Suffrage (Sweden), 1912–1921

Hilda Gustafva Sachs (13 March 1857, Norrköping – 26 February 1935), was a Swedish journalist, translator, writer and feminist.

She was the daughter of merchant Johan Gustaf Engström and Gustafva Augusta Gustafsson in Norrköping. She worked for some time as a governess in the countryside, and studied at Högre lärarinneseminariet in Stockholm 1878–1881, after which she returned to teaching. In 1886, she married the Jewish florist Carl Fredrik Sachs (1860–1893).

She began her career as a journalist after the death of her spouse in 1893 to support herself and her children, and reported for several papers such as DN, Nya Dagligt Allehanda, SvD and Stockholmsbladet from 1895 until 1920. In 1899, she was the first of her sex to be a delegate at the international journalist conference in Rome, where she represented Swedish paper NDA. In 1902, she was one of the founders of the National Association for Women's Suffrage and was a member of the board there in 1912–1921.

== See also ==
- Maria Cederschiöld

== Sources ==
- http://www.ub.gu.se/kvinn/portaler/arbete/biografier/
- Hilda G Sachs, urn:sbl:6305, Svenskt biografiskt lexikon (art av Ellinor Melander), hämtad 2015-01-02.
