= Hellen Lindgren =

Swedish author and translator

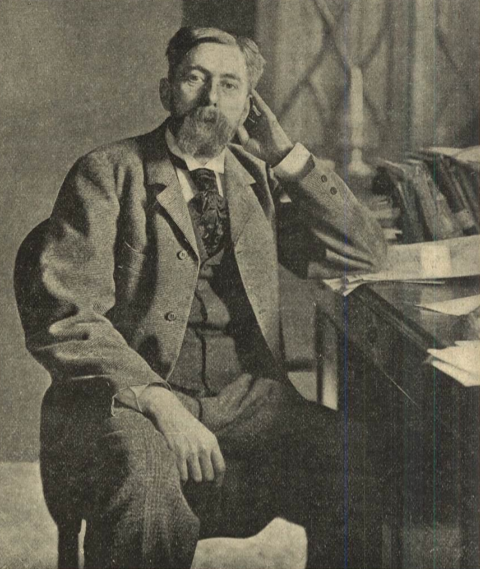
Hellen Lindgren, 1901

Albert Hellen Gustaf Benedikt Lindgren (27 June 1857 – 9 February 1904) was a Swedish author and translator. He was the son of author Amanda Kerfstedt.

Lindgren was born in Hedemora and died in Solna.

== Bibliography ==
- Ryssland och nihilismen. [Stockholm]. 1883. Libris 2778754
- Voltaire och hans strid mot fördomarna i religion och samhälle. Studentföreningen Verdandis småskrifter, 99-0470915-7; 14. Stockholm: Bonnier. 1889. Libris 1490511
- Prosten Lars : svensk originalnovell. Stockholm: Nya Dagligt Allehanda. 1893. Libris 3077060
- Sommarstudier i svensk poesi. Uppsala: Almqvist & Wicksell. 1895. Libris 3077108
- Sveriges vittra storhetstid 1730–1850. Del 1–2. Stockholm. 1895–1896. Libris 363082
- Emile Zola. Skrifter utgifna av Ord och Bild, 99-3235412-0; 6. Stockholm: Wahlström & Widstrand. 1898. Libris 1645477
- Sagoskalden Hans Christian Andersen. Studentföreningen Verdandis småskrifter, 99-0470915-7; 86. Stockholm: Alb. Bonnier. 1900. Libris 1664055
- Skalder och tänkare : litterära essayer. Stockholm: Gernandt. 1900. Libris 367443
- Henrik Ibsen : i hans lifskamp och hans verk. Stockholm: Wahlström & Widstrand. 1903. Libris 477772
- Johan Ludvig Runeberg : ett skaldeporträtt. Stockholm: Ljus. 1904. Libris 367791
- Några diktareporträtt : essayer. Stockholm: Ljus. 1907. Libris 239958
