= Clas Theodor Odhner =

Swedish historian

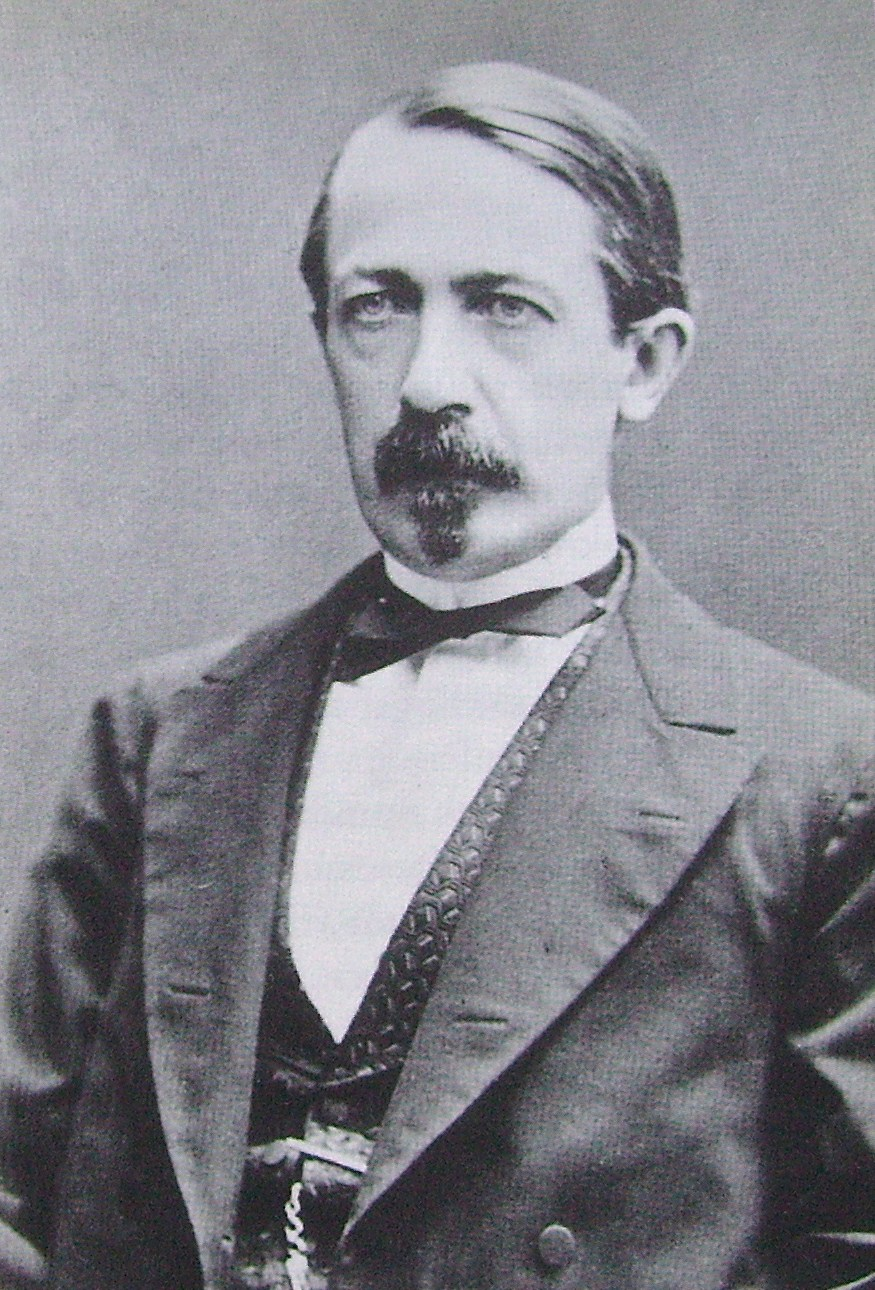

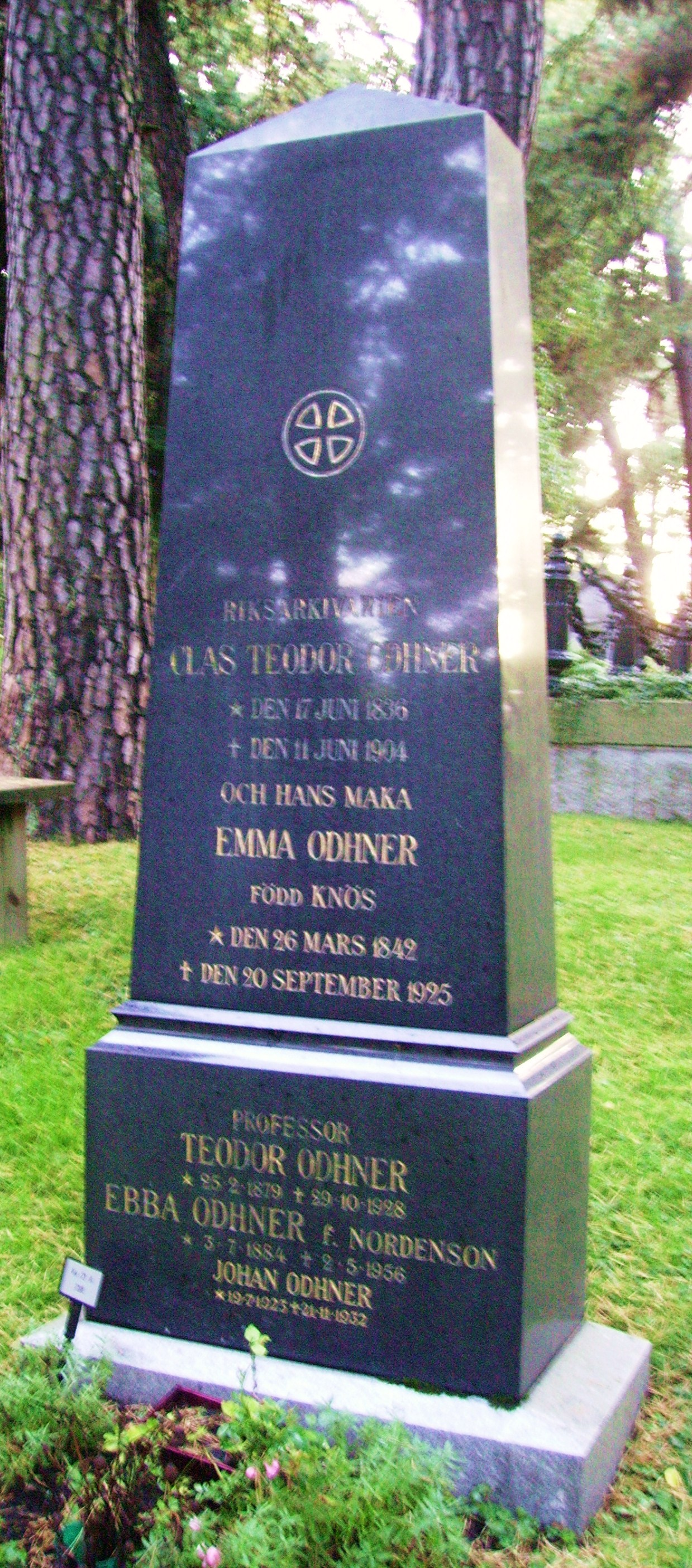
Teodor Odhner's grave in the Norra begravningsplatsen, Stockholm

Clas Jonas Theodor Odhner (17 June 1836 in Alingsås, Sweden – 11 June 1904 in Stockholm, Sweden) was a Swedish historian, and director of the Swedish National Archives (Riksarkivet).

Odhner was the son of a clergyman, and his mother was a sister of Nils Ericson and John Ericsson. Odhner went to school in Skara and matriculated at Uppsala University in 1851, completing the degree of filosofie magister and becoming a docent of History in 1860. He taught at Lund University from 1865, as professor of history from 1870 until 1887, when he was appointed riksarkivarie, director of the National Archives, a position in which he remained until 1901. Odhner was a member of the Second Chamber of the Riksdag 1894–1897. He was elected Member of the Swedish Academy in 1885, and was member of several other learned societies.

Odhner was a productive writer, and the schoolbooks he authored were influential. He was the main mover in the introduction of the new organisation of the archives for government agencies with a number of provincial archives (landsarkiv), to some extent subordinate to the National Archives.

He was father of the zoologist and explorer Teodor Odhner. The engineer Willgodt Odhner was the son of his first cousin.

Cultural offices
Preceded by Bror Emil Hildebrand	Swedish Academy, Seat No 11; 1885-1904	Succeeded by Erik Axel Karlfeldt
