= National Council of Swedish Women =

- Svenska Kvinnors Nationalförbund
- Formation: 1896
- Legal status: Active
- Purpose: Support women's rights
- Official language: Swedish
- Affiliations: International Council of Women (ICW)

National Council of Swedish Women (Swedish: "Svenska Kvinnors Nationalförbund") is the Swedish branch of the International Council of Women.

It was founded in 1896 by Ellen Fries to function as an umbrella organisation for women's organisations in Sweden and represent Sweden at the international congresses of the ICW.

Chairperson

1. 1896-1898: Ellen Anckarsvärd
2. 1898-1909: Anna Hierta-Retzius
3. 1909-1920: Eva Upmark
4. 1920-1927: Bertha Nordenson
5. 1927-1928: Malin Wester-Hallberg
6. 1929–1930: Elisif Theel
7. 1930–1931: Ingegerd Palme
8. 1931–1949: Kerstin Hesselgren
9. 1972–1981: Margit Althin
