= Elsa Ewerlöf =

Swedish politician (1887–1979)

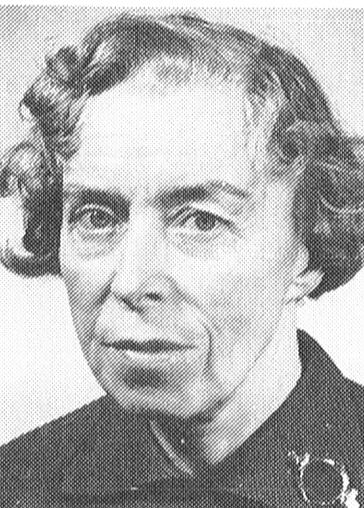
Image of Elsa Ewerlöf

Elsa Ewerlöf, née Löwenadler (4 September 1887 in Gränna - 15 May 1979) was a Swedish politician (Moderate Party).

Ewerlöf was an MP of the Second Chamber of the Parliament of Sweden for Stockholm in 1946–1958.

She was the President of the Fredrika Bremer Association in 1949–1958.
