= Finsk Tidskrift =

Swedish language cultural magazine in Finland

- Categories: Cultural and political magazine
- Frequency: Eight times per year
- Founder: Carl Gustaf Estlander
- Founded: 1876
- Country: Finland
- Based in: Helsinki
- Language: Swedish
- ISSN: 0015-248X
- OCLC: 183206878

Finsk Tidskrift (Swedish: Finnish Journal) is a cultural and political magazine based in Helsinki, Finland, which is published in Swedish eight times a year. It has been in circulation since 1876.

== History and profile ==
Founded in 1876 Finsk Tidskrift is the oldest cultural publication in Finland. It was started as a scholarly journal. The founder was Carl Gustaf Estlander, a Finnish academic and cultural activist. He also served as the editor-in-chief of the magazine from its start in 1876 to 1886. Frederika Runeberg contributed to the magazine between 1877 and 1879.

In the 1880s only 5% of its content focused on politics, and the religious topics were even less covered, just 3% of its content. Finsk Tidskrift was one of the Finnish publications which featured articles on the influence of the Jews in the American film industry and on the positive outcomes of the Jewish migration to Palestine during the pre-World War II period.
