= Lovisa Mathilda Nettelbladt =

Swedish writer

Lovisa Mathilda Nettelbladt (1814–1867), was a Swedish novelist and travel writer. She wrote under the pseudonym m-n. She lived in the United States between 1850 and 1856, and she is foremost known for her travel book about her life in North America, which belongs to the earliest literature published of a Swedish emigrant as well as a Swedish female emigrant to the USA.

== Biography ==
She was born to the merchant Fredrik Nettelbladt and Carolina Elisabet Charlotta Lochner. She was never married. Her father declared bankruptcy in 1838, and she supported herself as a governess. She published a novel in 1824, which was translated to German in 1848. In 1850, her father died, and she left for North America in the company of her friend Hedvig Eleonora Hammarskjöld. She spent six years in the USA, foremost in North Carolina and South Carolina. She supported herself as a governess and by giving lessons to rich women in embroidery and the manufacture of artificial flowers and decorations by wax and feathers. She returned to Sweden in 1856.

In her travel book, Nettelbladt described the often harsh terms of the emigrants. She described the great hospitality and friendliness she had herself experienced and had a good impression of the terms of women in the USA, specifically those belonging to her own category of educated middle-class women, and it was her impression that governesses, and other women of a similar category, were treated much more equally in America than in Europe. Living in North Carolina and South Carolina, she also described the slavery she witnessed in America. On one hand, she described that many enslaved people gave the impression of being content and treated well, and compared it to the treatment of the poor in Sweden; but on the other hand, she described her indignation by witnessing a white woman beating her slaves, and stated that she was categorically opposed to all forms of slavery.

== Works ==
- Mathildas bekännelser eller Petreas första roman, letternovel, 1842, translated to German in 1848
- Erfarenhet och hugkomst ifrån sex år i de Förenta Staterna, travel book, 1860

== See also ==
- Rosalie Roos, another female Swedish traveller who lived in the Carolina states in the 1850s and wrote a travel book about her stay.
