= Oscar Montelius =

Swedish archaeologist

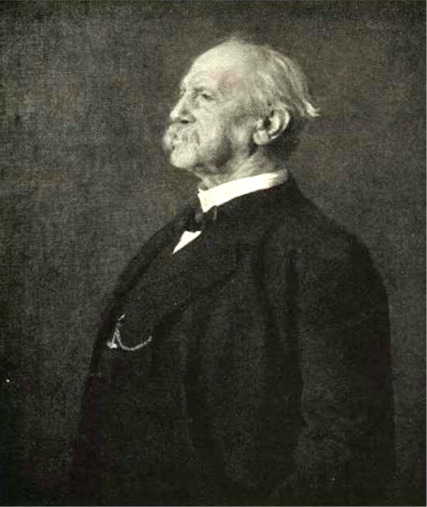
- Oscar Montelius, painted by Emerik Stenberg (Photo of painting from the Swedish periodical Ord & Bild 1913)
- Born: 9 September 1843; Stockholm
- Died: 4 November 1921 (aged 78); Stockholm
- Known for: seriation
- Awards: Pour le Mérite for Sciences and Arts (1898); Anders Retzius Medal (1913)
- Scientific career
- Fields: archaeology

Gustaf Oscar Augustin Montelius, known as Oscar Montelius (9 September 1843 – 4 November 1921) was a Swedish archaeologist who refined the concept of seriation, a relative chronological dating method.

== Biography ==
Oscar Montelius refined the concept of typology, a relative chronological dating method. Typology is the procedure of working out a chronology by arranging material remains of a cultural tradition in the order that produces the most consistent patterning of their cultural traits. Typologies are the basis for seriation, a technique developed by English Egyptologist Flinders Petrie (1853–1942) based on his excavations in Egypt.

Montelius' impetus was at first to provide relative dates for artifacts in museum collections that often lacked rigorous records, by making comparisons with other artifacts within a comparable geographical area. Montelius' method created a timeline specific to the location, based on material remains. Later, when combined with written historical references, objects could be provided absolute dates. He took the three-age system (Stone Age, Bronze Age, Iron Age), originally devised by Danish antiquarian Christian Jürgensen Thomsen (1788–1865) to organize Danish museum collections of archaeological materials, and sub-divided it further. He divided the Neolithic in Scandinavia into four numbered periods, I-IV, and the Nordic Bronze Age into six I-VI. He was the first to establish that the numerous Swedish petroglyphs were from the Nordic Bronze Age, by comparing axes portrayed in the petroglyphs with archaeological finds. Further he supported Thomsen's typology of gold bracteates from the migration period.

By taking calendrical dates from the recently deciphered hieroglyphics of Ancient Egypt, Montelius employed a complex system of cross-dating through typologies and associated finds to apply absolute dates to archaeological finds and features all over Europe. His diffusionist theories were eventually displaced by more complex views of cultural interaction but following refinement his system of sub-divisions is still effectively in use. Montelius was made a member of the Swedish Academy in 1917.

== Personal life ==
Oscar Montelius was married to Swedish philanthropist and feminist Agda Montelius née Reuterskiöld (1850–1920). They are buried in a dolmen grave (a type of grave that was common in Sweden during the Nordic Bronze Age) in Norra begravningsplatsen in Solna, Sweden.

== See also ==
- Hans Hildebrand

Cultural offices
| Preceded by Vitalis Norström | Swedish Academy, Seat No.18; 1917-1921 | Succeeded by Albert Engström |
