= Wendela Hebbe =

Swedish journalist and writer (1808–1899)

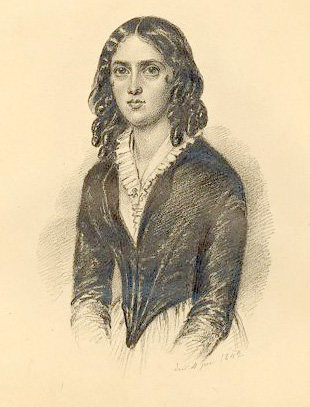
Wendela Hebbe, drawing by Maria Röhl 1842

Wendela Hebbe (née Åström; 9 September 1808 – 27 August 1899), was a Swedish journalist, writer, and salon hostess. She was arguably the first permanently employed female journalist at a Swedish newspaper. She had a significant place in the radical literary circles of mid 19th-century Sweden and was a controversial role model for the emancipated woman.

== Early life ==
Wendela Hebbe was born in Jönköping. She was the eldest of three daughters of the parish vicar Anders Samuel Åstrand and Maria Lund. Her father was interested in literature and culture and raised his daughters to enjoy the same things as he, and as a child, she was encouraged to read and explore music, art and literature. She was described as talented within music and literature and nicknamed "Fröken Frågvis" ("Miss Inquisitive"). Esaias Tegnér was an acquaintance of her father and a common guest in their home. Reportedly, he courted Wendela unsuccessfully from an early age and also after her marriage, and dedicated many of his poems to her. She refused him and offered him friendship, a line she upheld.

In 1832, she married the lawyer and writer Clemens Hebbe (1804-1893), with whom she had three daughters. In 1839, her spouse went bankrupt and fled the country: first to England, he eventually emigrated to the United States, and Wendela Hebbe was left to support herself and her daughters alone. She settled in Jönköping, and started to work in the only profession regarded socially acceptable for an educated woman at the time: she became a teacher and gave lessons in music, singing and drawing, which was only barely enough to support herself.

== Career as a journalist ==
In 1841, her first novel, Arabella, was published by Lars Johan Hierta, the chief editor of the radical newspaper Aftonbladet, and the same year, she was employed at Aftonbladet (she was given a permanent position in 1844).

Wendela Hebbe is generally referred to as the first female journalist in Sweden. Women wrote articles and edited papers in the Swedish press at least since Margareta Momma in 1738, most of whom unidentified as they wrote under anonymous pseudonyms, but Wendela Hebbe was likely the first woman reporter to be given a permanent position at a Swedish newspaper and was in that sense a pioneer of her profession: it was not until the 19th-century that the Swedish press employed permanent staff, and Wendela Hebbe is the first woman found in the staff register of any Swedish paper. She is listed in the staff register of Aftonbladet in between 1844 and 1851, followed by Marie Sophie Schwartz at Svenska Tidningen Dagligt Allehanda in 1851–1859.

Hebbe was made translator and editor of the culture section responsible for the coverage of culture, music and literature. She reviewed literature and novels, concerts, opera performances and theater plays, and managed the serials section. She is known to have used her section to promote debuting authors by publishing their novels as serials.

Outside of her cultural activity, she was also active as a social reporter, and was in fact likely to have been the first reporter in Sweden to introduce social reportage in Sweden. Wendela Hebbe shared the liberal and humanitarian views of Aftonbladet at the time. Because of her sex she was considered suitable for "soft questions" such as the social misery among the poor, and she gained considerable attention with her first social reportage Biskopens besök (Visit from the Bishop) in 1843, a piece which contributed to the social debate that had begun around class-differences in Sweden around this time. By her reportage of social injustice, she managed on several occasions to draw the attention to areas in need of reform and assist people in need of help.

== Literary career ==
Wendela Hebbe retired as a journalist in 1851 to focus on a career as a novelist. Her debut novel Arabella was a conventional love novel, but her later novels are written in a more realistic style. Her novels focus on the intrigue as such rather than at the characters, and are strongly associated with her own time. She included social critic as a message in her novels, and were reportedly inspired by Dickens and British 18th-century literature. Her novel Brudarne has been described as her most notable and referred to as the first "novel for girls" in Sweden. As a novelist, she has been regarded as talented but not original, and never had more than moderate success.

She was more successful as a writer of songs and poems for children and teenagers. Her children's poems were influenced by her own idyllic childhood in Småland and depicted children's games, children's rhymes and traditional folklore. Especially her fairy tales about animals was much admired by Bj Björnson and S H Grundtvig. Among her songs, the compositions Högt deruppe mellan fjällen (High up between the mountaintops) and Linnean (Linnea) became very popular.

Outside of her personal production, she made a valuable historical contribution by writing down old traditional folk lore stories and songs.

== Private life ==
Hebbe had a long-term relationship with Lars Johan Hierta. This was common knowledge and lead to caricatures in the press and rumors that she had been given her position as a result of nepotism. Hebbe and Hierta could not marry each other, as they were both married: her own marriage to her exiled spouse was not dissolved until 1864. Wendela Hebbe and Lars Johan Hierta had a son together, Edvard, in 1852. Even a woman as independent as Hebbe did not wish to acknowledge that she had an extramarital child. Edvard was born in secrecy during a trip to France: Hebbe never acknowledged him, but he was periodically a foster son of Hierta under an assumed name, and also visited Hebbe from time to time, until he was given a permanent home in Germany. Her son later became the father of the artist Mollie Faustman.

Wendela Hebbe was a central figure in the radical elite in Stockholm particularly during the 1840s and 1850s, and hosted a literary and musical salon which became a center for the liberal literary and artistic world, who gathered to recite, play music and discuss. To her circle of belonged Johan Jolin, Gunnar Olof Hyltén-Cavallius and also Magnus Jacob Crusenstolpe, whom she supported in his struggle for freedom of speech. A particular friendship was that of Carl Jonas Love Almquist, whose work as a writer she admired, as they shared an interest in social criticism. She also reportedly played an important part as an adviser and secretary in the creation of the compositions of Almquist, notably his Songes, according to her daughter Signe Hebbe, who remembered her mother and Almquist sitting by the piano during his compositions: "In the early 40s, when many of A[lmquist]:s songs were completed, Almqvist demonstrated by a finger on the musical keyboard what tone he desired. It was also H who with her beautiful warm voice presented the new creations to the circle of friends". Almqvist celebrated her with the piano composition »Vendelas mörka lockar» (the dark curls of Vendela). According to Signe Hebbe, her mother and Almqvist never had a romantic relationship, but remaining correspondence and behavior of Almqvist suggest that they were very likely more than friends Wendela Hebbe demonstrated her loyal support for Carl Jonas Love Almquist during the scandal of 1851.

Her salon was an important part of Stockholm literary life and was regarded as a vital destination for a writer visiting Stockholm: Johan Ludvig Runeberg did so during his short visit in 1851. Her home continued to be a meeting place for decades, even after an illness left her unable to walk in 1878, and she was later to be acquainted with Ellen Key and Herman Sätherberg, whose poems she composed music to. She also accompanied her daughter, the famous opera singer Signe Hebbe, on her European tours.

Wendela Hebbe was never to be famed as writer, but she played a great part as a salon hostess, and though she was herself never involved in the work for women's emancipation, she was an early role model for the emancipated woman through her independent and controversial lifestyle. Gösta Lundström said of her:

"As a writer alone, Hebbe can not be given a prominent place in our history. But as a gathering and inspiring force in the cultural life of 19th-century Sweden she is well worth remembering. Also as one of the earliest representatives of women's emancipation in our nation, she defends her place as one of the most noted Swedish women of her century. Though she in many aspects illustrated the "soulful" women's ideal of the romantic era, she balanced this with her intelligence and clearheaded realism."

The writer and journalist Jane Gernandt-Claine described her:

"Around her entire ethereal being there was an indescribable air of spiritual refinement, this nobility of the soul, which belongs to the most admirable things in life. You never truly got close to her and never really wanted to, you were only too happy to be at a distance from so much soulful nobility within this fragile and refined shell.

Wendela Hebbe was much courted by contemporary male artists but is described as without vanity. She commented about herself and her life that she was born "with much longing and much frustration".

Hebbe died in Stockholm.

== Legacy ==
In 1983 the association Friends of Wendela Hebbe (Swedish: Wendelas Vänner) was founded to preserve the memory of Wendela Hebbe. The association preserves her summer house in Södertälje, which was given to her by Hierta in 1863, and made it a museum.

The gymnasium Wendela Hebbegymnasiet in Södertälje is named after her.

== Works ==
- Arabella (novel, 1841)
- Svenska skaldestycken för ungdom (book of poems "for young people", 1845)
- Arbetkarlens hustru (The wife of a working man) (reportage, 1846)
- Brudarne (The Brides) (novel, 1846). Her most famous work.
- En fattig familj (A poor family) (reportage, 1850)
- Tvillingbrodern (The twin brother) (novel, 1851)
- Lycksökarna (The fortune hunters) (novel, 1852)
- Dalkullan (play, 1858)
- I Skogen (In the woods) (children's book, 1871)
- Bland trollen (Among the ogres) (children's book, 1877)
- Under hängranarne (Under the hanging trees) (novel, 1877)

== See also ==
- Catharina Ahlgren
- Louise Flodin
- Maria Cederschiöld
