= Ellen Anckarsvärd =

Swedish activist (1833–1898)

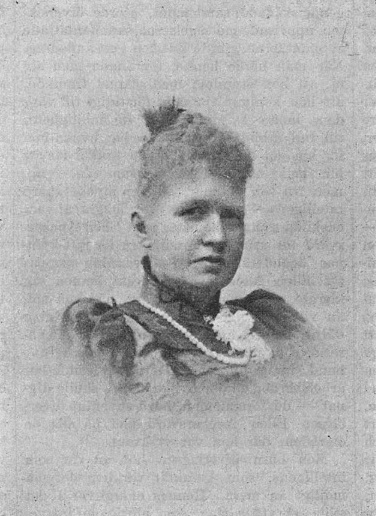
- Born: 10 December 1833; The Royal Court Parish
- Died: 12 August 1898 (aged 64); Klara Church Parish
- Resting place: Norra begravningsplatsen
- Spouse(s): Theodor Anckarsvärd
- Children: Cossva Anckarsvärd
- Relatives: Axel Fredrik Nyström

Anna Lovisa Eleonora "Ellen" Anckarsvärd (née Nyström; 10 December 1833 – 8 December 1898) was a Swedish women's rights activist. She was the co-founder and secretary of the Married Woman's Property Rights Association (1873), co-founder and vice chairperson of the Friends of Handicraft (1874), co-founder of Fredrika Bremer Association (1884), vice chairperson of the Fredrika Bremer Association in 1896–1898, chairperson of the National Council of Swedish Women in 1896–1898, and chairperson of the Läsesalongen in 1896–1898.

== Life ==
Ellen Anckarsvärd was the daughter of the architect Per Axel Nyström. In 1862, she married the architect Theodor Anckarsvärd (1816–1878). She became the mother of the diplomat Cossva Anckarsvärd, later secretary of the foreign ministry, and the foster mother of the artist Louis Sparre.

Ellen Anckarsvärd was to become one of the most notable figures in the first generation of the organized women's movement in Sweden. In 1873, she and Anna Hierta-Retzius took the initiative to establish the Married Woman's Property Rights Association, which was the first women's rights organization in Sweden. She functioned as its secretary for many years. According to Anna Hierta-Retzius, Anckarsvärd was the leading figure of the organisation with her intellect and efficiency.

In 1874, she co-founded Friends of Handicrafts, served in the economic board of the organization and then as its Vice Chairperson. In 1874–1896, she served as member of the board of the literary society Läsesalongen (Reading Parlor), and from 1896 as its chairperson.

In 1884, she was one of the co-founders of the Fredrika Bremer Association, the main women's rights organization in the 19th century. According to Ellen Key, Anckarsvärd was a good organizer, for which no juridical or practical problem was to difficult to solve, and she served as the juridical adviser of the organization. She has been referred to as the successor of Sophie Adlersparre within the Swedish bourgeoisie women's movement. She had a close companionship with Adlersparre, of which it was once said: "It is Mrs Adlersparre who give birth to ideas, but it is Mrs Anckarsvärd who raise them!"

From 1896 to 1898, she served as Chairperson of the National Council of Swedish Women, which became a part of International Council of Women in 1898. She hosted the Congress of Nordic Women which was arranged by the organization in 1897. She served as Chairperson of the Women's Committee of the Chicago Exhibition, and member of the Klara Parish charitable society, the Deaconesses institution and the board of Idun magazine.

Ellen Key describe her as a frail blonde with a delicate constitution and a calm temperament, reserved and humble, but with an astonishing intelligence and will force, and an ability to focus on the matter at hand. She was a central figure in the organizations she participated in through her efficiency as an organizer and administrator. In the memorial article of her in Idun, Ellen Key described her:

"Very blonde, pale and fragile, a diminutive delicate creature, not only weak, but also sickly- such was the surface of the woman, within whose frail physique harbored the most masculine talent I have ever encountered within a member of the female sex. [..] I have never sen any woman focus to entirely upon a question without being consumed by it. [..] A common friend – now Mrs von Vollmar, herself a sharp intelligence – once, after one of our meetings with Ellen Anckarsvärd in the Married Woman's Property Rights Association, truthfully exclaimed that Ellen Anckarsvärd estimated and responded better within these subjects asleep than us others while awake! When one make the addition, that within this frail creature, who one dared hardly touch when shaking hands, was a strength, who could carry an amount of assignments with a smile when others would have given up – then one will understand, how superior Ellen Anckarsvärd became within those areas where she was active."

== Sources ==
- Österberg, Carin et al., Svenska kvinnor: föregångare, nyskapare (Swedish women: Predecessors, pioneers) Lund: Signum 1990. (ISBN 91-87896-03-6)
- Idun, Nr. 50, 1898
