= Rosalie Olivecrona =

Swedish feminist activist and writer

Rosalie Roos
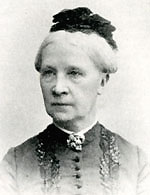
- Born: December 9, 1823
- Died: June 4, 1898 (aged 74); Stockholm
- Other names: Rosalie Olivecrona
- Occupations: Feminist, publisher, editor and writer
- Known for: Co-founded the Swedish Red Cross (1865)
- Spouse: Samuel Detlof Rudolf Knut Olivecrona

Rosalie Ulrika Olivecrona (née Roos; December 9, 1823 – June 4, 1898) was a Swedish feminist and writer. She is one of the three great pioneers of the organized women's rights movement in Sweden, alongside Fredrika Bremer and Sophie Adlersparre.

== Biography ==
Rosalie Ulrika Roos was born into a wealthy family. She grew up in Stockholm and was among the first students at the Wallinska flickskolan in Stockholm, one of the oldest girls' school in Sweden dating to 1831. The family moved in 1839 to Sjogeris at the foot of the mountainous plateau, Mösseberg in Västergötland.

One of her friends, Hulda Hahr, was a teacher at a girls' school in Limestone, a town near Charleston, South Carolina, United States, and offered her a position at the school. She traveled to the United States in 1851, and stayed there for four years. Roos was first a teacher of French at the school in Limestone, then she became a governess at the plantation of two of her students, Eliza and Annie Peronneau. She later wrote a description of her stay and of the culture of the American South. She did not notice any abuse of the slaves herself, but she considered slavery to be unnatural and "emotionally disgusting," and was convinced that its abolition was unavoidable, though it would meet with much resistance. She returned to Sweden in 1855.

In 1859, she founded the paper Tidskrift för hemmet ("Journal for the Home") in companionship with her friend Sophie Adlersparre with financial support of Fredrika Limnell. The paper was a feminist publication, which argued for women's rights, particularly the right to higher education and profession. They wrote many of the articles themselves. It was published in Stockholm from 1859 to 1885.

In 1861, Roos and Adlersparre made a journey through Germany, France, England, Scotland and Ireland to compare the difference within the feminist movements, and reported that the movement was little known in Germany and France in comparison to Great Britain.

In 1864, she took part in the founding of Svenska Röda Korset (Swedish Red Cross) with Adlersparre, General Major Rudebeck, and Dr. Lemchen.

== Personal life ==
In 1857 she married a widower, Swedish lawyer, statesman and professor, Knut Olivecrona (1817–1905). Olivecrona was professor of law at Uppsala University (1852–1867) and Rector of Uppsala University (1861–1862). He was Supreme Court Justice (1868–1889) and became a member of the International Court of Justice at The Hague from 1902.

Roos moved to Uppsala and became stepmother to her husband's son and three daughters. Their marriage also produced a daughter and a son.

== Works ==
- Resa till Amerika ('A Journey to the Americas') travel book, 1851–55
- Mary Carpenter 1887
- Spridda blad ('Scattered leaves') poem, 1889

== See also ==
- Lovisa Mathilda Nettelbladt, another female Swedish traveller who lived in the Carolina states in the 1850s and wrote a travel book about her stay.

== Other sources ==
- Ulf Beijbom (in Swedish) : Utvandrarkvinnor. Svenska kvinnoöden i Amerika (Women Emigrants. Destinys of Swedish women in America) (2006)
- Österberg, Carin, Lewenhaupt, Inga & Wahlberg, Anna Greta, Svenska kvinnor: föregångare nyskapare, Signum, Lund, 1990 (1990)
- Dagny nr 11 1898
- Tidskrift för hemmet nr 4 1861
