= Fredrika Bremer Association =

Women's rights organisation in Sweden

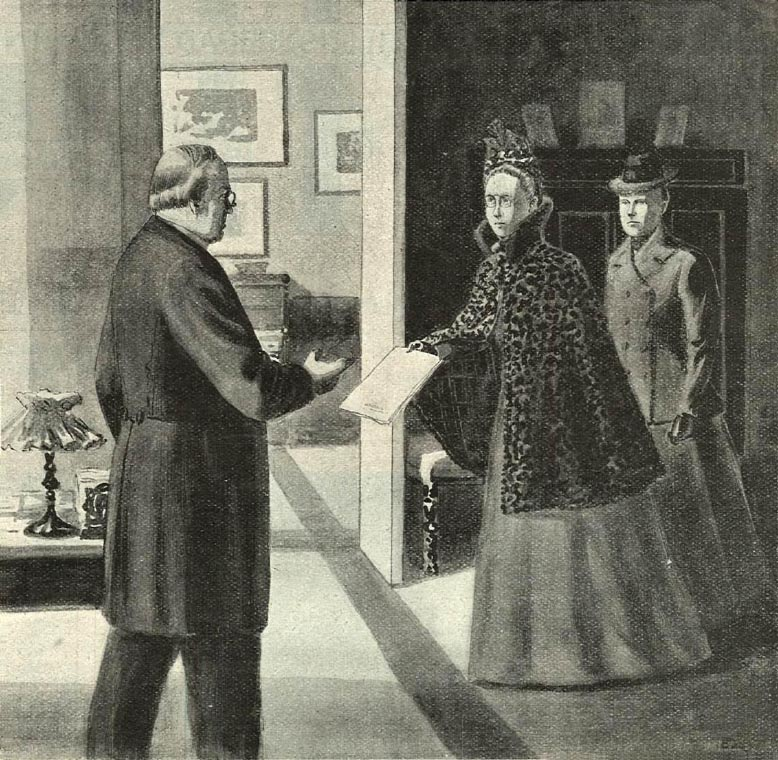
Agda Montelius and Gertrud Adelborg presents the petition for women’s suffrage to prime minister Erik Gustaf Boström in 1899.

The Fredrika Bremer Association (Swedish: Fredrika Bremer Förbundet, abbreviated FBF) is the oldest women's rights organisation in Sweden. The association stands for an inclusive, intersectional and progressive liberal feminism, and advocates for women's rights and LGBT rights.

It is traditionally the foremost organisation of the bourgeois-liberal women's movement in Sweden. It has always been open to both women and men. It is a member of the International Alliance of Women, and is a sister association of the Danish Women's Society, the Norwegian Association for Women's Rights and the Icelandic Women's Rights Association.

== Activity ==
The FBF works with forming public opinion in favor of gender equality by information and activities, and by handing out money from various funds and scholarships. It collaborates with other organisations with similar goals both nationally and internationally. The FBF had a representative in the governmental council of equality.

It is a member of the International Alliance of Women, which has general consultative status with the United Nations ECOSOC. It was also a member of the Joint Organization of Nordic Women's Rights Associations.

== History ==
The organisation was founded in 1884 by a group largely consisting of the board of the women's magazine Home Review. It consisted of the feminist Sophie Adlersparre, Ellen Anckarsvärd, Fredrika Limnell, Ellen Fries, Hans Hildebrand and G. Sjöberg. It was named in honor of the Swedish novelist Fredrika Bremer, whose novel Hertha was responsible for the legislation emancipating unmarried women from wardship of their male relatives. It also led to the foundation of Gothenburg's Women's Association in Sweden's second city of Gothenburg, which was founded as a local answer to the FBF.

The purpose of the organisation was to support women's rights, to inform women of their rights and to encourage them to use them. At the time of its foundation, for example, the focus was to inform women of their rights to serve in the boards of public institutions, and of the rights of women of a certain income to vote in municipal elections and to use those rights. By 1890, the office of the organisation in Stockholm functioned as an employment agency for women of the middle classes, and offered juridical, economic and medical information and advice to women. It was also noted at that time that many women came there to be informed of the movement for women suffrage. In 1899, a delegation from the FBF presented a suggestion of woman suffrage to prime minister Erik Gustaf Boström. The delegation was headed by Agda Montelius, accompanied by Gertrud Adelborg, who had written the demand. This was the first time the Swedish women's movement themselves had officially presented a demand for suffrage.

In 1890, the Svenska drägtreformföreningen became a part of the FBA, and in 1896, the Married Woman Property Association was merged in the association. In 1934, Ida von Plomgren, a longterm employee and member fronted a publicity film about the FBF, narrating how far the fight for women's rights had come and sharing some of the organisation's areas of activity. It was scripted by Margareta von Konow. This included a visit to the FBF office at Klarabergsgatan 48, where Plomgren joked that her door sign should read ‘Ask me about everything - because that's what the Swedish people do’.

In 1937, the FBF founded the Kommittén för ökad kvinnorepresentation (Literary: 'The committee for increased women's representation') to lobby for more women in political office and particularly more women in parliament.

== Publications ==
The FBF published the women's magazine Dagny, which succeeded Adlersparre's Home Review in 1886. This publication was renamed Hertha in 1914 and was the oldest women's magazine in the world when it was discontinued in 1999 (it was revived in 2001).

== Presidents ==
- 1884–1903: Hans Hildebrand
- 1903–1920: Agda Montelius
- 1920–1937: Lizinka Dyrssen
- 1937–1949: Hanna Rydh
- 1949–1958: Elsa Ewerlöf
- 1958–1959: Elin Lauritzen
- 1959–1961: Inger Leijonhufvud
- 1961–1967: Anna-Greta Hybbinette
- 1967–1970: Astrid Schönberg
- 1970–1976: Karin Ahrland
- 1976–1982: Birgitta Wistrand
- 1982–1985: Monica Påhlsson
- 1985–1989: Gerd Forssell
- 1989–1990: Ann Egefalk
- 1990–1991: Eivor Lilja
- 1991–1997: Inge Garstedt
- 1997–2000: Anna-Karin Sjöstrand
- 2000–2004: Irene Rundberg
- 2004–2008: Ann Falkinger
- 2008–2013: Birgitta Wistrand
- 2013–2018: Louise Lindfors
- 2018–2019: Ulrika Kärnborg (Christina Knight, acting)
- 2020–: Camilla Wagner
