= Lars Johan Hierta =

Newspaper publisher, social critic, businessman and politician

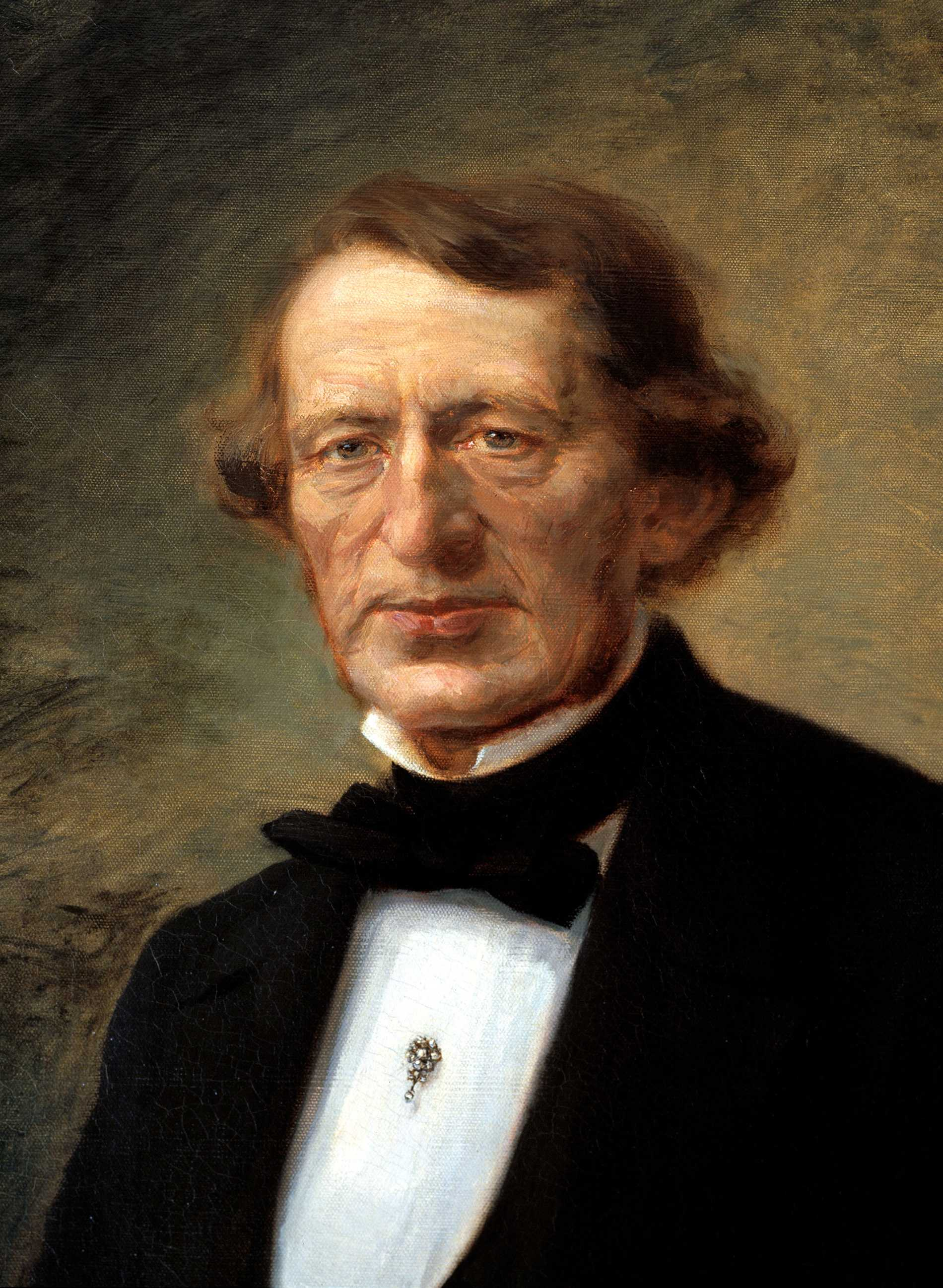
- Lars Johan Hierta
- Born: 22 January 1801; Uppsala, Sweden
- Died: 20 November 1872 (aged 71); Stockholm, Sweden
- Resting place: Norra begravningsplatsen
- Education: Uppsala University
- Occupations: Newspaper publisher, social critic, businessman, politician
- Known for: Founding the newspaper Aftonbladet
- Title: President of the Riksdag of the Estates; President of Andra kammaren
- Spouse: Wilhelmina Fröding (m. 1833)
- Children: 5, including: Ebba Lind af Hageby (born 1840); Anna Hierta-Retzius (born 1841); Edvard Faustman (born 1852)

Lars Johan Hierta (Swedish: [lɑːʂˈjûːan ˈjæ̂ʈːa]; 22 January 1801 – 20 November 1872) was a Swedish newspaper publisher, social critic, businessman and politician. He is best known as the founder of the newspaper Aftonbladet in 1830. Hierta was a leading agitator for political and social reform in Sweden during the 19th century. He is sometimes credited as the "father of the free press" in Sweden.

== Biography ==
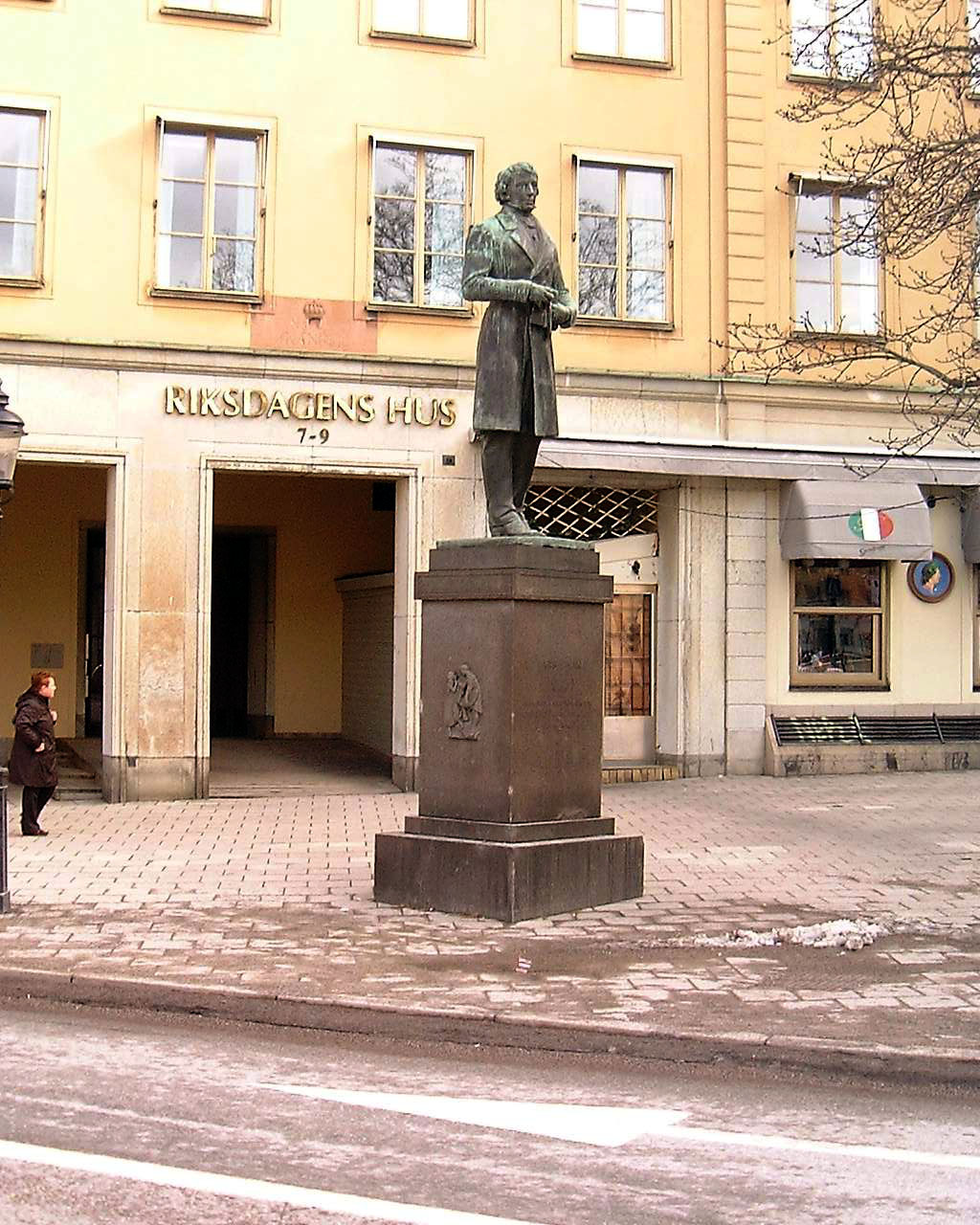
Statue of Lars Johan Hierta at Riddarhustorget in Gamla stan, Stockholm

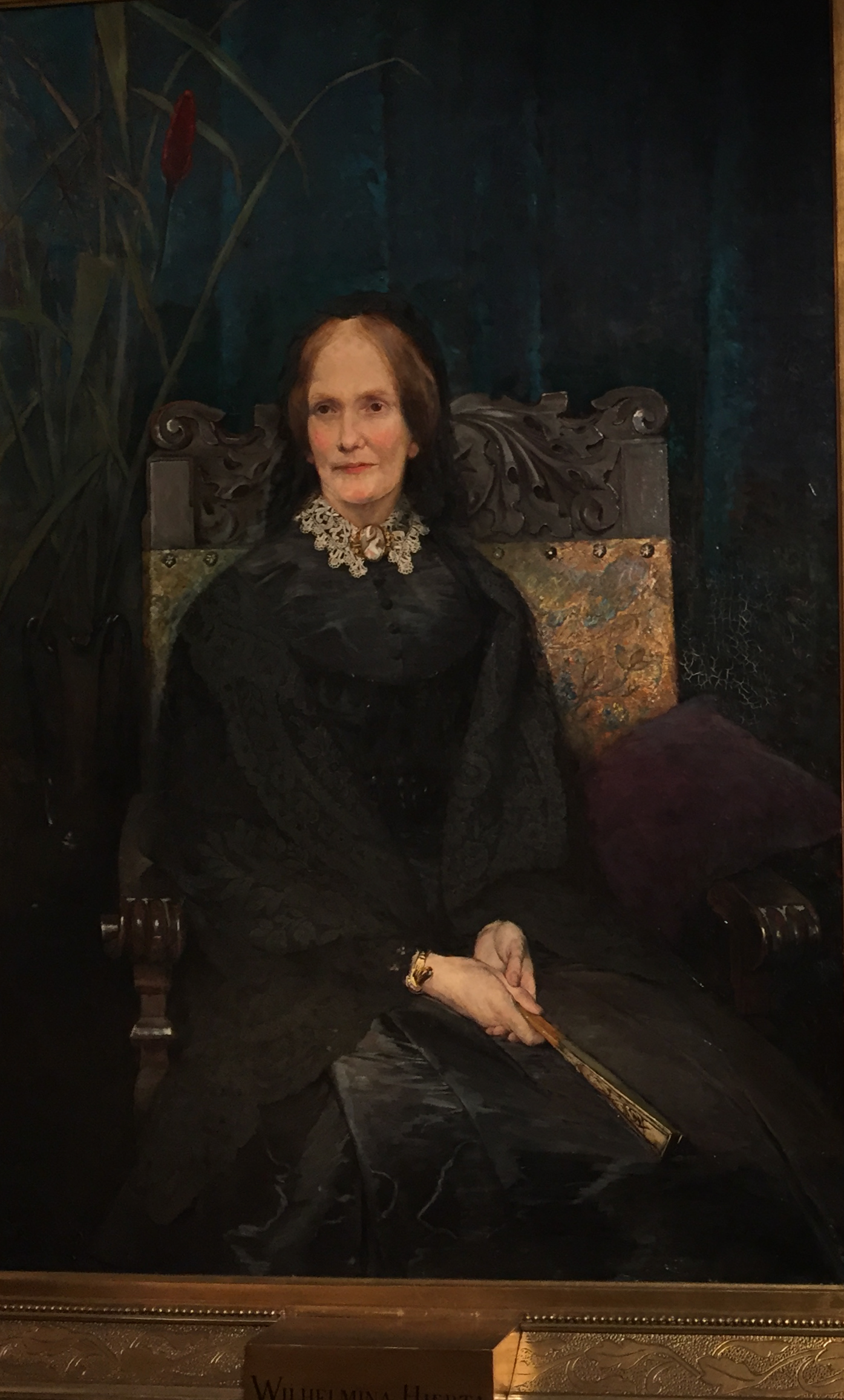
Wilhelmina Fröding Hierta (1805–1878)

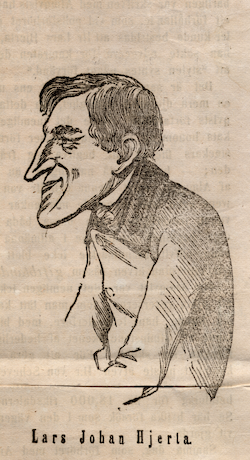
1851 caricature of Hierta in Folkets Röst

Hierta was born to a noble family – the Hierta family – in Uppsala, Sweden, as the son of Carl Didrik Hierta and Hedvig Johanna Schméer. He received his primary education at a private school and began his studies at Uppsala University in 1814, where he earned a Doctor of Philosophy and a Candidate of Law in 1821. In the same year, he was employed as an unpaid trainee at the central government agency Bergskollegium, where he was promoted as a law clerk in 1825.

In the mid-1820s, Hierta met Wilhelmina Fröding, his future wife. Although her family rejected his initial marriage proposal, they married in 1833 and together had five daughters.

At the Riksdag of the Estates of 1823, Hierta served as a secretary at the Swedish House of Lords. At the following Estates Assembly, from 1828 to 1830, he was a representative of the nobility and also served as a law clerk. In the Riksdag, Hierta aligned himself with the liberal opposition critical of the conservative rule of King Charles XIV John.

Hierta started writing for Conservationsbladet in 1823. He also wrote for the papers Argus from 1824 to 1826 and, sporadically, Stockholmsposten from 1826 to 1828. He started writing as a humourist, later as a news writer and political editorialist.

In 1829, Hierta started the book publishing house Hiertas bokförlag ("Hierta's Publishing House").

In 1830, Hierta founded the Aftonbladet newspaper, where he advocated for a republic (though without using the word "republic"), which is sometimes seen as the start of the Swedish republican movement. The newspaper was banned many times, but published under a new name each time.

In 1839 Lars Johan Hierta founded a candle factory still active today by the name of Liljeholmens Stearinfabriks AB.

Soon after 1840, Aftonbladet hired Swedish writer and feminist Wendela Hebbe (1808–1899), who became the first permanently-employed woman journalist at a Swedish newspaper. Hierta and Hebbe later had a son together. Both Hierta and Hebbe were socially active for liberal causes.

At the time of his death in Stockholm, Hierta was one of the wealthiest persons in Sweden. After his death, his widow Wilhelmina Fröding Hierta donated 100,000 SEK to Stockholm University for the establishment of a professorship in economics, and later 400,000 SEK to the foundation Lars Hiertas minne ("Lars Hierta's Memory") whose mission was to "work freely and independently for human progress" (fritt och oberoende verka för det mänskliga framåtskridandet). He is buried in Norra begravningsplatsen.
