= Married Woman's Property Rights Association =

Swedish women's rights organisation

The Married Woman Property Association (Swedish: Föreningen för gift kvinnas äganderätt) was a Swedish women's rights organisation active in Sweden between 1873 and 1896. Its purpose was to work for the introduction of reformed laws in favor of women's equality with men. The association was founded with the goal to reform the marriage laws regarding the guardianship of men over their wife, and to make it possible for married women to handle their own economy. However, despite the name, they also worked for legal reform in other issues within women's rights. It is regarded as the first women's rights organisation in Sweden.

== History ==
The association was co-founded by Anna Hierta-Retzius and Ellen Anckarsvärd in 1873, while it was formally headed by the male parliamentarian Gustaf Fridolf Amlquist. The association is regarded to have been foremost an association for women of the upper classes and male liberal intellectuals. Among their members were Amanda Kerfstedt and Ellen Key.

The association worked to affect public opinion in order to introduce legal reform regarding gender equality. Its first purpose, which gave the association its name, was to give married women control over their own property. This was a controversial subject: married women were legally minors under the guardianship of their husbands, and thus had not control over their own property, unless there had been a prenuptial agreement. What the association actually wished to achieve was, therefore, to abolish the guardianship of a husband over his wife. In 1874, a legal reform introduced the right for a professional married woman to control the money she earned after marriage. In 1884, a new reform allowed married women control over their inheritance and property. The same year, a reform declared unmarried women of legal majority at the same age as men: 21. However, these victories were not complete, as the guardianship of husband's over their wives were kept.

The association worked for many other issues regarding reform in women's rights except for their main issue. During the 1880s, they had a campaign to increase the participation of women voters in the elections: since 1862, women of legal majority (unmarried, divorced and widowed women) had the right to participate in municipal elections if they met the property qualifications, and the association encouraged them to use this right: in the 1887 municipal election, the female voters participation consisted of 10-15 percent.

In 1896, the association was absorbed by the Fredrika-Bremer-Förbundet and dissolved.
