= Ellen Fries =

Swedish writer

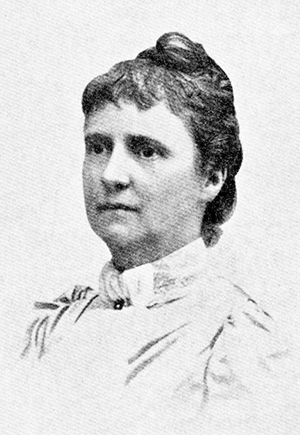
- Born: 23 September 1855; Törnsfalls community
- Died: 31 March 1900; City of Stockholm
- Resting place: Norra begravningsplatsen
- Education: Uppsala University
- Occupations: Historian, writer, teacher, collector
- Employers: Lyceum för flickor (1883–1884); Wallinska skolan (1875–1877); Åhlinska skolan (1885–1899)

Ellen Fries (23 September 1855 – 31 March 1900) was a Swedish feminist and writer. She became the first female Ph.D. in Sweden in 1883. She also founded several women's organizations.

== Biography ==
She born in 1855 at Rödslegård in Törnsfall, Kalmar County, to Colonel Patrik Constantin Fries and Beata Maria Borgström. She studied at the Åhlinska flickskolan, and graduated with a professional degree from Wallinska skolan in Stockholm 19 May 1874. She studied language and art by travelling to Paris and Leipzig and was a language teacher at Wallinska skolan in 1875–1877. The universities in Sweden had been opened to both genders in 1870. Fries enlisted as a student at Uppsala University 12 October 1877. She studied history, Nordic language and political science and was given the scholarship Kraemerska stipendiet. She became the first female Ph.D. in Sweden 31 May 1883. She was a teacher in history at Wallinska skolan in Stockholm 1884–1886 and at Åhlinska flickskolan from 1885; in 1890, she became its principal.

In 1884, she was one of six to summon the first meeting of the feminist movement the Fredrika Bremer Association; she initiated the foundation of the National Council of Swedish Women (Svenska kvinnors nationalförbund) in 1896, and one of the five co-founders of the Nya Idun society.

From 1881, she was active in the feminist paper of Sophie Adlersparre, Tidskrift för hemmet, mainly contributing with biographies of women, and she was also joint editor of the paper in 1883–1885. She contributed with articles as a freelancer to various papers, such as Dagny 1886–1895, Framåt 1886, Verdandi 1888, Hemåt 1892, Nya Idun 1891–1892, Stockholms Dagblad 1884–1885 and Aftonbladet 1885 as well as in the dictionary Nordisk Familjebok.

In 1886 and 1899–1900, she lectured on the 17th and 18th centuries at Pedagogiska lärokursen in Stockholm.

Fries died in Stockholm in 1900.

== Works ==
- Märkvärdiga qvinnor, 2 vol. (1890–1891)
- Sverges sista häxprocess i Dalarne 1757–1763 (1893)
- Den svenska odlingens stormän. Lefnadsteckningar för skola och hem. (1896–)
- Teckningar ur svenska adelns familjelif i gamla tider (part 1, 1895)

Part two was published after her death by her father:

- Teckningar ur svenska adelns familjelif i gamla tider (part 2, 1900)
- Svenska kvinnor (1920)
- "Om samskolor", Dagny no. 2 (1892)
- "Kvinnan och försvaret", Dagny no. 8 (1892)
- "Flickskolemötet i Lund sommaren 1893" Dagny, no. 6 (1893)
- "Några blad ur svenska kvinnans historia under sjuttonhundratalet" Dagny no. 4–5 (1895)
- Kvinnliga elementärundervisningen i Frankrike (travelogue, 1885)

== See also ==
Hildegard Björck
