= Hans Hildebrand =

Swedish archeologist

Hans Olof Hildebrand
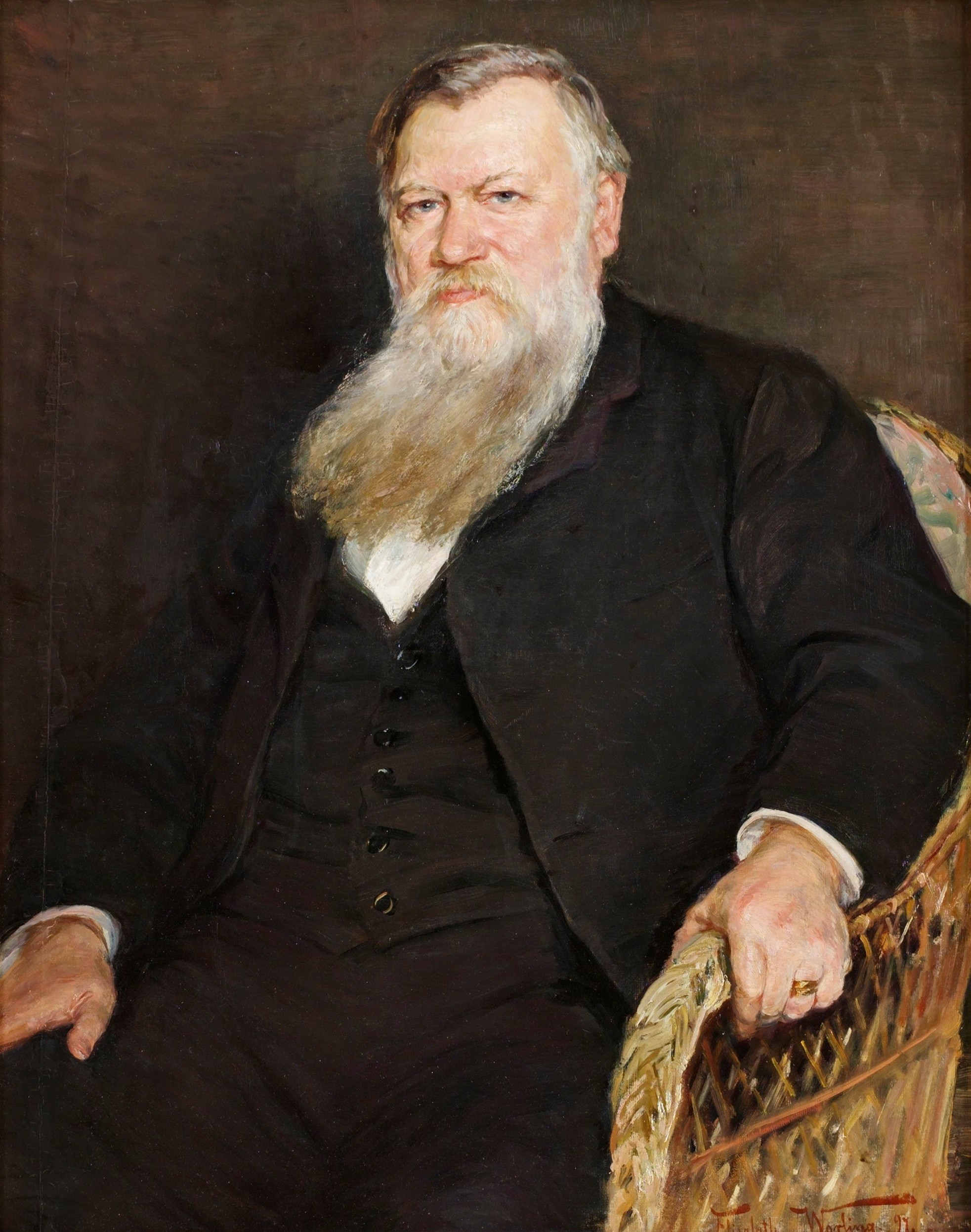
- Born: 5 April 1842; Stockholm, Sweden
- Died: 2 February 1913 (aged 70); Stockholm, Sweden
- Occupation: archeologist

Member of the Swedish Academy (Seat No. 6)
- In office 20 December 1895 – 2 February 1913
- Preceded by: Fredrik August Dahlgren
- Succeeded by: Sven Hedin

Permanent Secretary of the Swedish Academy (pro temporare)
- In office June 1912 – February 1913
- Preceded by: Carl David af Wirsén
- Succeeded by: Erik Axel Karlfeldt

Hans Olof Hildebrand Hildebrand (5 April 1842 – 2 February 1913) was a Swedish archeologist. He is internationally known as one of the pioneers of the archaeological technique of typology.

== Biography ==
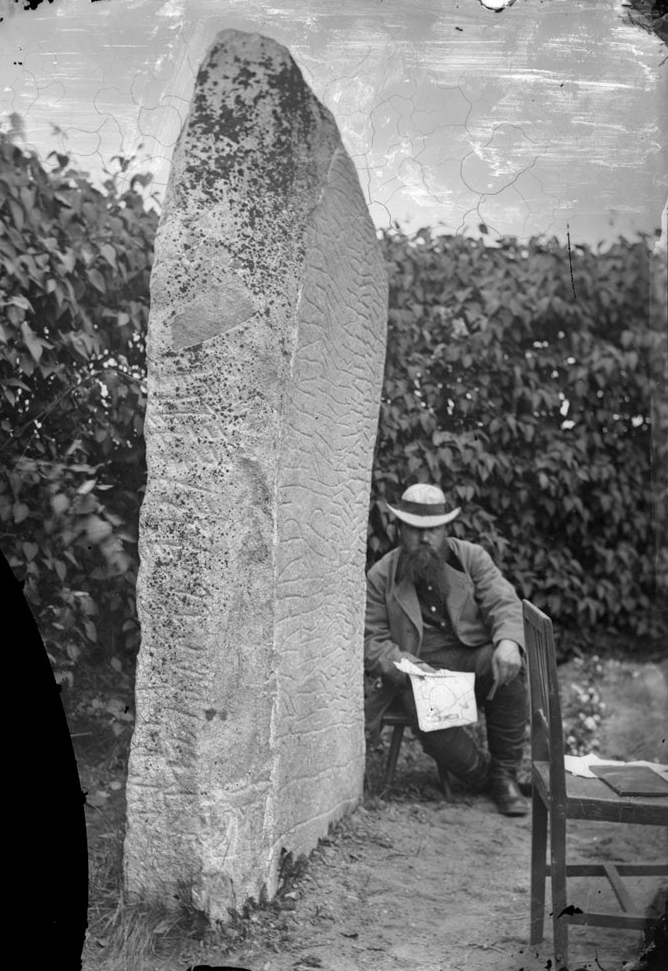
Hans Hildebrand sitting by the Rök runestone

Born in Stockholm, he was the son of Bror Emil Hildebrand and Anna Mathilda Ekecrantz. He was the brother of historian Emil Hildebrand (1848–1919). Hildebrand became a student in Uppsala University in 1860, graduated with a bachelor's degree in philosophy in 1865 and was promoted the following year to a doctor of philosophy. During the years 1870–1871, he made a trip abroad under a travel scholarship.

Hildebrand, along with his father and his colleague Oscar Montelius (1843–1921), is considered to have been one of the fathers of Swedish archaeology. He worked both in archaeology and numismatics, mainly of the High and Late Middle Ages.

Between 1895 and 1913, Hildebrand was Director-General of the Swedish Academy. From 1879 to 1907 he was also Secretary to the Royal Swedish Academy of Letters, History and Antiquities and Custodian of the Swedish National Heritage Board (Riksantikvarieämbetet). Whilst at the Academy of Letters he contributed to the foundation of the journal Fornvännen. He was a member of the Royal Swedish Academy of Sciences from 1891. He gave the Rhind Lectures in 1896, on "Industrial arts of Scandinavia in pagan times".

== Personal life ==
He married Elin Maria Charlotta Martin in 1867. He was the father of historian Karl Hildebrand (1870–1952) and philanthropist Hedvig Elisabeth Carlander (1875–1961).

Cultural offices
Preceded by Fredrik August Dahlgren	Swedish Academy, Seat No 6; 1895-1913	Succeeded by Sven Hedin
