= Elisabeth Krey-Lange =

Swedish Journalist and Women's Rights Activist

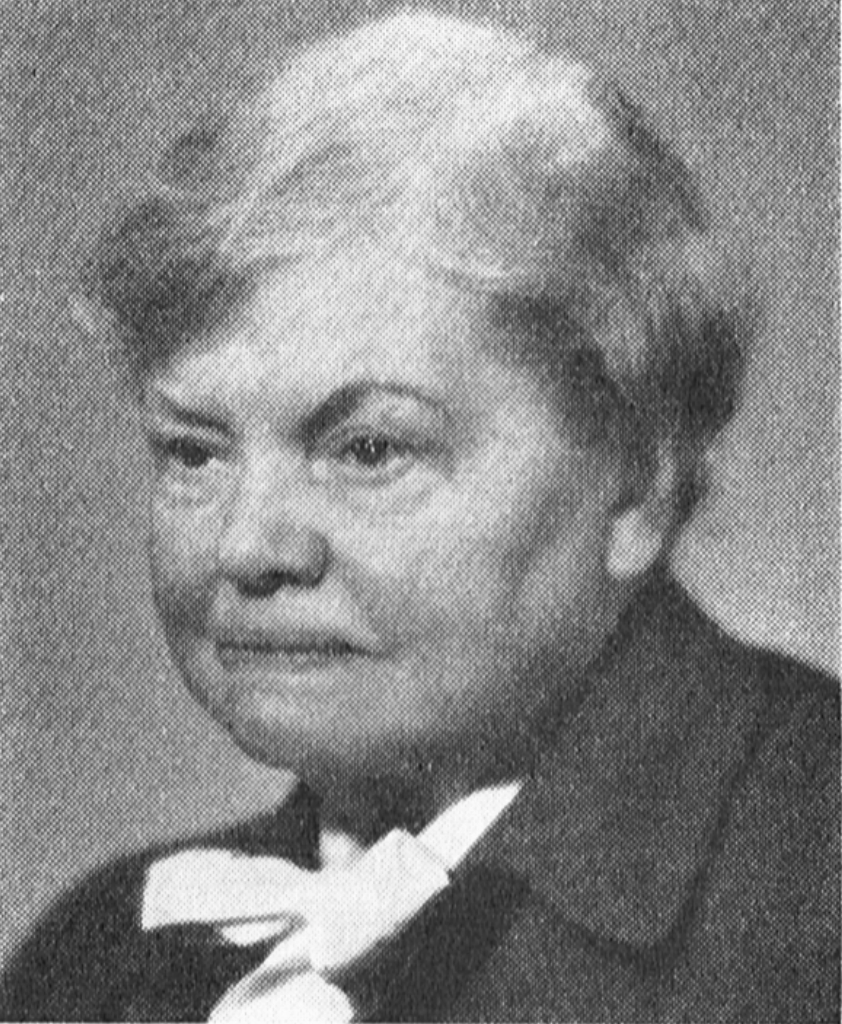
Elisabeth Krey-Lange

Elisabeth Johanna Lovisa Krey-Lange (1878–1965) was a Swedish journalist and women's rights activist. As a journalist, she contributed to the newspapers Stockholms Dagblad and Svenska Dagbladet and to the women's periodical Idun. Krey-Lange took a special interest in the woman's movement. She was a member of the Swedish Association for Women's Suffrage (LKPR) and the first editor the organization's journal Rösträtt för kvinnor. In 1911, she was a reporter at the Sixth Conference of the International Woman Suffrage Alliance in Stockholm. Some reports indicate she was one the Swedish delegates at the 1915 International Congress of Women in the Hague. After the end of World War I, Krey-Lange was an active member of Save the Children, attending a 1920 meeting in Geneva and participating in the distribution of food and clothing in Vienna. In the 1930s, she was international press ombudsman for the Women's International League for Peace and Freedom.

== Early life, education and family ==
Born in Norrköping on 16 November 1878, Elisabeth Johanna Lovisa Krey was the only daughter of the engineer Erik Gustaf Krey, who worked in the local sugar factory, and his wife Minna Sofia Wilhelmina née Landström. After attending the girls' school in Norrköping, in 1900 she matriculated from the Wallin School in Copenhagen. After periods at the Sorbonne in Paris and at the University of Oxford, she returned to Sweden where she earned a bachelor's degree in languages from Uppsala University in 1904. She married twice, first in 1917 to the physician Einer Lange who died of influenza the following year. In 1935, she married the engineer Carl Hjalmar Halldin who died in 1957.

== Career ==
On graduation. until 1908 Krey worked as a teacher in Ronneby and Norrköping. When the family moved to Stockholm, she began to work as a journalist for Stockholms Dagblad, establishing friendships with other women journalists including Ellen Rydelius, Elin Wägner and Else Kleen. She translated items from the foreign press, reported on local events and wrote articles about suffrage meetings, the problems faced by women and children and employment conditions for women workers.

In early 1911, she moved to Svenska Dagbladet. A member of the suffrage association LKPR, in 1912 she became the first editor of the organization's journal Rösträtt för kvinnor (Suffrage for Women). She resigned as editor a year later but continued to contribute articles on foreign literature. In 1912, she became the only woman to join the journalists' union Svenska Journalistföreningen. In 1914, before the beginning of World War I, Krey spent six months in the United States, furthering her education while continuing to contribute articles to Svenska Dagbladet from Washington and Chicago.

In 1911, Krey had been present as a reporter at the Sixth Conference of the International Woman Suffrage Alliance in Stockholm. Some reports indicate that in 1915, she was one the Swedes at the International Congress of Women in the Hague. Krey-Lange was an active member of Save the Children, attending a 1920 meeting in Geneva and participating in the distribution of food and clothing in Vienna. In the 1930s, she was the international press officer for the Women's International League for Peace and Freedom. She was the publisher and editor of the nursing journal Tidskrift för Sveriges sjuksköterskor from 1935 to 1950.

Elisabeth Krey-Lange died in Stockholm on 6 July 1965.
