= Wadström =

Wadström is a Swedish surname. Notable people with the surname include:

- Carl Bernhard Wadström (1746–1799), Swedish assessor, economist, writer, painter and abolitionist
- Ellen Hagen (née Wadström; 1873–1967), Swedish women's rights activist and politician
- Frida Stéenhoff (née Wadström; 1865–1945), Swedish women's rights activist and writer
- Petra Wadström (born 1952), Swedish inventor

== See also ==
- Wadstrom, an unincorporated community of Ventura County, California, United States
