= Asta Ekenvall =

Swedish librarian (1913–2001)

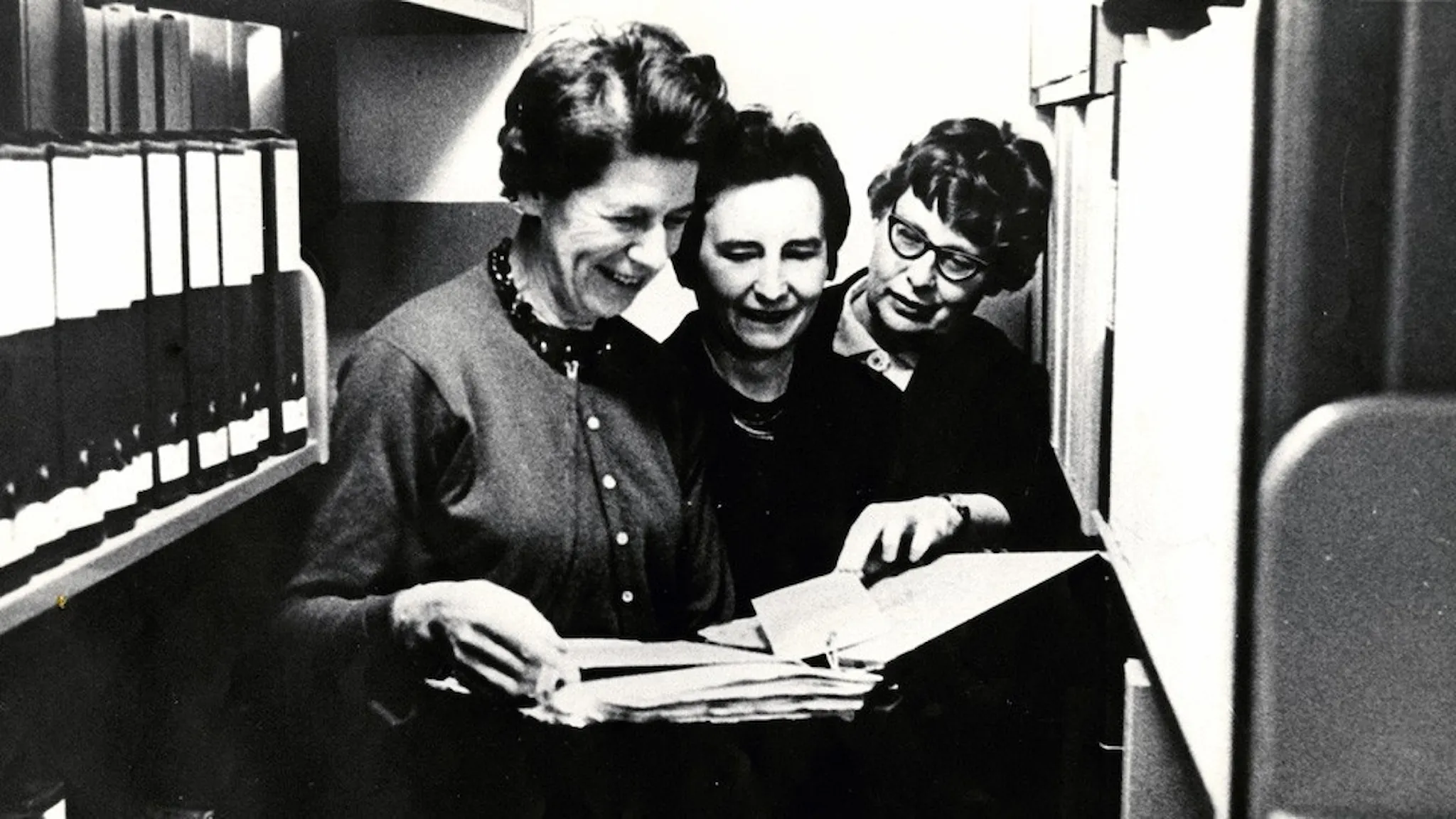
- Rosa Malmström (left), Asta Ekenvall (centre) and Eva Pineus (right)
- Born: Astrid Märta Hammarberg; 6 April 1913; Hädanberg, Anundsjö parish, Västernorrland County, Sweden
- Died: 12 December 2001 (aged 88); Spånga-Kista Parish, Stockholm, Sweden
- Occupations: librarian, women's historian and philosopher
- Years active: 1941–1993
- Known for: Co-founding the Kvinnohistorisk arkiv (Women's History Archive) at the University of Gothenburg
- Notable work: Manligt och kvinnligt: idéhistoriska studier (Male and Female: Ideas-Historical Studies, 1966)

Asta Ekenvall (6 April 1913 – 12 December 2001) was a Swedish librarian, one of the founders of the Kvinnohistorisk arkiv (Women's History Archive) of the University of Gothenburg and a pioneer in research and philosophy of women's history.

== Early life ==
Astrid Märta Hammarberg was born on 6 April 1913 in the village of Hädanberg of Anundsjö parish of Västernorrland County, Sweden to Anna Matilda (née Malmström) and Axel Hammarberg. Her father worked in forestry and Hammarberg was raised with her two sisters Elsa and Anna Lisa. She earned her high school diploma in 1932 from Läroverk in Umeå and then went on to study philosophy at Uppsala University. She studied under Johan Nordström, the creator of the new discipline Idé och lärdomshistoria, the history of intellectual ideas. Among her classmates were Sten G. Lindberg, Sten Lindroth, and Henrik Sandblad and her early research focused on the history of learning.

In 1939, she married the teacher and later school principal, Jonas Gunnar Verner Ekenvall, and the following year completed her dissertation for her licentiate. Ekenvall decided not to continue with a PhD, instead taking several years to raise her two children, Lena Kristina (1942) and Björn Axel (1945) and conducting research. When the couple moved from Linköping to Gothenburg, Ekenvall was one of the first two women awarded the Elin Wägner research grant. Her research focused on the disparity in the treatment of men's and women's intellectual value by Western academia.

== Career ==
In 1955, Ekenvall began to work as a librarian and in 1957 was hired at the Gothenburg City Library. In 1958, she joined with Rosa Malmström and Eva Pineus, who was chair of the Fredrika Bremer Association in Gothenburg, to set up the Kvinnohistoriskt arkiv (Women's History Archive). The purpose of the private archive was not only to preserve archival materials and maintain a record of current research into women's history, but also to provide a means to publish materials on women's history and issues. Because Ekenvall wanted to maintain the neutrality of the organization and not support political factions, she wrote to women from all walks of life, like Inga Thorsson and Barbro Alving asking for their support in the drive to create an international research center.

When the management of the Gothenburg City Library was transferred from the Gothenburg Municipality to state management as the Gothenburg University Library in 1961, Ekenvall transferred to the new organization and in 1968 was appointed as the head librarian. She continued her own research into women's history and in 1966, published Manligt och kvinnligt: idéhistoriska studier. Her study evaluated historic ideas of women by philosophers like Plato, Aristotle, and Thomas Aquinas, positing that their characterizations of women was one of subordinate helper whose purpose in life was to reproduce. Passing through history, these ideas then morphed into social customs treating men and women as opposites. In historic terms, men were subjects and women became objects; men became providers and women became beneficiaries, leading to customs in which men's value as paid laborers restricted women's ability to work outside the home. A "pioneering work", Manligt och kvinnligt was republished in 1992.

In 1972, Ekenvall was awarded an honorary doctorate in philosophy from the University of Gothenburg and that same year, the Kvinnohistoriskt arkiv was transferred to the care of the university, as the Kvinnohistoriska samlingarna (KvinnSam, Women's History Collections). Though she did not take over running the collections, Ekenvall continued her work as chief librarian and researcher at the university library. In 1978, she retired and then having lost her husband in 1975, moved to Stockholm. She continued her interdisciplinary approach to the evaluation of the roles women occupied throughout history, combining anthropology, historical analysis and philosophy to produce both research and textbooks. Some of her best known works from this period include Groddjuren som frukbarhetssymboler (Frogs as Fertility Symbols, 1974), which explored similarities in cultural views of fertility throughout history, and Batrachians som symboler för liv, död och kvinna (1978).

Ekenvall was an important player in the Swedish women's movement of the late 1970s and 1980s. Though she was committed to social involvement, Ekenvall drew a line between her activities in the women's movement and her research activities. In part, this was due to her recognition that to gain respect in the male-dominated academic world, research about women had to rely on a wide range of many different disciplines producing secure scientific results or they would be undervalued and dismissed. In 1982, she participated in the interdisciplinary women's university conference hosted in Umeå with around 200 of the most prominent women researchers of the era. Ekenvall was honored as a Professors namn (Named professor) by the Swedish government in 1994.

== Death and legacy ==
Ekenvall died on 12 December 2001 in Spånga-Kista Parish in Stockholm, Sweden. She was buried at the Västra kyrkogården in Gothenburg. In 2003, when her obituary was included as part of the Eulogies from 2001 to 2003 of University of Gothenburg intelligentsia, Eva-Lena Dahl credited Ekenvall and the women's archive as the foundation of the scholarly reputation of gender research held by the university library. In 2018, during the celebrations for the 60th anniversary of the KvinnSam, the successor organization to the archive begun by Ekenvall, Malmström, and Pinéus, their pivotal role in preserving women's history in Sweden was honored. Ekenvall's papers form part of the holdings of the archive

== Selected works ==
- Ekenvall, Asta (1941). Ett obeaktat zoologiskt bidrag av Linné i en tysk tidskrift 1743 [An unnoticed zoological contribution by Linnaeus in a German magazine 1743] (in Swedish). Uppsala, Sweden: Svenska Linnésällskapet. OCLC 1001659566.
- Ekenvall, Asta (1951). Eric Benzelius och de utländska lärda tidskrifterna [Eric Benzelius and the learned foreign magazines] (in Swedish). Uppsala, Sweden: Särtryck ur Lychnos. OCLC 186735425.
- Ekenvall, Asta (1954). Eric Benzelius d.y. och G.W. von Leibniz [Erik Benzelius the younger and Gottfried Wilhelm von Leibniz] (in Swedish). Linköping, Sweden: Särtryck ur Linköpings Biblioteks Handlingar. OCLC 925834118.
- Ekenvall, Asta (1956). "Kvinnan, historien och framtiden" [Woman, History and the Future]. Hertha (in Swedish). 43. Stockholm, Sweden: Fredrika Bremer Association: 9–10, 12–13. ISSN 0018-0912. OCLC 938434257.
- Ekenvall, Asta (1957). "Kvinnofrågornas historiska bakgrund" [The Historical Background of Women's Issues]. Hertha (in Swedish). 44. Stockholm, Sweden: Fredrika Bremer Association: 26, 33. ISSN 0018-0912. OCLC 936802310.
- Ekenvall, Asta (1966). Manligt och kvinnligt: idéhistoriska studier [Male and female: ideas-historical studies] (in Swedish). Gothenburg, Sweden: Akademiförlaget-Gumperts. OCLC 251382808.
- Ekenvall, Asta (1974). "Groddjuren som frukbarhetssymboler". In Qvist, Gunnar; Edström, Vivi (eds.). Kvinnomystik och kvinnopolitik: kvinnohistoriska studier [Women's Psychology and Women's Policy: Women's History Studies (Frogs as fertility symbols)]. Meddelanden från Historiska Institutionen i Göteborg (in Swedish). Vol. 6. Gothenburg, Sweden: E&B förlaget. pp. 9–53. OCLC 907579690.
- Ekenvall, Asta (1976). Women in the Nordic countries. Stockholm, Sweden: Riksutställningar. OCLC 186110272.
- Ekenvall, Asta (1978). Batrachians as symbols of life, death, and woman. Gothenburg, Sweden: Gothenburg University Library. ISBN 91-85206-20-2.
