= Hertha (magazine) =

Swedish women's magazine, founded 1914

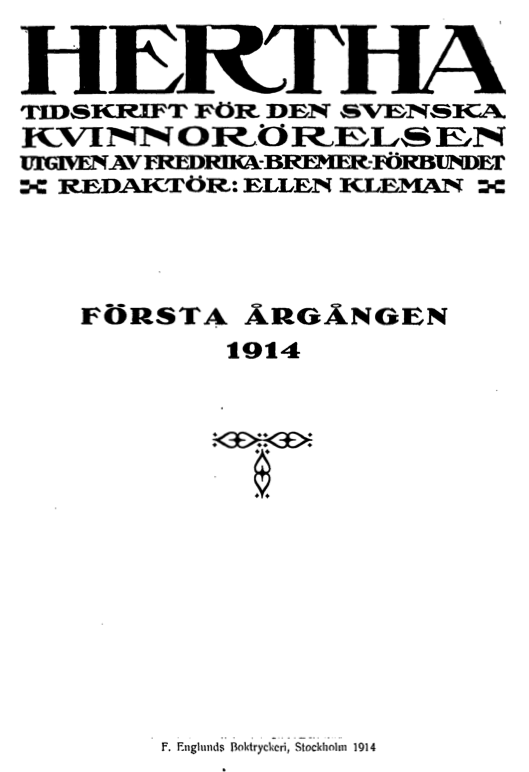
- The cover of the first issue of Hertha
- Editor: Camilla Wagner (2019)
- Categories: Women's magazine
- Publisher: Fredrika Bremer Association
- Founded: 1914
- Country: Sweden
- Language: Swedish
- Website: https://fredrikabremer.se/tidskriften-hertha/

Hertha is a Swedish-language women's magazine published by the Fredrika Bremer Association, (Swedish: Fredrika Bremer Förbundet, abbreviated FBF) named after Swedish writer and feminist Fredrika Bremer's novel Hertha. It has been in circulation since 1914.

== History and profile ==
Hertha was founded in 1914 and was published regularly until 1999. During this period it came out monthly. Between 2001 and 2005 it was published digitally only, and in 2009 an anniversary issue was published in print. Since 2015, two issues are published per year. It is the world's oldest feminist magazine, a continuation of Home Review founded in 1859.

Hertha was the successor to the magazine Dagny, which was started when Sophie Adlersparre founded the Fredrika Bremer Association in 1884. The magazine's history dates back to 1859, when Sophie Adlersparre and Rosalie Roos published Tidskrift för hemmet ('Home Review') to "give knowledge and insights to women in the spiritual sphere".

Hertha, like its predecessors Home Review and Dagny, contains association announcements, articles on current social, cultural, economic and ethical issues, and articles on gender equality.

== Editors and contributors ==
The magazine's editor from its inception until 1932 was Ellen Kleman. Among the writers for Hertha during its first decades were Elin Wägner, Emilia Fogelklou, Lydia Wahlström, Klara Johanson, Gurli Linder and Ida von Plomgren.

Margareta von Konow became editor in 1933, remaining in the role until 1948. She also became committee secretary to the Swedish women’s associations’ radio committee (1933-1937), set up by the FBF when von Konow's challenge to the minister of communication on the absence of women in the government inquiry into the new technology – radio - was ignored.

Major contributors in the 1960s were Birgitta Dahl and other women from the Social Democratic Party. In the 2000s, contributors include Lawen Mohtadi, Ebba Witt-Brattström, Kristina Hultman, Barbro Hedvall, Kajsa Ekis Ekman and Parvin Ardalan (in the 2009–2014 print editions). Since 2019, Camilla Wagner has been the editor-in-chief.

== See also ==
- Idun (magazine)
- Morgonbris
- Rösträtt för kvinnor
- Tidevarvet
