= Kleman =

Kleman is a surname. Notable people with the surname include:

- Anna Kleman (1862–1940), Swedish insurance officer and feminist
- Ellen Kleman (1867–1943), Swedish writer, newspaper editor, and women's rights activist, sister of Anna
- Maurice Kleman (1934–2021), French physicist
