= Margareta von Konow =

Swedish writer and feminist (1897–1999)

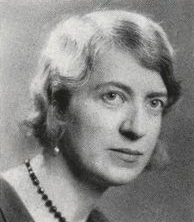
- Born: Emma Margareta Isabella von Zweigbergk; 17 July 1897; Sandhem, Falköping, Skaraborg County, Sweden
- Died: 2 August 1999 (aged 102); Stockholm, Sweden
- Resting place: Norra begravningsplatsen
- Occupations: Journalist, editor, author, feminist

Emma Margareta Isabella von Konow (née von Zweigbergk; 17 July 1897 – 2 August 1999) was a Swedish journalist, editor, author and feminist.

== Early life and education ==
Emma Margareta Isabella von Zweigbergk was born on 17 July 1897 at the Mosseberg estate in Sandhem parish outside Falköping in Skaraborg County to Magna Noring (b. 1865) and Axel von Zweigbergk (1862–1935). Her father was a landowner and a member of the Swedish nobility. When the family experienced financial problems, they moved to the Sölvesborg area. The young Margareta went to school in Karlshamn as a boarder, and was the only girl in her class to take the realskolexamen school-leaving exam. She then moved to Sävsjö, and completed her secondary school education in Jönköping as a private student, writing her 1915 university matriculation paper on Swedish writer and reformer, Fredrika Bremer.

Von Zweigbergk became interested in politics at an early age, particularly gender equality issues. She subscribed to the journal Rösträtt för kvinnor (Voting Rights for Women), published by the National Association for Women's Suffrage (LKPR), from its inception in 1912. In Sävsjö, she attended lectures at the local branch of the LKPR, and graduated from Lund University in 1918 with a Bachelor of Arts in Literature, German, English and Political Science. While studying in Lund, she was secretary of the Kvinnliga studentföreningen (Female Student Association), and was a key participant in the first female student play performed in Lund by writing and performing a play called Justitia or sic framåt gloria mundi. She then travelled the country speaking for the LKPR while working as a substitute teacher at Norrköping Girls' School.

== Journalistic career ==
With her degree in languages, and with good contacts, in 1919 von Zweigbergk got a job at Skandinaviska Banken in Stockholm handling the bank's foreign correspondence. In her spare time, she began writing daily verses and conducting interviews for the conservative daily paper Nya Dagligt Allehanda, and then became a regular contributor from 1925 to 1931, under the pen name Delila. From 1926 to 1932 she was also editor of the ‘Kvinnoröster’ section of the newspaper Svenska Medborgaren, published by the Allmänna Valmansförbundet, later the Moderate Party.

Margareta von Zweigbergk met her future husband, the lawyer Ulf von Konow, during an interview for Nya Dagligt Allehanda. They married in 1926 and she became known as Margareta von Konow. Ulf von Konow was an expert in literary, musical and artistic copyright issues and legal representative for, among others, the Swedish Union for Performing Arts and Film, Swedish Theatre Association and the Swedish Writers' Association, as well as one of the founders of Svenska tonsättares internationella musikbyrå (STIM) (International Music Bureau of Swedish Composers). The couple socialised widely in the writers' and artists' circles of the time and had two children.

== Involvement in organisations ==
When her first child was born in 1931, von Konow was no longer allowed to work at Nya Dagligt Allehanda, due to the employment laws of the time. However, in 1932, she was awarded a Lars Hierta scholarship to travel to Geneva and study the city as a political and socio-political information centre.

After writing for the weekly magazine Idun, among other publications, she became editor of Hertha, the Fredrika Bremer Association's (Fredrika-Bremer-Förbundet, often abbreviated to FBF) magazine in 1933, and remained there until 1948. She was secretary of the association from 1938 to 1943, and editor of the anniversary publication I Fredrika Bremers spår in 1944.

In 1933, as the newly appointed editor of Hertha, Margareta von Konow personally courted the then Minister of Communications. She highlighted the complete lack of women in the inquiry set up by the government into the development and future of the then relatively new medium of radio. Her call for a different composition of the inquiry was not immediately heeded, but her employer, the FBF, took the initiative to set up the Svenska kvinnoföreningars radiokommitté (Swedish Women's Organisations Radio Committee) (1933–1937), and von Konow became its secretary.

The committee was successful in its efforts to get more women onto programme boards and radio programmes. Von Konow became vice-chairman of the broadcasting committee of the International Council of Women in 1945–1946.

In 1934, von Konow scripted a publicity film fronted by Ida von Plomgren about the FBF, narrating how far the fight for women's rights had come and sharing some of the organisation's areas of activity, including a visit to the FBF office at Klarabergsgatan 48, where von Plomgren joked that her door sign should read "Ask me about everything – because that's what the Swedish people do".

During the years when she had small children at home, she was a member of Stocksund municipal council 1935–1939, secretary of the Nya Idun Society 1938–1940 and vice-chairman 1940–1941. In the 1960s she continued to serve as secretary of Minerva, the Sveriges Författarförbund's non-fiction section.

== Authorship ==
As Margareta von Konow approached retirement age, she made her debut as a fiction writer in 1962 with the poetry collection Den stängda porten: dikter. The collection was well received, and over the years she published fifteen collections of poetry, essays, and memoirs.

== Death ==
Margareta von Konow died on 2 August 1999 in Stockholm, age 102 and was buried at Norra begravningsplatsen in Solna.

== Bibliography ==
- 1962: Den stängda porten (The closed gate): poems. Uppsala: Bokgillet.
- 1965: På andra sidan berget: poems. Stockholm: Diakonistyrelsen.
- 1968: Ja, se fruntimmer-: a selection of aphorisms about women. Stockholm: Bok o. bild.
- 1969: Blir det resning i målet? (Will the case be resolved? ): essays. Stocksund: Klio.
- 1969: I nöd och lust (In sickness and in health): aphorisms and quotations on marriage / selected and annotated by Margareta von Konow. Stockholm: Bok o. bild.
- 1971: Blå är timmen (Blue is the hour). Stockholm: Proprius.
- 1974: Panorama: short poems. Stocksund: Klio.
- 1976: Avigt och rätt: minnen och randanteckningar. Stockholm: Författares bokmaskin.
- 1977: Upplevt och oupplevt: short poems. Stockholm: Författares bokmaskin.
- 1978: Människor, möten, miniatyrer [(1900–1978)] (People, meetings, miniatures [(1900–1978)]. Stockholm: Författares bokmaskin.
- 1982: Ömfotade ord: aforismer med mera. (Tenderfoot words: aphorisms and more. ) Stockholm: Författares bokmaskin.
- 1983: Flickorna i vita huset: [en ramberättelse]. (The girls in the white house) Stockholm: Författares bokmaskin.
- 1992: Ge inte upp, ge igen!: [infamt påpassade flickor]. (Don't give up, give back!: [infamous girls]) Stockholm: Författares bokmaskin.
- 1998: Sorti: några minnen från ett gånget sekel. (some memories from a past century) Stockholm: Proprius.
