= Disa Västberg =

Swedish politician (1891–1966)

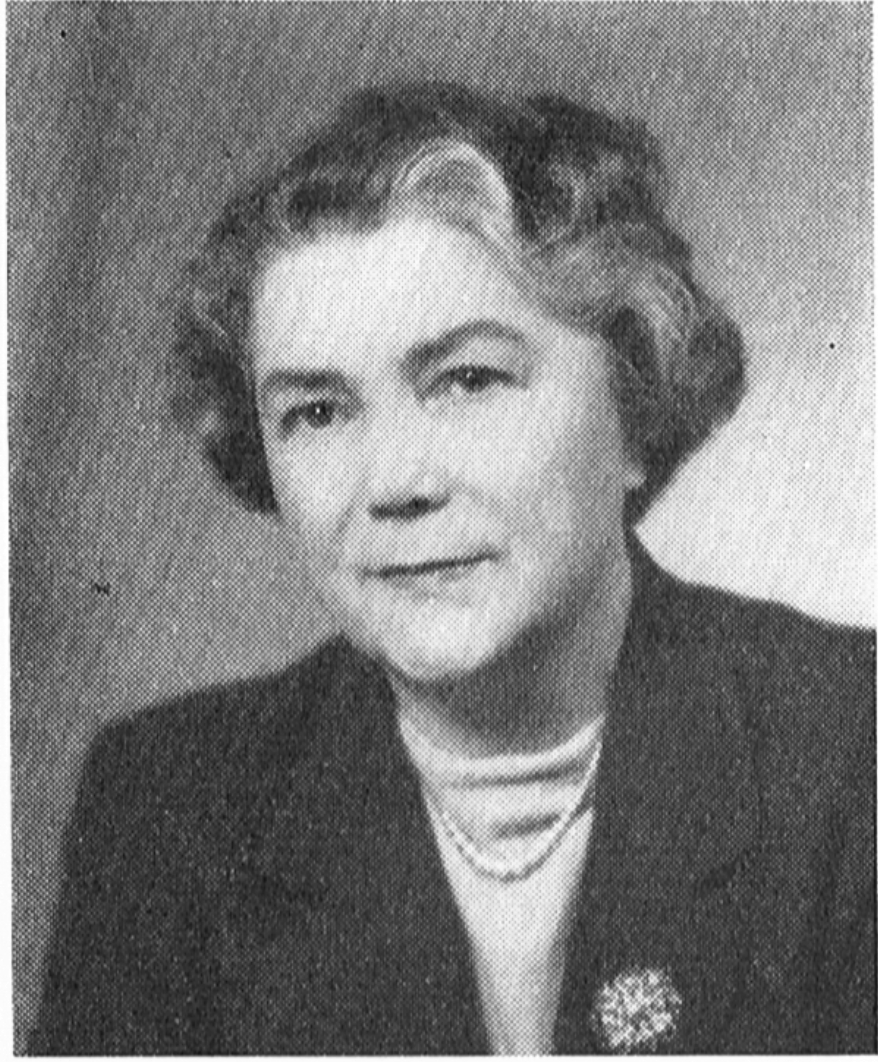
Disa Västberg

Rebecka Desideria "Disa" Västberg (17 May 1891 – 25 August 1966) was a Swedish politician (Social Democrat). She was Chairperson of the Medelpad local branch of Social Democratic Women in Sweden in 1917–1928, and Member of the Sundsvall City Council in 1919. Västberg was the editor of Morgonbris in 1936–1952. She was the chairperson of the Social Democratic Women in Sweden in 1936–1952. Västberg was MP of the andra kammaren of the Riksdag in 1941–1956.

== Life ==
Rebecka Desideria "Disa" Västberg was born in 1891. She was the daughter of a sawmill-worker and worked as a waitress. In 1911, she married Moje Västberg, editor of the Social Democratic newspaper Nya Samhället of Sundsvall. She may have had an illegitimate daughter Maj Leontina in 1910. With her husband she had one son.

She was a Swedish politician for the Social Democrat party. Throughout her career she often advanced policies concerning children and education. She was Chairperson of the Medelpad local branch of Social Democratic Women in Sweden in 1917–1928, and Member of the Sundsvall City Council in 1919. She was the editor of Morgonbris, the journal of the Social Democratic Women in Sweden, from 1936 to 1952. She was the chairperson of the Social Democratic Women in Sweden in 1936–1952.

She was MP of the andra kammaren of the Riksdag in 1941–1956. A festschrift was published in honour of her sixtieth birthday, titled Socialdemokratisk kvinnogärning.

She died in 1966, and is buried at Skogskyrkogården in Gamla Enskede in Stockholm.
