= Eva Pineus =

Swedish politician, librarian and women's rights activist

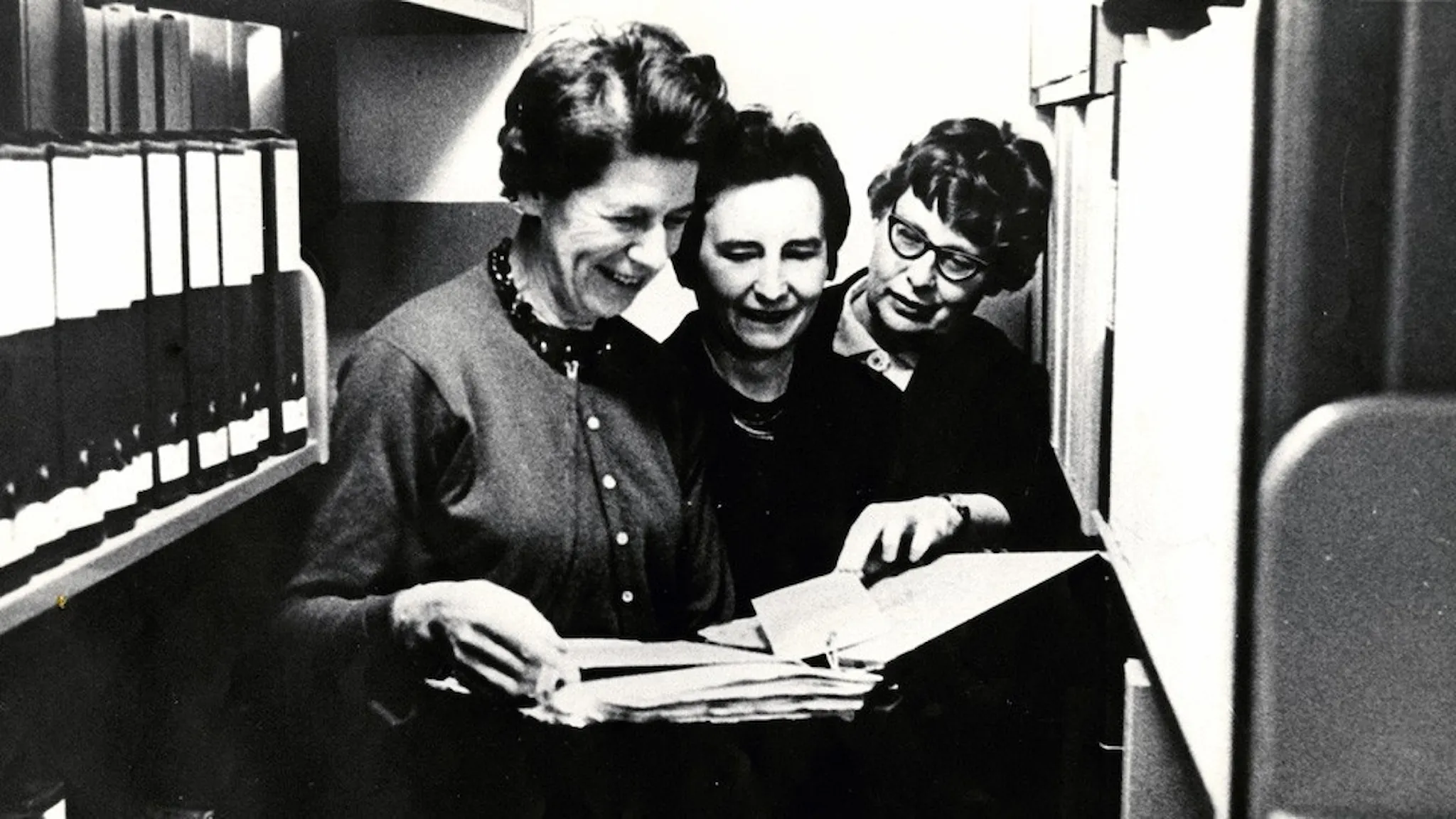
From left to right: Rosa Malmström, Asta Ekenvall and Eva Pineus

Eva Hilda Cecilia Pineus née Palme (1905–1985), was a Swedish politician, librarian and women's rights activist. Pineus was an active member of the Liberal Party's women association Folkpartiet liberalernas kvinnoförbund and of the Gothenburg branch of the women's rights organization Fredrika Bremer Association. In 1958 together with Asta Ekenvall and Rosa Malmström she co-founded the women's historical literature archive Kvinnohistoriskt Arkiv, known today as KvinnSam.

== Early life and education ==
Born in Djursholm on 26 September 1905, Eva Hilda Cecilia Palme was the daughter of the civil engineer Lennart Palme and his wife Cecilia née Günther. In 1930, she married Kaj Pineus, a municipal politician in Gothenburg, with whom she had three children. After completing her school education in Djursholm, she studied languages abroad, especially in France and the United States.

== Career ==
Before her marriage, she worked for a time at the Royal Swedish Library. After moving to Gothenburg, she became an active member of the Liberal Party's Women's Association, soon becoming its secretary. From 1947 to 1952, she chaired the Gothenburg branch of the influential women's rights organization Fredrika Bremer Association where she was successful in establishing lasting relationships with women's organizations in the other Nordic countries.

In the late 1950s, when Asta Ekenvall and Rosa Malmström were planning to create a historical archive of women's literature, they invited Pineus to join them as an influential women's rights activist. In 1958, the three established the early research archive which formed a basis for women's studies. Ekenvall was chair, Malström the archivist and Pineus, secretary. In 1971, it was transferred to Gothenburg University Library where it was known as Kvinnohistoriska Samlingarna (Women's Literature Collection), now simplified to KvinnSam. It was thanks to Pineus' skillful fundraising that the archive was able to continue development until a post of archive librarian at the university library was created in 1971.

Pineus was also active in the art sphere, serving on the board of Gothenburg University's School of Arts, Crafts and Design (1947–1967), on that of the art association Spiran (1955–1967) and chairing the Friends of Röhsska Museum (1961–1972).

Eva Pineus died in Gothenburg on 9 March 1985 and is buried in the city's Kviberg Cemetery.
