= Home Review =

Swedish women's magazine

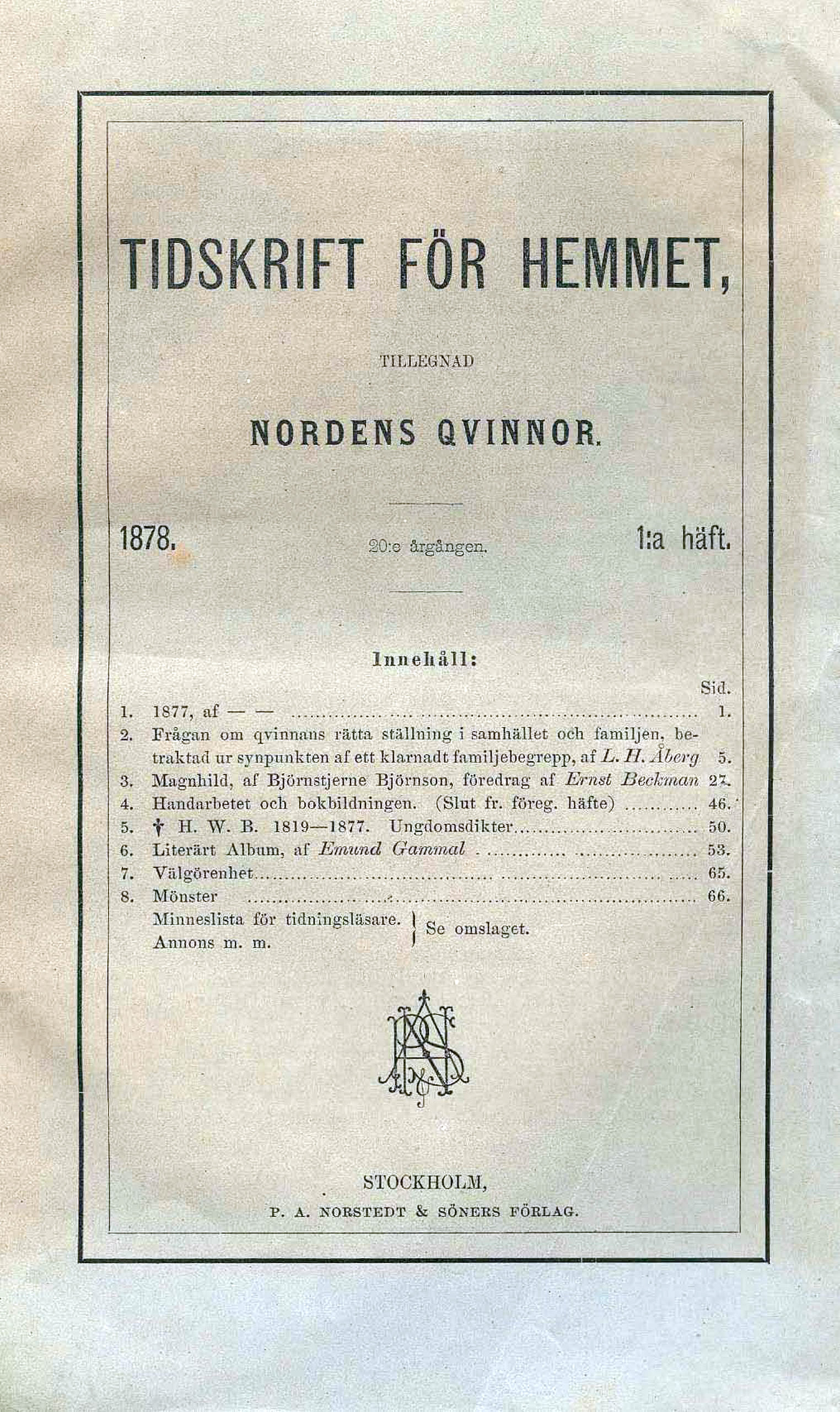

The Home Review (Swedish: Tidskrift för hemmet) was a Swedish women's magazine, published from 1859 to 1885. It was the first women's magazine in the Nordic countries and its inception is sometimes regarded as the foundation of Sweden's women's movement. It was sometimes published as the Swedish Woman's Home Review (Tidskrift för hemmet tillegnad den svenska qvinnan) and after 1868 was known as the Nordic Women's Home Review (Tidskrift för hemmet tillegnad Nordens qvinnor).

== History ==
The Home Review was founded by Sophie Adlersparre and Rosalie Olivecrona in Stockholm in 1859. It treated issues within women's rights and gender equality such as women's education, property rights, and legal status. Aside from this, the magazine also contained novels, serials, and popular science. It also featured poems and short stories. In 1886, the magazine was replaced by Dagny, the paper of the Fredrika Bremer Association. Dagny was renamed Hertha in 1914 after Fredrika Bremer's novel by the same name.

== See also ==
- Idun (magazine)
- Morgonbris
- Rösträtt för kvinnor
- Tidevarvet
