= Else Kleen =

Swedish journalist (1882–1968)

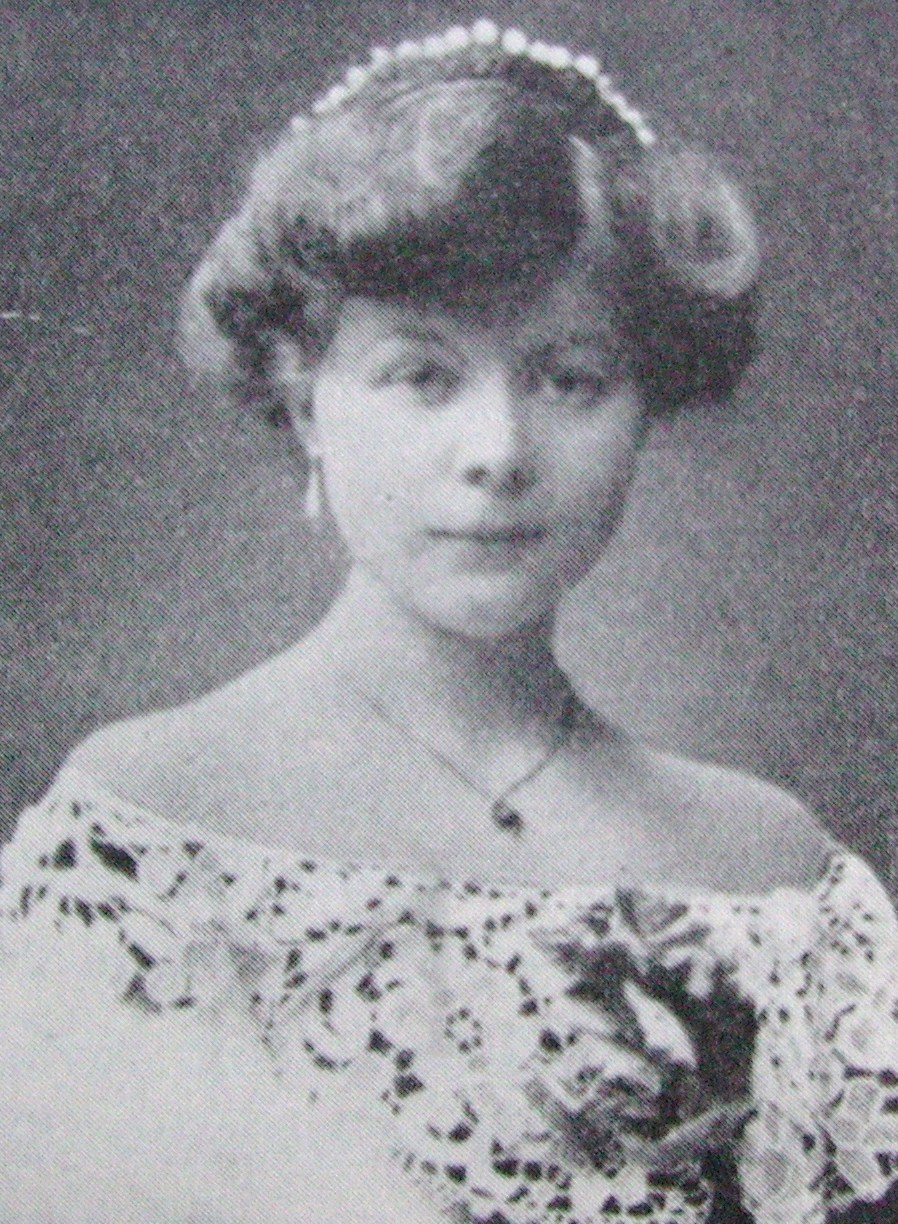
Else Kleen

Else Kleen (newspaper pseudonym, Gwen; 1882–1968) was a Swedish journalist, author, and social reformer.

== Biography ==
She was a well-known participator in public debate in the Swedish press for sixty years. She was a reporter at Dagens Nyheter from 1906 to 1910, at Stockholms Dagblad in 1910, and at Stockholms-Tidningen from 1911 to 1961. She was co-founder of the Hjälpföreningen för psykisk hälsovård (Association for Mental Health Care) and a member of its board from 1917 to 1968, and a board member of Långholmen prison from 1946 to 1968. As an author, she is perhaps most known as a fashion journalist, advising women on how to dress elegantly and practically at a small cost. As a social reformer, she is known for her struggle for a humane treatment of the insane and prison inmates.
