= Dagny (magazine) =

Feminist magazine in Sweden (1886–1913)

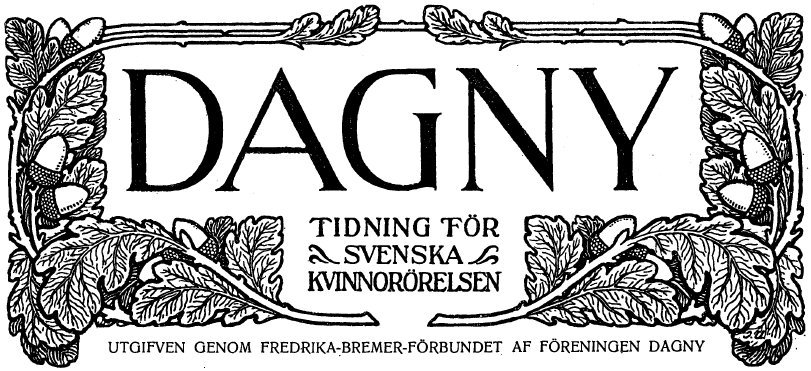
- Former editors: Lotten Dahlgren
- Categories: Women's magazine
- Frequency: Weekly
- Publisher: Fredrika Bremer Association
- Founded: 1886
- Final issue: 1913
- Country: Sweden
- Based in: Stockholm
- Language: Swedish

Dagny was a women's magazine published from 1886 to 1913 in Stockholm, Sweden. The title of the magazine bore the statement Utgifvet af Fredrika-Bremer Förbundet (Swedish: published by the Fredrika Bremer Association), indicating its publisher. It was subtitled as Tidskrift för sociala och litterära intressen (Swedish: Journal for social and literary interests). It is the first Swedish magazine which covered social issues from women's perspective and assumed a leading position in the suffrage movement in Sweden from 1903.

== History and profile ==
Dagny was launched in 1886 as a successor to another women's magazine, Tidskrift för hemmet, which was published from 1859 to 1885. Its publisher was the Fredrika Bremer Association. According to doctor Folke Henschen, son of doctor Salomon Henschen, the periodical was named after his sister, translator Dagny Henschen. The magazine was headquartered in Stockholm and published on a weekly basis. The editor of Dagny was Lotten Dahlgren, who held the post between 1891 and 1907.

The page number of Dagny varied between 15 and 35 in the period 1900 to 1907 and was 12 from 1908 to 1913. Its size was 22 cm (8.7 in) from 1900 to 1907 and 32 cm (13 in) from 1908 to 1913.

Dagny folded in 1913 and was succeeded by Hertha, another women's magazine. The full issues of Dagny have been archived in the Swedish National Archives and in the Gothenburg University Library.

== See also ==
- Idun
- Morgonbris
- Rösträtt för kvinnor
- Tidevarvet
