= Rösträtt för kvinnor =

Swedish journal published 1912–1919

- Publisher: Swedish National Association for Women's Suffrage
- First issue: 1 March 1912
- Final issue Number: 1 December 1919; 105 years ago Volume 8, number 15
- Country: Sweden
- Based in: Stockholm
- Language: Swedish

Rösträtt för kvinnor ('Suffrage for Women') was a journal published by the Swedish National Association for Women's Suffrage. It was first published in 1912 and the last issue was published in 1919, when the Riksdag (Swedish Parliament) decided to extend universal suffrage to men and women. The journal's motto was: "We can never do as much for a great cause as a great cause can do for us."

== History ==
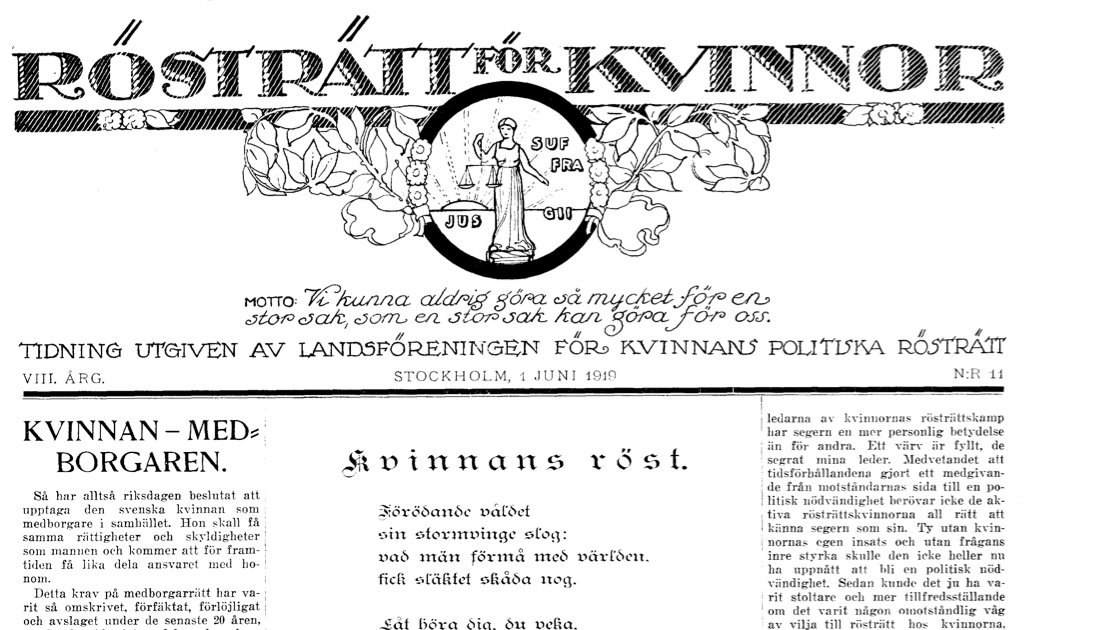
First page of the final issue in 1919, focusing entirely on women's newly won suffrage.

The National Association for Women's Suffrage (Landsföreningen för kvinnans politiska rösträtt, LKPR) had been using the Fredrika Bremer Association's journal Dagny as a mouthpiece. Cooperation between the two could be problematic at times; LKPR was against the fact that the editors of Dagny also allowed opponents of suffrage to publish in the journal. The collaboration ended in 1911, and the following year LKPR published the first issue of Rösträtt för kvinnor.

Its first editor was Elisabeth Krey-Lange, followed by Ester Brisman from 1913 to 1914; Brisman was then editor-in-chief from 1913 to 1919. Most of the most prominent figures in the Swedish women's movement contributed articles, including Gulli Petrini, Anna Lindhagen, Ellen Key, Lydia Wahlström, Elsa Collin, Karolina Widerström, Anna Bugge-Wicksell, and Signe Bergman.

Eight years after the journal's launch, in May 1919, Parliament voted to extend the right to vote to women. The June 1919 issue was devoted entirely to suffrage reform and women's new role as citizens. The last issue of the journal was published in December 1919.

== See also ==
- Hertha (magazine)
- Idun (magazine)
- Morgonbris
- Tidevarvet
- Tidskrift för hemmet
