= Signe Vessman =

Swedish politician

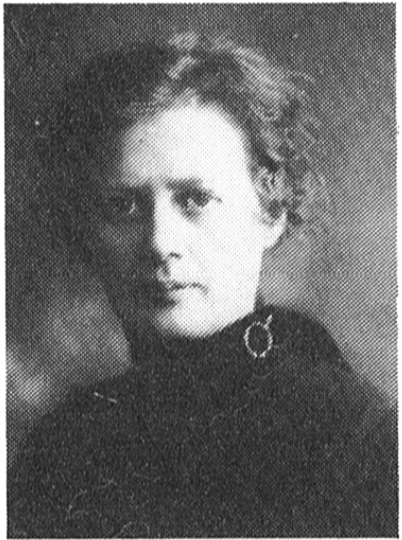
Signe Vessman

Signe Vessman (also Signe Svensson; 20 June 1879 – 25 March 1953) was a Swedish Social Democrat politician. Working as a seamstress, she became active in union work and engaged in the social democratic movement from its early days. Vessman was the chairperson of the Women's Trade Union from 1906 to 1908, ombudsman in the Tailor's Union from 1909 to 1911; cashier for Morgonbris from 1911 to 1920 and its editor from 1920 to 1932. She was the chairperson of the Social Democratic Women in Sweden from 1920 to 1936, the Socialist Women's Committee from 1923 to 1936, and MP of the andra kammaren of the Riksdag from 1925 to 1928.

== Life ==
Signe Vessman was born in 1879 in Stockholm. Her parents were the stonemason August Svensson and Maria Kristina Graaf. She married the bank clerk Johan Adolf Vessman (1877–1966) in 1914. Working as a seamstress, she became active in union work and engaged in the social democratic movement early on.

Vessman was the chairperson of the Women's Trade Union from 1906 to 1908, ombudsman in the Tailor's Union from 1909 to 1911; cashier for Morgonbris from 1911 to 1920 and its editor from 1920 to 1932. She was the chairperson of the Social Democratic Women in Sweden from 1920 to 1936, the Socialist Women's Committee from 1923 to 1936, and MP of the andra kammaren of the Riksdag from 1925 to 1928, following Hjalmar Branting's death. Vessman resigned from the Social Democratic party women’s federation of Sweden in 1936 for health reasons, but was still elected honorary chair of the organisation in 1939.

She died on 25 March 1953 and is buried in the Norra cemetery in Solna.
