= KvinnSam =

National gender studies library of Sweden

Coordinates: 57.69555°N 11.98529°E

KvinnSam - National Resource Library for Gender Studies, formerly the Women's History Collections, is the Swedish National Resource Library for Gender Studies. The collections belong to University of Gothenburg Library.

== History ==
The Kvinnohistoriskt arkiv (Women's History Archive) was established in 1958 by two librarians who were working at the Gothenburg City Library, Asta Ekenvall and Rosa Malmström, along with the chair of the Fredrika Bremer Association in Gothenburg, Eva Pineus. Established as a self-supporting, private archive the women hoped to preserve archival materials, create and maintain a record of current research into women's history, and provide a publishing mechanism for materials on women's history and issues. Ekenvall contacted prominent women throughout Sweden asking them to donate materials for the archive and some of her earliest acquisitions included letters and diaries by Barbro Alving, Emilia Fogelklou, Åsa Moberg and Elin Wägner, among others. The first publication produced by the Archive was Malmström's Kvinnliga präster, bibliografi över i Sverige tryckt litteratur (Female Priests, bibliography of literature printed in Sweden, 1958). In 1972, Ekenvall, who at the time was chief librarian at the Gothenburg University Library, transferred the archive into the care of University of Gothenburg. The university renamed the collection the Kvinnohistoriska samlingarna (Women's History Collections) and hired a half-time librarian to manage the records.

Since 2010, the KvinnSam has been called the National National Library for Gender Research and is the largest collection of gender-related research in the Nordic countries. Five full-time librarians work to manage the collection, preserving and digitizing archival materials. The library collects and organizes material on gender issues. This includes everything from academic theses to small leaflets and debate articles. The collections also comprise a manuscript collection with texts and photographs. Parts of these have been digitized and are now freely available on the Internet. A wide range of women's journals, from the 19th century onwards, are also digitized.

KvinnSam produces four databases:

- KVINNSAM is the largest database on gender research in the Nordic countries. It contains more than 140,000 items
- GENA (GENusAvhandlingar) is a database of PhD-theses in Women's Studies, Men's Studies and Gender Research in Sweden, from 1960 onwards.
- GREDA (Gender Researchers Database) contains presentations of Swedish gender researchers.
- JÄMDA (Jämställdhetsdatabasen) is the newest database, launched in December 2009. It contains literature about gender mainstreaming and also about gender equality in a wider sense.

GENA, GREDA and JÄMDA have all been developed in collaboration with the Swedish National Secretariat for Gender Research.

The references in the databases are indexed with keywords chosen from a special list, in which the gender aspect is implicit. The keyword “journalists” implies female journalists, for male journalists you write “journalists: men”.

== See also ==
- Svenskt kvinnobiografiskt lexikon (Biographical Dictionary of Swedish Women)
- List of libraries in Sweden
