= Ellen Kleman =

Swedish writer and women's rights activist

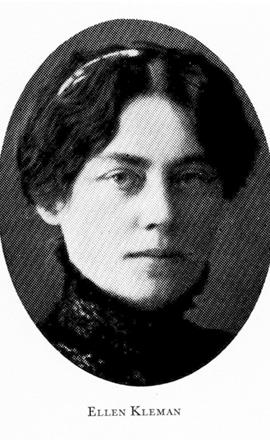
Ellen Kleman

Ellen Emma Augusta Kleman (1867–1943) was a Swedish writer, newspaper editor and women's rights activist. From 1907, she was editor of Dagny, a journal in support of the women's movement, replaced in 1914 by Hertha, which she also edited until 1932.

== Biography ==
Born in Karlskrona in 1867, Ellen Emma Augusta Kleman was the daughter of Commander Carl Kleman (1820–1872) and Johanna Augusta Grahm (1825–1904). Her older sister, Anna Kleman (1862–1940), was also active in the women's movement. After attending the girls' school in Karlskrona, she worked in banks in Uppsala and Stockholm.

Kleman was an avid supporter of women's rights. In 1907, she became editor of Dagny, the principal organ of the women's movement. She wrote many of the articles herself, including accounts of women's conventions and biographies of notable women. When Dagny ceased publication in 1913, she became the editor of its replacement Hertha from 1914 to 1932. In 1921, she served on the board of the Fredrika Bremer Association, the Swedish women's rights organization, chairing its Stockholm chapter from 1922 to 1931.

She became strongly interested in the association's founder, Fredrika Bremer (1801–1865), publishing a collection of essays about her. Together with her friend Klara Johanson, with whom she lived from 1912 until she died, Kleman published four large volumes of Bremer's letters.

In addition to her writings on the women's movement, Kleman published a historical novel titled Fabian Wendts hustru (Fabian Wendt's Wife) about women who have been manipulated and guided by others, without any opportunity for self-development.

== Awards ==
In 1942, Kleman was honoured with the Illis Quorum medal, the highest award for Swedish individuals.
