= Anna von Zweigbergk =

Swedish journalist and author

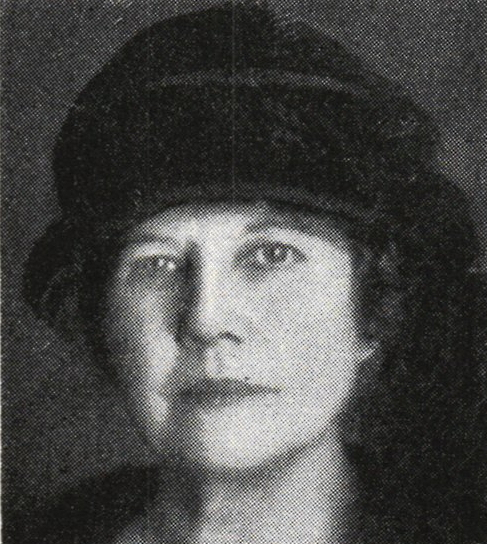
Anna von Zweigbergk

Anna Maria von Zweigbergk (née Christenson; 16 February 1865 – 3 May 1952) was a Swedish journalist and author. She was a reporter of Aftonbladet in 1888–1894, at the paper Småland in 1894–1896, and at Dagens Nyheter in 1896–1898.

She was the daughter of the landowner A. J. Christenson och Elna Persson. She married the reporter Otto von Zweigbergk in 1891. She was a friend of the writers Victoria Benedictsson and Axel Lundegård, and their correspondence is preserved.

She is known as a pioneer: she belonged to the pioneer generation of women reporters in Sweden and was the first Swedish woman reporter to have published a modern form of interview (of Oscar Montelius) in 1890. She continued to work after marriage, which was also unusual for a woman in this time period. She ended her career because her spouse became the editor-in-chief of the paper where they were both employed, and the staff protested against the nepotism of having the wife of their boss employed at his own paper.

The writer and journalist Valfrid Spångberg described her as "a skilful journalist, one of the first female ones in the Stockholm press, in her area the very first".
