= Lotten Dahlgren =

Swedish writer, journalist, newspaper editor, feminist, and suffragist

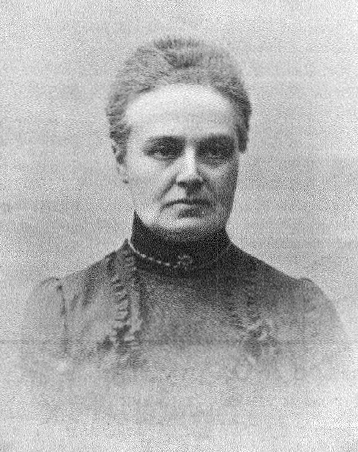
- Lotten Dahlgren in 1908
- Born: Eva Charlotta Carolina Dahlgren; 23 April 1851; Stockholm, Sweden
- Died: 14 January 1934 (aged 82); Djursholm, Sweden
- Occupations: Writer; journalist

Eva Charlotta Carolina Dahlgren (23 April 1851 – 14 January 1934) was a Swedish writer, journalist, newspaper editor, feminist, and suffragist. From 1891 to 1907, she served as the editor of the periodical Dagny, a leading mouthpiece of the Swedish women's movement. She was also a member of Fredrika Bremer Association, the oldest women's rights organisation in the country. She was awarded the Swedish royal medal Litteris et Artibus for her contributions to literature and history.

== Early life ==
Lotten Dahlgren was born on 23 April 1851 in Stockholm, Sweden. Her father, Fredrik August Dahlgren, was a public servant and had a successful career as an author. Among his works was Värmlänningarne, a comedy that was first performed in 1846. In the 1870s, he became known for his poetry in Swedish dialect, and in 1971, he was inducted into the Swedish Academy. Dahlgren's mother Ulrica "Ulla" von Heland was the niece of writer, historian, and poet Erik Gustaf Geijer. Born into an affluent family, Dahlgren developed an interest in writing. She attended a private school in Stockholm and later undertook language studies abroad. After completing education, she worked as a teacher for some years.

== Career ==
Dahlgren's writing career began in the late 1880s. She worked as an editor of the newspaper Aftonbladet. In 1887, she became a board member of the Fredrika Bremer Association (FBF), the oldest women's rights organisation in Sweden. In 1891, she became an editor of the association's journal, Dagny – a magazine focusing on women's rights, gender roles, and feminism in Sweden, and remained on its board till 1907. During this time, she wrote several articles on literary topics as well as on female political spectrum. Under the auspices of FBF, she delivered lectures on working-class women, and wrote satirical poetry and farces. In support of the women's suffrage movement at the time, she served as a representative of FBF on the suffrage committee. From 1901 to 1906, she was the secretary of the society Nya Idun.

As an author, Dahlgren published several accounts of her family history. Ransäter. Värmländska släktminnen från adertonhundratalets förra hälft upptecknade, published in 1905, was a major breakthrough in her literary career. It proved to be so popular that she had to resign from Dagny's editorial board to focus on her writing. She further cemented her reputation as an author when she released Ur Ransäters familjearkiv. Dagboks- och brefutdrag sammanförda two years later. From 1905 to 1916, Dahlgren continued writing on personal histories. She released seven volumes of her family's letters and documents from her hometown Värmland. As an admirer of feminist reformer Fredrika Bremer (1801–1865), Dahlgren's works focused on presenting the cultural history of her hometown Värmland, and writing accounts on women.

== Later years ==
In the 1920s, Dahlgren wrote memoirs which were published by Wahlström & Widstrand. In 1921, Dahlgren was honoured with the Swedish royal medal Litteris et Artibus for her services to literature and history. She released her final book Frances von Koch a few months before her death.

Dahlgren died in Djursholm, on 14 January 1934.
