= Rosa Malmström =

Swedish feminist, schoolteacher and librarian (1906–1995)

Rosa Astrid Tyra Malmström
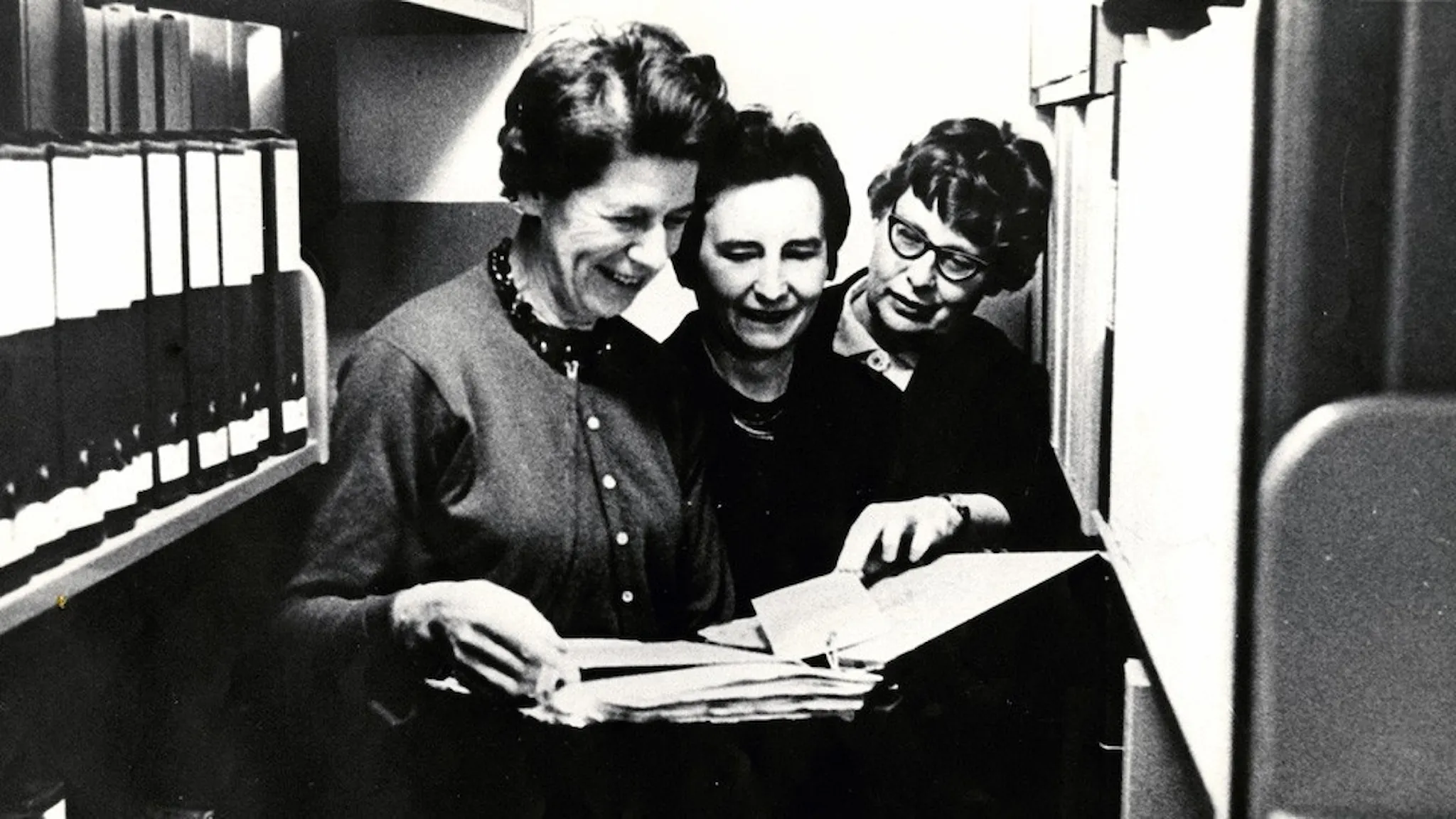
- From left to right: Rosa Malmström, Asta Ekenvall and Eva Pineus
- Born: Rosa Astrid Tyra Malmström; 10 July 1906; Regna, Östergötland, Sweden
- Died: 1995 (aged 88–89); Gothenburg, Sweden
- Occupations: Feminist, schoolteacher, librarian

Rosa Astrid Tyra Malmström (1906–1995) was a Swedish feminist, schoolteacher and librarian. She is remembered in particular for her focus on women's literature while working at University of Gothenburg Library from 1938 until her retirement. Recognising the discrimination suffered by women in the library classification system, together with the literary historian Asta Ekenvall and the women's rights activist Eva Pineus, in 1958 she co-founded Kvinnohistorisk Arkiv, a foundation devoted to women's studies which in 1971 became known as Kvinnohistorisk Samlingarna (Women's Historical Collection), now KvinnSam. Malmström's significant contribution to Nordic biographical research was recognized by University of Gothenburg in 1987 when she was awarded the title of honorary professor. In 1994, the Swedish government promoted her to full professor.

== Early life ==
Born in Regna, Östergötland on 10 July 1906, Rosa Astrid Tyra Malmström was the daughter of Axel Malmström. After matriculating from school in Vänersborg in 1928, she attended Gothenburg College where she qualified as a teacher with a master's degree.

== Career ==
After first teaching in a private school in Stockholm, she decided to change course and sought a position in Gothenburg's central library (later the university library). After serving her probation, she received a permanent post and was engaged there until she retired in 1971.

Realizing that women's works were not acquired on the same basis as those written by men and that there was even discrimination in the library's classification system, she became increasingly interested in researching literature about women. As a result, she began to compile a biography of Swedish women as an alternative to the accepted Svensk historisk bibliografi (Swedish Historical Bibliography). In 1958 she published a bibliography of literature in Sweden on women clergy Kvinnliga präster: bibliografi över i Sverige tryckt litteratur.

Collaborating with Asta Ekenvall, who had experienced difficulty in finding works by women in bibliographies, Malström embarked on research into women's literature. Together with the women's rights activist Eva Pineus from the Fredrika-Bremer Foundation, in 1958 they established the foundation Kvinnohistoriskt Arkiv dedicated to women's studies. As the need for further work became more widely recognized, several women's associations attached to political parties jointly called for parliamentary support. As a result, a library post was established and the foundation transferred its holdings to University of Gothenburg. It was there that facilities were made available for developing the women's literature collection Kvinnohistoriska Samlingarna, now known as KvinnSam.

Rosa Malmström died in Gothenburg in 1995 and is buried in the city's Norra Cemetery.

== Awards ==
Malmström's significant contribution to Nordic biographical research was recognized by University of Gothenburg in 1987 when she was awarded the title of honorary professor. In 1994, the Swedish government promoted her to full professor.
