= Zweigbergk family =

Swedish noble family

Zweigbergk family Zweygberg
- Country: Northern Europe (Finland, Sweden)
- Origin: Bohemia

The Zweigbergk family or von Zweigbergk is a Swedish family of Bohemian origin.

== Notable members ==
- Anna von Zweigbergk
- Helena von Zweigbergk
- Margareta von Konow, (née Von Zweigbergk) (1897-1999), Swedish journalist, editor, author and feminist.
