= Morgonbris =

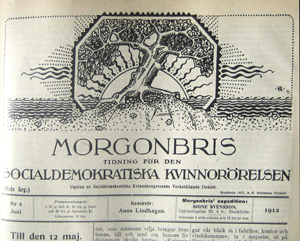
Morgonbris

Morgonbris, full title Morgonbris: arbeterskornas tidning ('Morning Breeze: Journal for working women'), is the magazine of the Social Democratic Women in Sweden.

The magazine was founded by the Women's Trade Union in 1904. The founding editors were two Swedish political activists, Anna Sterky and Maria Sandel. It is still in publication.

== See also ==
- Dagny (Swedish magazine)
- Hertha (magazine)
- Idun (magazine)
- Rösträtt för kvinnor
- Tidevarvet
- Tidskrift för hemmet
