= Maurice Kleman =

French physicist (1934–2021)

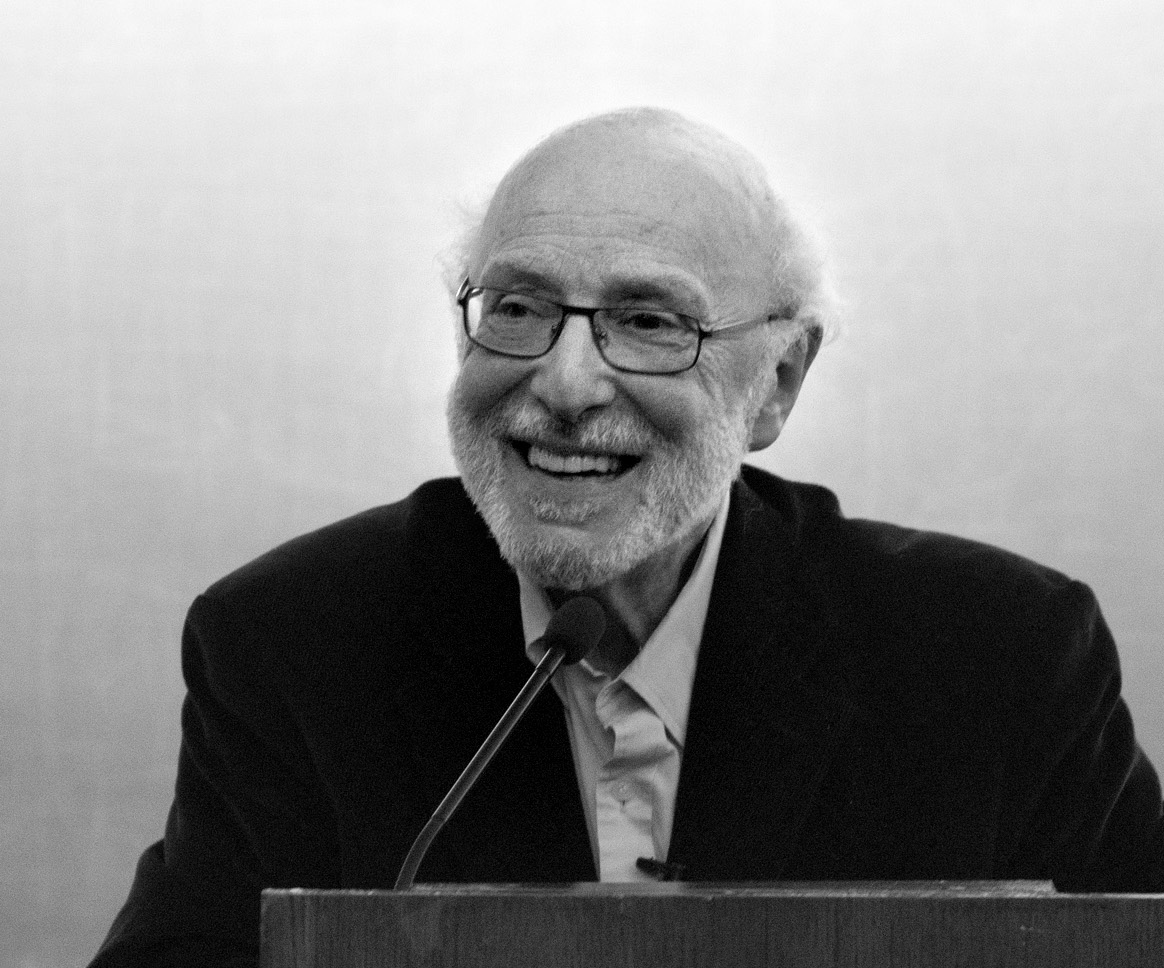
- Maurice Kleman in 2014 (courtesy of Jean-François Dars)
- Born: 11 August 1934; Paris, France
- Died: 29 January 2021 (aged 86); Paris
- Scientific career
- Fields: Physics

Maurice Kleman (alternate spelling Kléman; 11 August 1934 – 29 January 2021) was a French physicist involved in experimental and theoretical studies of the physics of defects; he has covered various fields of research, from condensed matter to heliophysics. As an author, he has been collected by libraries worldwide.

== Early life ==
Kleman was born in Paris in a family of Jewish origin which was saved from the Nazi persecutions during the Second World War by the inhabitants of the village of Le Chambon-sur-Lignon, Haute-Loire, as many other refugees were; this village is collectively honored as Righteous Among the Nations.

== Education ==
Ecole Polytechnique and Ecole des Mines de Paris; PhD under J. Friedel’s supervision on ferromagnetic thin films, at the French Iron and Steel Institute (IRSID). Postdoc at the University of Oxford.

== Career ==
Kleman belonged to the Centre National de la Recherche Scientifique (CNRS) since 1969, first as a member of the Laboratoire de Physique des Solides (LPS) in Orsay (1969-1993), which he headed from 1982 to 1984, then of the Laboratoire de Minéralogie et de Cristallographie de Paris (LMCP). He joined the Institut de Physique du Globe de Paris (IPGP) in 2010 and has been visiting professor at the Ecole polytechnique fédérale de Lausanne and at the Massachusetts Institute of Technology (MIT).

== Research ==
Kleman’s research covers many domains, in materials science (liquid crystals, quasicrystals, magnetic systems, amorphous media), more recently in heliophysics (magnetic flux ropes). In all these domains his interests are concerned with the concept of defect, in the continuation of F.C. Frank and J. Friedel. He demonstrated the role of curved crystal defects in the topology of frustrated systems. He developed with J. Friedel the concepts of continuous defects. He showed that interplanetary magnetic flux ropes can be understood as extended singularities of the vector potential.

== Awards ==
- 1975: Médaille d'argent du CNRS
- 1980: Prix de Physique Jean Ricard de la Société Française de Physique
- 2007: Grand Prix de l’Académie des Sciences (prix du CEA)
- 2018: International Honorary Member of the American Academy of Arts and Sciences.

== Books ==
- Kleman M (1983). Points, lines and walls: in liquid crystals, magnetic systems and various ordered media. Wiley. ISBN 9780471101949.
- Kleman M, Lavrentovich OD (January 2003). Soft Matter Physics, an Introduction. New York: Springer. doi:10.1007/b97416. ISBN 9780387217598.
- Kleman M (2016). Chronologie d'un physicien. Montrouge: Calvage & Mounet. ISBN 9782916352602.
