= Frida Stéenhoff =

Swedish writer and women's rights activist (1865–1945)

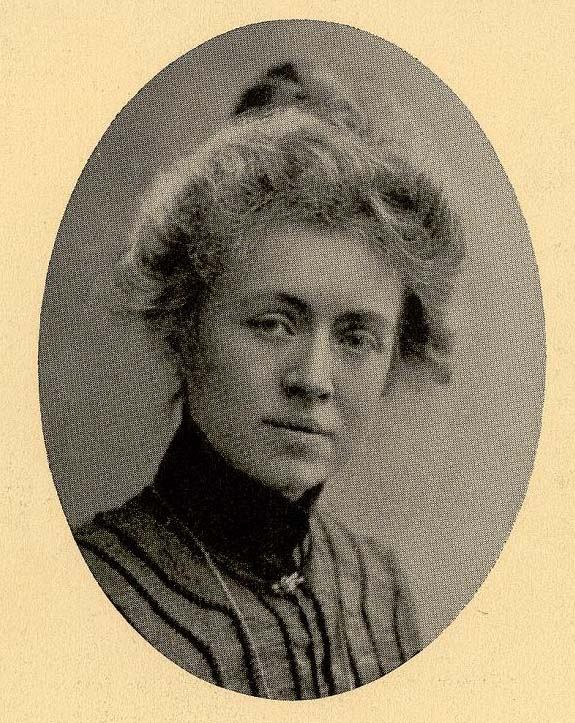
- Born: Helga Frideborg Maria Wadström; 11 December 1865; Stockholm, Sweden
- Died: 22 June 1945 (aged 79); Stockholm, Sweden
- Other name: Harold Gote
- Occupations: Writer, feminist
- Spouse: Gotthilf Johan Vilhelm Stéenhoff (m. 1887; died 1943)
- Relatives: Ellen Hagen (sister); Tord Hagen (nephew)

Helga Frideborg Maria "Frida" Stéenhoff (née Wadström; 11 December 1865 – 22 June 1945) was a Swedish writer and women's rights activist. She was a leading participant of the public debate of gender equality and a contributor of several radical progressive publications. She was engaged in the women suffrage movement and several humanitarian organisations.

== Life ==
Frida Wadström was born to the chaplain Carl Bernhard Philonegros Wadström (1831–1918) and Helga Westdahl (1838–1879), and was the sister of the suffragist and writer Ellen Hagen. In 1887 she married the physician Gotthilf Stéenhoff.

During World War II, she participated in anti-fascist work. Stéenhoff was a leading central figure of the free love movement in Sweden, for birth control, sex and romance without marriage, and critical toward the institution of marriage, subjects for which she became controversially known by her debut novel: Lejonets unge (Lion's Child) from 1896. She is credited with having introduced the modern concept of feminism in Sweden with her publication Feminismens moral (Feminist Morality) from 1903.

She used the male pseudonym Harald Gate. She was among the contributors to the feminist magazine Tidevarvet.

== Works ==
=== Novels and serials ===
- 1902 - Det heliga arvet
- 1904 - Öknen
- 1911 - Kring den heliga elden
- 1915 - Ljusa bragder och mörka dåd
- 1918 - Filippas öden
- 1937 - Objektiv stats- och könsmoral

=== Plays ===
- 1896 - Lejonets unge
- 1898 - Sin nästas hustru
- 1900 - Ärkefienden
- 1907 - Stridbar ungdom
- 1908 - Den vita duvans samfund
- 1910 - Den smala vägen
- 1911 - Kärlekens rival

=== Essays and other publications ===
- 1903 - Feminismens moral
- 1904 - Den reglementerade prostitutionen
- 1905 - Humanitet och barnalstring
- 1905 - Varför skola kvinnorna vänta
- 1907 - Fosterlandskänslan
- 1908 - Penningen och kärleken
- 1909 - Riktlinjerna i mitt författaskap
- 1910 - Teatern och livet
- 1910 - Det nya folket
- 1912 - Minfru, fru eller fröken
- 1912 - Äktenskap och demokrati
- 1913 - Könsslaveri
- 1915 - Krigets herrar - världens herrar
- 1924 - Samtal med en borgmästare om prostitutionen (Tidevarvet 1924(2):8, s. 4, 5, 6)
- 1924 - Ellen Key och Nikodemus (Tidevarvet 1924(2):49, s. 1, 6)
- 1925 - Babels förbistring: angående befolkningsproblem ... (Tidevarvet 1925(3):7, s. 3)
- 1925 - Bör nutidsmänniskan tro på drömmar? (Tidevarvet 1925(3):14, s. 4)
- 1925 - Vad unnar han henne? (Tidevarvet 1925(3):17, s. 4 )
- 2007 - Blott ett annat namn för ljus: Tre texter av Frida Stéenhoff (innehåller Feminismens moral, Ett sällsamt öde och Lejonets unge)

== See also ==
- Alfhild Agrell
- Agnes von Krusenstjerna
- Sedlighetsdebatten
