= Stockholms-Tidningen =

Swedish daily newspaper (1889–1984)

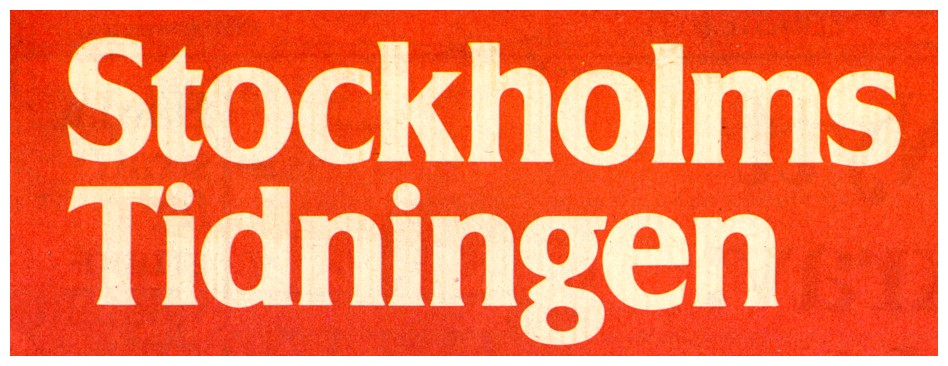
- Type: Daily newspaper
- Founder: Anders Jeurling
- Founded: 1889
- Ceased publication: 1984
- Political alignment: Social democrat
- Language: Swedish
- Headquarters: Stockholm
- Country: Sweden

Stockholms-Tidningen (lit. 'The Stockholm Times') was a Swedish-language morning newspaper published in Stockholm, Sweden, between 1889 and 1984 with an interruption from 1966 to 1981. It was one of the major dailies in the country together with Dagens Nyheter and Aftonbladet in the 1960s.

== History and profile ==
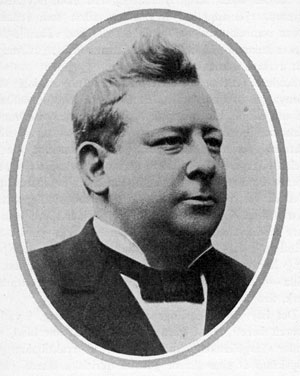
Anders Jeurling, founder of Stockholms-Tidningen

Stockholms-Tidningen was established by Anders Jeurling in 1889. The paper was based in Stockholm. During its early stage, it had three editions: morning edition, evening edition and provincial edition. However, in 1890 only two editions continued.

To gain larger readership, the price of Stockholms-Tidningen was kept low, and its content included popular and concentrated news. The paper sold 10,000 copies in 1890 and 42,000 copies in 1894. It achieved a daily circulation of more than 100,000 copies in 1900, becoming the first Swedish newspaper which exceeded that amount of circulation. It was also the first mass-circulation newspaper in the country. The paper kept its high circulation levels in the 1920s.

On 19 September 1931, Stockholms Dagblad merged with Stockholms-Tidningen. The paper along with Stockholms Dagblad, Svenska Dagbladet and Aftonbladet was purchased by Torsten Kreuger. Therefore, he became the owner of Stockholms-Tidningen and Aftonbladet in 1932. Both papers supported the Liberal Party under the ownership of Kreuger until 1956 when he sold them to the Swedish Trade Union Confederation.

Upon the ownership change Stockholms-Tidningen became a supporter of social democratic stance. E. B. Rinman, Sven O. Andersson and Anders Johansson are among the former editors-in-chief of the daily. Else Kleen published fashion-related articles in the paper from the 1910s to the 1950s under the pen name of Gwen. Her articles were featured in the Sunday supplement of the paper. The paper also contained frequent film reviews.

Victor Vinde, editor-in-chief of the paper, was fired in 1965. In 1966, just before its first closure, Stockholms-Tidningen switched its format to tabloid to increase its circulation, and Gunnar Fredriksson was appointed the editor-in-chief. However, these changes did not work, and the paper ceased publication on 27 February 1966.

In October 1981 Stockholms-Tidningen was relaunched and was owned by the Social Democratic Party. However, it was closed down in 1984.
