= Ellen Hagen =

Swedish suffragette and activist

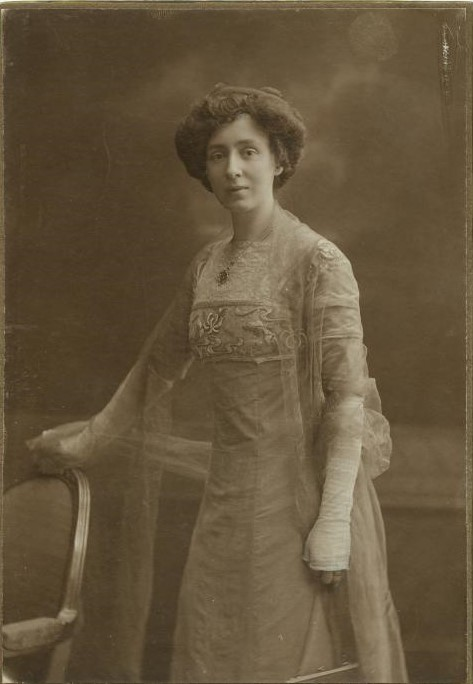
- Hagen in 1913
- Born: Ellen Helga Louise Wadström; 15 September 1873; Stockholm, Sweden
- Died: 28 January 1967 (aged 93); Stockholm, Sweden
- Occupation: Activist
- Spouse: Robert Hagen (m. 1896; died 1922)
- Children: 2, including Tord Hagen
- Relatives: Frida Stéenhoff (sister)

Ellen Helga Louise Hagen (née Wadström; 15 September 1873 – 28 January 1967) was a Swedish suffragette, women's rights activist and politician. She was a member of the National Association for Women's Suffrage, the chairperson of Liberala kvinnor (Liberal Women) in 1938–1946 and Svenska Kvinnors Medborgarförbund (Swedish Women's Citizen Society) in 1936–1963. During the 1920s and 1930s, she was internationally active within peace work and the Swedish delegate in the international peace conference in Paris in 1931.

== Life ==
Hagen was born on 15 September 1873 in Stockholm, Sweden. She was the daughter of the priest and writer Bernhard Wadström and Helga Westdahl (1838–1879), and the sister of the writer Frida Stéenhoff. In 1896, she married Roger Hagen, governor of Gävleborg County. She was the mother of ambassador Tord Hagen.

She was active as a speaker for Country Association for Women's Suffrage. She is described as a skillful speaker, and her contribution was appreciated: by her connections, the movement gained supporters from the upper class, who would not otherwise be willing to listen to a speech about women suffrage, and by her glamorous way of dressing, she proved wrong the caricature of a suffragette as "masculine". Women suffrage was achieved in 1919.

After the death of her spouse in 1922, she was proposed by the government to succeed him as governor of Gävleborg County, though this did not come about. In 1923, she became the launching editor of a Swedish liberal feminist magazine, Tidevarvet.

Hagen died on 28 January 1967 in Stockholm.
