= Idun (magazine) =

Swedish magazine

- Title page of the 1910 Christmas issue
- Frequency: Weekly
- Founder: Frithiof Hellberg and C. E. Gernandt
- First issue: 1887; 139 years ago
- Final issue: 1963 (merged with Vecko-Journalen)
- Country: Sweden
- Based in: Stockholm
- Language: Swedish

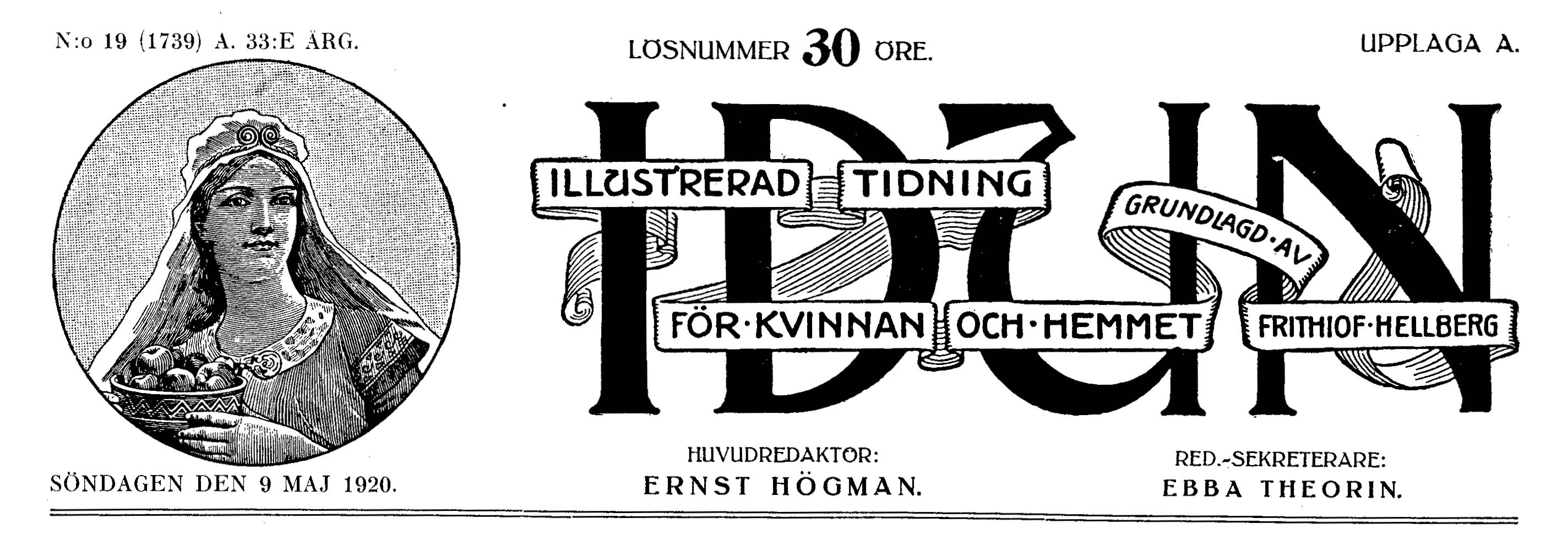
Idun masthead

Idun was a Swedish magazine for women published in Sweden from 1887 to 1963. It was named after the goddess Idun in Norse mythology, who appears with her basket of apples on its masthead. Idun's target audience was always the educated woman of the bourgeois family, initially aimed at women in the home. Around 1900, its focus changed from being a practical housewife's weekly, to featuring more cultural news, coverage of The Womens Question and women’s suffrage.

== History and profile ==
Idun was founded by newspaper man Frithiof Hellberg and C. E. Gernandt in 1887. The subtitle of the magazine was "A Practical Weekly Magazine for Women and the Home".

Idun was one of the first women's magazines in Sweden. Hellberg was the editor and publisher until 1906. The weekly Idun was originally a "practical weekly for women and the home", covering practical domestic topics such as sewing and cooking. Its content later took on a more general character, with reportage, opinion pieces and extensive fictional features. Fashion was one of the topics covered, and Idun was one of the first weekly magazines to give fashion a more prominent place for the first time in a mixed publication. (Swedish fashion magazines had existed long for some time).

Idun focused on literature and gender equality. Several poems were also published in the magazine.

The magazine merged with Åhlén & Åkerlunds's Vecko-Journalen in 1963. The merged magazine was published weekly under the double-barrelled name Idun-Veckojournalen. In 1980, falling circulation figures forced it to a monthly cycle, and it was renamed Månadsjournalen (meaning 'Monthly Record' in English). The magazine ceased publication in 2002.

== See also ==
- Dagny (Swedish magazine)
- Hertha (magazine)
- Morgonbris
- Rösträtt för kvinnor
- Tidevarvet
- Tidskrift för hemmet
