= Klara Johanson =

Swedish literary critic and essayist

Klara Elisabeth Johanson
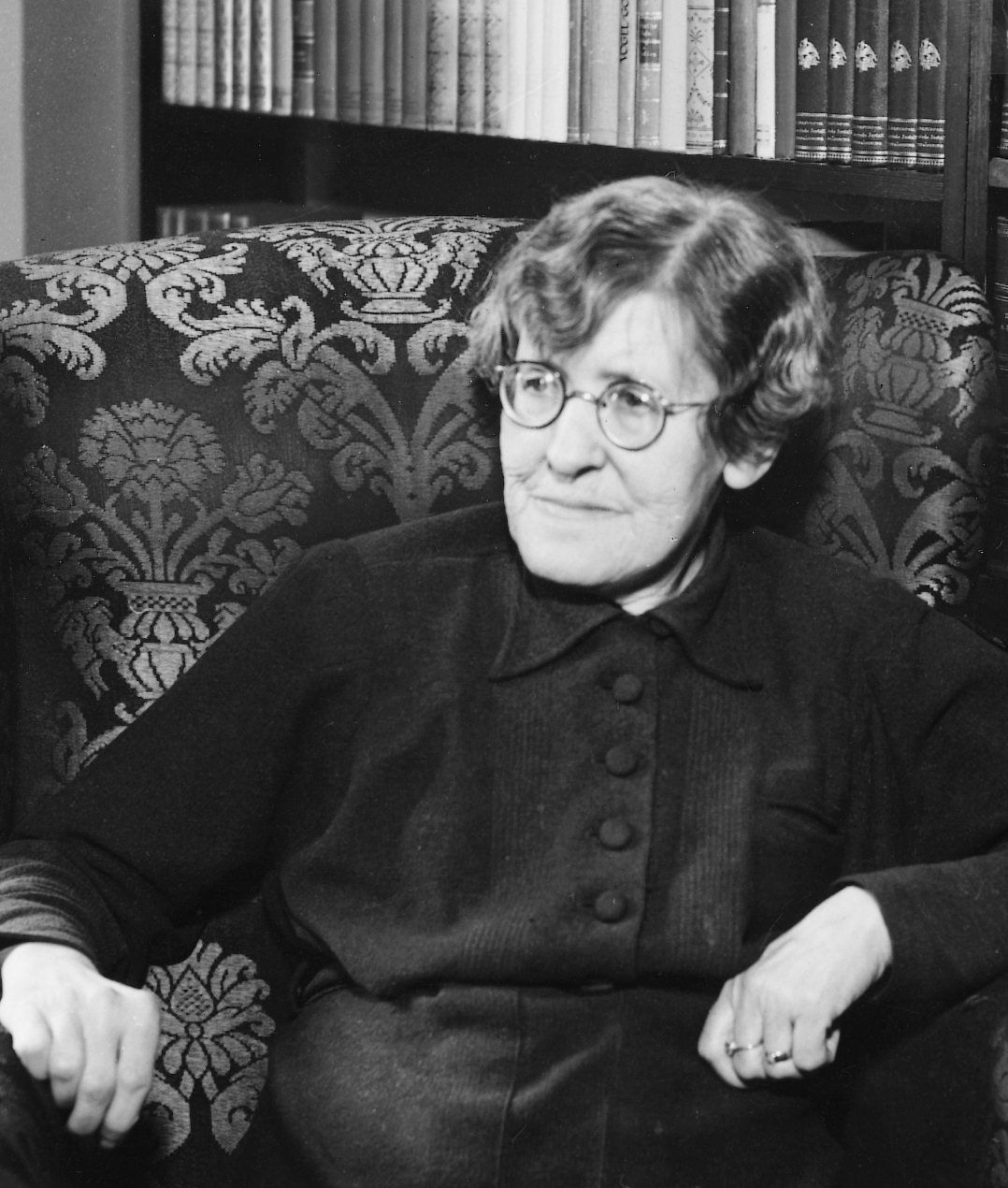
- Born: October 6, 1875; Halmstad, Sweden
- Died: October 8, 1948 (aged 73)
- Resting place: Solna Cemetery
- Education: Uppsala University (MA)
- Occupations: Literary critic, essayist

Klara Elisabeth Johanson (6 October 1875 – 8 October 1948) was a Swedish literary critic and essayist. She was unusually well educated for a woman in her city. She initially wrote for journals and newspapers before she and her partner spent five years curating the correspondence of Fredrika Bremer. She is known for introducing American writers in parallel to publishing her own books.

== Biography ==
Klara Johanson was born in 1875 in Halmstad to Alexander Johanson, a milliner and furrier, and Anna Christina Johanson. She was the first woman from Halmstad to sit the upper secondary school final examinations, passing in 1894. She went on to study a Master of Arts in humanities at Uppsala University and graduated in 1897. She then moved to Stockholm and became a sub-editor for Dagny, the journal of the women's rights organisation the Fredrika Bremer Association. In 1901 she left Dagny to write for Stockholms Dagblad, contributing literary criticism under her own name and humorous stories under the name Huck Leber. She wrote for the newspaper until 1912; during this period, The History of Nordic Women's Literature notes that Johanson "was described as Sweden's most eloquent critic with the highest aesthetic sensitivity".

In 1907 Johanson edited Den undre världen, a diary written by a prostitute which proved to be controversial. She and her romantic partner Ellen Kleman published the letters of Fredrika Bremer in four volumes, titled Fredrika Bremers brev, between 1915 and 1920. In 1924, Johanson and Kleman met another couple, sculptor Sigrid Fridman and her partner, Ragnhild Barkman. The four women became friends, often spending their summers together. Johanson would later write a book regarding her friend, Fridman. Johanson is also credited with promoting American literature to Swedish readers; notes from Johanson's diary published in 1916 contain the first known mention of Emily Dickinson in Swedish print, although this has also been attributed to Margit Abenius, who wrote about Dickinson in 1934. She translated the works of several other writers, including Henri-Frédéric Amiel's Fragments d'un journal intime and Rosa Mayreder's Geschlecht und Kultur.

Johanson published books of essays, mainly pertaining to literature: En recensents baktankar (1928), Det speglade livet (1926), Det rika stärbhuset (1946) and Sigrid Fridman – och andra konstnärer (1948). After her death in 1948, Nils Afzelius published three collections of Johanson's writing: K. J. själv (1952, childhood memories), Brev (1953, letters) and Kritik (1957, criticism).
