= Social Democratic Women in Sweden =

- Sveriges socialdemokratiska kvinnoförbund
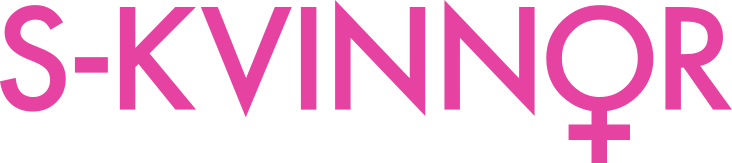
- Formation: 1920
- Type: Women's wing
- Headquarters: Stockholm, Sweden
- Official language: Swedish
- Chairperson: Annika Strandhäll
- Parent organization: Swedish Social Democratic Party
- Affiliations: Swedish Social Democratic Party
- Website: https://s-kvinnor.se/

The Social Democratic Women in Sweden (Swedish: Sveriges socialdemokratiska kvinnoförbund [ˈsvæ̌rjɛs sʊsɪˈɑ̂ːldɛmʊˌkrɑːtɪska ˈkvɪ̂nːʊfœrˌbɵnd]), or simply "S-women" (S-kvinnor [ˈɛ̂sːˌkvɪnːʊr]), is the women's wing of the Swedish Social Democratic Party.

It was established in 1920 by representatives from 120 local Social Democratic women’s clubs from all over Sweden. At the time of its foundation, there had been local women's clubs of the Party since the foundation of the Stockholms allmänna kvinnoklubb in 1892, but there was no national women's club. The most important reason for the funding of a national women’s league was to promote and activate women politically, as well as to acquire access to power and provide a political power base for women.

Its chairperson, since October 2021, is Annika Strandhäll.

== Chairpersons ==
- Signe Vessman, 1920–1936
- Disa Västberg, 1936–1952
- Inga Thorsson, 1952–1964
- Lisa Mattson, 1964–1981
- Maj-Lis Lööw, 1981–1990
- Margareta Winberg, 1990–1995
- Inger Segelström, 1995–2003
- Nalin Pekgul, 2003–2011
- Lena Sommestad, 2011–2013
- Carina Ohlsson, 2013–2021
- Annika Strandhäll, 2021–present

== See also ==
- Stockholms allmänna kvinnoklubb
