= Gothenburg University Library =

Academic library in Gothenburg, Sweden

- Göteborgs universitetsbibliotek
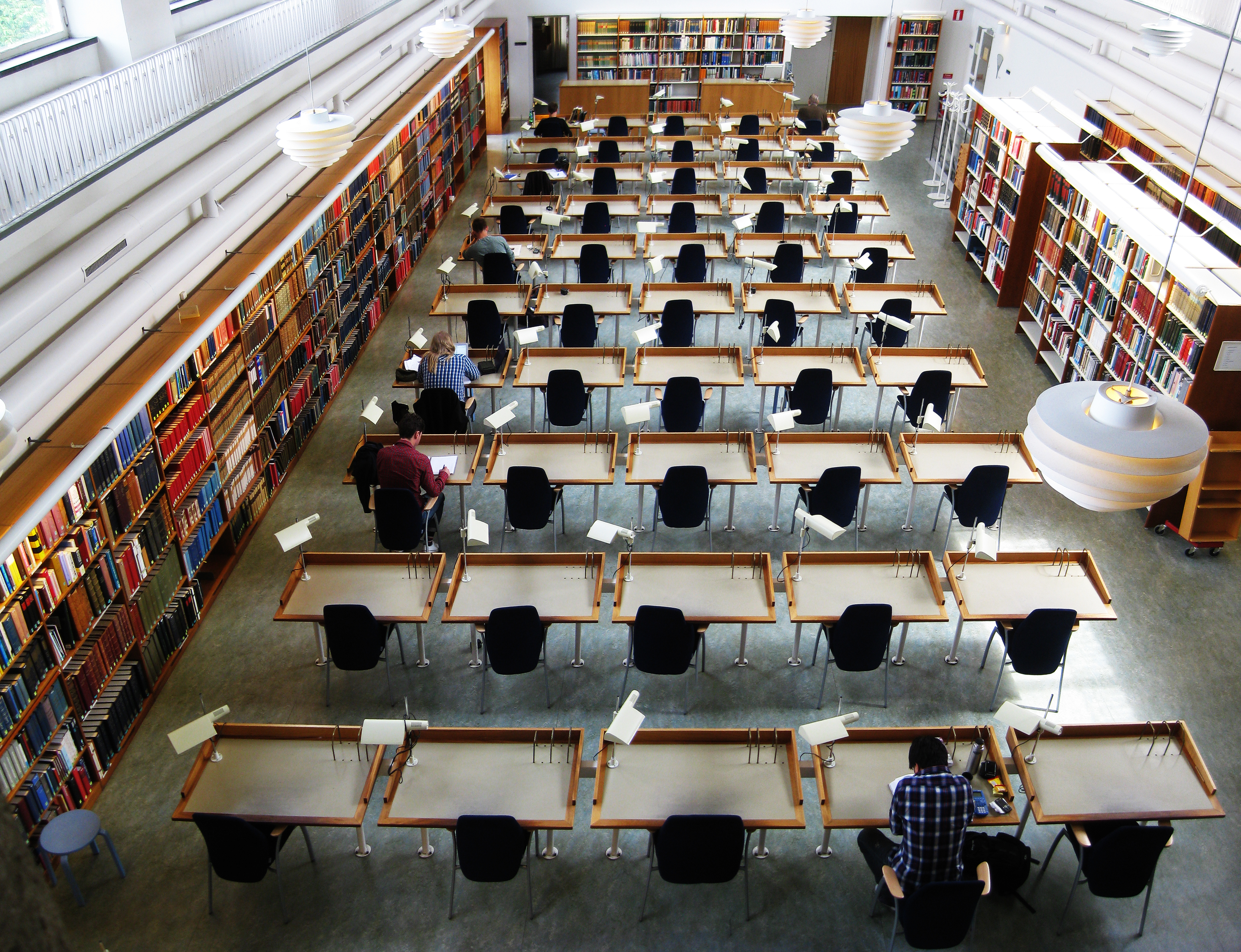
- Reading room in the main library
- 57.69555°N 11.98529°E
- Location: Gothenburg, Sweden, Sweden
- Type: State Library; Academic library; EDC Library
- Established: 1850s
- Branch of: University of Gothenburg
- Branches: 10

Other information
- Website: www.ub.gu.se

The Gothenburg University Library (Swedish: Göteborgs universitetsbibliotek) consists of ten separate libraries in Gothenburg, Sweden, including Learning Resource Centres. With 1.6 million visits per year, the library is one of the most frequented research libraries in Sweden. It is a meeting place for students, teachers and researchers at the University of Gothenburg as well as the public. The library is also a cultural institution for the people of Gothenburg. The library houses the KvinnSam – National resource library for gender studies.

== History ==
The Gothenburg University Library, was originally known as the "Gothenburg Museum Library, Gothenburg University Library and Gothenburg City Library" (Göteborgs musei, Göteborgs högskolas bibliotek och Göteborgs stadsbibliotek). It is an academic library and the main library for the University of Gothenburg. The largest of its libraries is situated at Renströmsparken behind Götaplatsen in Gothenburg.

=== 1800s ===
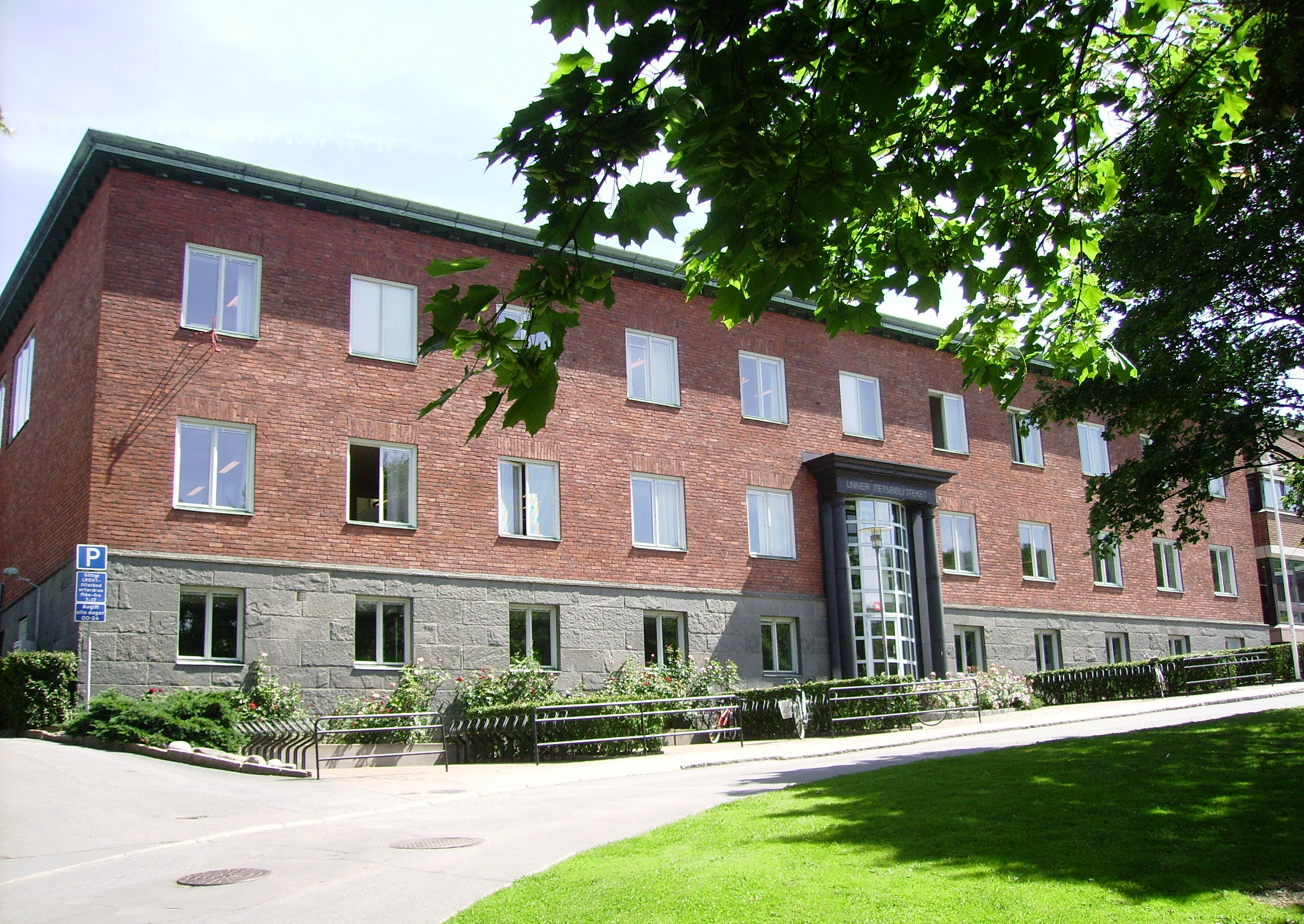
The original library building

The foundation for the library was laid early through donations. During the end of the 1850s, the institution that later became known as the Gothenburg Natural History Museum, had assembled a museum library in a gallery on the top floor of the east wing in the original building. The collection contained about 1,000 volumes, that had been bequeathed to the museum in 1844, by the physician to the Royal Court of Sweden Johan P Westring, another 500 books were donated from the Royal Society of Sciences and Letters in Gothenburg and finally 300 books came from the library of the County Agricultural Society. When the Gothenburg Museum (later included in the Gothenburg City Museum) was inaugurated on 20 December 1861, the collections were moved there.

The only money the library received during the first years, was an annual grant of 500 SEK from the museum. The grant was increased to 700 SEK in 1870. Through a grants from the Renström Dividend Fund on three occasions, 10,000 SEK in 1871, 25,000 SEK in 1878 and 25,000 SEK in 1885, it was possible for the library to increase the book collection according to plan.

In 1863, the size of the collection was estimated to 5,000 volumes, 10,000 in 1869, close to 30,000 in 1879 and approximately 50,000 in 1886. In 1891, the museum library was merged with the book collections belonging to the newly founded Gothenburg Institute (Göteborgs högskola), the predecessor to the University of Gothenburg, under the name of Gothenburg City Library (Göteborgs stadsbibliotek).

=== 1900s ===
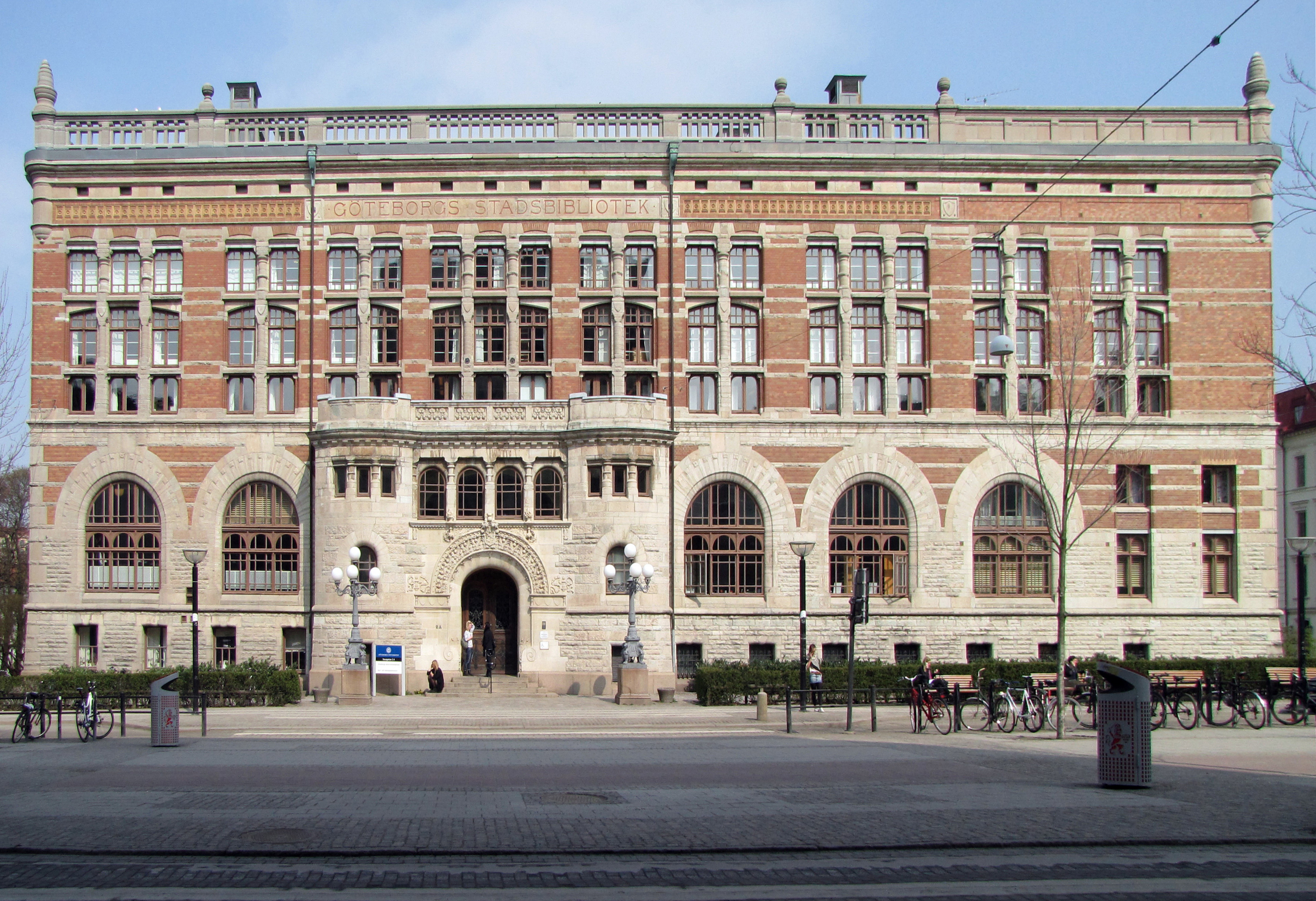
The Library for Social Studies, formerly known as the Literature and Journals Library

A new building for the Gothenburg City Library was inaugurated on 6 October 1900, at Haga kyrkoplan. In 1995, this was to become the Literature and Journals Library, its primary function was to supply literature for the Gothenburg Institution. The name of the library was changed to Library for Social Studies in 2013. The current Gothenburg City Library originates from the Dickson Public Library (Dicksonska folkbiblioteket), it got its present name in 1967, when the library moved to a building at Götaplatsen.

When the State Medical University of Gothenburg was formed in 1948, the Gothenburg City Library got a section for medical literature on 1 July 1948, financed by the Swedish government. The Gothenburg Institute and the Medical University were merged in 1954, to form the State University of Gothenburg. The City Library, which remained under the management of the Gothenburg Municipality, vacated the premises at Haga kyrkoplan the same year and moved to Renströmsgatan 4 at Näckrosdammen. The new premises were opened on 14 June 1954, and officially inaugurated on 1 September.

The buildings consists of the foundations of an older complex, The Memorial (Minneshallen), which was built for the Gothenburg Tercentennial Jubilee Exposition in 1923, and a new part designed by architect Ärland Noreen. The building of the new part started in 1951 and continued until April 1954, when the move, which took 64 days, started. The cost for the build was 5,246,000 SEK. The halls of the library had 48,700 m (159,800 ft) of shelves, the books occupied some 18,900 m (62,000 ft) of these. An extension to the library was added in 1984. The extension was designed by the architect company Coordinator.

=== Library institution ===
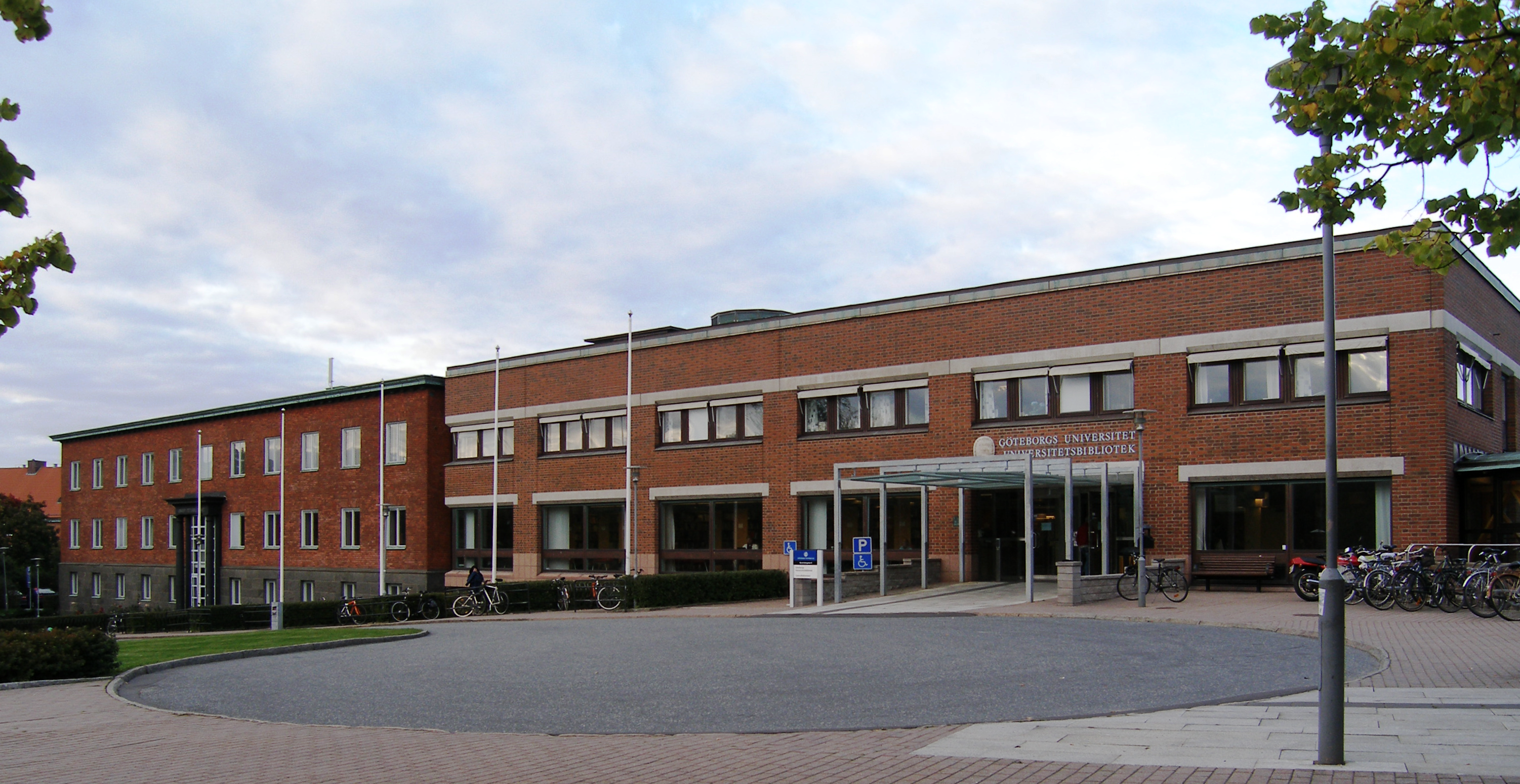
The Humanities Library, adjacent to the Faculty of Humanities

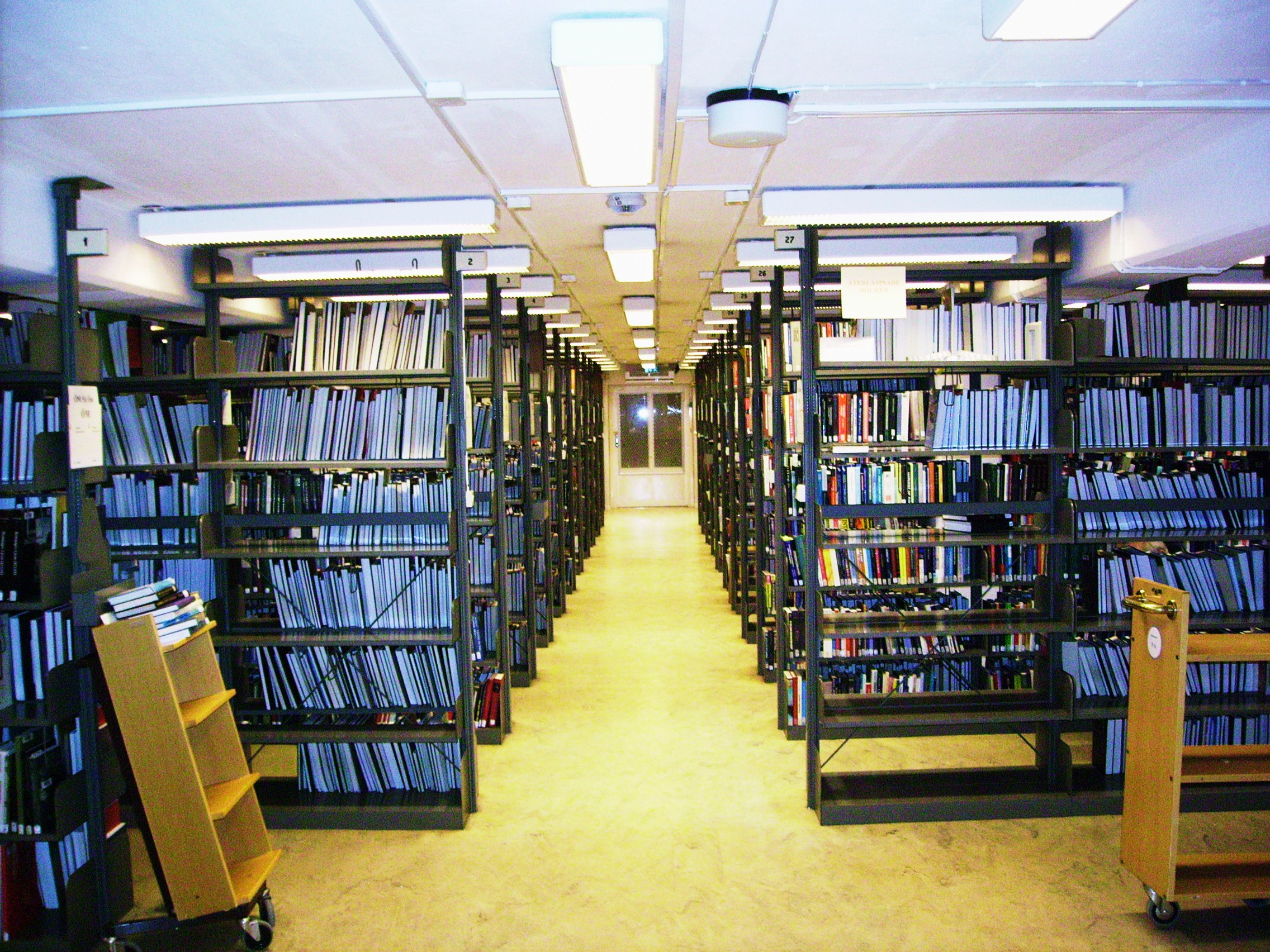
Shelves in the main library

On 1 January 1961, the library became a State Institution under the name of Gothenburg University Library (Göteborgs universitetsbibliotek). At the same time, the library's function was split into two sections: the public and the biomedical. The latter later moved to a separate building at Medicinaregatan 4 in Änggården. The biomedical library was designed by architect Klas Anshelm.

The libraries belonging the Gothenburg University Library are:

- Library for Music and Drama (Biblioteket för musik och dramatik)
- Biomedical Library (Biomedicinska biblioteket)
- Humanities Library (Humanistiska biblioteket)
- Library of Economics (Ekonomiska biblioteket)
- Library of Geolocical Science (Geovetenskapliga biblioteket)
- Art Library (Konstbiblioteket)
- Library of Education (Pedagogiska biblioteket)
- Library for Social Studies (Samhällsvetenskapliga biblioteket)
- Hälsovetarbacken Library (Hälsovetarbackens bibliotek)

== Library of Economics ==
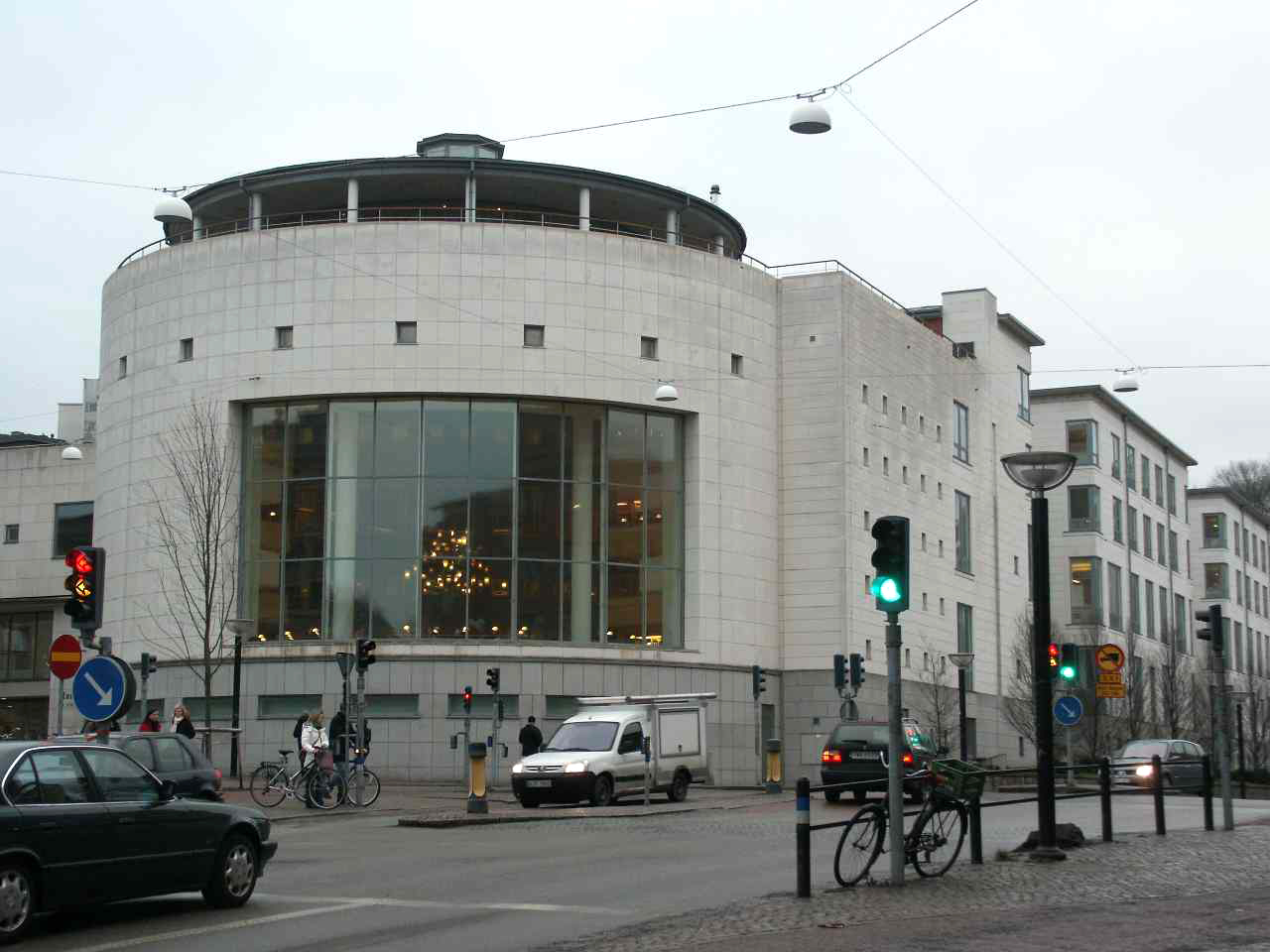
The Library of Economics

The focus of the Library of Economics are the areas of the Gothenburg School of Business, Economics and Law: business administration, economics, human geography, economic history, law and statistics.

The library is an EDC Library (European Documentation Centre) and therefore receives the most important EU publications. Aside from this collection, the library also have a large collection of statistics and is a so-called depot library for material from the United Nations. Much of these publications are now stored in databases.

The present library was designed by the architect company Erséus, Frenning & Sjögren Arkitekter. In the library is a reading room with a large, curved window facing the Vasagatan, the room has a chandelier designed by artist Gunnel Sahlin. The library was first housed in premises at Vasagatan 3, also in the same house as the School of Business, Economics and Law. The reading room there only had 44 places, whereas the new one has 400 places.

The library got its present name in 1971, when the School of Business, Economics and Law was merged with the university and following the adding of its book collections to the University Library in 1969.

== See also ==
- List of libraries in Sweden
