= Emilia Fogelklou =

Swedish pacifist, theologian, feminist, author and lecturer (1878–1972)

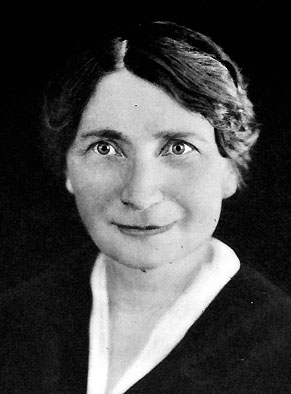
- Emilia Fogelklou in the 1930s.
- Born: July 20, 1878; Simrishamn, Sweden
- Died: February 26, 1972 (aged 93); Uppsala, Sweden
- Occupations: Theologian, Writer
- Writing career
- Language: Swedish

Emilia Maria Fogelklou-Norlind (20 July 1878 in Simrishamn – 26 September 1972 in Uppsala, Sweden) was a Swedish pacifist, theologian, feminist, author and lecturer. She was the first woman in Sweden to receive a bachelor’s degree in theology, and her written work spans 28 published books.

== Biography ==
The daughter of a district registrar, Emilia Fogelklou excelled as a student. After attending Kungliga Högre Lärarinneseminariet, she became a teacher in Gothenburg and began to write, initially about religious education. She was involved in the workers education movement and wrote for progressive education reform. In 1909, she became the first woman in Sweden to receive a degree in theology.

In 1915, Fogelklou attended the women’s peace conference at the Hague. She became an early member of the Women’s International League for Peace and Freedom, and went on to contribute to the liberal feminist magazine Tidvarvet. Her commitment to international peace would later see her work with Service Civil International, after World War II.

At the age of 52, Fogelklou received the Sweden-America Foundation’s Zorn scholarship, which allowed her to study sociology and psychology at New York and Chicago. She lectured on these subjects upon her return to Sweden, but her career in education received a blow in 1938, when she was denied a professorship at Uppsala. However, in 1941 she became the first woman to be awarded an honorary doctorate in theology.

Although described as one who made friends easily, Fogelklou suffered from bouts of depression. At the age of twenty-four, she experienced a spiritual epiphany that saved her from the brink of suicide. In 1922, she married Arnold Norlind, a geographer who shared her spiritual outlook. The marriage was a happy one, but short lived – Norlind succumbed to tuberculosis in 1929. Two year later, Fogelklou became one of the first Quakers in Sweden, joining the Society of Friends in 1931.

Emilia Fogelklou died in 1972. She is buried in Västra Alstad cemetery in Anderslov parish, Skåne County. Her epitaph reads: ‘There is light still’.

== Bibliography ==
- Allvarstunder (1903)
- Om religionsundervisningen (1904)
- Frans af Assisi (1907)
- Medan gräset gror (1911)
- Förkunnare (1915)
- Från hövdingen till den törnkrönte (1916)
- Från längtansvägarna (1916)
- Ur fromhetslivets svensk-historia (1917)
- Icke i trötthetens tecken (1918)
- Birgitta (1919)
- Ur historiens verkstad (1919)
- Religionsundervisningen än en gång (1919)
- Protestant och katolik (1919)
- Från själens vägar (1920)
- Apostlagärningarna (1922)
- Så ock på jorden (1923)
- Människoskolan (1924)
- Vila och arbete jämte andra föredrag i praktisk psykologi (1924)
- Befriaren i högtidssägner och bilder (1925)
- Samhällstyper och medborgarideal (1926)
- Människan och hennes arbete i psykologisk-historisk belysning (1926)
- Emilia Fogelklous böcker (1926)
- Kväkaren James Nayler (1929)
- Samarbetets psykologi och förvärvslivets (1929)
- Den allra vanligaste människan (1931)
- Om den psykiska hälsovårdens mål och medel (1932)
- Vad man tror och tänker inom svenska folkrörelser (1934)
- William Penn (1935)
- Psykiska faktorer i samband med frågan om krig eller fred (1937)
- Två föredrag vid 35-årsfesten i Göteborgs högre samskola den 31 oktober 1936, (1937)
- Små handböcker för kristendomsundervisningen i folkskolan (1939)
- Bortom Birgitta (1941)
- Tror vi på det goda? (1942)
- Hat och människomekanisering (1943)
- Arnold (1944)
- Barhuvad (1950)
- Helgon och häxor (1952)
- På backen (1952)
- Resfärdig (1954)
- Form och strålning (1958)
- Minnesbilder och ärenden (1963)
- Brev till vännerna (1979)
- Kära Ili, käraste Elin (1988)

== Awards ==
- De Nios stora pris 1932
