= Stockholms Dagblad =

Newspaper published in Stockholm, Sweden

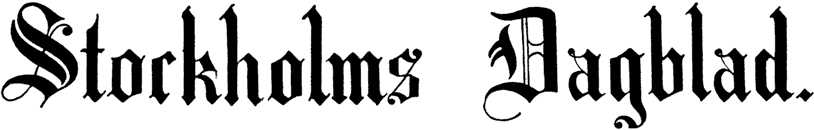
- Type: Daily newspaper
- Format: Tabloid
- Founded: 2 January 1824
- Ceased publication: 19 September 1931
- Political alignment: Conservative right-wing
- Language: Swedish
- Headquarters: Stockholm, Sweden

Stockholms Dagblad was a conservative morning newspaper published in Stockholm between 1824 and 1931.

== History and profile ==
Stockholms Dagblad was established on 2 January 1824 as a newspaper for the Swedish capital. Under the editorship of Jonas Adolf Walldén, the newspaper developed into a content-rich paper chiefly designated for news. In the 1870s, the editor-in-chief Vilhelm Walldén transformed Stockholms Dagblad into one of Sweden's most influential newspapers. The paper was one of the right-wing publications in Stockholm.

In 1884, Stockholms Dagblad was purchased by a consortium consisting of Elis Fischer, Gustaf Holm, Axel Lundvall and Axel Weinberg.

Stockholms Dagblad was in the latter half of the 1920s converted into the tabloid newspaper format, the first among Swedish newspapers in this respect. The last issue was published on 19 September 1931 and then, the newspaper was merged with Stockholms-Tidningen.
