= Tidevarvet =

Weekly political magazine in Sweden (1923–1936)

- Categories: Political magazine
- Frequency: Weekly
- Founded: 1923
- First issue: 24 November 1923
- Final issue: November 1936
- Country: Sweden
- Based in: Stockholm
- Language: Swedish

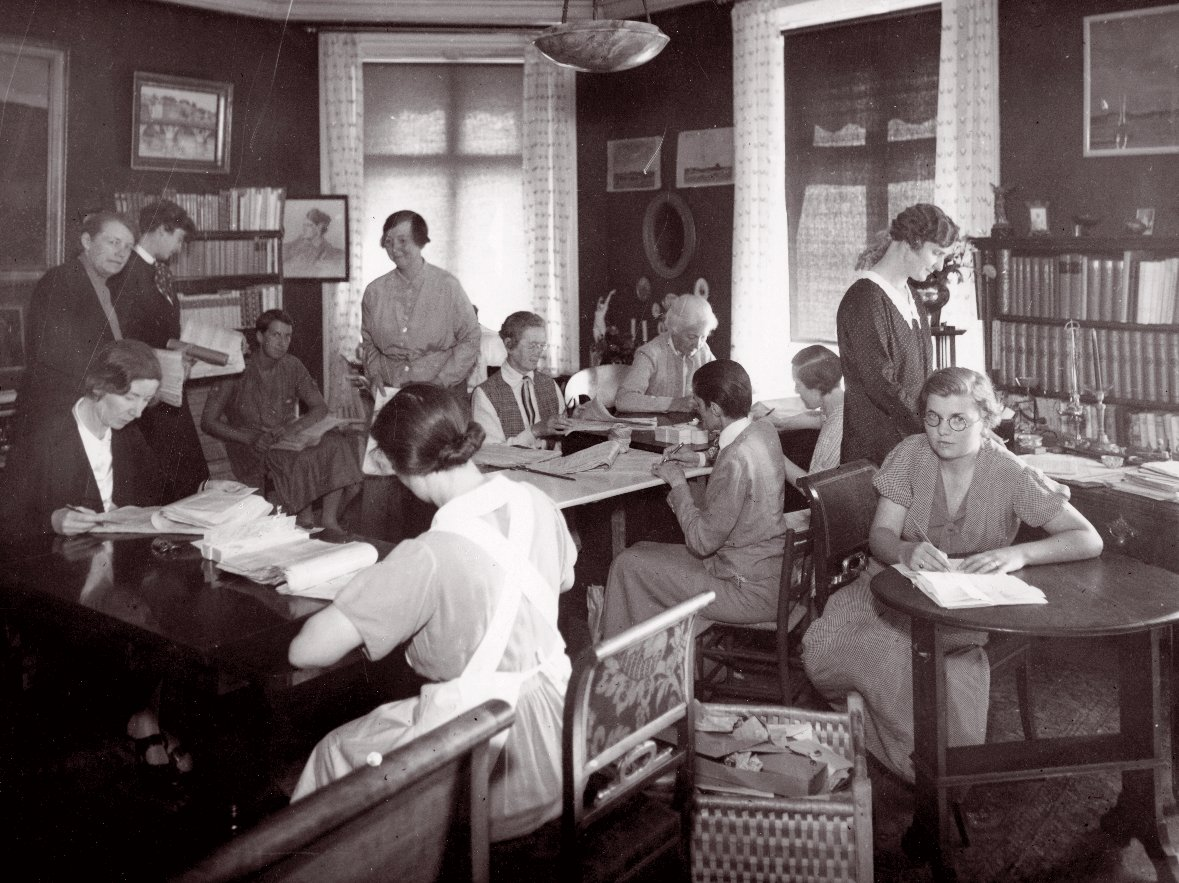
Tidevarvets editorial office in 1935

Tidevarvet (Swedish: The Epoch) was a weekly political and feminist magazine existed between November 1923 and December 1936 in Stockholm, Sweden.

== History and profile ==
Tidevarvet was established in 1923. The first issue appeared on 24 November 1923. The founders were five women, who were called the Fogelstad group: Kerstin Hesselgren, Honorine Hermelin, who was an educator, Ada Nilsson, who was a medical doctor, Elisabeth Tamm, a politician, and Elin Wägner, who was an author. The founders had a liberal political stance. It was started on the initiatives of the Liberal Women's National Association, which was also established by the group.

Tidevarvet stated its mission in the first issue as follows: the magazine would be a “forum, an arena in which men and women can work side by side to forge a broad-minded vision and find ways of implementing it in legislation and community life.” The magazine was published on a weekly basis. It adopted a radical political and pacifist stance. Elisabeth Tamm subsidised the magazine. Tidevarvet ceased publication in December 1936.

== Editors, contributors and content ==
The launching editor of the magazine was Ellen Hagen whose term was between 1923 and 1924. Then, Elin Wägner edited Tidevarvet from 1924 to 1927. She was replaced by Carin Hermelin in the post who edited Tidevarvet from 1927 to its demise in 1936.

Honorine Hermelin and Moa Martinson were among the contributors. The latter published notes about her visit to the Soviet Union in the magazine, which continued to be an influential platform to discuss social and women-related issues in Sweden until 1935. Ada Nilsson also worked in the magazine. The other significant contributors included Eva Andén, Emilia Fogelklou, Klara Johansson, Frida Steenhoff and Ellen Key.

Although Tidevarvet was a feminist publication, it did not publish specific issues on women arguing that all areas of society were concerned with women. In addition to political content, the magazine frequently featured articles about physical training and sports. These were mostly written by a medical doctor and political activist Andrea Andreen, with numerous contributions by Ragnvi Torslow-Lundgren. The magazine invited its readers to join the activities of the Svenska kvinnors centralförbund för fysisk kultur (Swedish Women's Federation for Physical Culture).

== Legacy ==
Hjördis Levin published a book about the magazine and its contributors, Kvinnorna på barrikaden (Swedish: Women on the Barricade).
