= Gurli Linder =

Swedish writer and feminist

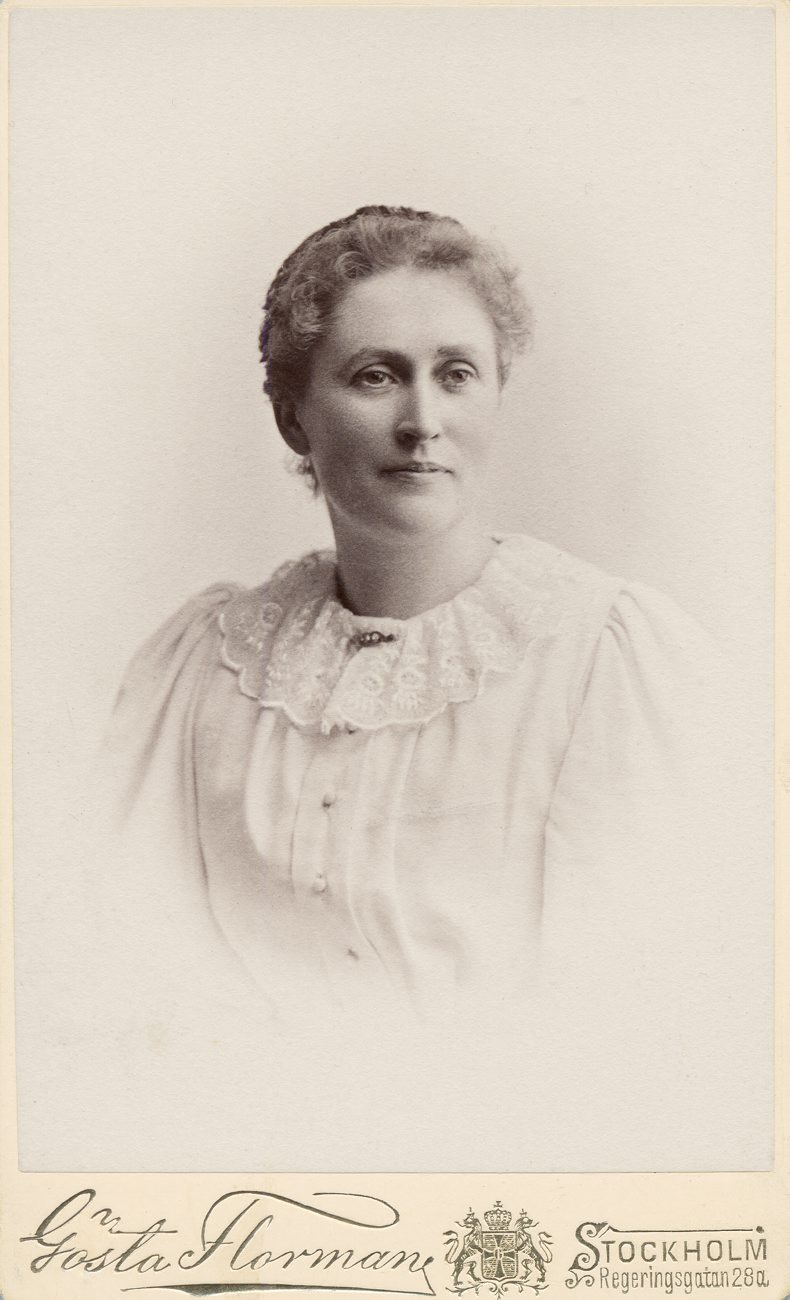
Gurli Linder

Ane Gurli Linder née Peterson (1865–1947) was a Swedish writer and feminist who was active in Stockholm's social life in the late 19th century when she also encouraged women to become more directly involved in culture. A strong supporter of libraries and reading, she later played an important role in pioneering the promotion and development of children's literature.

== Early life and education ==
Born on 1 October 1865 in Tysslinge, Örebro Municipality, Ane Gurli Peterson was the daughter of the landowner Carl Gustaf Peterson and Marie Christine Kavli. In 1879, she moved to Stockholm with her family. Following her father's death when she was 10 years old, she became a full boarder at Hammarstedt School.

She then went on to the Högre lärarinneseminariet teacher training college where she received her teaching diploma in 1885. As there were not many opportunities for women to study at the time, the training college became a centre for women intellectuals. It was probably there that Peterson first became involved in the Swedish women's movement. One of her companions at the college was the Nobel laureate Selma Lagerlöf who remained a lifelong friend.

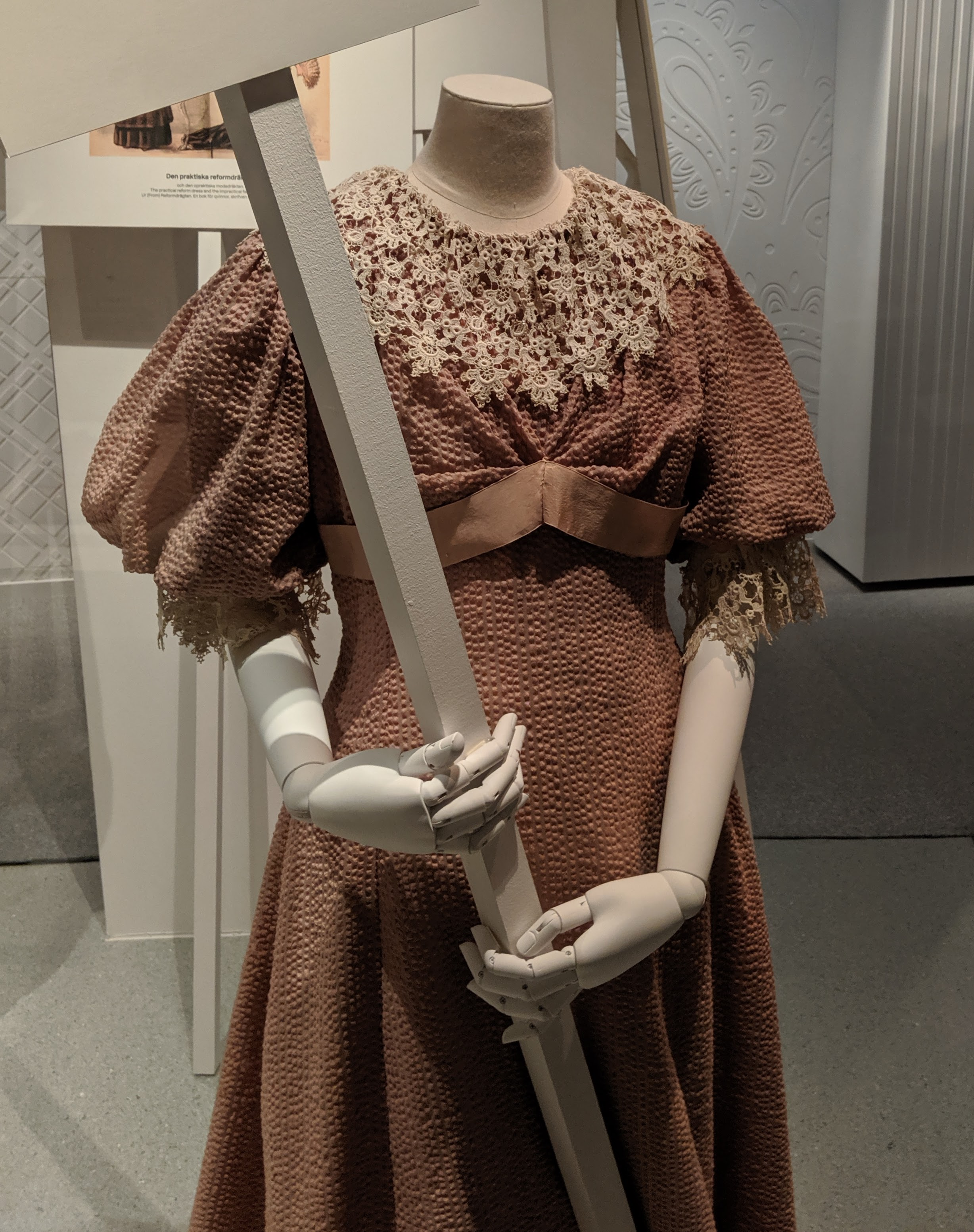
Feminist dress designed by Kristine Dahl for Gurli Linder

After working for two years as a schoolteacher, in June 1887, Gurli Peterson married the Norwegian philologist Nils Linder (1835–1904) who had been her Swedish teacher at the teacher training college. He was 30 years older than her. The couple had three children: Greta, Estrid and Tyra. Greta Linder grew up to be the first female library manager in Sweden.

== Career ==
Initially thanks to her husband's connections, Linder frequented Stockholm's intellectual receptions, salons and clubs including the feminist Ellen Key's Sunday meetings and Calla Curman's literature salons.

A budding journalist, she reported her encounters in the press. One of her main interests was the so-called clothing reform (dräktreformen) aimed at providing more suitable clothing for women. She founded the Association for Clothing Reform (Dräktreformförening) calling in particular for more practical clothing for schoolgirls and women with children. She also encouraged women to play a more active part in cultural life, encouraged by her friend Sophie Adlersparre who was active in women's rights as the founder of the Fredrika Bremer Association.

Linder's marriage broke up, and she left the family home. She lost custody of her daughters through the legal process of divorce, and only regained custody on the death of her former husband.

In the early 20th century, Linder became an active supporter of women's involvement in education and culture, regularly contributing to Folkbiblioteksbladet, the public library journal. She encouraged interest in reading for pleasure. Linder also contributed to various newspapers and magazines, addressing school education problems and women's issues as well as writing literary reviews. She also wrote several articles about the engineer and balloonist Salomon August Andrée with whom she had a romantic relationship.

Linder is remembered in particular as being a pioneer in examining Swedish books for children and acting as a critic of children's literature from 1900, especially in Dagens Nyheter. She continued to contribute to children's book reviews until the 1940s, influencing library acquisitions and the design and presentation of children's books, helping to increase the quality of children's book publishing.

Gurli Linder died in Stockholm on 3 February 1947 and is buried in Norra begravningsplatsen. After her death, her three daughters kept her home and opened it up as a meeting-place for artists, writers and librarians.
