= Hanna Winge =

Swedish painter

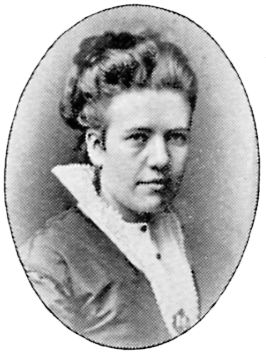
- Hanna Mathilda Winge
- Born: Hanna Mathilda Tengelin; 4 December 1838; Gothenburg, Sweden
- Died: 9 March 1896 (aged 57); Gothenburg, Sweden
- Education: J. J. Ringdahls målarskola; Royal Swedish Academy of Fine Arts
- Notable work: Anders and Brita
- Spouse: Mårten Eskil Winge (m. 1867)

Hanna Mathilda Winge, née Tengelin (4 December 1838 – 9 March 1896) was a Swedish painter and textile artist. She was one of the five founders of the Swedish women's association Nya Idun.

== Biography ==
Born in Gothenburg, Sweden, Hanna Mathilda Winge was the daughter of blacksmith Johan Thimotheus Tengelin and Anna Maria Hultman. She married the artist Mårten Eskil Winge (1825–1896) in 1867.

Winge was a student at J. J. Ringdahls målarskola (J. J. Ringdahl Art School) in Stockholm in 1859, and at the Royal Swedish Academy of Fine Arts in 1864–1867, and the student of Johan Christoffer Boklund (1817–1880).

Together with Sophie Adlersparre (1823–1895) and Molly Rohtlieb (1836–1914), Winge was the co-founder of the association Friends of Handicraft (Handarbetets vänner) which was founded in 1874 with the purpose of the development and refinement of Swedish textile art. She was the leading force of the association and was inspired by older textile art. She became known for her design in the Old Norse (Fornnordiska) style, such as embroidery inspired by Viking Age patterns with dragon loops for embroidery. Her style inspired the revival of the Old Norse style within art which was also demonstrated in her design of the villa in Lysekil of physician Carl Curman (1833–1913) in 1878, for which she and her spouse were engaged as decorators. Another area in which her style was displayed was in church textiles, where it spread after her design of an altar cloth at Uppsala Cathedral in 1882.

She participated in several exhibitions between 1860 and 1885 and was represented as a textile artist at the Art and Industry Exhibition at Copenhagen in 1872 and the Art Exhibition at Vienna in 1873. She designed a reform dress for the Swedish Dress Reform Association.

Winge was one of the founders of the women's association Nya Idun, along with Calla Curman, Ellen Fries, Ellen Key, and Amelie Wikström.

She died in 1896 in Gothenburg.

== Related reading ==
- James Graham-Campbell (2013) Viking Art (Thames & Hudson) ISBN 978-0500204191
- A. G. Smith (1999) Viking Designs (Dover Publications) ISBN 978-0486404691

== Other sources ==
- Handarbetets vänner i Nordisk familjebok (andra upplagans supplement, 1924)
- Svenskt konstnärslexikon, band V, sid. 700, Allhems förlag, Malmö 1967
- Nationalencyklopedin, multimedia 2000 plus
