= Carl Curman =

Swedish physician and balneologist

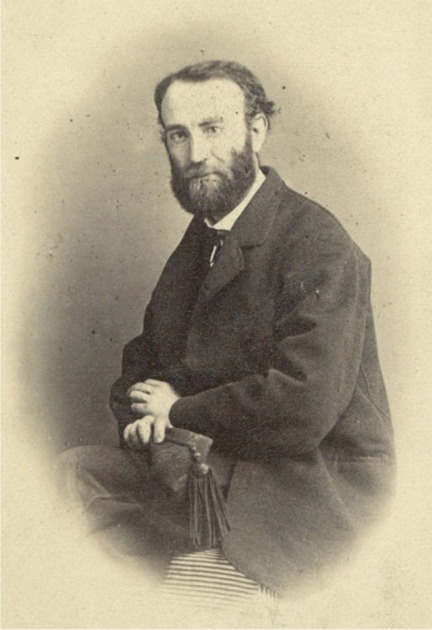
Photographic self-portrait of Curman, taken in 1861 (from the collection of the Swedish National Heritage Board)

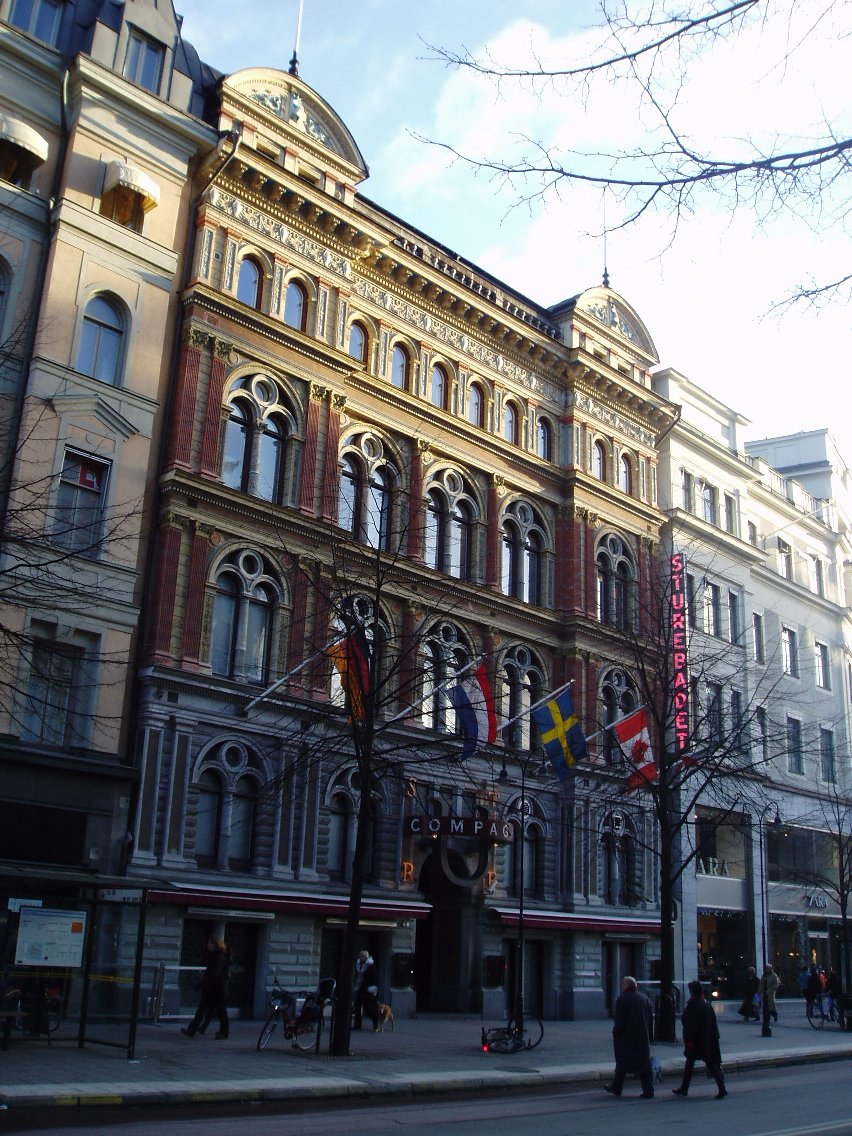
the Sturebadet bath house in Stockholm

Carl Peter Curman (8 March 1833 in Sjögestad – 19 October 1913 in Stockholm) was a Swedish physician and a prominent balneologist. he was also a gifted amateur architect and photographer.

After school in Skänninge and Linköping, Curman studied medicine at the University of Uppsala, where he took his preliminary medical degree in 1856, and at the Karolinska Institute in Stockholm, where he graduated with a master's degree in surgery in 1859 and a medical licentiate degree in 1864. He also spent several years as a student at the Royal Academy of Arts in parallel with his medical studies, and was considered one of the most promising students in sculpture. Curman taught anatomy at the Academy of Arts as acting professor in 1864-1865. From 1869 until 1902 he held a professorship of plastic anatomy there. He was also docent of balneology and climatology at the Karolinska Institute 1880-1898.

Carl Curman's main claim to fame was as a balneologist. Anders Retzius, who was Curman's teacher at the Institute, convinced him to take a position as physician at a bath resort outside Lysekil, established by an old sea captain J. G. Mollén, who had acquired some medical knowledge during his time at sea. After Mollén's death in 1863, the resort was transformed into a joint-stock company and Curman given the task of making plans for a modern resort. He personally designed the bath house and other buildings and remained as head for the resort until 1888. Curman was an influential propagator for the health effects of baths and initiated and led the construction of many bath houses, including the Sturebadet bath house at Stureplan in central Stockholm. Curman made the plans for the bath house and designed a façade modelled on the Ca' Vendramin Calergi in Venice.

Curman also designed his own classicist villa at Floragatan in Stockholm. During the last two decades of the 19th century, the salons there, hosted by him and his wife Calla, née Lundström, were popular among the artistic and intellectual circles of the capital.

His children included the architectural historian and restoration architect Sigurd Curman.

Curman's photography consisted prominently of cyanotypes depicting everyday Swedish life.

== Bibliography ==
- Josephson, C.D.: "Curman, Carl", Svenskt biografiskt lexikon, 9, pp. 459–466.
