= Greta Linder =

Swedish librarian (1888 – 1963)

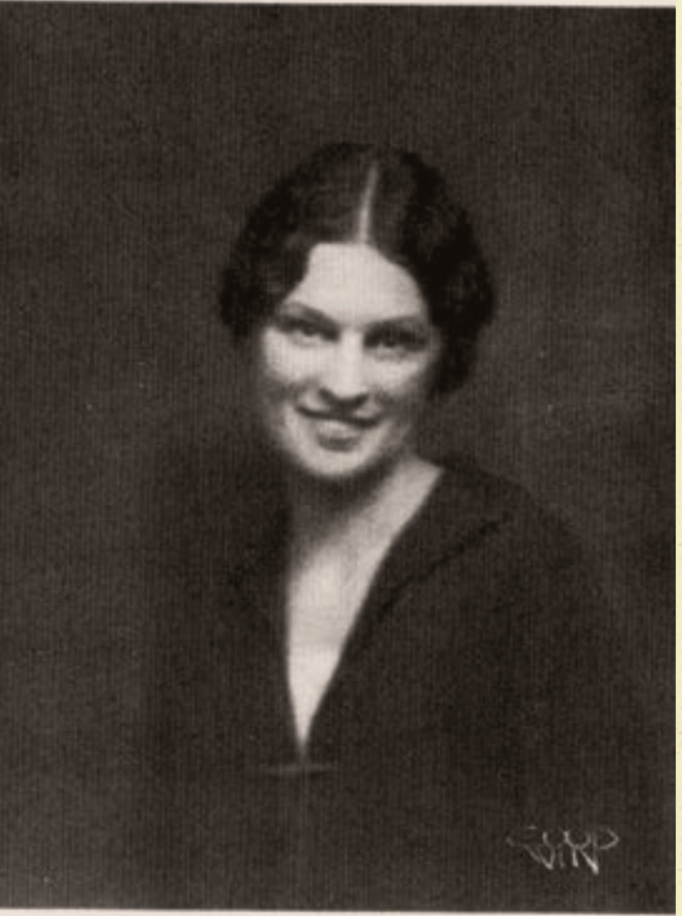
Greta Linder

Greta Linder (15 May 1888 – 19 October 1963) was a Swedish librarian. She became the first woman to work as a library manager, and the first librarian to advocate the importance of library publicity. She was an activist for librarians' union rights.

== Early life and education ==
Born as Ingrid Gurli Margareta Linder on 15 May 1888 in Hedvig Eleonora Parish, Stockholm County, Sweden, Greta Linder was the daughter of the Norwegian philologist Nils Linder (1835–1904) and his wife, the Swedish writer Gurli Linder (1865–1947). Her parent had a 30 year age difference which eventually led to the marriage break up in the early 1900s. Her mother left the family home and lost custody of her daughters through the legal process of divorce, only regaining custody on the death of her former husband. Linder attended Sofi Almquist's co-educational school in Stockholm. She later enrolled at Uppsala University, where she received a master’s degree in philosophy in 1911. With an aim of starting a professional career in teaching, she studied literary history and Nordic languages as well as English and German.

== Career ==
By chance, she started her professional career as an assistant at the state library agency which involved in organizing the public library system in Sweden with major tasks including administering state grants, drawing up rules for classification, cataloging and book selection, and training librarians.

In 1915 she was awarded a stipend by the American-Scandinavian Foundation to attend library school at the New York Public Library in order to study the American library system. She received a certificate from there in 1916. On her return, she presented a paper on library advertising at the third Swedish library conference, 1917, and introduced a number of new methods to apply for spreading information about public library service. She also travelled to Denmark where she studied the Danish libraries system and made several return visits.

From 1925 to 1929 she served as second librarian at the Stockholm City Library. Between 1929 and 1954 she worked as a library consultant at the state library agency.

She was also involved in women’s associations.

She died in Engelbrekt Parish, Stockholm, on 19 October 1963.
