= Alfhild Agrell =

Swedish writer and playwright (1849–1923)

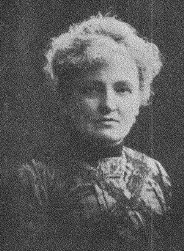
Alfhild Agrell (1909)

Alfhild Teresia Agrell (14 January 1849 – 8 November 1923) was a Swedish writer and playwright. She is known for her works on sexual equality in opposition to the contemporary sexual double standard, and as such a participator in the famous Sedlighetsdebatten.

== Life ==
She was born to Erik Johan Martin and Karolina Margareta Adolphson, who worked as confectioners. From 1868 until 1895 she was married to the Stockholmer merchant A. Agrell. She was engaged in the contemporary women's movement and the Sedlighetsdebatten, and belonged to the few radical women to wear the reform dress of the Swedish Dress Reform Association in public. Agrell was a member of the women's association Nya Idun after its founding in 1885 and one of its first committee members.

After several previous successes, Agrell's play Ensam (Alone) premiered at the Dramaten in Stockholm on 3 February 1886. The play depicts the socially committed Thora, who has taken care of her illegitimate daughter despite the reluctance of her surroundings. Ensam was a success and ran for 15 performances in the spring and autumn of 1886.

She temporarily used the pseudonyms Thyra, Lovisa Petterqvist and Stig Stigson, but soon began to use her own name, which was unusual for a woman; other famed female Swedish playwrights of the century, such as the sisters Louise and Jeanette Granberg, both used male pseudonyms. The subject that she concentrated on, sexual double standards, was very shocking for her time.

Agrell was an important contributor to the cause of gender equality in regard to sexuality; in her work, she handled the questions and consequences of sexual injustice, the sexual double standards such as the fact that a woman is subjected to contempt when she does the same thing as a man in sexual matters, the questions of having "a bad reputation", the questions of the blame put on the woman and not the man when a child is born out of marriage, and the difficulties when a woman of the people and a man of the upper classes fall in love and the consequences of such a relationship.

But she was pessimistic of the hope that men and women would ever reach sexual equality, and she doubted that a woman could find such a thing in marriage, where she by law was much restricted and given to her husband's whims.

== Works ==
- Räddad ('Saved'), 1883, play
- Dömd ('Judged'),1884, play
- Ensam ('Alone'), 1886, play
- Vår ('Spring'), 1889, play
- Ingrid, 1900, play
- Småstadsliv ('Small-town life'), 1884
- Från land och stad ('From the country to the city'), 1884, collection of novels.
- På landsbygden ('On the countryside'), 1887
- Norrlandsgubbar och Norrlandsgummor ('Old women and men in Norrland'), 1899–1900
- Vad ingen ser ('What no one sees'), 1885
- I Stockholm ('In Stockholm'), 1893
- Hemma i Jockmock ('At home in Jokkmokk'), 1896
- Nordanifrån ('From the North'),1898
- Guds drömmare ('Dreamer of God'),1904
- Norrlandshumör ('Norrland Temperament'),1910

== See also ==
- Agnes von Krusenstjerna
- Frida Stéenhoff
