= Augusta Lundin =

Swedish fashion designer

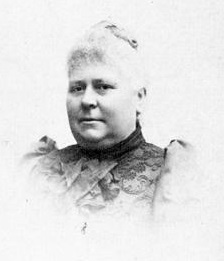
- Born: 13 June 1840; Kristianstad, Sweden
- Died: 20 February 1919 (aged 78)
- Occupation: fashion designer

Augusta Lundin (13 June 1840 – 20 February 1919) was a Swedish fashion designer. She is considered to be the first international Swedish haute couture fashion designer as well as the first well known fashion designer in Sweden.

== Early years and education ==
Born to tailor Anders Lundin and Christina Andersdotter in Kristianstad, she learned the profession of sewing as a child by her father, along with her sister Hulda Lundin.

== Career ==
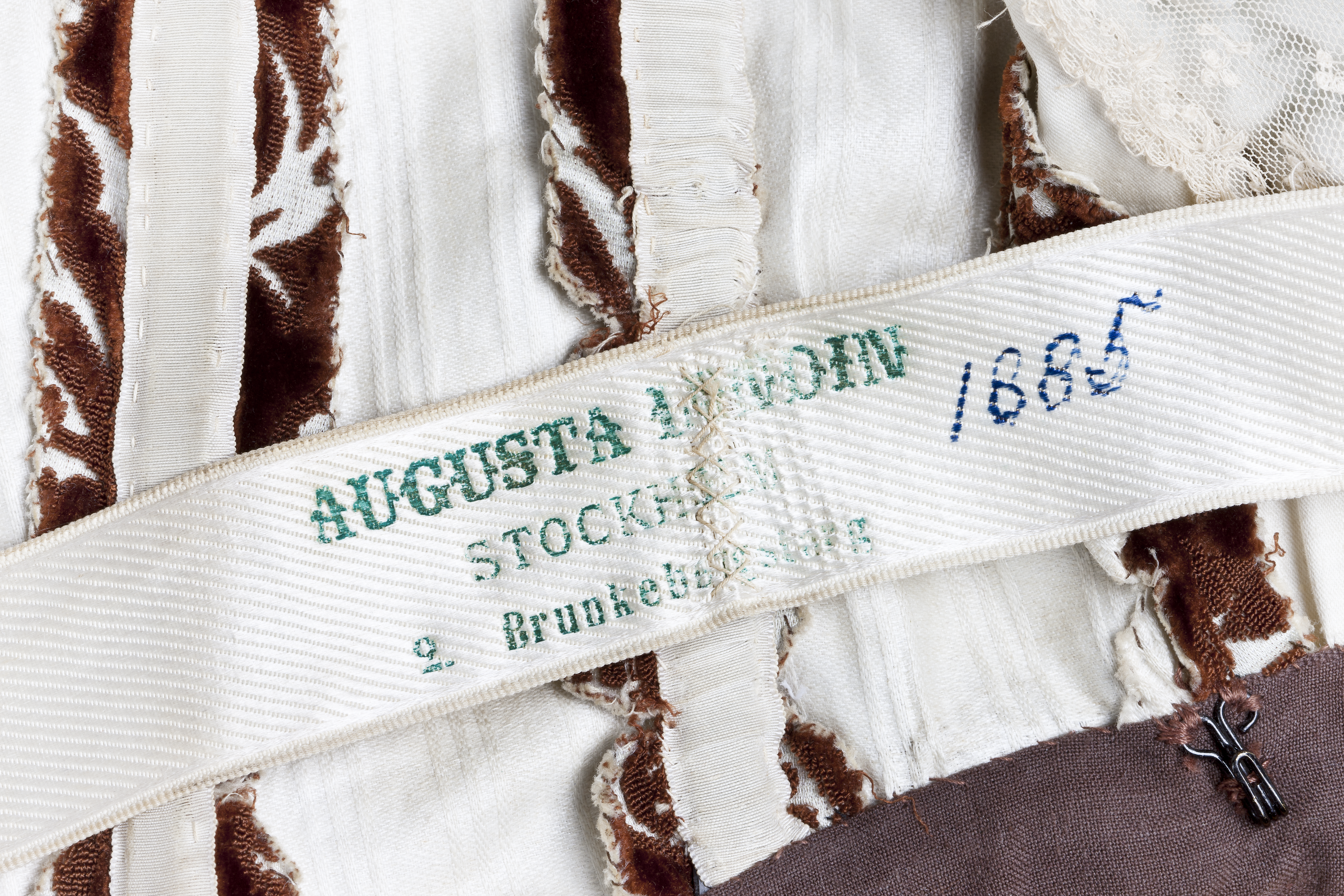
From her fashion house, 1885

She moved to Stockholm in the 1860s, where she was employed at the Emma Hellgren hatshop in 1863–65 and the fashion studio of C L Flory & co in 1865–67. She started her own fashion studio in 1867.

She made her first study trip to Paris in 1874, and started her own fashion paper. Lundin made study trips to Paris once a year. She introduced the French method of making every part of a dress separately to Sweden.

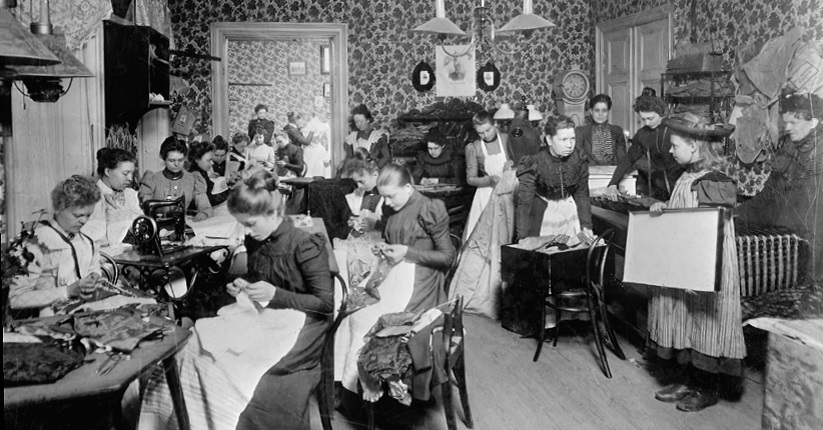
Working at the fashion house, 1900

Among her clientele were Selma Lagerlöf, Josephine of Leuchtenberg and Sophie of Nassau. She also had international clients, especially in Denmark, Norway, Finland and the Russian Empire.

On 31 October 1892, she was made official dressmaker of the queen, Sophia of Nassau. At assignments for the court, she brought models to the royal palace to display her design. King Oscar II of Sweden gave away her dresses as Christmas gifts every year to the lady-in-waitings at the royal court.

In 1886 she designed a "reformed costume", a loose dress without corset or bustle on commission of the reform dress society, and thereafter dressed her female gofers in the reform dress.

Lundin was known as a good employer. She was an honorary member of the dressmaker's society (1880). Aware that seamstresses often damaged their backs and eyes at work, she introduced an 12-hour work shift and a two-week summer vacation (1890), something quite unique for an employer in Sweden at a time when few employers allowed for vacations at all. She employed only women until 1910.

Augusta Lundin fashion studio was the most fashionable haute couture work shop in Sweden for a long time. It was not until the Nordiska Kompaniet introduced their own haute couture work shop, the NK:s Franska damskrädderi ("French Ladies Tailoring of NK") with the French designer Suzanne Pellin, that Lundin was given serious competition, which was eventually to supplant the Lundin work shop.

== Death and aftermath ==
At her death in 1919 she left the company to her siblings' children. In the 1920s, the company experienced difficulties because of the simplified fashion and the confection clothing industry; the smaller clientele looking for haute couture would now become the clients of the NK:s Franska damskrädderi, while the rest bought confectionary clothing, and the Lundin work shop was closed in 1939.

== Gallery ==
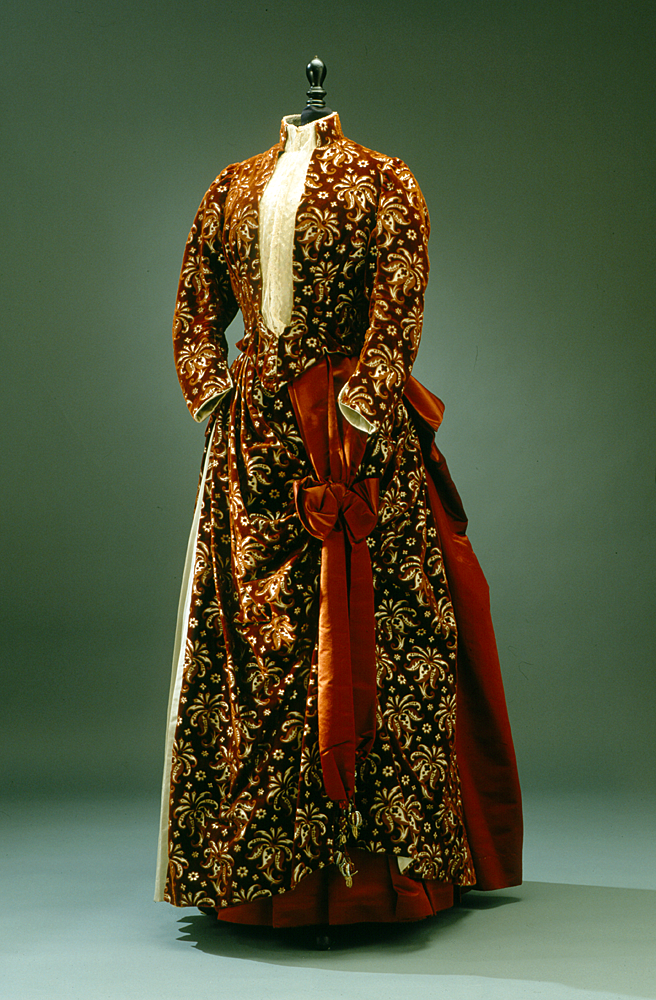

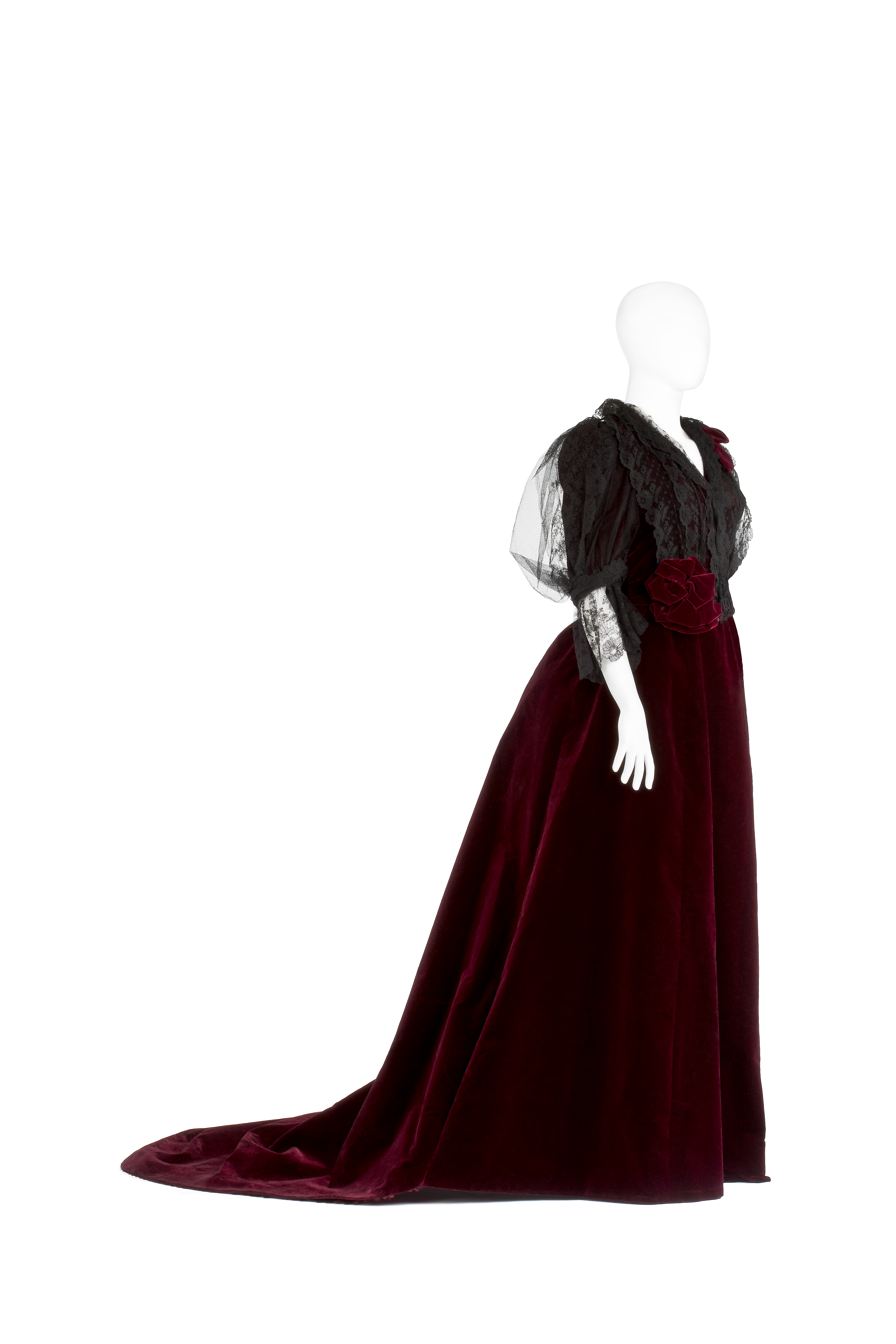

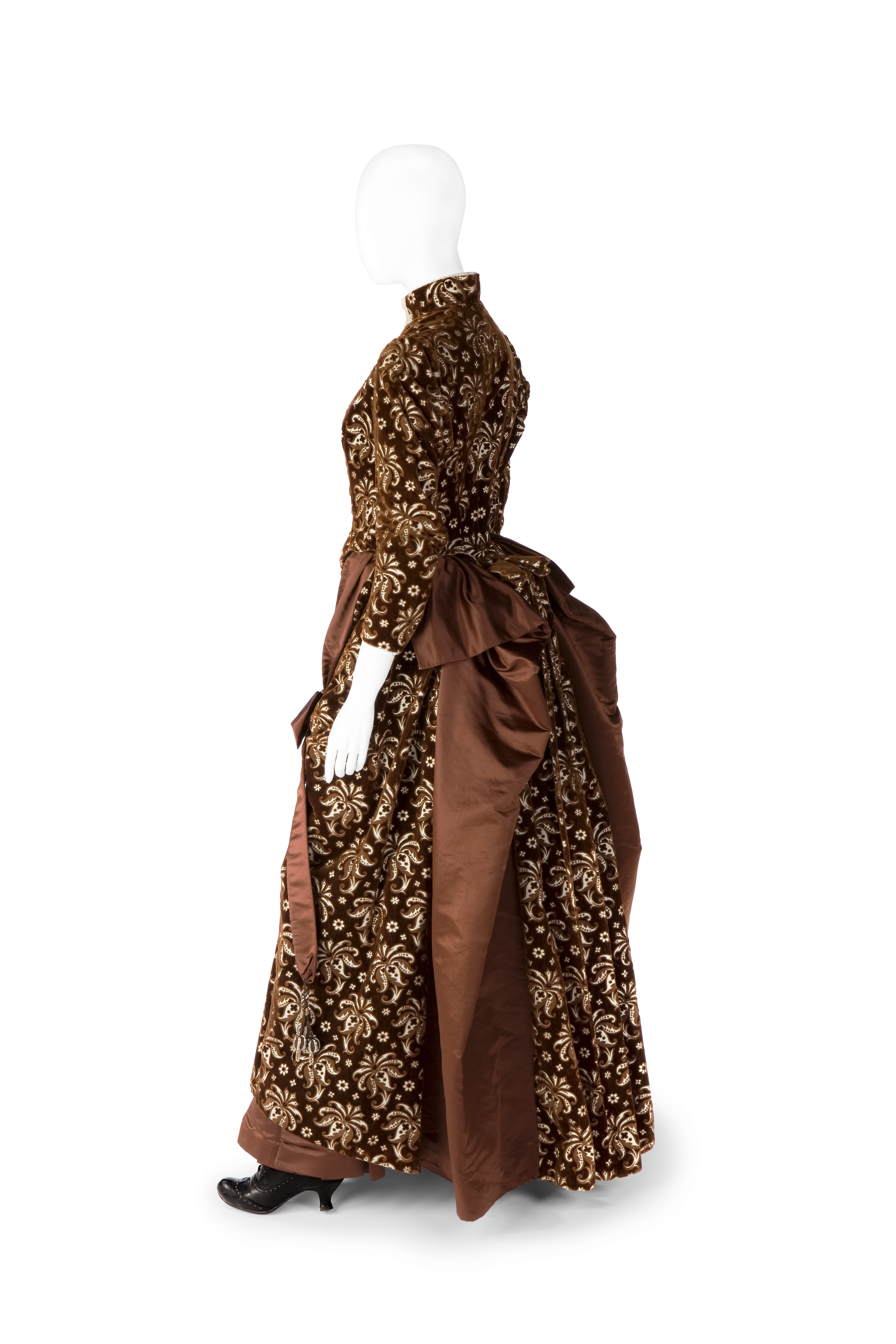

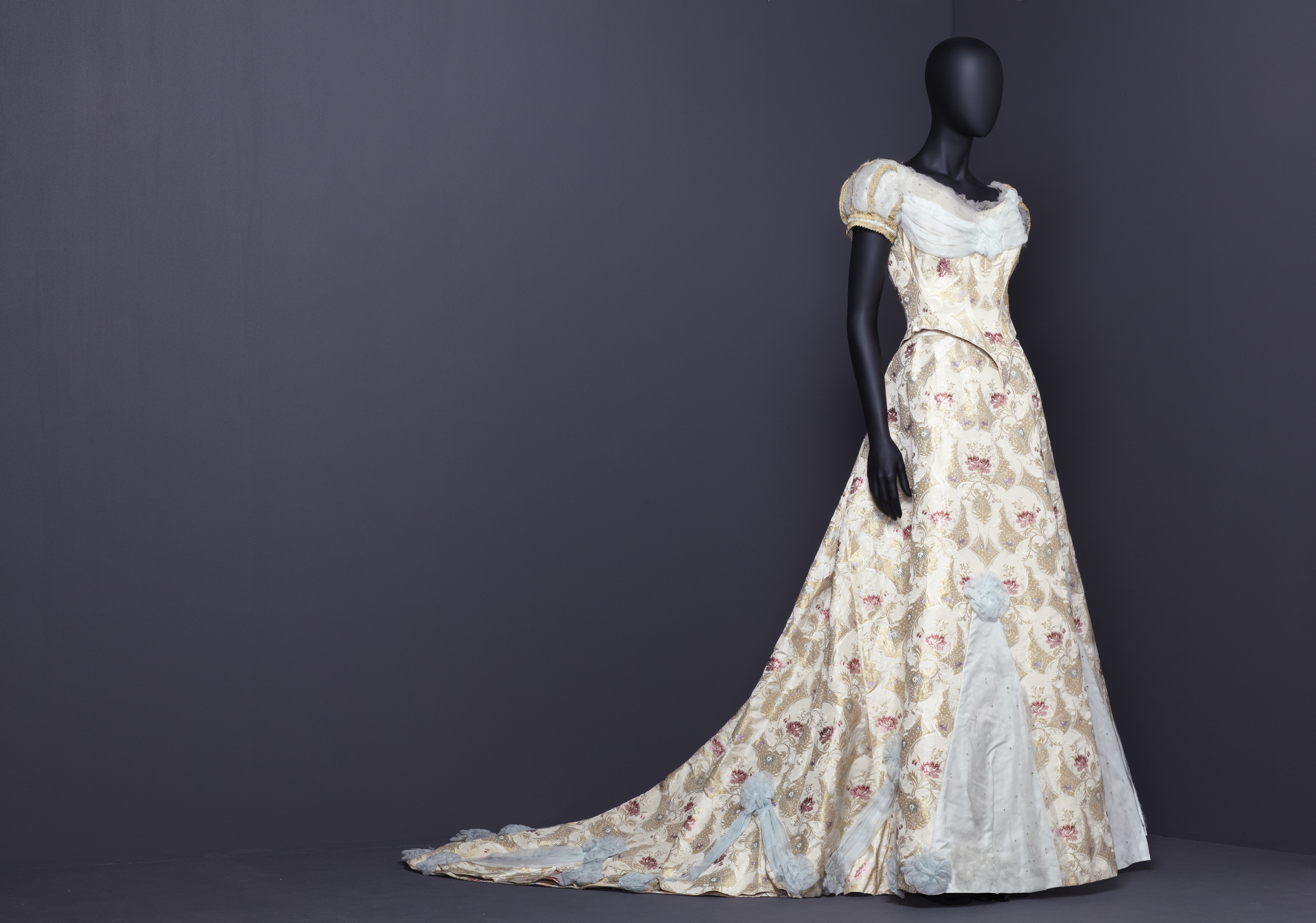

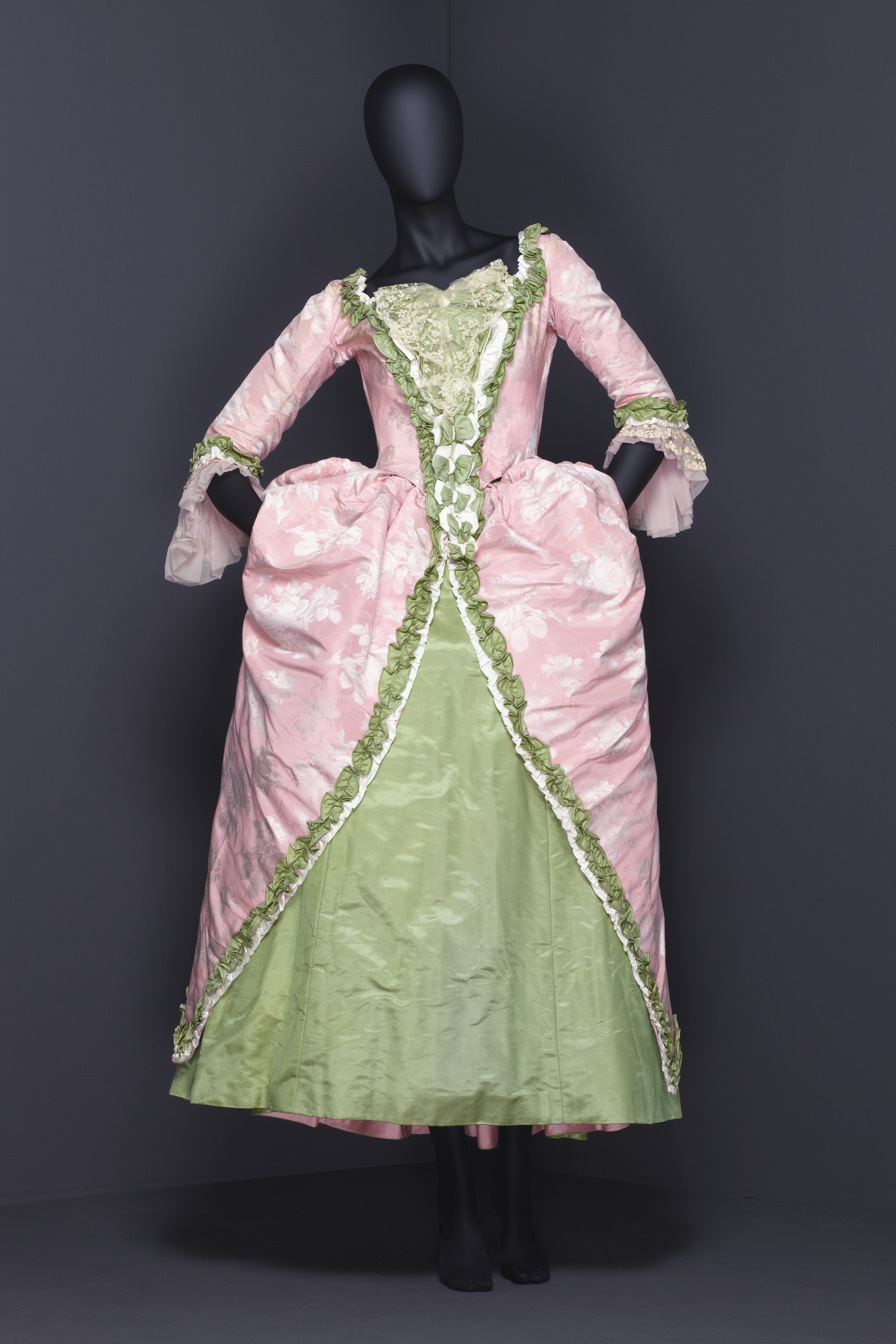
