= Stångehuvud =

Nature reserve in Västra Götaland, Sweden

- Stångehuvud Nature Reserve
- IUCN category III (natural monument or feature)
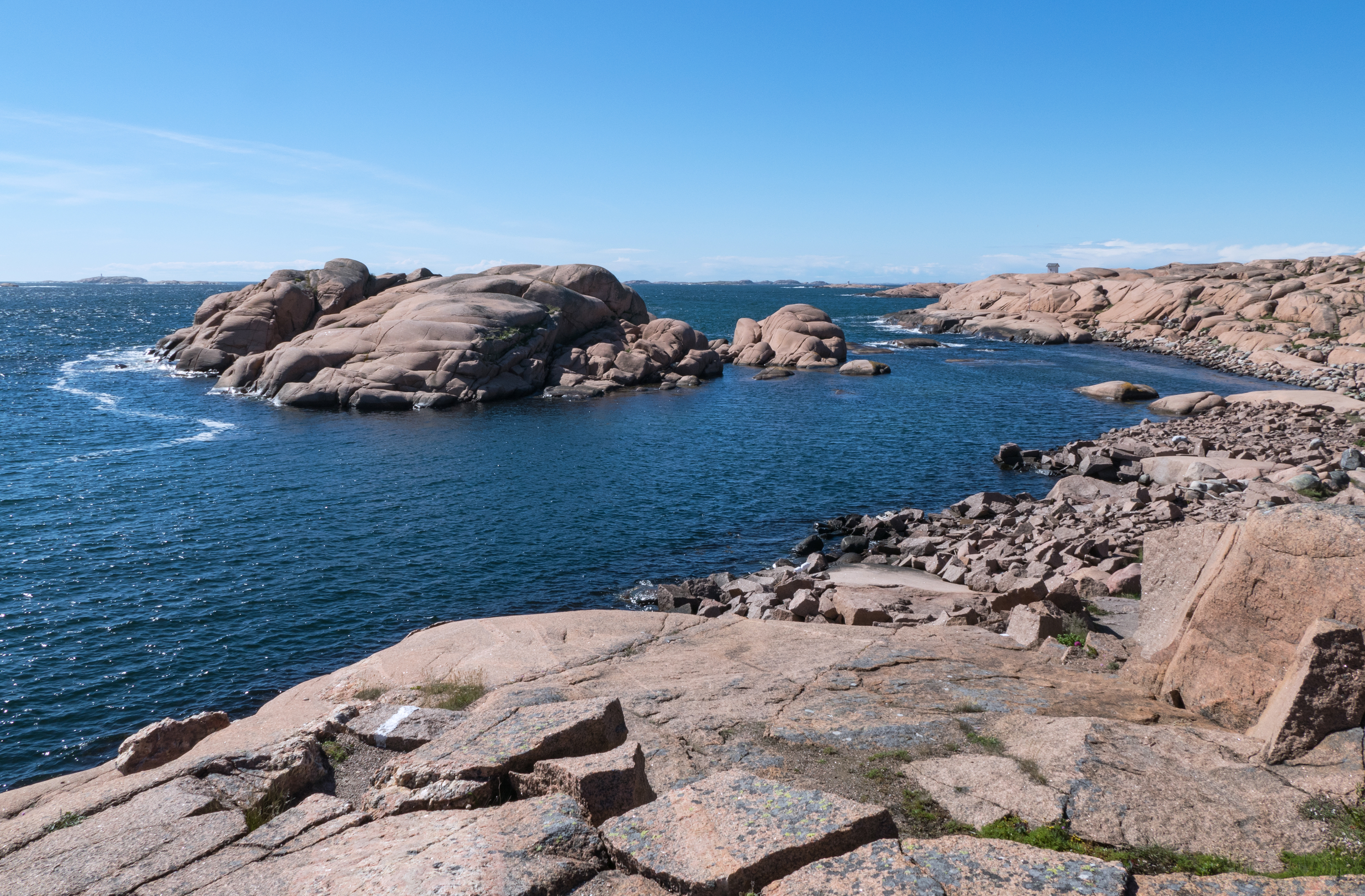
- Stångehuvud red granite cliffs

- Location within Västra Götaland Location within Sweden
- Nearest city: Lysekil, Sweden
- Coordinates: 58°16′14″N 11°24′59″E
- Area: 47.15 ha (116.5 acres)
- Established: 22 March 1982
- Administrator: Lysekil Municipality
- Website: www.stangehuvud.se

Stångehuvud is a nature reserve in Lysekil Municipality, Västra Götaland County, Sweden. It is located on the south tip of Stångenäset peninsula, adjacent the town of Lysekil. The reserve is known for its red Bohus granite. The granite was formed about 920 million years ago and the cliffs were later shaped by the ice during the last glacial period.

Formerly an area for quarrying granite, the area was bought and preserved by Calla Curman at the beginning of the 19th century. She donated it to the Royal Swedish Academy of Sciences and in 1982, the nature reserve was created.

In October 2020, 100 years after Calla Curman purchased Stångehuvud, two of the roads leading up to the nature reserve were named in honour of Calla and her husband Carl.

== History ==
During the second part of the 19th century, the red granite was much in demand and quarrying in Stångehuvud went on for about 50 years. Seeing that the natural cliffs were decimated by the stone industry, socialite and feminist Calla Curman started an unsuccessful campaign to organize the quarrying to preserve the most unique areas. The quarries provided many jobs for the local population and her pleas were ignored. So in 1916, she started to buy land in the Stångehuvud area. She often used agents so it would not be clear that the land was purchased by the same person. In 1920, she had managed to buy an area of 16 hectares (40 acres). On 3 November 1925, Curman donated all her land in Stångehuvud to the Royal Swedish Academy of Sciences, to be preserved for future generations. A foundation, the Carl and Calla Curman Foundation, was established to keep an eye on the area. In 1969, discussions started about giving Stångehuvud better environmental protection, and on 22 March 1982, the area was established as a nature reserve.

On one of the highest cliffs in Stångehuvud, Galleberget, is the Victoria Path, an accessibility adapted pathway and recreational area. It was Lysekil Municipality's gift in remembrance of the Wedding of Victoria, Crown Princess of Sweden, and Daniel Westling in 2010.

On 3 October 2020, the 100th anniversary of the purchase of Stångehuvud, the Calla and Carl Curman Foundation arranged an inauguration of two roads now named after Calla and her husband, Carl Curman. The roads offer two different paths which both leads to the nature reserve. The inauguration was a collaborative effort between the foundation and the municipality of Lysekil, taking place during the annual culture week of Lysekil.

== Nature ==
The main feature of Stångehuvud is the red granite cliffs, rounded and formed by the ice sheet during the last ice age. The area is rich with glacial striations. In 1972, the fauna was inventoried and about 230 different species of vascular plants were found among the mostly barren cliffs. One of the most common flowers found in Stångehuvud is the sea thrift (Armeria maritima). The flower grows out of cracks in the cliffs and starts blossoming between May and the beginning of June.

== Lighthouse ==
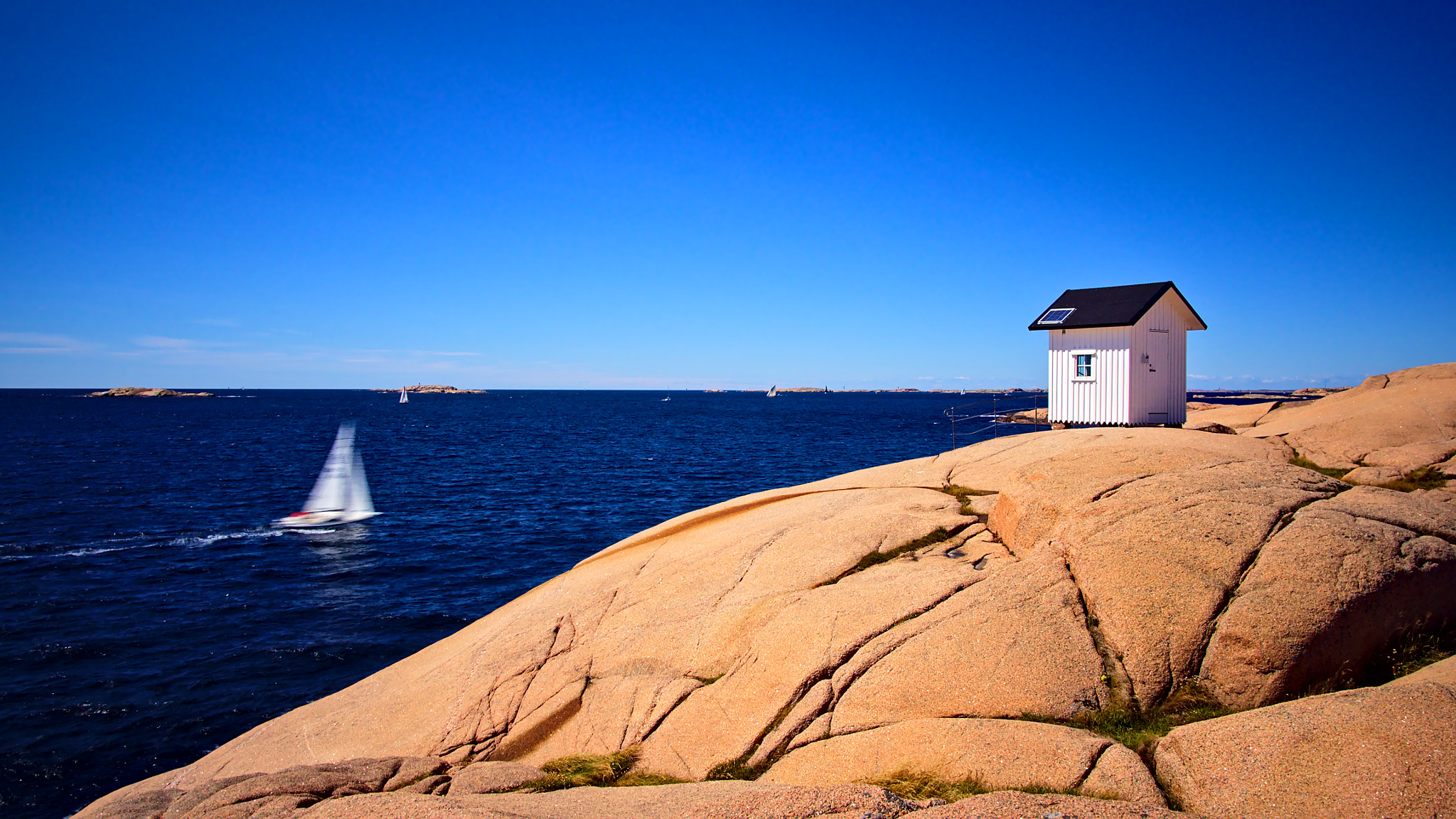
The lighthouse in Stångehuvud, Lysekil

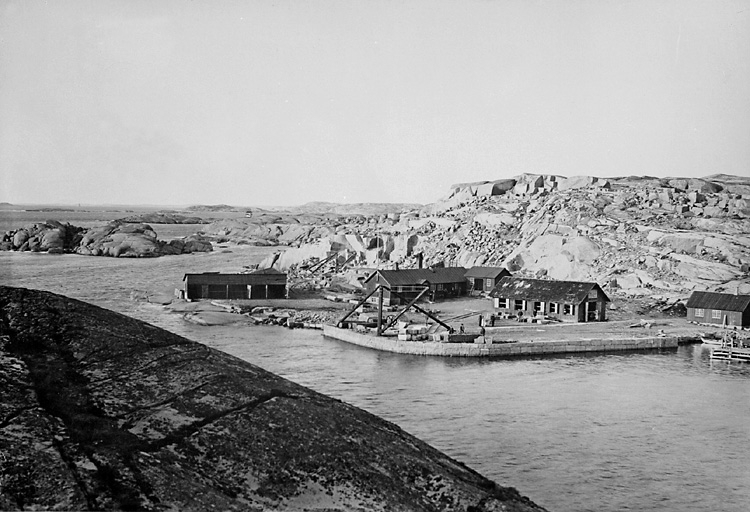
Stångehuvud quarry around 1900, from a similar angle as the main photo. The lighthouse is visible.

On the farthest tip of Stångehuvud is an old lighthouse, built in 1890. Its original kerosene light was replaced with an AGA light in 1917. The lighthouse was decommissioned in 1940 but the wooden building remained, cared for by Vikarvet Museum. In 2014, electrical light via a solar panel was installed in the lighthouse, now a noted landmark in the reserve.

Today the lighthouse is owned and cared for by the Carl and Calla Curman Foundation, who bought it in 2017 from Vikarvet Museum and renovated it soon thereafter.

In 2019, the lighthouse in Stångehuvud was selected as one of the seven wonders of the Västra Götaland region by the Västra Götaland Regional Council.
