= Hulda Lundin =

Swedish tailor and educator

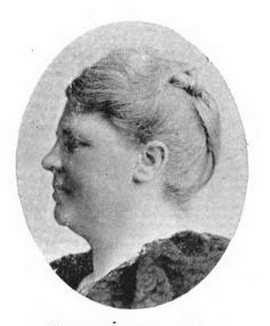
- at the World's Columbian Exposition (1893)
- Born: Hulda Sofia Lundin; June 12, 1847; Kristianstad, Sweden
- Died: March 13, 1921 (aged 73); Oscars Parish, Stockholm
- Education: Dahlska Girls School, Scania
- Occupations: tailor, educator, writer
- Relatives: Augusta Lundin (sister)
- Writing career
- Language: Swedish
- Subjects: sewing, sloyd

Hulda Lundin (June 12, 1847, Kristianstad – March 13, 1921, Oscars Parish, Stockholm) was a Swedish tailor and educator who laid the foundation for modern sewing education. She was the founder of the so-called “Swedish public school system of manual training”, and served as Inspector of Girls' Sloyd in the public schools of Stockholm. The government of Sweden granted Lundin a stipend to the World's Columbian Exposition in Chicago, the only woman thus chosen.

== Early years and education ==
Hulda Sofia Lundin was the daughter of Anders Lundin and Christine Andersson, as well as sister to the fashionista, fashion designer, and tailor Augusta Lundin and actor Anna Diedrich. Both Lundin and her older sister, Augusta, learned sewing from their father, who was tailor. She studied at the Dahlska Girls School from 1855 to 1863.

== Career ==
=== Educator ===
Lundin worked in 1862–1866 as a teacher at the Dahlska Girls School. In 1867, she moved from her native town in Scania to Stockholm to work as a teacher with special dispensation, as she did not graduate with a college degree. She secured a position as teacher of reading to a class of beginners. An interesting fact is that the natives of Scania have difficulty in pronouncing some of the letters of the alphabet, so this was a peculiarly trying position for the young teacher, twenty years of age, who was required to teach by the natural method, but the way in which she overcame its difficulties is a key to her character. Of it, she said: "As a Scanian I could not give the correct sounds of r and à (pronounced J). I was half discouraged, sought Inspector Meijerberg, and said to him: 'I cannot teach reading to beginners; I cannot teach reading by the natural method. Can I not have a class of older children to instruct?' The inspector's reply was: 'Learn what you do not know!' So early in the morning and late at night I rolled my r's and placed my lips and vocal organs in all possible and impossible positions in seeking a pure o, and-I conquered. It was a lesson which has been of practical value to me all my life; I discovered that difficulties and so-called impossibilities can be overcome!"

Lundin entered on her teaching career at a fortunate time, for it was not long before the question of manual training in schools began to occupy the minds of pedagogues, and in 1881, it was decided to send out a female teacher at the expense of the celebrated Lars Hierta's memorial fund, to study the German system of Rosalie Schallenfeld as applied to hand work for girls. Lundin had won such high opinions from the school board that she was chosen by them as the most fitting person for this important errand, because in addition to the excellent manner in which she had performed her regular school duties, she had shown her interest in the subject of manual training by taking a trip in 1872 to England and Scotland and in 1877 to Switzerland, especially to study this subject.

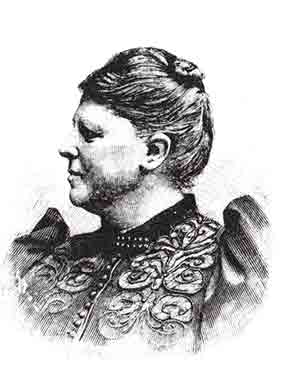
Hulda Lundin (1880)

Lundin visited Germany for the purpose of finding out the reason for so much ingenuity on the part of the children of that country. After close observation she obtained sufficient knowledge of the deft and ingenious work done by them and the manner in which it was accomplished. Returning to Sweden she introduced into the public schools of her native country a thorough and practical system of handiwork. This system is taught boys and girls alike, and the result has been that, at the close of the school term the young people were experts with the needle. Patching, darning, knitting, crocheting, plain sewing, designing, cutting and making garments is a part of their daily instruction. After the trip to Germany in 1881, Lundin began to form the pedagogy, which was called alternating "Lundinska kursen, the Stockholm method" and the "Folkeskolans method". The pedagogy was inspired by Rosalie Schallenfeldt's teaching in female craft forms in Germany, and involved a methodological learning process, where different elements of teaching followed each other in a determined order. There was also an element in the pedagogy that craft education was developing in a number of other ways such as by learning out of order. The Schallenfeld method was introduced by way of experiment into two Stockholm schools, and normal classes for the teachers were established. The committees of other cities soon seeing the value of the new work, invited Lundin to form normal classes for their teachers, and this she did, going even to Finland to introduce the system. Eventually, Lundin began teaching other teachers in her education methods, which was characterized by the teaching of the sloyd in Sweden in the latter part of the 19th century.

In 1884, she was sent by the government to Karlsruhe to study the subject further, and on her return in 1885, was appointed inspector of girls' sloyd in all the public schools of Stockholm. In 1887, Lundin visited France and Belgium on behalf of the state, and two years later, made a second journey of investigation to France at her own expense. The result of these student journeys was an intelligent, discriminating collection of material, through the use of which, by adaptation to the needs and conditions of her own country, a new and independent system was developed which in many respects, far exceeded the German one. The founder of the so-called “Swedish public school system of manual training” had the satisfaction of seeing her system used in Norway, Denmark, Finland, and even in the United States, where it was introduced into the New York Training College for Teachers.

Among her efforts to spread her system and bring about the good results that experience had shown her would follow, Lundin prepared and published several books describing it, giving programs of work in the various school grades and containing illustrations. An exhibit of Lundin's system of girls' sloyd was sent to Chicago, where it was displayed in the Swedish Building and in the Woman's Pavilion, arranged in upright cases decorated with the Viking style of ornament.

=== Other interests ===
Lundin's organizing and executive powers were recognized and appreciated in other circles than purely educational ones, for she was one of the directors of the woman's club of Stockholm called Nya Idun, which was a monthly assemblage of women of the capital in literary, artistic, musical, educational, scientific, and philanthropic circles, and she was also one of the members of the Women's Committee of Sweden for the Chicago Exposition. The government of Sweden granted Lundin a stipend to the Chicago Exposition, the only woman thus chosen. She also represented the Swedish Women's Committee there.

She was invited by the Swedish National Bureau of Education to be one of their honorary vice-presidents of the Department Congress of Industrial and Manual Instruction, and was also appointed a member of the Advisory Council of the Woman's Branch of the World's Congress Auxiliary on a World's Congress of Representative Women. Lundin was the first female member of the board of the Swedish Folk Higher Education Association, and was also a member of the board of the Swedish Teachers' Magazine.

== Selected works ==
- Klädsömnad : Handledning i Måttagning, Mönsterritning och tillklippning af fruntimmerskläder, 1888 (in Swedish)
- Franska skolförhållanden : Reseanteckningar., 1889 (in Swedish)
- Handledning i metodisk undervisning i kvinnlig slöjd, 1892 (in Swedish)
- En efterskörd från Chicagoutställningen., 1895 (in Swedish)
- Klädsömnad : Handledning i måttagning, mönsterritning och tillklippning af fruntimmerskläder : Med 9 teckn:r : Till skolans och hemmets tjänst., 1899 (in Swedish)
- Föredrag hållet vid Hulda Lundins slöjdkurs 25-års-jubileum., 1907 (in Swedish)
