= Swedish Dress Reform Association =

Swedish women's association

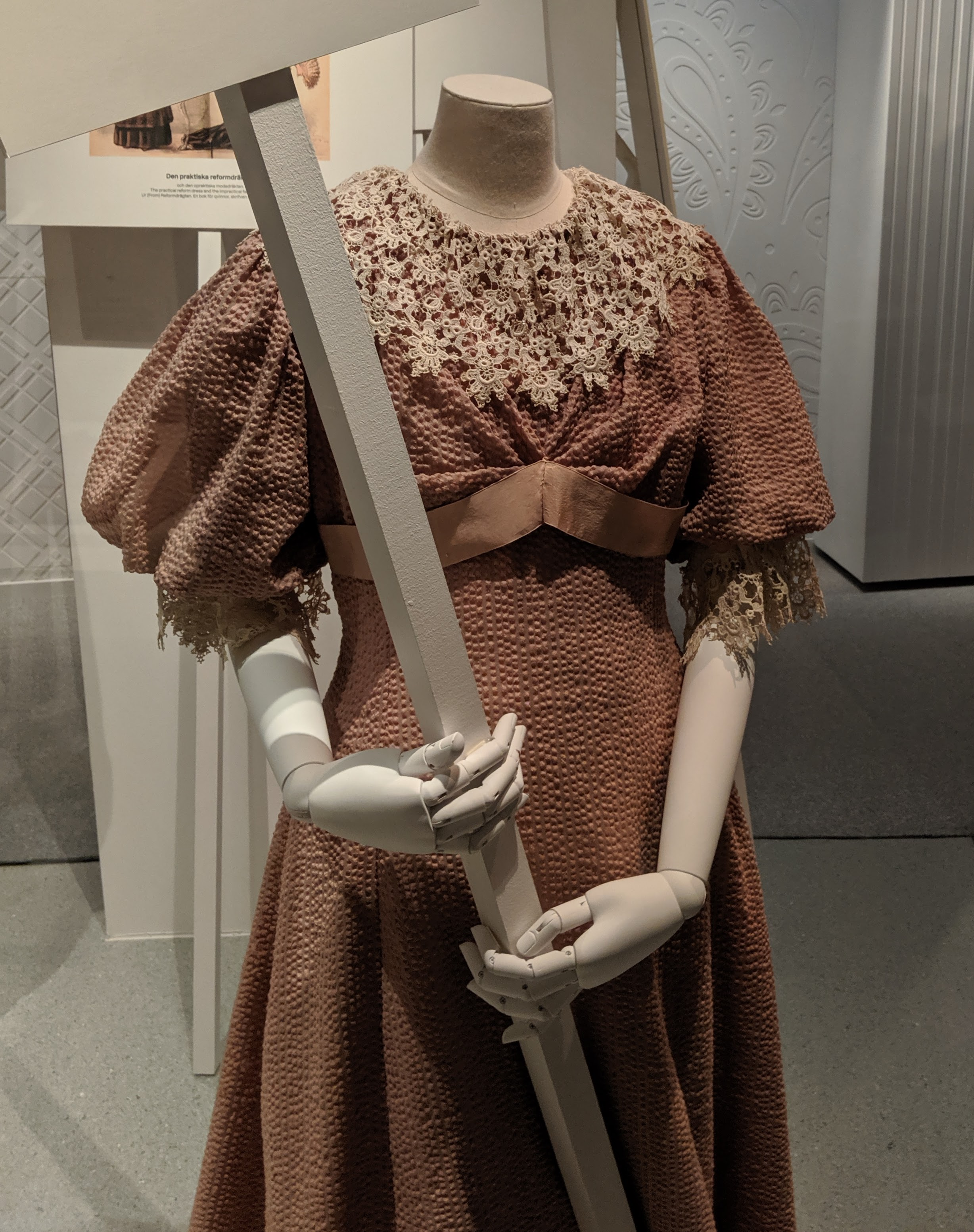
Feminist dress designed by Kristine Dahl (Oslo 1896) for Gurli Linder

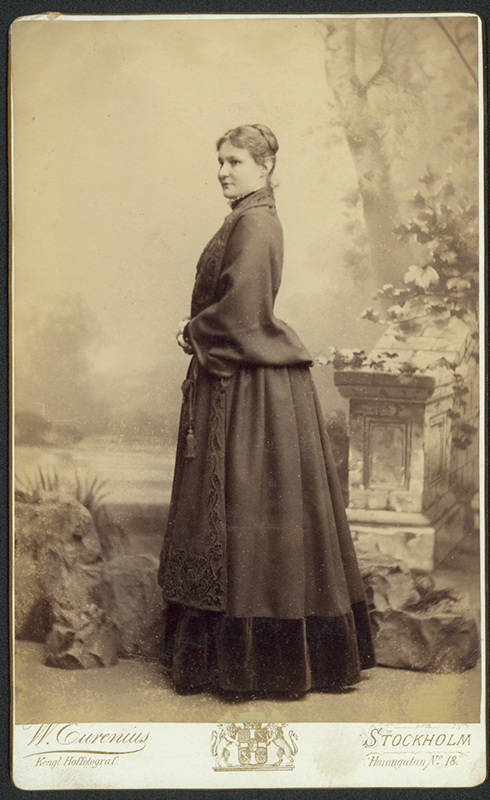
Portrait of a woman in reform dress.

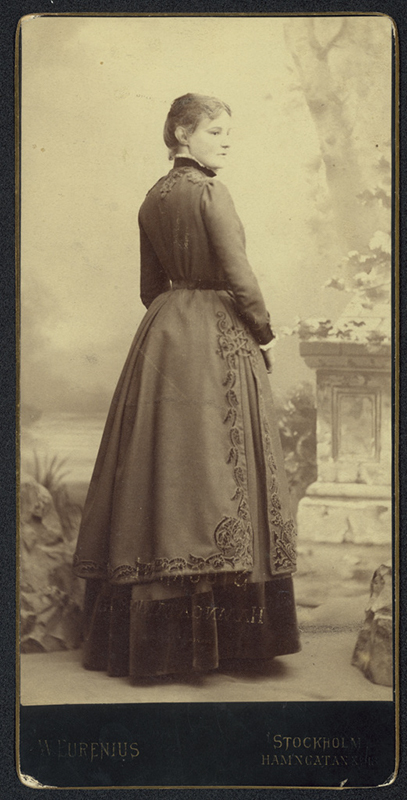
Portrait of a woman in reform dress.

Swedish Dress Reform Association (Swedish: Svenska drägtreformföreningen) was a Swedish women's association, active from 1886 to 1903. It was a part of the Victorian dress reform, and worked to reform women's dress toward a more healthy and comfortable style, including abolishing the corset. The movement attracted a lot of attention and achieved some success during its duration, such as making corsets unfashionable among school girls.

== History ==
=== Foundation ===
The views of the Victorian dress reform were made known in Sweden by the book Dress and Health, which was translated to Swedish under the name Reformdrägten (likely by Oscara von Sydow) with an introduction by Curt Wallis and Hanna Winge. In February 1885, Anne Charlotte Leffler held a speech on the subject in the women's club Nya Idun, and asked Hanna Winge to design a Swedish reform dress; when this was done, Leffler became the first woman in Sweden to wear a reform dress. This created publicity, and in April 1886, a group of women founded the Svenska drägtreformföreningen with the purpose of introducing and adapting the Victorian dress reform movement's ideas in Sweden.

Many famous contemporary Swedish women were members of the Svenska drägtreformföreningen. Among the members were Anna Hierta-Retzius and Ellen Key, who acted as its first, temporary chairperson upon its foundation, until a permanent one could be elected.

=== Activity ===
The society was active in changing public opinion toward a more healthy dress style for women by public lectures, articles and publications. It was given wide support by Scandinavian medical doctors, and Curt Wallis, Karolina Widerström and Lorentz Dietrichson all wrote supporting articles which denounced particularly tight lace corseting as unhealthy. In 1889, Queen Sophia invited the chairperson to an official audience and invited her to display the reform dresses designed by Augusta Lundin at Ulriksdal Palace, and afterward gave the society her formal support, which was publicized as a great success.

=== Impact ===
While no separate dress reform society was established in the other Nordic nations of Denmark, Finland and Norway, the women's movement in these countries was influenced by the Swedish dress reform society and was also active on the issue.

The reform dress of the society was manufactured by Friends of Handicraft and by the studio of Augusta Lundin, who dressed her gofers in the reform dress. The reform dress in itself never managed to become popular, although a few radical women such as Calla Curman, Sonja Kovalevsky, Alfhild Agrell and Anna Boberg wore the reform dress in public. However, the society did achieve some success in regard to the use of corsets on girls. In the 1890s, it was reported that the use of corsets within Swedish girl' schools had diminished markedly, as it was no longer regarded proper for a school girl to wear a corset.

=== Dissolution ===
In 1890, the association became a part of the Fredrika Bremer Association. It was considered a natural step for Swedish women's associations at the time to organize under the FBA, but it sorted as a separate entity under the FBA and continued to function independently. After 1896, however, the progressively more simple and comfortable fashions, the introduction of sportswear during cycling and the decrease in tight-laced corsets made the activity of the society diminish. In 1903, it was dissolved.

== Chairperson ==
- 1886-1886: Ellen Key
- 1886-1889: Kerstin Bohman
- 1889-1892: Marie-Louise Berg
- 1892-1896: Gurli Linder

== See also ==
- Rational Dress Society
- National Dress Reform Association
- Artistic Dress movement
