= Pasquale del Pezzo =

Italian mathematician (1859–1936)

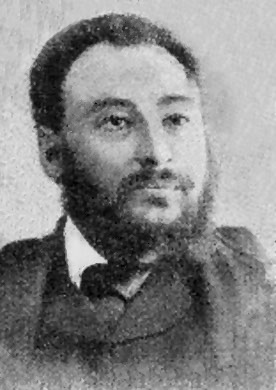
Pasquale Del Pezzo

Pasquale del Pezzo, Duke of Caianello and Marquis of Campodisola (2 May 1859 – 20 June 1936), was an Italian mathematician.

== Early life and education ==
Del Pezzo was born in Berlin (where his father was a representative of the Neapolitan king) on 2 May 1859. At the University of Naples, he received first a law degree in 1880 and then in 1882 a mathematics degree.

== Career ==
He became a pre-eminent professor at that university, teaching projective geometry, and remained at that University, as rector, faculty president, etc. Del Pezzo was mayor of Naples from 1914 to 1917. Starting in 1919 he became a Senator of the Kingdom of Italy until his death.

== Personal life ==
His wife was the Swedish writer Anne Charlotte Leffler, sister of the great mathematician Gösta Mittag-Leffler (1846–1927).

== Death and legacy ==
He died in Naples on 20 June 1936. Del Pezzo is remembered particularly for first describing what became known as a del Pezzo surface.

== Sources ==
- Gario, Paola (1989), "Resolution of singularities of surfaces by P. del Pezzo. A mathematical controversy with C. Segre", Archive for History of Exact Sciences, 40 (3): 247–274, doi:10.1007/BF00363551, ISSN 0003-9519, MR 1023714
- G. Gallucci, Rend. R. Acc. delle Scienze Fisiche e Mat. di Napoli, 8, 1938, 162–167.
