= Selma Giöbel =

Swedish artist

Selma Giöbel (1843–1925) was a Swedish artist. She was active as a textile designer (particularly for carpets and wallpaper), sculptor and engraver, and regarded as one of the most notable Swedish textile designers of the late 19th century. She was a member of the Friends of Handicraft and co-founded the art firm Svensk Konstslöjdsutställning ("Swedish Art- and Handicrafts Exhibition") with Berta Hübner and was its managing director in 1885–1898. She successfully participated in several international art exhibitions.

Giöbel was a member of the women's association Nya Idun and one of its first committee members. She was awarded the Illis quorum in 1898.
