= Amalia Fahlstedt =

Swedish writer, educator, and translator

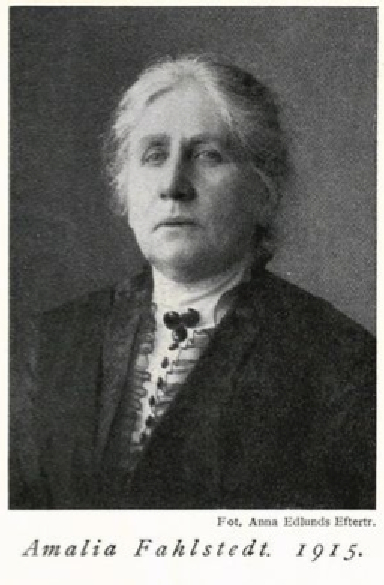
- Amalia Fahlstedt
- Born: Amalia Wilhelmina Fahlstedt; 8 January 1853; Stockholm, Sweden
- Died: 29 January 1923 (aged 70); Djursholm, Sweden
- Occupations: Writer; educator; translator
- Parents: Anders Gustaf Fahlstedt; Johanna Wilhelmina Bergström

Amalia Wilhelmina Fahlstedt (8 January 1853 – 29 January 1923) was a Swedish writer, educator, and translator. Throughout her career, she wrote numerous books, and was an active member of the 19th century women's movement.

== Life ==
Amalia Fahlstedt was born on 8 January 1853 in Stockholm, Sweden. She was the fifth of six children born to Anders Gustaf Fahlstedt, a shopkeeper, and his wife Johanna Wilhelmina Bergström. Fahlstedt undertook the Rossander Course of teacher's training, where she received lessons on language teaching. After her father's death, the family started struggling financially. To overcome the financial strain, Fahlstedt taught students and in 1877, she established her own school with the help of her sister Bertha.

Fahlstedt met Swedish playwright August Strindberg, who inspired her to start writing. In 1883, she published her first literary work I flygten, a collection of short stories. She followed this with Ax och Halm (1887), a polemic which explores the themes of marriage, as well as female education and employment. She also published the short story Ett lefnadsmål which was influenced by the contemporary reform pedagogy ideas. Fahlstedt wrote two novels, En passionshistoria (1897) and I dödvattnet (1889), under the pen name Rafael. She also published a pair of short story anthologies, and books for children and young adults. She wrote for several newspapers and journals, and translated works in Italian and Dutch to Swedish.

Fahlstedt became a close friend of Swedish difference feminist writer Ellen Key. The two co-founded Tolfterna, an association which connected working women with educated middle-class women, and served as an influential forum for social and cultural discussions.

Fahlstedt died in Djursholm on 29 January 1923.
