= Nya Idun =

Swedish women's cultural association

- Formation: 7 February 1885; 140 years ago
- Founder: Calla Curman; Hanna Winge; Ellen Fries; Ellen Key; Amelie Wikström
- Founded at: Stockholm, Sweden
- Type: Women's association
- Website: https://www.nyaidun.se

Nya Idun ('New Idun') is a Swedish cultural association for women founded in 1885, originally as a female counterpart to Sällskapet Idun ('the Idun Society'). Its aim was to "gather educated women in the Stockholm area for informal gatherings".

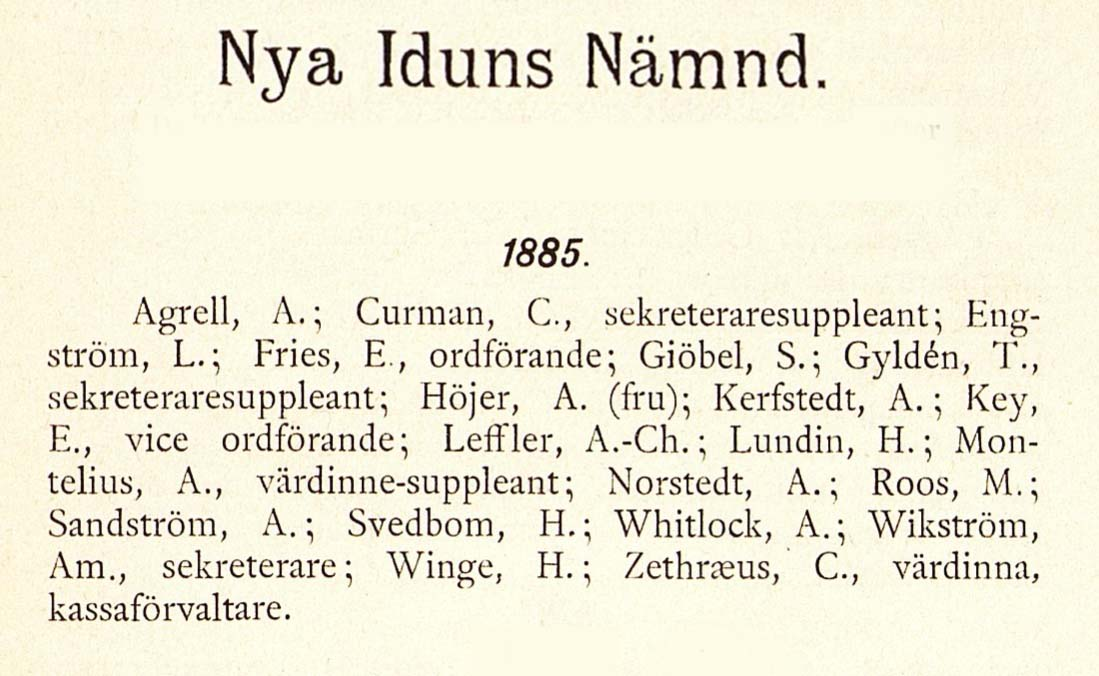
Nya Idun's committee, 1885

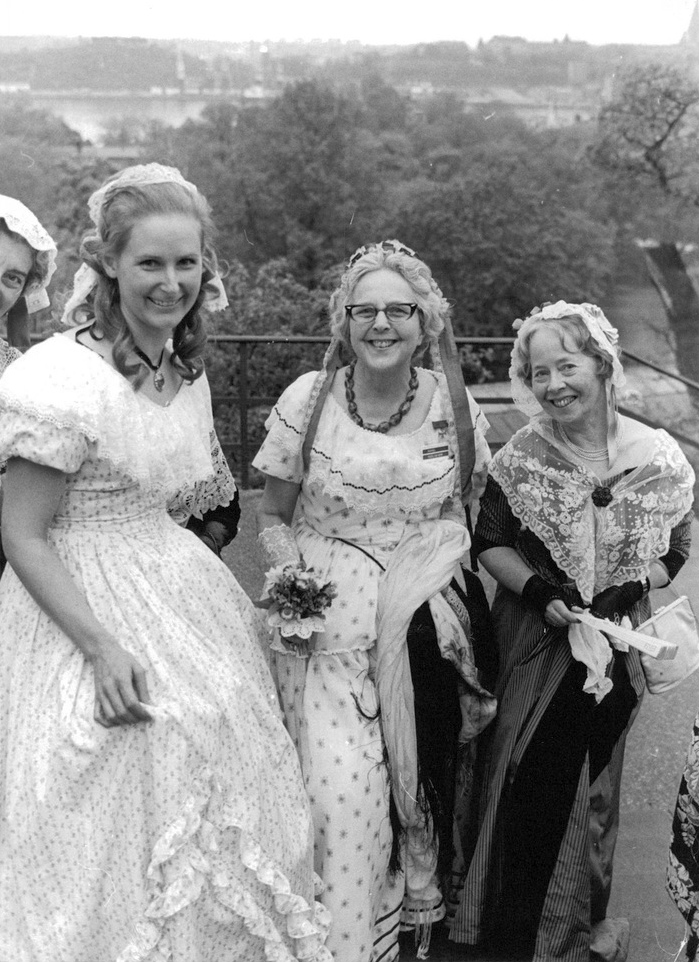
Birgit Sommer, Gunnel Hazelius-Berg and Margit Siwertz dressed in 1800s clothing at Nya Idun's spring festival at Solliden at Skansen, May 1968.

== Activity ==
Nya Idun was founded on 7 February 1885 on the premises of the Hushållsskola at Jakobsbergsgatan 11 in Stockholm. Its founders were Calla Curman, Hanna Winge, Ellen Fries, Ellen Key and Amelie Wikström. The first fifteen women elected to the association's committee were Alfhild Agrell, Lilly Engström, Selma Giöbel, Therese Gyldén, Anna Höjer, Amanda Kerfstedt, Anne Charlotte Leffler, Hulda Lundin, Agda Montelius, Anna Munthe-Norstedt, Mathilda Roos, Anna Sandström, Hilma Svedbom, Anna Whitlock, and Coraly Zethræus.

The association's model was Sällskapet Idun in Stockholm, founded in 1862, which, according to its statutes, was for "men living in Stockholm who have their own activities and interests in science, literature and art in various fields". Sällskapet Idun accepted only male members, and Nya Idun was formed to serve as a counterpart for women.

On the founding of the organization, Calla Curman wrote, "Why shouldn't we women too, regardless of our different political and religious views, be able to come together for a mutual exchange of ideas in common intellectual, artistic and literary interests?"

The association met once a month, with art exhibitions and musical and literary lectures. Its first meeting was attended by 20 people. On that occasion, author Anne Charlotte Edgren-Leffler gave a lecture on, among other things, the Victorian dress reform movement abroad, which led to the founding of the Swedish Dress Reform Association the following year.

The association still exists for women academics and artists of various kinds.

== Women's journals ==
A Swedish-language women's journal of the same name, Nya Idun, was published in Minneapolis, Minnesota, from 1906 to 1924 by Magnhild Anderson.

There was also an early 20th-century Swedish women's journal with the name Idun, published from 1887 to 1963.
