= Sjögestad =

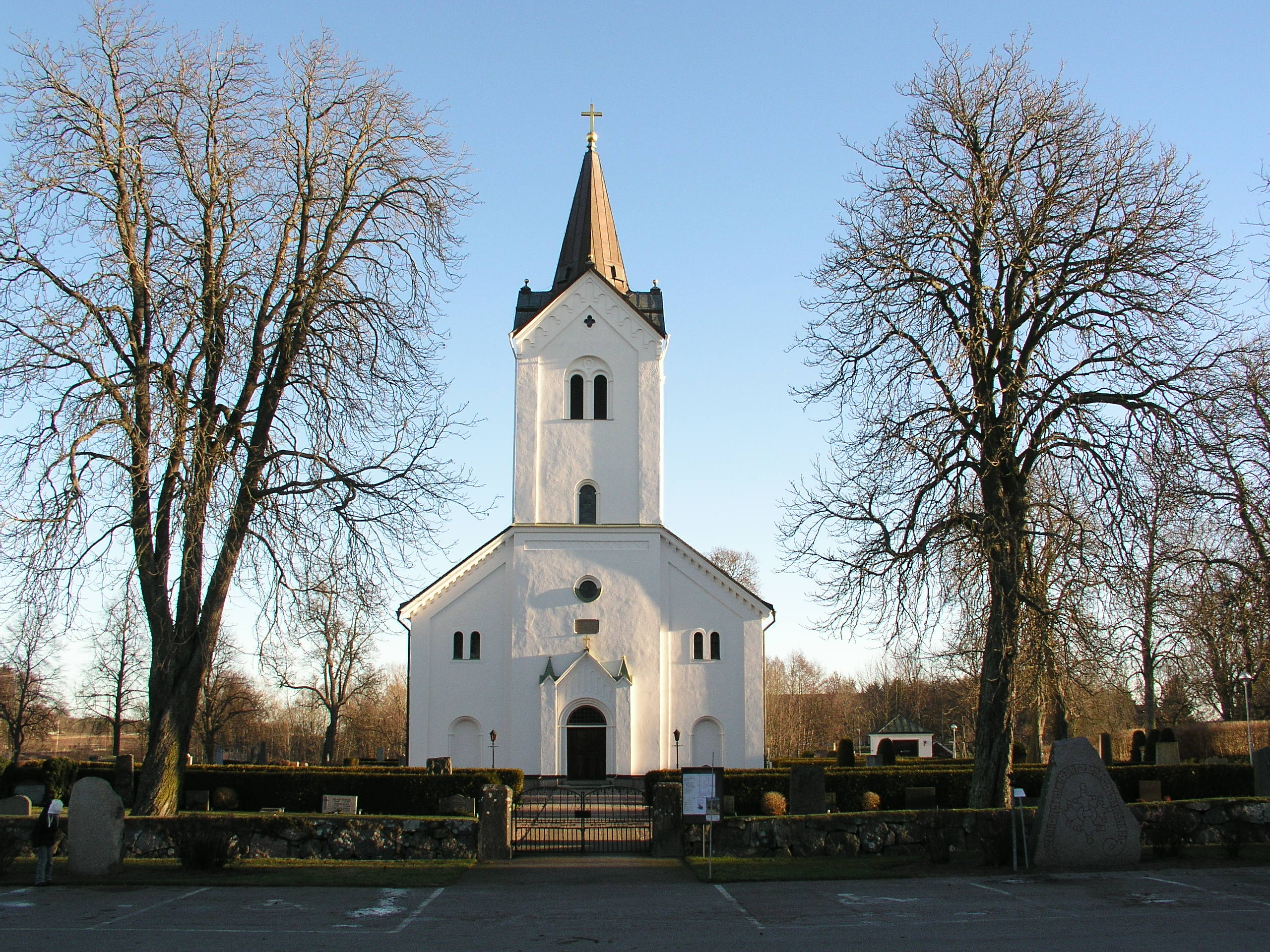
- Sjögestad Church

- Location within Östergötland Location within Sweden
- Coordinates: 58°22′N 15°22′E
- Country: Sweden
- Province: Östergötland
- County: Östergötland County
- Municipality: Linköping Municipality

Area
  - Total: 0.41 km^{2} (0.16 sq mi)

Population (31 December 2010)
  - Total: 300
  - Density: 725/km^{2} (1,880/sq mi)
- Time zone: UTC+1 (CET)
  - Summer (DST): UTC+2 (CEST)

Sjögestad is a locality situated in Linköping Municipality, Östergötland County, Sweden with 300 inhabitants in 2010. The parish church, a mix of the neo-Gothic and neo-Classic belongs to Linköping Diocese. Previously there was a Romanesque church in Sjögestad.
