= Anne Charlotte Leffler =

Swedish author

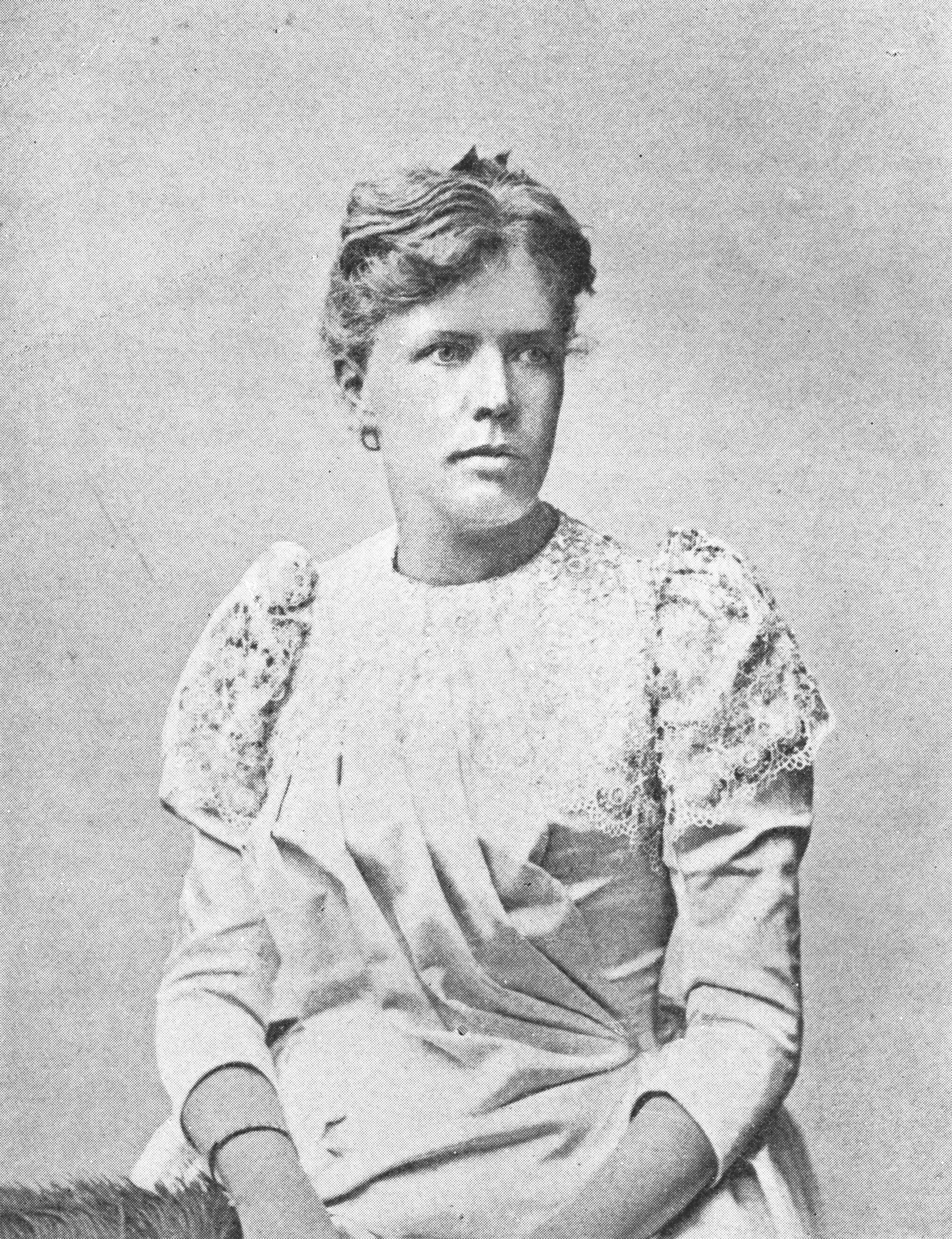
Anne Charlotte Leffler.

Anne Charlotte Edgren-Leffler, duchess of Caianello (1 October 1849 – 21 October 1892), was a Swedish author.

== Biography ==
She was the daughter of the school principal John Olof Leffler and Gustava Wilhelmina Mittag. Her brother was noted mathematician Gösta Mittag-Leffler. Leffler was initially educated privately and then studied at the Wallinska skolan from the age of thirteen, at that time perhaps the most progressive school open to females in Stockholm.

Her first volume of stories appeared in 1869, but the first to which she attached her name was Ur lifvet ("From Life," 1882), a series of realistic sketches of the upper circles of Swedish society, followed by three other collections with the same title. Her earliest plays, Skådespelerskan ("The Actress," 1873), and its successors, were produced anonymously in Stockholm, but in 1883 her reputation was established by the success of Sanna Kvinnor ("True Women") and En räddande engel ("An Angel of Deliverance"). Sanna Kvinnor is directed against false femininity, and was well received in Germany as well as in Sweden.

Leffler had married G. Edgren in 1872, but about 1884 she was separated from her husband, who did not share her advanced views. She spent some time in England, and in 1885 produced her Hur man gör gott ("How one does good"), followed in 1888 by Kampen för lyckan ("The Struggle for Happiness"), with which she was helped by Sofia Kovalevskaya. Another volume of the Ur Lifvet series appeared in 1889, and Familjelycka ("Domestic Happiness," 1891) was produced in the year after her second marriage (to the Italian mathematician, Pasquale del Pezzo, duke of Cajanello).

She was also active within the women's movement. Leffler was an early member of the women's association Nya Idun, founded in 1885, and was one of its committee members. At its first meeting, she spoke in favour of the Victorian dress reform and raised the issue of dress reform in Sweden, which resulted in the foundation of the Swedish Dress Reform Association.

Her dramatic method forms a connecting link between Ibsen and Strindberg, and its masculine directness, freedom from prejudice and frankness won her work great esteem in Sweden. Her last book was a biography (1892) of her friend Sofia Kovalevskaya, by way of introduction to Sonya's autobiography. An English translation (1895) by Annie de Furuhjelm and A. M. Clive Bayley contains a biographical note on Fräu Edgren-Leffler by Lily Wolffsohn, based on private sources.

Leffler died in 1892 of complications from appendicitis in Naples, Italy.

== Bibliography ==
- 1892 - Sonja Kovalevsky. hvad jag upplefvat tillsammans med henne och hvad hon berättat mig om sig själf, 1892. Translated as: Sonja Kovalevsky. A. Biography. And Sisters Rajevsky, being an account of her [own] life. London: T. Fischer Unwin, 1895. Also as: Sonia Kovalevsky. Biography and autobiography. I. Memoir, by A. C. Leffler (Edgren) duchessa di Cajanello. II. Reminiscences of childhood written by herself. New York: Macmillan and Co., 1895
