= Calla Curman =

Swedish writer and feminist (1850–1935)

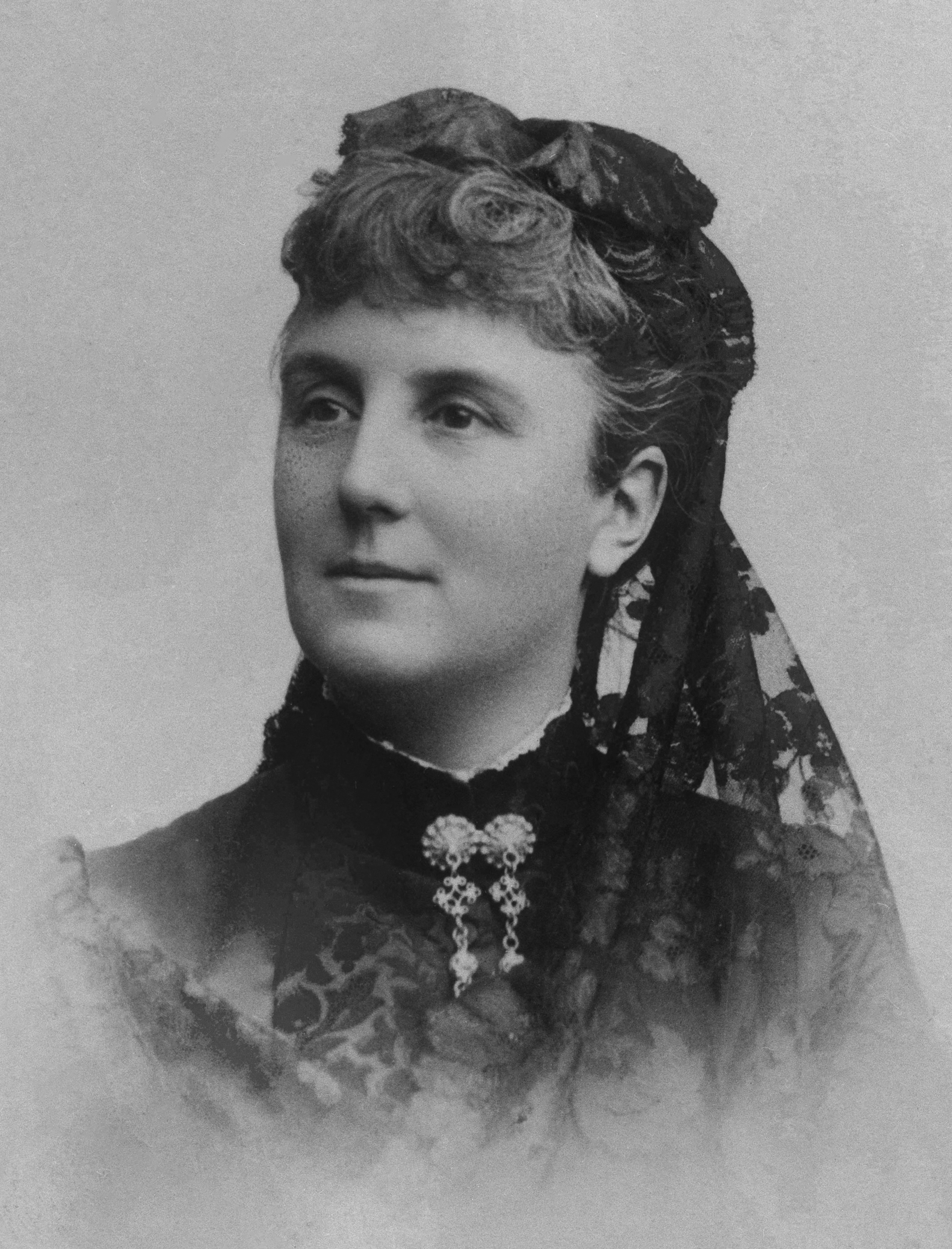
- Calla Curman around 1880
- Born: 12 November 1850; Jönköping, Sweden
- Died: 2 February 1935 (aged 84); Stockholm, Sweden
- Resting place: Norra begravningsplatsen
- Occupations: Writer, founder of stångehuvud nature reserve
- Spouse: Carl Curman (m. 1878)
- Children: Sigurd Curman: Ingrid Fries; Nanna Fries; Carl G. Curman

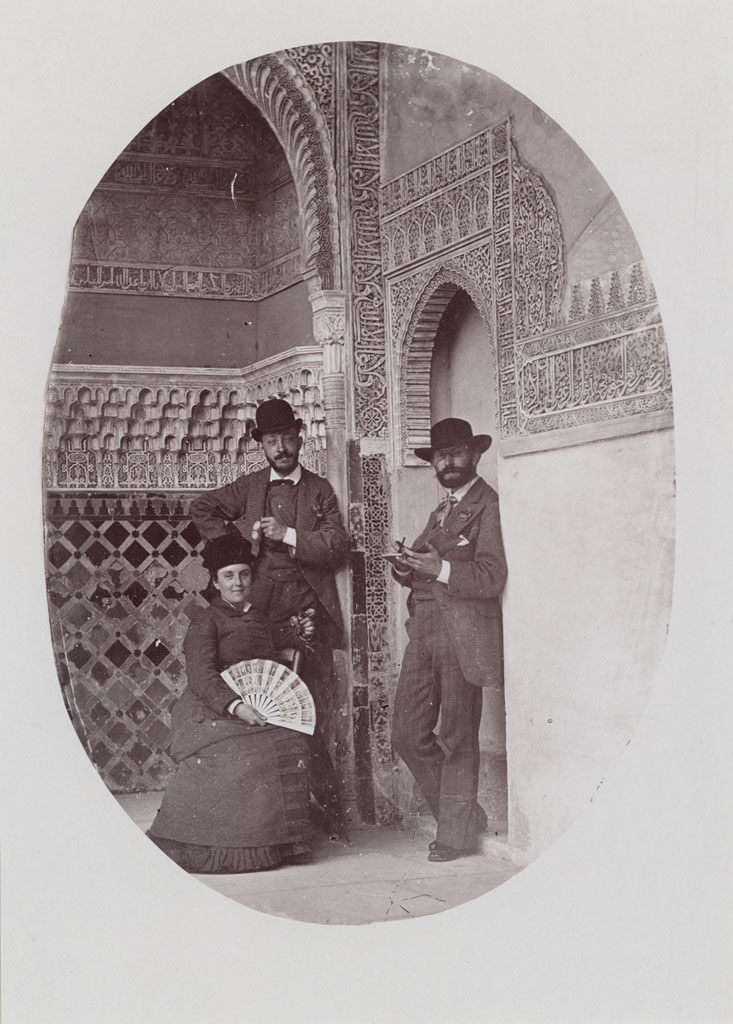
Curman with fan and two unknown men on the Alhambra palace grounds, in Granada, Andalusia, Spain (1878). Credit: Carl Curman

Calla Curman (née Lundström; 12 November 1850 – 2 February 1935) was a Swedish writer, salon-holder and feminist. She was also the founder of Stångehuvud nature reserve and one of the five founders of the women's association Nya Idun.

== Family ==
Calla Lundström was born on 12 November 1850 in Jönköping, Sweden, the only child of wealthy industrialist Carl Frans Lundström and his wife Sofie Malmberg (1830–1897). She received in-home tutoring from a private tutor. At the age of 17, she married Adolf Liljenroth (1836–1874), a battalion physician, with whom she had two children, Gunhild Hasselrot and Ragnar Liljenroth.

A few years after she was widowed, Lundström's parents took her on a trip to Italy. The educated Carl Curman, whom she had met on a visit with her mother to Lysekil during a few summer weeks in 1864, was invited to join them as a guide for the Italian trip. In 1877, she returned to Lysekil, then as Professor Carl Curman's guest. The following year they were married. He had worked as a spa doctor in Lysekil since 1859. With Curman, she had children Sigurd Curman, Ingrid Fries, Nanna Fries and Carl G. Curman.

== Activity ==
Curman was the initiator of the founding of the Nya Idun women's society in 1885; it was founded together with Ellen Fries, Hanna Winge, Ellen Key, and Amelie Wikström. Nya Idun was modelled on its male counterpart, Sällskapet Idun. In her justification for founding Nya Idun, Curman wrote: "Why should not we women too, regardless of our different political and religious views, be able to come together for a mutual exchange of ideas in common intellectual, artistic and literary interests?"

Curman was also involved in several other issues. Among other things, she was a member of the board of the Friends of Handicraft, founded in 1874, a member of the Swedish Dress Reform Association, a member of the board of the Stockholm Reading Room on Kungsholmen 1898–1900, a member of the board of the Samfundet för unison sång ('Society for Unison Singing') 1908–1915, and was on the local board in Stockholm of the Riksföreningen för svenskhetens bevarande i utlandet ('National Association for the Preservation of Swedishness Abroad') 1918–1924. She became honorary president of the latter association in 1928. She was also an accomplished pianist, publishing her booklet of compositions in 1897 and was one of those calling for the establishment of Mother's Day in 1919. She was awarded the Illis quorum and the Friends of Handicraft Medal.

== The Curman receptions ==
In the 1880s and 1890s, the "Curman receptions" in the Curman villa on Floragatan in Stockholm were a household name among scientists, artists and writers. She wanted to bring together many different kinds of people for fruitful conversations and discussions. As a rule, two evenings were organised in the autumn and three in the winter for the salon. The social aspect was considered the most important; food offerings were light. The Curman receptions featured people such as poet Carl Snoilsky, artist August Malmström, mathematician Sofya Kovalevskaya, composer Laura Netzel, writer Viktor Rydberg, Bjørnstjerne Bjørnson and social debater Ellen Key.

== The Curman villas and the Stångehuvud nature reserve ==
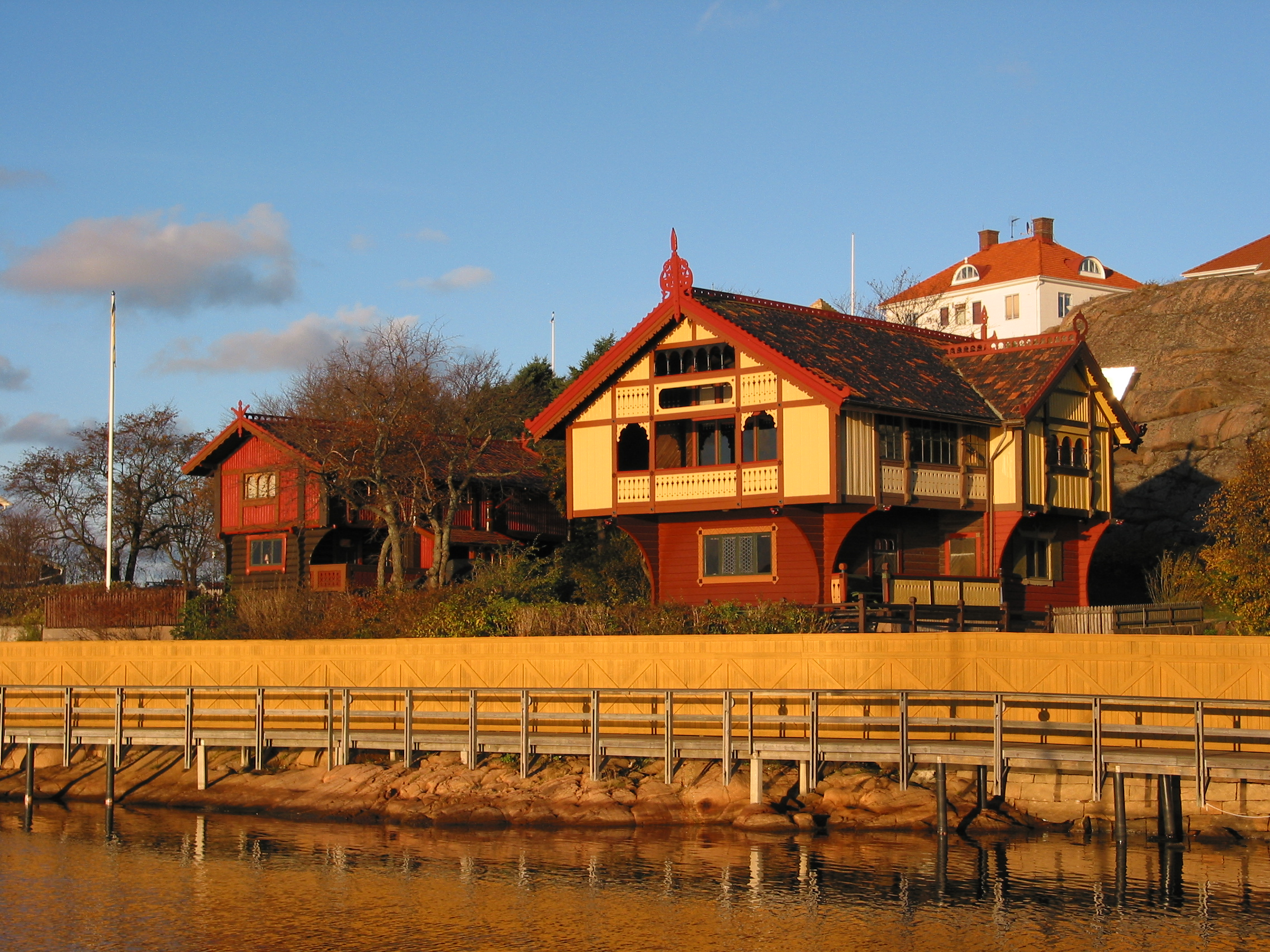
Curman villas in Lysekil

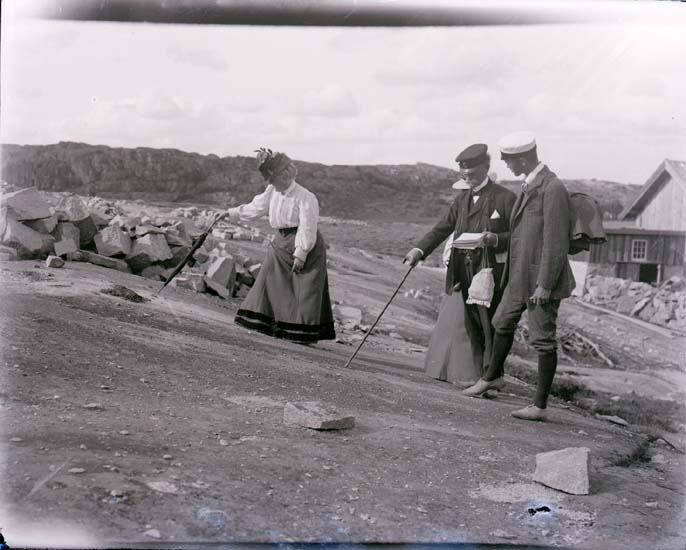
Curman indignantly points to petroglyphs mistreated by stonecutters in Brastad, Sweden ca. 1907. Credit: Hugo Hallgren

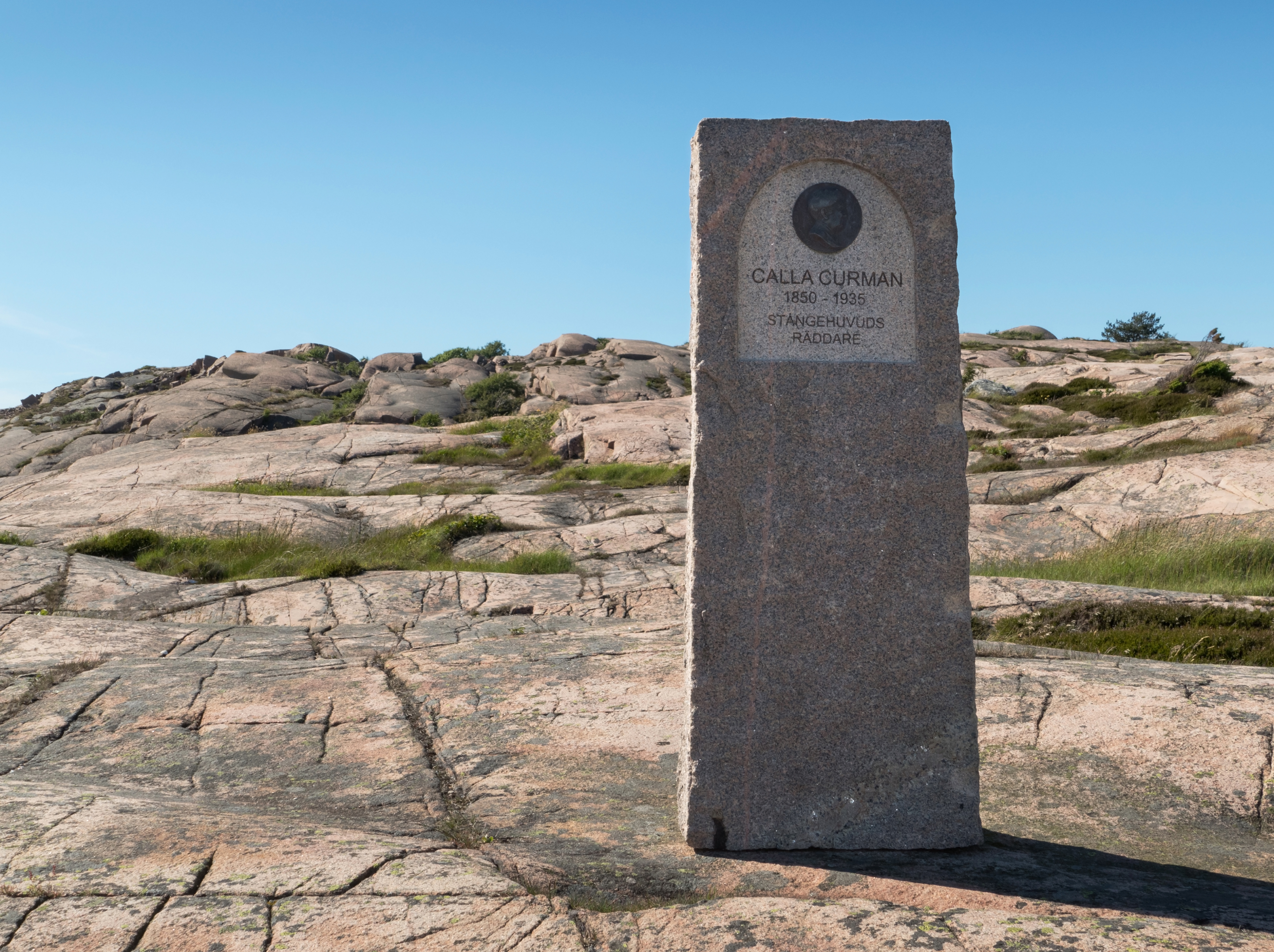
Calla Curman memorial at Stångehuvud

In 1878–1880, the Curmans built two villas in the Dragestil style, also known as the Curman villas, which are characteristic features of Lysekil's townscape. They returned to Lysekil every summer and Calla took long walks in the countryside, becoming particularly fond of Stångehuvud a short distance outside the town, where the granite cliffs were sculpted by ice. By the early 1870s, quarrying had begun in Stångehuvud, which was hard on the Bohuslän cliffs at the time, with no regard for the area's unique nature. During summer after summer in the last decades of the 19th and early 20th centuries, Curman saw the area increasingly nibbled away. The advance of the stone industry in Stångehuvud troubled her to her core. She would spend many evenings wondering what could be done to stop the quarrying and spare the mountains from further destruction.

But this was easier said than done since the stone industry provided many jobs and a large income for the stone industry. Curman wrote several letters to the newspapers and the leaders of Lysekil, asking firstly that stone mining should be stopped, but if it had to continue, it should be done more systematically and with greater care. However, her views were not heard. To prevent the destruction of the beautiful scenery at Stångehuvud, from 1916, with great persistence and lengthy negotiations with the landowners, she gradually began to buy up piece after piece of land, often through agents so as not to reveal that it was the same person who was the buyer. By 1920 she had managed to buy up the whole area, a total of about 18 hectares (44 acres), costing 55,000 Swedish kronor. On 3 November 1925, she donated the area to the Royal Swedish Academy of Sciences to preserve it for all time. At the same time, the Carl and Calla Curman Foundation was set up to keep a watchful eye on Stångehuvud and to determine what care and maintenance measures should be taken to preserve and nurture the area. A memorial stone to Calla Curman's work is erected on Stångehuvud with the caption Stångehuvuds räddare 'Stångehuvud's savior'.

Through donations, she also made a major lasting contribution to Stockholm. Curman donated money to the Swedish History Museum and the Egyptian Museum in Stockholm, medical research, a German professorship at Stockholm University, the Bergian Garden and an agricultural school. Like her mother Sofie, she also devoted herself to charitable work for individuals.

== Death ==
Curman died on 2 February 1935 in Stockholm and is buried at Norra begravningsplatsen.

== Works ==
- Rem, Eli (1897). Fyra sånger för en röst och piano (in Swedish). Stockholm: Abr. Hirschs Förlag.
- Til en norsk Dame fra hendes svensk Veninde (in Swedish). Originally published in Jyllands-Posten. Lysekil. 1906 [1906-08-19]. OCLC 187173438.
  - Bref till en norsk dam från hennes svenska väninna (in Norwegian). Stockholm: Svanbäck. 1907. OCLC 186706201.
- Minnen (in Swedish). Stockholm: Norstedt. 1926. OCLC 186149827.
  - Minnen (in Swedish) (New ed.). Stockholm: Dejavu. 2012. ISBN 9789174514056.
- I landsflykt: berättelse. Iduns romanbibliotek (in Swedish). Vol. 94. Stockholm: Idun. 1931. OCLC 187173431.
