= Åberg =

Åberg is a surname of Swedish origin. In English-speaking countries it may appear as Aberg or Aaberg. Åberg, Aberg or Aaberg may refer to various people:

== Åberg ==
- Arvid Åberg (1885–1950), Swedish track and field athlete
- Bengt Åberg (1944–2021), Swedish motocross racer
- Ernst Åberg (1823–1907), Swedish physician
- Georg Åberg (1893–1946), Swedish athlete who competed mainly in the long and triple jump
- Göran Åberg (born 1956), Swedish curler
- Gurli Åberg (1843–1922), Swedish actress
- Helena Åberg (born 1971), Swedish Olympic freestyle swimmer
- Inga Åberg (1773–1837), Swedish actress and opera singer
- Jan Håkan Åberg (1916–2012), Swedish organist and composer
- Johan Åberg (born 1972), Swedish songwriter and producer
- Lars Wilhelm Åberg (1879–1942), Finnish engineer and businessman
- Lasse Åberg (born 1940), Swedish actor, musician, film director and artist
- Ludvig Åberg (born 1999), Swedish golfer
- Majken Åberg (1918–1999), Swedish discus thrower
- Pontus Åberg (born 1993), Swedish hockey player
- Sandro Key-Åberg (1922–1991), Swedish poet and novelist
- Tekla Åberg (1853–1922), Swedish teacher and school director
- Ulrika Åberg (1771–1852), Swedish ballerina
- Victoria Åberg (1824–1892), Finnish artist
- Wendla Åberg (1791–1864), Swedish dancer

== Aberg ==
- Aleksander Aberg (1881–1920), Estonian wrestler
- Judith Aberg, American physician

== Aaberg ==
- Philip Aaberg (1949–2026), American jazz pianist and composer
- Sean Aaberg (born 1976), American artist

== Fictional characters ==
- Alfons Åberg, character created by the author Gunilla Bergström

== See also ==
- Hugo Åbergs Memorial, harness event for trotters that is held annually in Malmö, Sweden
