= Wallinska skolan =

Swedish girls' school

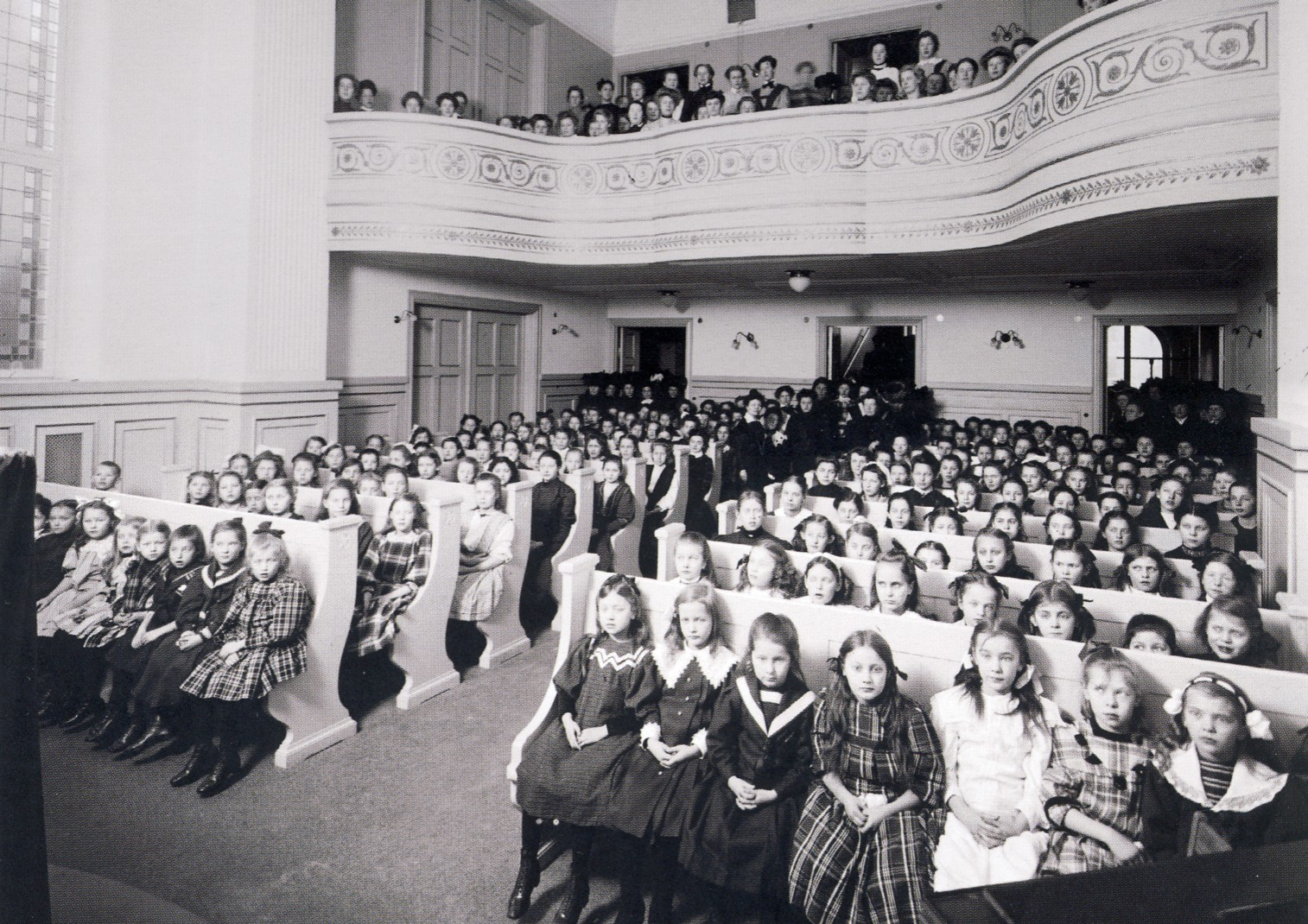
Prayer hall in Wallinska skolan (1908)

Wallinska skolan (Wallin School) or Wallinska flickskolan (Wallin Girls' School), was a girls' school in Stockholm, Sweden. Active from 1831 to 1939, it was one of the first five schools in Sweden to offer serious academic education and secondary education to female students. In 1870, it became the first gymnasium for females in Sweden, and in 1874, it became the first girls' school that was permitted to administer the Studentexamen to female students.

== History ==
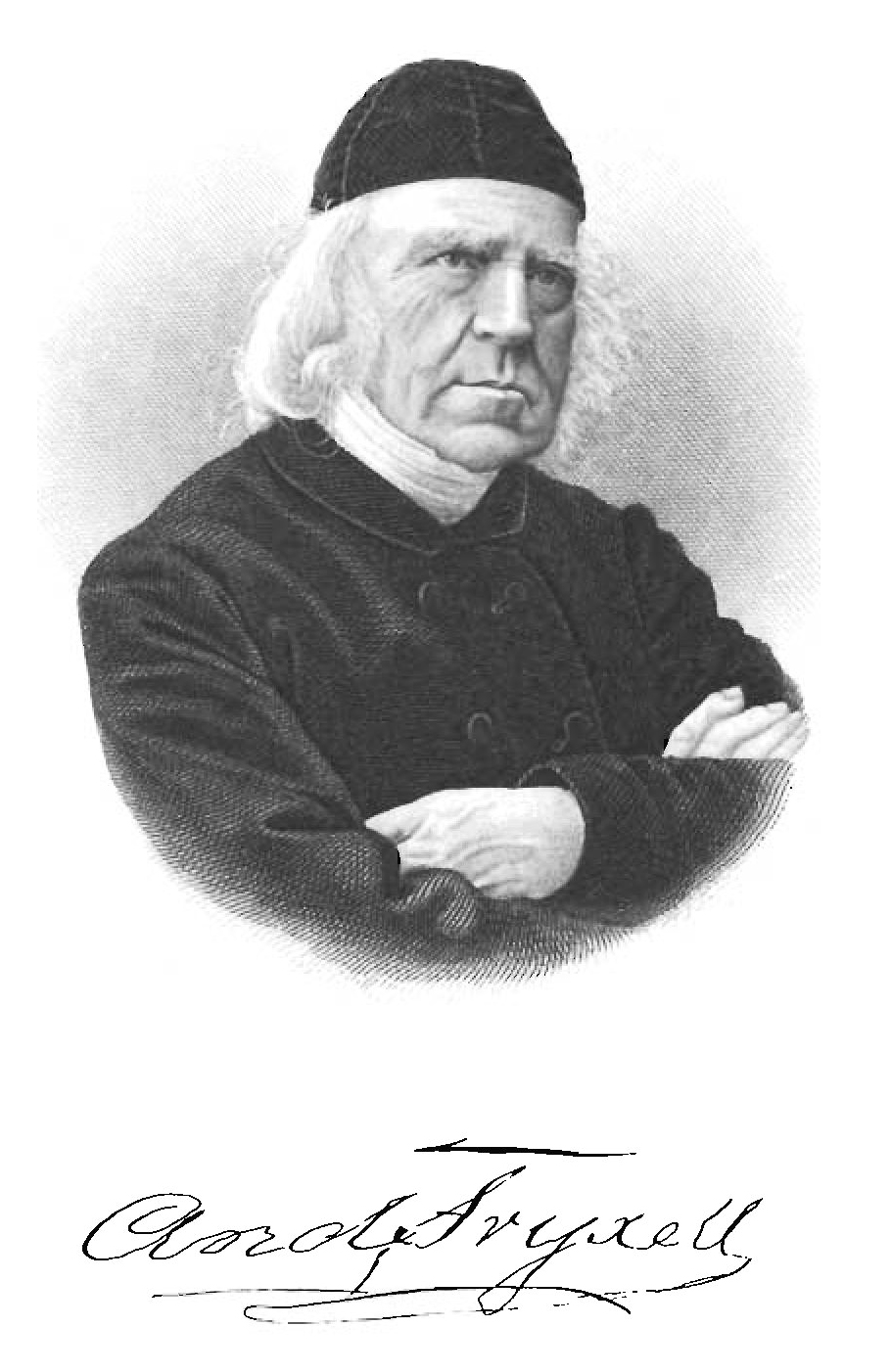
Anders Fryxell (1878)

=== Foundation ===
The Wallinska skolan was founded in 1831 by the historian Anders Fryxell upon suggestion by the bishop and writer Johan Olof Wallin. The school was founded out of intellectual discontent over the contemporary shallow education of females in the contemporary finishing schools, such as Bjurströmska pensionen . Wallin convinced Fryxell that girls should be educated "with higher ambitions than to learn to speak French and play the klavér", because also women had the right to serious studies, and that it would surely prove to be needed in the future, which is why they were in need of a school "similar to that of the state Gymnasium (school) for boys".

=== Pioneer institution ===
At the time of the introduction of compulsory elementary school for both genders in Sweden in 1842, it was one of only five schools in Sweden to provide serious academic secondary education to females, and it was the first of that kind in the capital: the others being Societetsskolan (1786), Fruntimmersföreningens flickskola (1815) and Kjellbergska flickskolan (1833) in Gothenburg, and Askersunds flickskola (1812) in Askersund. Of these five schools, Askersunds flickskola and Wallinska skolan were considered to offer the highest academic quality to their students, and the Wallinska skolan was the most progressive of them all. It was the fourth girls' school in Sweden and the first in the capital of Stockholm to give female students an almost equal education to that of boys, in accordance with a structured pedagogic method. It was not an uncontroversial project, but Anders Fryxell had, reportedly, "the, for a principal of a radical pioneer school, invaluable talent to be able to handle parents".

Wallinska skolan was managed by two principals in parallel, one male and one female. Upon its foundation, the school had five teachers and a student number of 33: the subjects were Christianity, Swedish, German, natural science, French, history, handicrafts and drawing. It was partitioned in four classes with the two first divided in four home works groups and the two later classes in three. The course was expansive and scientifically developed for its time. The school year was long, with only a month's summer vacation and two weeks of Christmas vacation. The school gradually changed over the years by continuously adjusting itself to the contemporary progressive ideals of women's education, reforms which were generally controversial, but always introduced nonetheless.

Wallinska skolan was to remain the only serious secondary education school for girls in the capital until the 1860s, when the Royal Seminary was founded and the other girls' schools in Stockholm, notably Åhlinska skolan which was founded by Karin Åhlin in 1847, started to reform into serious secondary schools.

=== University Preparation Institution ===
By two reforms in 1870 and 1873, women in Sweden were given access to university education. To make this possible, access to the other levels of education was necessary, and the same year, Wallinska skolan became the first gymnasium for females in Sweden: it formed its first gymnasium class in 1870, and two years later, the first of its students at this level, Johanna Levysohn, took her Studentexamen at the male Stockholm gymnasium.

In 1874, because it met with the demands stated in the Girls' School Committee of 1866, Wallinska skolan was given governmental support. The same year, 1874, it became the first girls' school in Sweden to win the right to administer the studentexamen for its students. It was one of five girls' schools in Sweden to be given this right prior before 1900, followed by Ateneum för flickor (Ateneum for Girls), Lyceum för flickor (Lyceum for Girls) in 1882, Åhlinska skolan in 1894 and Tekla Åbergs högre läroverk för flickor in Malmö in 1898, the first outside the capital.

The reforms of the 1870s signified a breakthrough for the school, by then known as "Wallinium": the number of students increased from 70–80 to 250 during the 1870s, and Wallinska skolan long became nationally known as "the school where you could take the studentexamen" and continue to university. The progressive reforms and expansion during the later half of the 19th-century were credited to Evelina Fahnehjelm (principal 1872–1898), who was given the Ilis quorum in recognition. In 1914, the number of students were 373, and the number of teachers 35.

=== Dissolution ===
In 1939, the school was united with the Åhlinska skolan to the co-educational Wallin-Åhlinska gymnasiet (Wallin-Åhlin Gymnasium) as a result of the new educational reform.

== Notable students ==
A great number of notable personalities have been students at the school during its existence. Among them were: Karolina Widerström, Rosalie Roos, Ellen Fries, Anne Charlotte Leffler, Emilia Broomé, Anna Paues, Ellen Roosval von Hallwyl, Ebba von Eckermann, Fredrique Paijkull, Lydia Wahlström, Maria Cederschiöld, Gulli Petrini, Dr. Ellen Sandelin, Anna Lisa Andersson, Hanna Rydh, Naima Sahlbom, Elsa Stuart-Bergstrom, and Elsa Thulin.

== Other sources ==
- Wallinska skolan i Nordisk familjebok (andra upplagan, 1921)
- Wallinska skolan 1831-1931 (1931) Libris 1365131
- Friman, Helena; Söderström, Göran (2008). Stockholm: en historia i kartor och bilder. Monografier utgivna av Stockholms stad. Nordqvist, Sven (illustratör). Stockholm: Wahlström & Widstrand. Libris 10736828. ISBN 978-91-46-21843-2
- Elever i icke obligatoriska-skolor-1864-1970. Promemorier från SCB. 1977
- Sara Backman Prytz: Borgerlighetens döttrar och söner. Kvinnliga och manliga ideal bland läroverksungdomar, ca. 1880−1930 2014
- Gunhild Kyle (1972). Svensk flickskola under 1800-talet. Göteborg: Kvinnohistoriskt arkiv. ISBN
