= Alida Rossander =

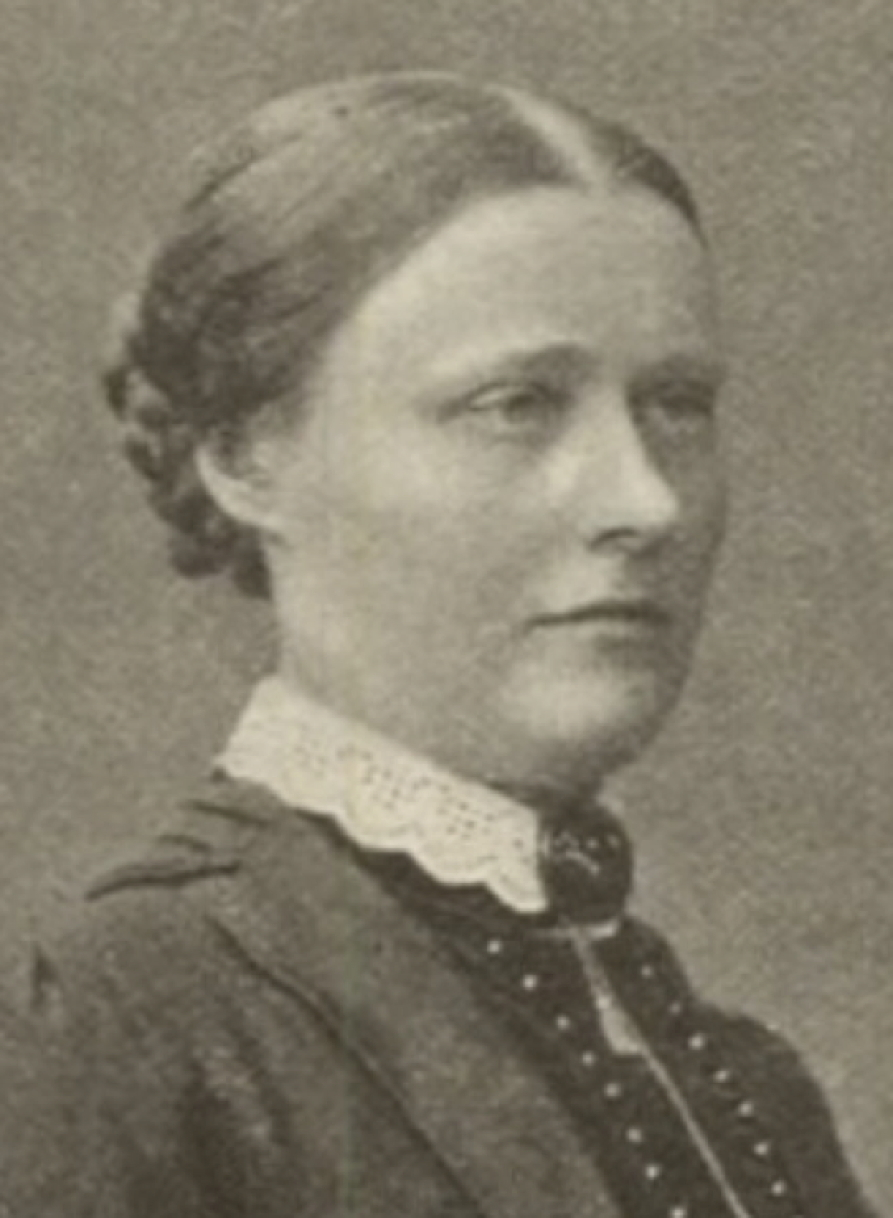

Alida Rossander (1843-1909) was a Swedish educator, mathematician, women's rights activist and bank clerk official. In 1864, she became the first female bank clerk official in Sweden.

She and her sister Jenny Rossander were students of the pioneering Lärokurs för fruntimmer in 1859, were among the first teachers employed when it was transformed to the Högre lärarinneseminariet in 1861, and were fired by Jane Miller Thengberg when the school was given an organized structure in 1864, and in 1865 they became the founders and managers of the Rossander Course.
