= Lorenz von Numers =

Swedish-speaking Finnish journalist (1913–1994)

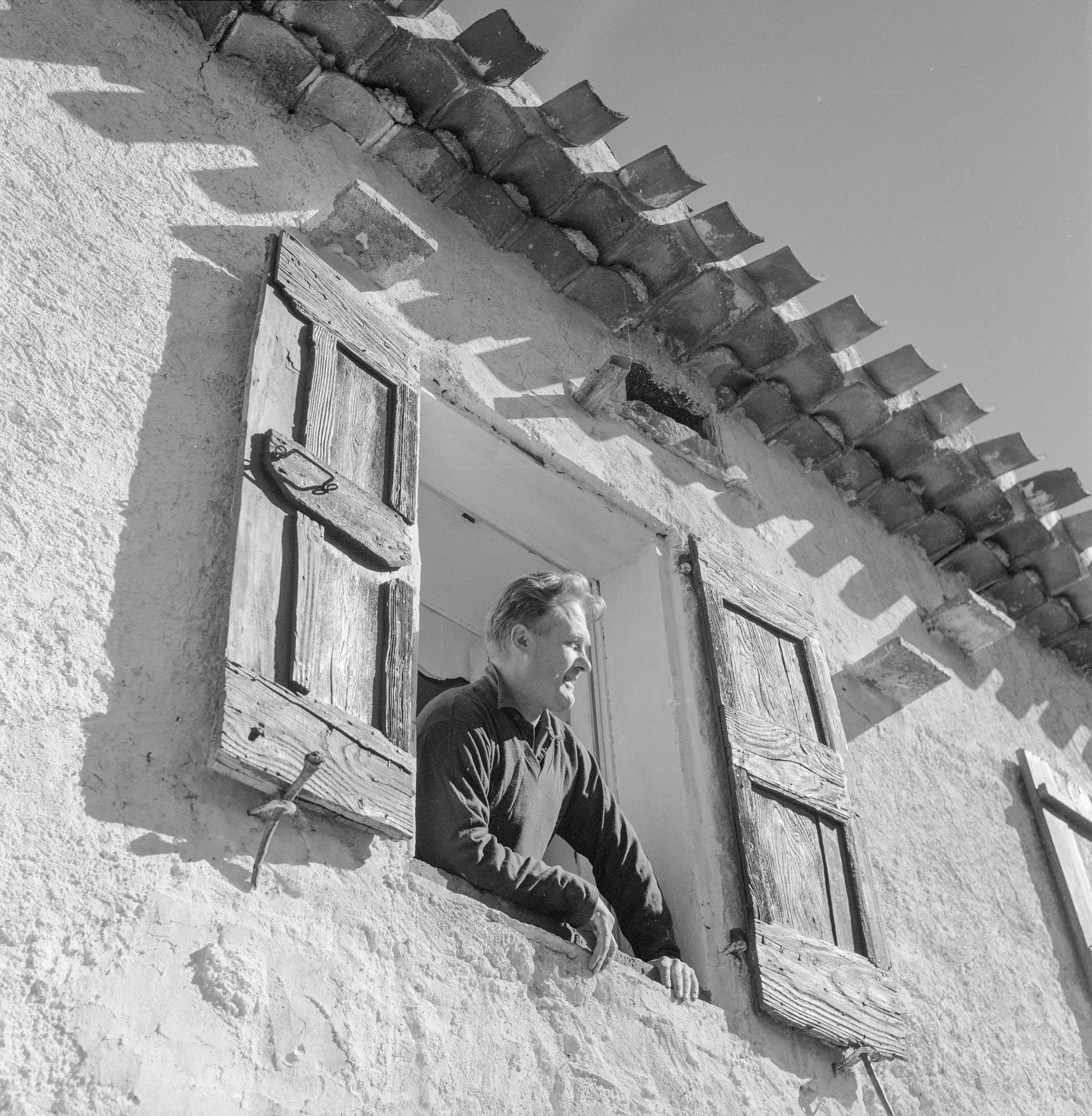
- Lorenz von Numers in his house in Pyrenees. (Photo: Göran Schildt)
- Born: Lorenz Torbjörn Gustaf Gunnar von Numers; January 25, 1913; Turku, Finland
- Died: July 19, 1994 (aged 82); Angers, France
- Occupations: Journalist, translator, author
- Years active: 1934–1994
- Spouse: Aimee Sundman (1939-1948) Cecile Jeanne Pages (1949-)

Lorenz Torbjörn Gustaf Gunnar von Numers (25 January 1913, Turku – 19 July 1994, Angers, France) was a Finland-Swedish journalist, translator and author.

== Biography ==
Lorenz von Numers' parents were Gösta Gunnar Helge von Numers, who was a railway guard and poet, and Hildur Ellen Elisabet Engberg. Von Numers graduated from Brändö Svenska Samskolan in 1933 and studied at the University of Helsinki's Department of Humanities between 1934 and 1936.

Von Numers was editor of the newspaper Nyland from 1934 to 1937. During the Spanish Civil War, he served as an observation officer from 1937 to 1939, for an international committee tasked with securing the border in the Pyrenees between France and Spain. He was head of department for the news agency Finlandia from 1939 to 1941 and 1944 to 1946 and a front-line correspondent in Finland during the Continuation War from 1941 to 1944.

In 1947, von Numers moved to Sweden. He was editorial secretary for OBS! in Stockholm from 1948 to 1952 and editor at Svenska Dagbladet from 1955 to 1959. From 1959 onwards he lived in France. From 1967 he worked at the Finnish embassy in Paris on various assignments, working as a cultural attaché from 1972 and as a press counsellor from 1975 to 1978.

Von Numers made his debut with the poetry collection Svart harnesk (1934). His early work was influenced by writers such as Erik Axel Karlfeldt and Frans G. Bengtsson. After publishing the poetry collection Havslyktan (1942), von Numers turned to prose, primarily writing novels and free essays. As a writer, he is most appreciated for his lush historical novels, such as Snäckans bröder (1946) about the French medieval poet François Villon, and has also made a name for himself as a travel writer. In addition to this, he also wrote poetry, causerie, essays, and short stories.

As a translator, he has translated works by André Gide, Henri Alain-Fournier, Marcel Aymé, Jean Froissart and Joseph Bédier's Tristan and Isolde, among others.

== Bibliography ==
- 1934 – Svart harnesk (poetry)
- 1936 – Porträtt med blomma (poetry)
- 1942 – Havslyktan (poetry)
- 1943 – Tveskäggs krumelurer
- 1945 – Ordkynne
- 1946 – Snäckans bröder (about François Villon's life)
- 1948 – Spel med fyra knektar
- 1951 – Konungariket Mallorca
- 1952 – Månen är en säl
- 1953 – Basturesan
- 1954 – Lara
- 1959 – Den druckna myran
- 1964 – Drottningens handelsmän (historical novel)
- 1964 – Lansarna vid Jordan
- 1967 – Vinet som kaniken drack och andra essayer
- 1968 – Oting
- 1977 – Valda dikter
- 1980 – De hemliga rummen
- 1981 – Paschan i onåd : bidrag till kännedomen om Bonneval Ahmet Pascha
- 1985 – Havets karavaner

=== Translations (selection) ===
- Tapio Hiisivaara: I fält med JR 10: en verklighetsskildring från Finlands vinterkrig (original title: Olinhan siellä minäkin) (Helsingfors, 1941). Lindqvist, 1941, under the title En av många
- Mika Waltari: Mikael Ludenfot: hans ungdoms öden och äventyr i många länder intill år 1527 (original title: Mikael Karvajalka) (Wahlström & Widstrand, 1949)
- Robert Louis Stevenson: Sjöresa på landbacken (original title: An inland voyage) (Wahlström & Widstrand, 1953)
- Jacques Decrest: Tre unga damer i Wien (original title: Les trois jeunes filles de Vienne) (Wahlström & Widstrand, 1953)
- Albert Henry Rasmussen: Slukad av Kinas drake (original title: Tatt av Chinas drage) (Wahlström & Widstrand, 1954)
- Franska mästarnoveller (original title: Les vingt meilleures nouvelles françaises) (Natur & Kultur, 1958)
- Angel de Lera: Skräckens trumpeter (original title: Los clarines del miedo) (Bonnier, 1960)
- Alain Robbe-Grillet: I labyrinten (original title: Dans le labyrinthe) (Bonnier, 1962)
- Michel de Montaigne: Om fåfänglighet och andra essayer (Natur och kultur, 1962)
- Juan Goytisolo: I bakvattnet (original title: La resaca) (Bonnier, 1963)
- Jean-Paul Sartre: Orden (Bonnier, 1964)
- Nathalie Sarraute: De gyllene frukterna (original title: Les fruits d'or) (Bonnier, 1964)
- Voltaire: Karl XII (original title: Histoire de Charles XII) (1970)

== Awards ==
- 1937, 1965 - Society of Swedish Literature in Finland-award
- 1964 - the Elsa Thulin translator award
- 1982 - Tollander-award
