= Anna Sandström =

Swedish feminist

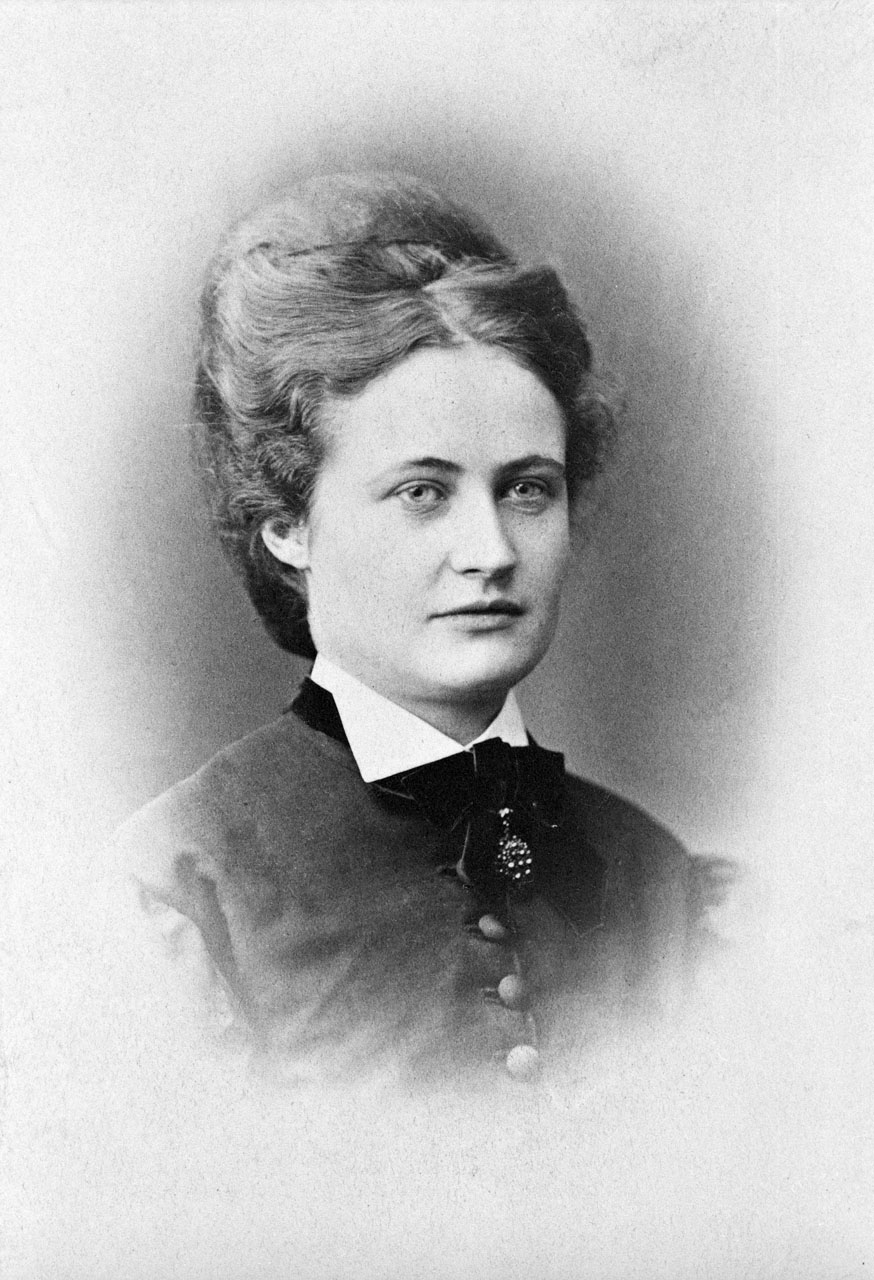
- Born: Anna Maria Carolina Sandström; 3 September 1854; Stockholm, Sweden
- Died: 26 May 1931 (aged 76); Stockholm, Sweden
- Occupations: Feminist, reform pedagogue, educational pioneer

Anna Maria Carolina Sandström (3 September 1854 – 26 May 1931) was a Swedish feminist, reform pedagogue and a pioneer within the educational system of her country. She is referred to as the leading reform pedagogue within female education in Sweden in the late 19th century.

== Early life ==
Anna Sandström was born in Stockholm, Sweden, to administrator Carl Eric Sandström and Anna Erica Hallström. After her father's early death, she was brought up as a foster child of Colonel Hjalmar Hagberg. Because of her foster father's profession, she followed him around the country on his military posts and was therefore often forced to interrupt her education. She was educated at the Royal Normal School for Girls (Statens normalskola för flickor) and the Royal Seminary (Högre lärarinneseminariet) in Stockholm, where she graduated as a teacher in 1874. By the time of her graduation, females had very recently been given the right to attend university in Sweden, but she was not given the opportunity to attend university herself.

She was employed as a teacher at the Åhlinska skolan girls' schools from 1874 to 1882 and then at Södermalms högre läroanstalt för flickor in Stockholm from 1881 to 1883. She was not comfortable in the girls' school environment and she was critical of the education they normally provided their students. She continued to educate herself and studied history, French and Swedish literature and Latin as an autodidact. She also studied the publications of reforming pedagogues.

== Educational reformer ==
In 1880, Sandström debuted in the public educational debate with her article Gifva våra flickskolor berättigade anledningar till missnöje? (Do our girls' schools give us just cause for discontent?) in the feminist publication Tidskrift för hemmet created by Sophie Adlersparre. Under the male pseudonym of Uffe, she criticized stiff and formalized education and its strict focus on languages. French was the traditional main distinction of an educated female academic while Latin had the same position for a male.

In 1882, she published Realism i undervisning eller Språkkunskap och bildning under the same pseudonym, which aroused great attention. This is seen as the starting point which connected the various critical reform pedagogues of the late 19th century in Sweden and united them to an educational reform. The author was assumed to be a respected male academic, and by referring to "Uffe" (which was in fact herself), Sandström founded the a literary discussion group named Uffe-kretsen (The Uffe circle) of educational reformers, active in 1883–1892. Leading members were Fredrique Runquist, Fridtjuv Berg, Hjalmar Berg, Sigfrid Almquist, Sofi Almquist and Nils Lagerstedt. The group founded two co-education schools, published radical articles and teaching books, arranged international school meetings with similar groups in Denmark and Norway, founded the Pedagogiska biblioteket (Pedagogical Library) as well as the Pedagogiska sällskapet (The Pedagogue Society), which replaced Uffe-kretsen in 1892.

Sandström was a board member of the Pedagogiska sällskapet (Pedagogue Society) in 1892–1902. She was a frequent and leading participant in the national Flickskolemöten (Girls' School meetings) for teachers and reform pedagogues, which were held in Sweden in 1879-1901 to discuss issued regarding female education, which were managed by girl schools until the introduction of co-education.

== Educational career ==
In 1883, Sandström co-founded the co-educational school Nya skolan in Stockholm with her colleague Fredrique Runquist: from 1886 named Anna Sandströms skola ( Anna Sandström School), and was its principal from 1883 to 1926. She founded this school with reference to her then unidentified male pseudonym Uffe, whose ideas had become very praised. It was her goal to realize the ideas she had presented in her publication of 1882 in this school, and she used it to experiment with her educational ideas through empirical experience.

Sandström disliked girls' schools and was a strong promoter of co-education. She was a great believer in individual education; to find and develop every students personal talent and to do so by making each subject "alive" through literature. She believed that learning should be by experience rather than to memorize ideas from books.

In 1900, she founded the Anna Sandströms högre lärarinneseminarium (Anna Sandström Higher Teacher Seminar) for female teachers in Stockholm, which she managed in 1900–1926. This was meant as an alternative to the Royal Higher Teacher Seminary (Kungliga Högre Lärarinneseminariet).

The ideas of Sandström which she tried out in her own schools, were to have a great impact upon the reform of the public colleges in 1905 and 1928 and the reformed educational plans of 1919. In 1904, she was given the Swedish royal medal Illis quorum meruere labores (commonly called Illis Quorum) for her long, "successful work for the education of the female youth".

== Editor ==
In 1883 together with F. Lars Hökerberg (1851–1924), she co-founded the radical paper Verdandi, which she edited from 1883 to 1929. The paper presented itself as the house organ for her male pseudonym Uffe, author of her widely popular and reform publication Realism i undervisning eller Språkkunskap och bildning from 1882: Uffe was unknown to be her and thought to be an actual male academic. The paper became the leading educational paper in Sweden until the 1920s and frequently published articles from leading educational pioneers.

== Feminist ==
Sandström belonged to the circle centering around the founders of the women's rights movement the Fredrika Bremer Association, including Sophie Adlersparre, in whose paper she published her first article as a reformer in 1884. She was an early member of the women's association Nya Idun, founded in 1885, and one of its first committee members. During the 1890s, she was a known participator in the gender debate through her articles in the paper of the Fredrika Bremer Association. She represented the then radical line of the feminist movement which saw men and women as unique individuals and defended their right to develop their personalities in opposition of traditional gender roles: she opposed the Difference feminism represented by Ellen Key which demanded equal rights for men and women because their differences would complement and benefit society, and instead demanded equal rights from the viewpoint that men and women were born equal and naturally different only as individuals rather than as men and women, and that it was a waste of human resources to create psychological differences through artificial gender roles instead of helping individuals develop their personal talents and ambitions. As such, she became one of the leading figures within Swedish feminism. Her articles were also printed and sold separately. In her 1898 article Under hvilka förutsättningar kan kvinnorörelsen blifva af verklig betydelse för kultur och framåtskridande? ('In which circumstances could the women's movement be of true importance for culture and progress?'), in which she stated that equality between the sexes was not only necessary for the personal progress of every individual; it was also necessary to make happy marriages possible and develop a rich society. During her later years, she focused more upon the questions regarding female education in particular rather than gender issues in general.

== Other sources ==
- Sven Grauers, Anna Sandström (1854–1931) – en svensk reformpedagog, 1961
- Erik Wellander, Anna Sandström som pedagogisk nydanare. (Nordisk tidskrift 1933).
- Annika Ullman Sofi Almqvist, Anna Sandström, Anna Ahlström och deras tid, 2001
- Gunhild Kyle (1972). Svensk flickskola under 1800-talet. Göteborg: Kvinnohistoriskt arkiv. ISBN
- Anna M C Sandström, urn:sbl:6348, Svenskt biografiskt lexikon (art av Annika Ullman), hämtad 2014-04-25.
