= Hilda Elfving =

Swedish educator

Hilda Vilhelmina Elfving (8 September 1827 – 8 January 1906) was a Swedish educator.

Elfving was born and died in Stockholm. She was the daughter of Johan Isak Elfving, lector at Stockholms gymnasium. She was the royal governess of Princess Louise of Sweden in 1857–1860.

Her father participated in the Course of Education for Women (Swedish: Lärokursen för fruntimmer), which was held in Stockholm in 1859–1861 and replaced with the Högre lärarinneseminariet, where she became the first principal in 1861–1863. As principal, she made a trip to study the educational methods in Germany, Switzerland and France on governmental funds in 1862.

During her period as principal, the school was described as still having the informal atmosphere common in girls' school, and her student Lilly Engström was later to describe her:

"She attended our lessons with her sewing basket, and was always surrounded with an atmosphere of still joy and harmony.".

She was succeeded as principal by Jane Miller Thengberg in 1863. She married the merchant Pontus Ferdinand Kobb and moved to Gothenburg in the same year.
