= Hilda Caselli =

Swedish reform educator

Hilda Wilhelmina Josefina Caselli, or Casselli (1836 – 22 August 1903) was a Swedish reform educator. She played an important role in the debate of educational issues and women's education in Sweden in the late 19th century. She served as principal of the Statens normalskola för flickor and vice principal of the Högre lärarinneseminariet, and became the founder of the regular national girls' school meetings, Flickskolemöte, in 1879.

== Biography ==
Hilda Caselli was born and raised at Gammelsbo in Ramsberg in Västmanland, were her father was employed as the manager of an estate. Her father became blind in 1859, and the family moved to Uppsala, were her brothers studied at the university: similar to many females of her generation, she and her sisters were in contrast educated in very little more than to manage a household at home. She found this unfair, which reportedly affected her. As an adult, she educated herself in the governess training course at the newly founded pioneer female seminary of Jane Miller Thengberg in Uppsala, the Klosterskolan, and made a study trip to England in 1862.

Hilda Caselli was employed as a teacher at Statens normalskola för flickor in Stockholm in 1864; she served as its principal, as well as the deputy principal of the Högre lärarinneseminariet, from 1868 until 1903. As a person, Caselli was described as a very strict, firm and authoritative person, who aroused great respect among her students, but also as just and competent. She was also reportedly beautiful, though, as it was said, this was not very evident because of her strict behavior and her Pince-nez.

Caselli made herself known for her engagement within women's educational issues. She is known as the founder of the Flickskolemöte (Girls' School Meeting). The national Flickskolemöte was regularly arranged from 1879 until 1901 as a counterpart to the regular Läroverksmöte, were the teachers and principals of the nations Gymnasium (school)s for males gathered to discuss reforms, difficulties, needs, mistakes and successes concerning their activity: the purpose of the Flickskolemöte was for representatives of the nation's secondary educational girls' schools to do the same. Caselli had been inspired to this after having participated in meetings discussing the need of reform for girls' education arranged by the Tidskrift för hemmet in 1875. In 1877, a board was created including Caselli, Therese Gyldén, Sofi Almqvist and Ellen Key, and in 1879, she arranged the first nationwide Flickskolemöte. Six more were to be held every four years until 1901, which were to have a significant role for the development of women's education.

Caselli was a member of the government committee of female education, the Flickskolekommittén 1885 (Girls' School Committee of 1885) and as such, together with Sophie Adlersparre, the first female member of a government committee in Sweden.

In 1896, she was given the Illis quorum.
