= Emilie Risberg =

Swedish writer and reform pedagogue

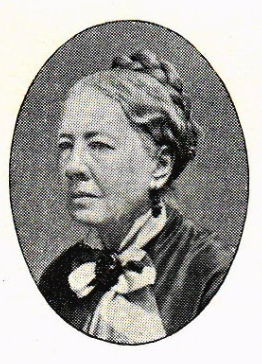
Risberg in 1880

Emilie Charlotta Risberg (10 June 1815, in Skara – 11 November 1890, in Örebro) was a Swedish writer and reform pedagogue. She founded the Risbergska skolan (Risberg School) in Örebro, and served as its principal in 1863-1878. Emilie Risberg is regarded as an important member of the pioneers of girl's education in the mid 19th century Sweden, who reformed the education of girls by establishing girls' schools which offered proper academic education for females, in contrast to the earlier girl's pensions shallow education.

== Biography ==
Risberg was the daughter of postmaster Benjamin Risberg and Hedvig Catharina Smedberg. She was educated at home and worked as a governess as an adult. She founded and managed a girls' school in Mariestad in 1842-1850, of which not much is known and which she herself stated was not of high quality, before she moved to Örebro.

After acquiring her own house in 1861, she could receive her students in her home, which enabled her to open her school. The school became successful, and she could gradually expand it by employing more teachers and accept more students and expand the school to more and more classes and levels without putting herself in debt. In 1863, she had 50 students and 12 teachers, of which six were male and six female. In 1874, after the universities was open to women and the government started to support the girl's schools with high enough standard to prepare its students for university, her school were among the schools given governmental support. She retired in 1878, and spent her retirement in her private apartment in her school building.

Risberg's school was upon its foundation in 1863 regarded as an important innovation: there were numerous girls' schools in Sweden, but the great majority of them were very short-term and offered a very shallow education. In the first half of the 19th century, there were a debate in Sweden about offering serious education to girls, and a new sort of girls' schools was founded which offered serious education. Emilie Risberg and her school, along with Cecilia Fryxell and Karin Åhlin, belonged to the pioneers of this reform in girls education in Sweden.

Emilie Risberg was also a writer, and her novels were quite popular, especially Rolf och Alfhild (1860) and Warnhems ros (1861).
