= Jenny Rossander =

Swedish educational reformer, mathematician, women's rights activist and journalist

Jenny Rossander (22 January 1837 – 28 August 1887) was a Swedish educational reformer, mathematician, women's rights activist and journalist. She co-founded and directed the informal evening school known as the Rossanderska kursen, which offered advanced courses in mathematics, natural sciences and Swedish for women, and contributed widely to pedagogical discourse through teaching, writing and translation.

== Biography ==
Jenny Rossander was born in Stockholm on 22 January 1837, the sixth of nine children of Erik Rossander|Erik Rossander, a physician and philosopher, and Johanna Sofia Back Rossander. After her father's early death, she supported her family from the age of twelve by working first as a seamstress for a dressmaker and then, from sixteen, as a governess. In 1859 Jenny and her sister Alida Rossander enrolled in the experimental Lärokurs för fruntimmer, an adult education course for women initiated by Per Siljeström and other progressive figures in Stockholm. There they studied under uncompensated academic tutors in subjects ranging from humanities to the natural sciences, excelling particularly in mathematics among their peers.

Contemporary observers emphasised Rossander's moral seriousness and inborn independence. In a portrayal by the memoirist Esselde, she is depicted as standing at a crossroads between conflicting forces, yet already committed to the good, combining personal pride with a readiness to accept correction. This blend of democratic convictions and openness to guidance underpinned the integrity and empathy that characterised her teaching and leadership.

Following the closure of that course in 1861 and the establishment of the Statens seminarium för bildande af lärarinnor (later Högre lärarinneseminariet), Jenny and Alida were appointed as tutors and assistant instructors despite lacking formal teaching qualifications. This role deepened Jenny’s mastery of the natural sciences and pedagogy, and brought her into contact with leading feminists such as Fredrika Bremer. In 1864 a shift to a more rigid curriculum under director Jane Miller Thengberg led to their dismissal, prompting Jenny to seek alternative appointments. She taught the sons of Per Siljeström, prepared applicants for the teacher-training seminary, and established a private teaching household at Götgatan 41 attended by children of the Wallenberg family and other acquaintances.

In October 1865 Jenny and Alida founded their own evening school, formally called Lärokurs för fruntimmer but widely known as the Rossanderska kursen. Under Jenny's directorship and backed by a board including Anna Wallenberg and Sophie Adlersparre, the school ran for seventeen years and served over a thousand women. Its curriculum emphasised mathematics, natural sciences and Swedish, eventually expanding to cover foreign languages, physiology, health, hygiene, literature and art history. Fees were modest and concessions made for students of limited means; pupils ranged in age from twelve to fifty and could attend for three years or longer, even auditing classes without submitting work.

Beyond teaching, Jenny Rossander contributed articles to the magazine Tidskrift för hemmet, a Swedish women's magazine, and to newspapers founded by André Oscar Wallenberg, advocated pedagogical reforms, and translated works by the French educator Marie Pape-Carpantier. She participated in Sweden's first girls' school conference in 1875 and served on the Swedish delegation to the inaugural international educational conference in Brussels in 1879. Her belief in the learner as an active subject within the educational process foreshadowed modern emancipatory approaches to public education. In addition, she took leadership roles in philanthropic efforts such as the Red Cross's care of wounded soldiers and the handicrafts association Handarbetets vänner.

In 1879 Rossander married Friedrich von Tschudi and moved to St. Gallen in Switzerland. Despite a happy marriage, she found the local society conservative and faced opposition from her husband's children. After his death in 1886 she returned to Stockholm to assist Anna Hierta-Retzius in establishing workhouses for poor schoolchildren. Stricken by hyperthyroidism, she died at Ersta diakonianstalt on 28 August 1887, aged fifty.

== Correspondence and views ==
In 1876–77 Rossander entered into a spirited letter-exchange with Viktor Rydberg on co-education and early marriage. She pressed that "marriage is not merely a physical union" and that women have "a higher calling than to serve as men's protectors", advocating a minimum age of 20 for brides and 21–25 for grooms. Rydberg, who favoured marriage "as near puberty as possible", remained unconvinced.

== Legacy ==
Jenny Rossander's tireless work as a teacher, writer and organiser advanced women's access to higher education in Sweden and influenced the development of teacher training and emancipatory educational theory. The Rossanderska kursen became a model for integrating rigorous scientific study into women's courses, and many of its alumnae went on to lead educational and social projects. Her translations and publications helped disseminate progressive pedagogical ideas.
