= Anna Lisa Andersson =

Swedish journalist and author (1873–1958)

Anna Lisa Andersson (3 June 1873 – 10 March 1958) was a Swedish journalist and writer. As a journalist, she was known under her signature Huglek. She was a reporter of Aftonbladet in 1907–1932.

She was the daughter of the merchant Carl Johan Andersson and Elise Katarina Sandén and educated at the Wallinska skolan. She belonged to the first women celebrity star reporters of the Swedish press. Because of her good language skills, she was often given assignments to interview foreigners in Stockholm, particularly Frenchmen, to whom she introduced herself as "Madame Andersson d'Aftonbladet".

In 1913, she was given the first scholarship from the newly founded De kvinnliga journalisternas stipendiefond ("Scholarship Fund of Female Reporters") to study the role of the press in the social work in London and Paris. During WWI, she accompanied the Red Cross to Russia and Poland. She was known to receive poor people in need of social assistance in her office and then start fundraisers through her articles.

In 1929, she became the first woman reporter to become elected to an office within the Swedish Union of Journalists.

She never married, but lived in a permanent long term relationship with the editor Helge Stark without being married to him.
