= Evelina Fahnehjelm =

Swedish educator

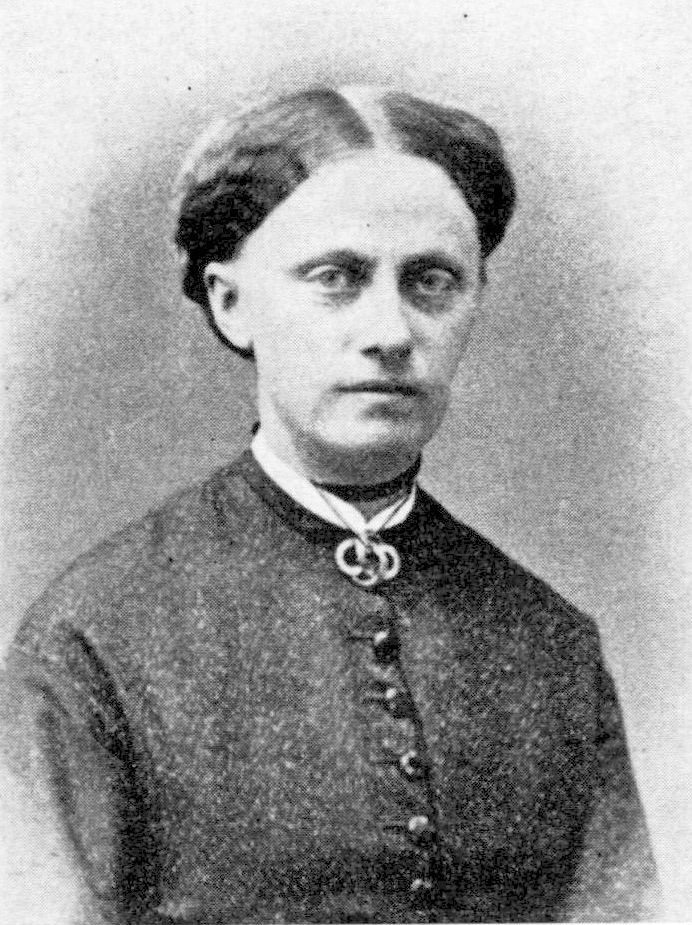
- Evelina Fahnehjelm
- Born: Evelina Wilhelmina Fahnehjelm; 25 April 1839; Stockholm, Sweden
- Died: 23 September 1898 (aged 59); Stockholm, Sweden
- Occupation: Educator

Evelina Wilhelmina Fahnehjelm (25 April 1838 – 23 September 1898) was a Swedish educator. She served as the principal of the Wallinska skolan, one of the first schools in Sweden to offer academic secondary education to females, and was credited in introducing progressive reforms to the school education. She was awarded the Swedish royal medal Illis quorum, for her significant contributions in the field of female education.

== Life ==
Evelina Fahnehjelm was born on 25 April 1839 in Stockholm, Sweden. She was one of the two daughters to Johan Vilhelm Fahnehjelm, an administrative judge, and his wife Eva Beata Giös. Her father died when she was five years old. Raised by her mother, Fahnehjelm grew up in an affluent family and was taught at home. She initially intended to become an artist but was compelled to choose a different career after contracting an ocular disease.

Fahnehjelm started her teaching career by tutoring students privately. In 1866, she began teaching at the Handicraft School in Stockholm, and later at the Pauli school in Södermalm. In 1872, she was appointed the principal of the Wallinska skolan (Wallin School) in Stockholm, one of the first schools in the country to offer academic secondary education to girls. During this time, she made progressive reforms to the school's teaching curriculum to expand the scope of female students who were entering the university. As the first girls' school in Sweden, both the classical and the scientific branches of high school education were introduced in Wallin under the supervision of Fahnehjelm.

Throughout her life, Fahnehjelm was dedicated to teaching. In 1898, she was honoured with the Swedish royal medal Illis quorum, for her significant contributions in the field of female education.

Fahnehjelm died in Stockholm, on 23 September 1898.
