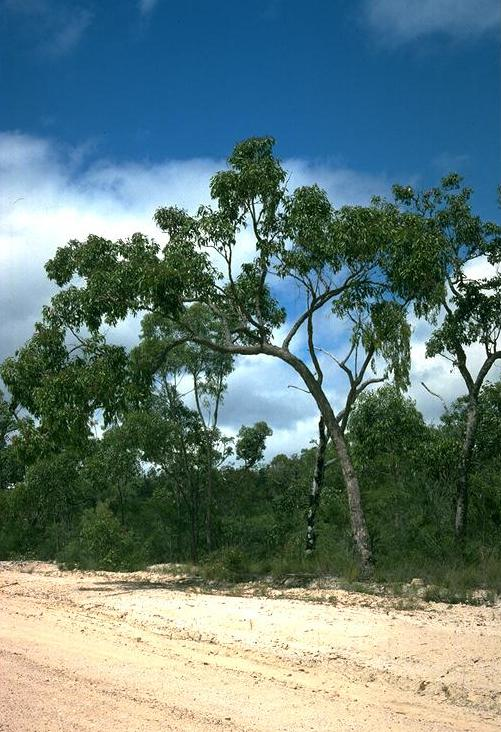
- Corymbia abergiana near Paluma

Conservation status
- Least Concern (IUCN 3.1)

Scientific classification
- Kingdom: Plantae
- Clade: Tracheophytes
- Clade: Angiosperms
- Clade: Eudicots
- Clade: Rosids
- Order: Myrtales
- Family: Myrtaceae
- Genus: Corymbia
- Species: C. abergiana

Binomial name
- Corymbia abergiana (F. Muell.) K.D.Hill & L.A.S.Johnson

Synonyms
- Eucalyptus abergiana F.Muell.

= Corymbia abergiana =

Range bloodwood

Species of plant

Corymbia abergiana, commonly known as range bloodwood or Rockingham Bay bloodwood, is a species of tree that is endemic to Queensland. It has rough bark on the trunk and larger branches, smooth bark on the smaller branches, lance-shaped adult leaves, flower buds in groups of seven, creamy white flowers and barrel-shaped fruit with a very thick rim.

== Description ==
Corymbia abergiana is a tree that typically grows to a height of 3–15 metres (10–49 ft) and forms a lignotuber. It has tessellated, coarsely fibrous, grey-brown to red-brown, bark on the trunk and larger branches, smooth greyish brown bark that is shed in small flakes on the smaller branches. Young plants and coppice regrowth have glossy green leaves that are paler on the lower surface, egg-shaped to elliptical or lance-shaped, 80–135 mm (3.1–5.3 in) long and 20–45 mm (0.79–1.77 in) wide. Adult leaves are arranged alternately, glossy dark green above, much paler on the lower surface, lance-shaped to broadly lance-shaped, 80–152 mm (3.1–6.0 in) long and 20–64 mm (0.79–2.52 in) wide on a petiole 13–40 mm (0.51–1.57 in) long. The flower buds are arranged on the ends of branchlets on a branched peduncle 5–38 mm (0.20–1.50 in) long, each branch usually with seven usually sessile buds. Mature buds are barrel-shaped, 21–34 mm (0.83–1.34 in) long and 18–26 mm (0.71–1.02 in) wide with a very thick rim and the valves enclosed. The seeds are dull to semi-glossy red-brown with a terminal wing.

== Taxonomy and naming ==
The range bloodwood was first formally described in 1878 by Ferdinand von Mueller who gave it the name Eucalyptus abergiana and published the description in his book, Fragmenta Phytographiae Australiae. In 1995, Ken Hill and Lawrie Johnson changed the name to Corymbia abergiana. The specific epithet (abergiana) honours Ernst Åberg.

== Distribution and habitat ==
Eucalyptus abergiana grows in forest on hills and gentle slopes in near-coastal areas of North Queensland from near Mareeba to near Paluma.

== Conservation status ==
This eucalypt is classified as "least concern" under the Queensland Government Nature Conservation Act 1992.

== See also ==
- List of Corymbia species
