= Rossander Course =

Female seminary in Stockholm, Sweden, 1865–1882

The Rossander Course or Rossanderska kursen, also called Fröknarna Rossanders lärokurs för fruntimmer ("The Misses Rossander Courses"), and Jenny Rossanders Lärokurs för fruntimmer ("Jenny Rossander's Learning Course for Women"), was a female seminary in Stockholm, Sweden. It was founded by the sisters Jenny Rossander and Alida Rossander in 1865 and played an important part in the history of the developing women's education in contemporary Sweden.

== History ==
In 1859, the Lärokurs för fruntimmer ("Learning Course for Women") was founded in Stockholm after the Herthadiskussionen ("Hertha Discussion"), about women's legal status and right to education which was caused by Fredrika Bremer's novel Hertha. The courses proved so popular that a permanent Female seminary, the Royal Seminary, was founded in 1861, employing many of the teachers of the Learning Course.

In 1865, the Rossanderska kursen or Rossander Course was founded, inspired by its predecessor. The Rossander Course was founded by the sisters Jenny Rossander (1837–1887) and Alida Rossander (1843–1909), and named after them. Jenny Rossander was a personal friend of Fredrika Bremer and a contributor of the Tidskrift för hemmet, where she agitated in favor of the view that education for women would benefit society when they became mothers and raised their children: Alida Rossander was a pioneer as the first female bank official when she became employed at the Stockholms Enskilda Bank the year prior.

The Rossander Course was organized in the same manner as its predecessor and role model, Learning Course for Women. The school was ruled by a board composed of Rossander, Fredrika Limnell, Anna Wallenberg and the noblewoman Ebba Lind af Hageby. Among its teachers were some of the teachers previously engaged at the Learning Course for Women and Royal Seminary, such as professor Alfred Fock, Louise Sundén, Ebba Gregerson, professor Lorentz Dietrichson, Frans Hultman, doctor Christian Lovén, Emil Key as well as the Rossander sisters themselves. The subjects were the same as in the Learning Course for Women: religion, natural science, mathematics, history, grammar, literature, French, personal hygiene, and drawing, but in contrast to its predecessor, it also offered language, which had been excluded by Learning Course for Women because it was the only serious subject normally provided by conventional girl schools. The students were divided in "students" (who studied with the purpose of graduating) and "listeners" (who wished to hear the lectures for recreational reasons), and the method of education were lectures, home assignments and interrogations. The course was almost free, with only an almost symbolic fee, used to finance the upkeep of the localities.

The Rossander Course was popular and mentioned as a valuable opportunity for adult women to complete their education, particularly female teachers. Many students were to become well known figures in Swedish society, such as the feminist Ellen Key, the educators Eugenie Steinmetz, Hilda Myrberg and Hildur Djurberg, and the suffragist Anna Whitlock.

In 1879, Jenny Rossander married the Swiss doctor baron Friedrich von Tschudi and left the school, but her sister Alida Rossander managed the school until it was closed in 1882.
