= Albertina Carlsson =

Swedish zoologist (1848–1930)

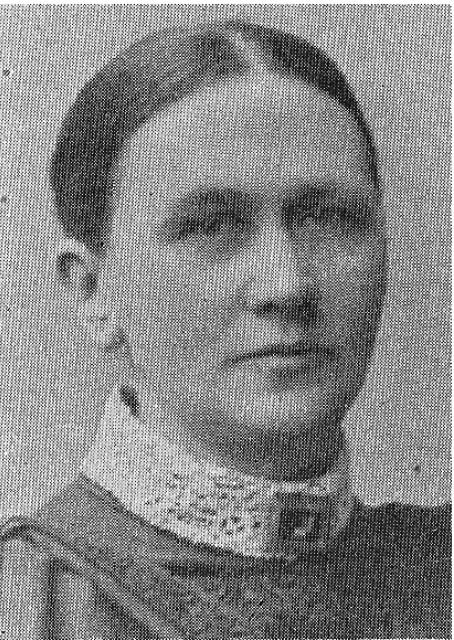
- Born: 12 June 1848; Stockholm
- Died: 25 December 1930
- Education: Royal Seminary; Stockholm University
- Scientific career
- Fields: Zoology

Albertina Carlsson (12 June 1848 – 1930) was a Swedish zoologist and teacher. She is referred to as the first Swedish woman to have performed scientific studies in zoology. She was awarded an honorary doctorate by Stockholm University in 1927.

== Life ==
Carlsson was born on 12 June 1848 in Stockholm. Her parents were tailor Anders Petter Carlsson and Anna Maria Jönsson. She married Carl Oscar Nelson and had 5 children. She was given private tuition and then educated at the Högre lärarinneseminariet in Stockholm, 1865–1868. She was employed as a teacher at the Paulis elementarläroverk för flickor ('Pauli Elementary For Girls') in 1870–81 and at Södermalms högre läroanstalt för flickor ('Södermalm Educational Institute for Girls') in 1881–1907. She taught for thirty-seven years in total.

From 1880 onward, Carlsson studied zoology at the Zootomycal institute at the Stockholm University. She was encouraged in her research by morphologist Wilhelm Leche. She produced around 30 larger and smaller scientific works, mainly about the area of comparative anatomy, which were published in Swedish, German and British journals. Carlsson's research was particularly focused on the systematic position and relation between different species of mammals. Her first research was on the morphology of waterbirds, and when it was published as a forty-four page monograph Beiträge zur Kentniss der Anatomie der Schwimmvögel in 1884 she was awarded the Flormanska priset of the Royal Swedish Academy of Sciences. She went on to publish further research on vertebrate morphology, phylogenetics, systematics, and embryological anatomy. She was awarded an honorary doctorate by Stockholm University in 1927.

Carlsson died in Stockholm on 25 December 1930. She was aged 82.
