= Åhlinska skolan =

School in Stockholm, Sweden

Coordinates: 59°20′18.47″N 18°2′57.18″E

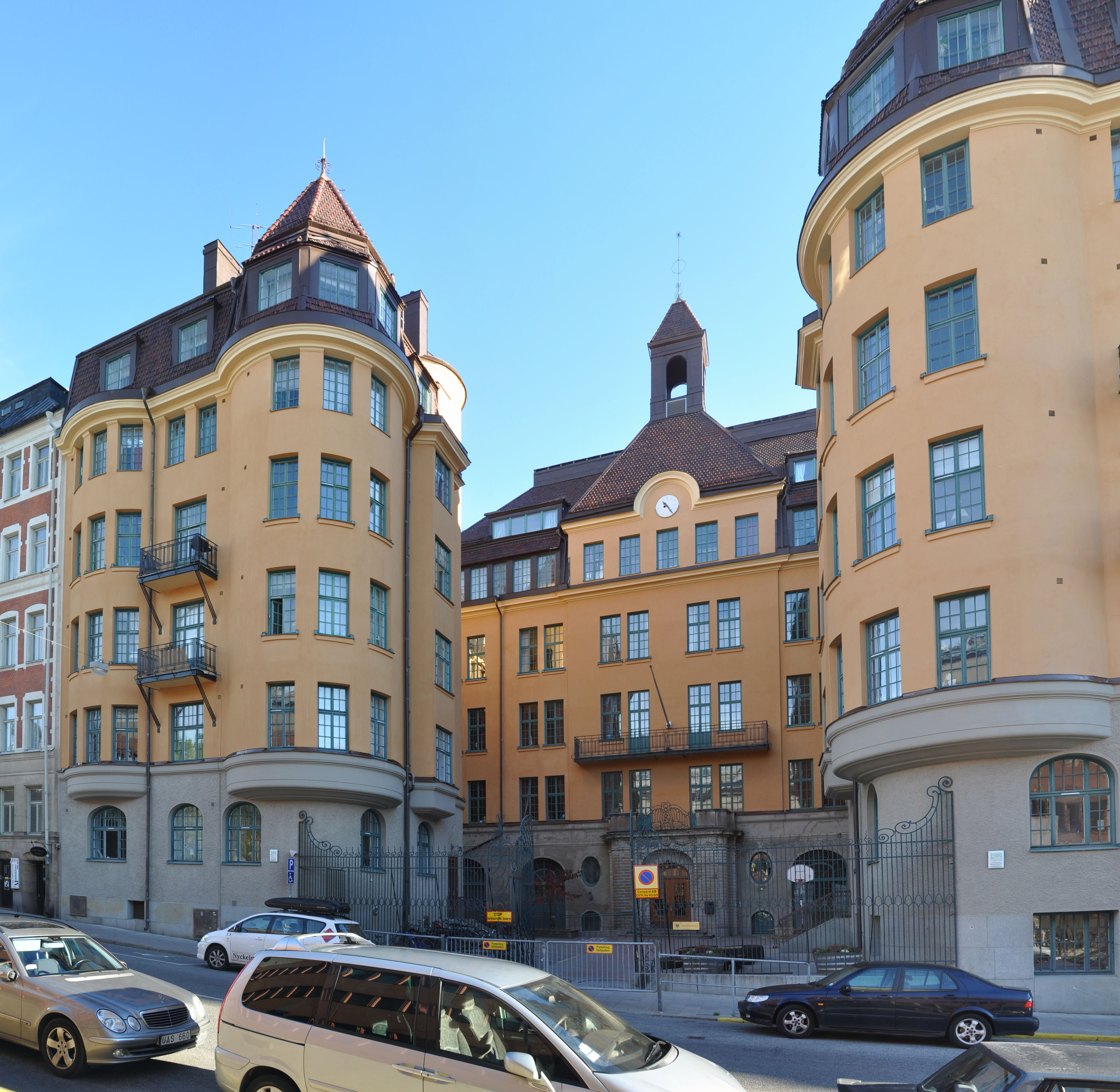
The former buildings of Åhlinska skolan on Dalagatan 16-18 in Stockholm. Today site of Lilla Adolf Fredriks skola

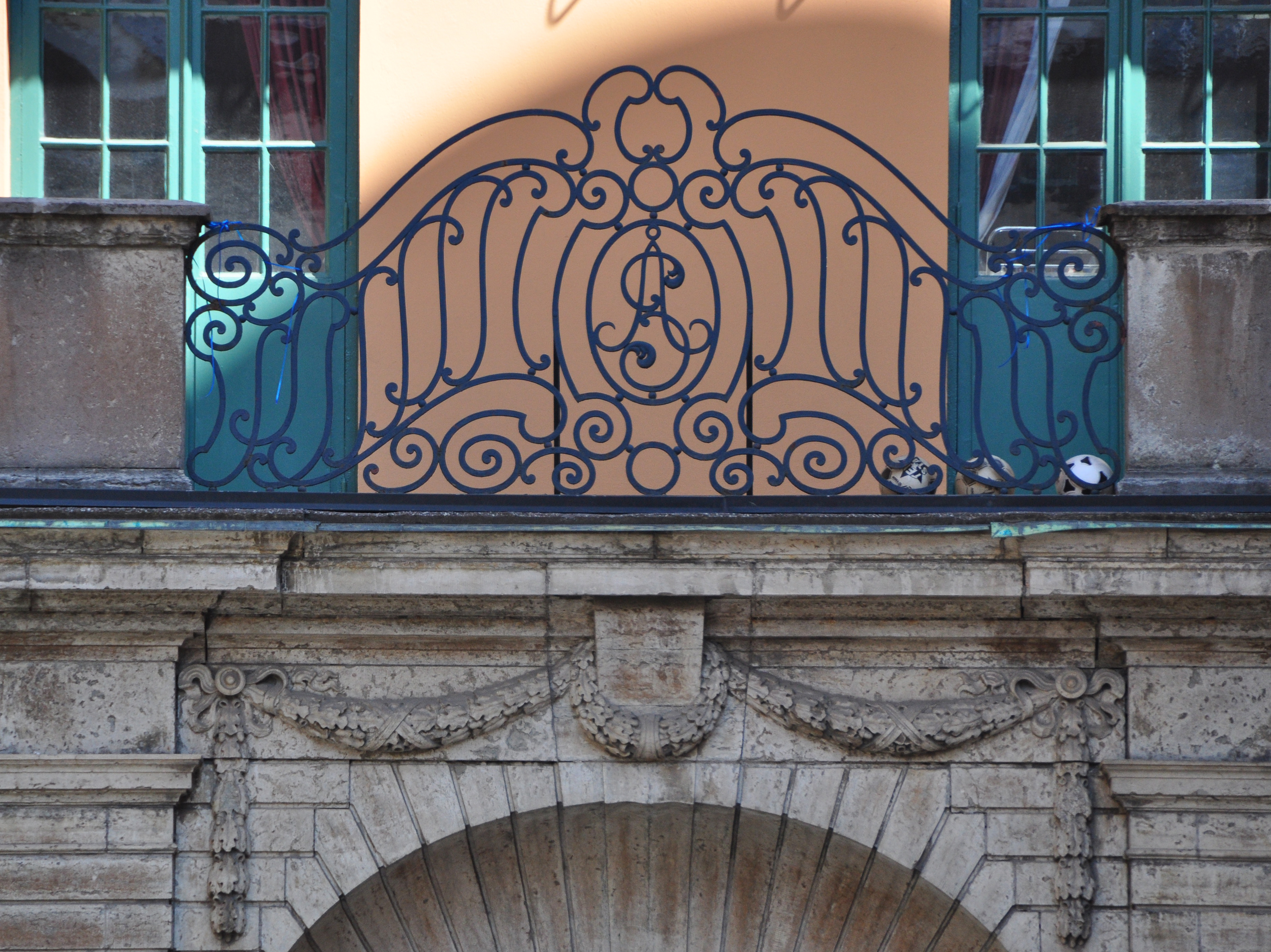
The monogram of Åhlinska skolan can still be seen on the old building.

Åhlinska skolan (Åhlin School), or Åhlinska flickskolan (Åhlin Girls' School), was a girls' school in Stockholm, Sweden. Active from 1847 to 1939, it was one of the first schools in Sweden that offered serious academic education to female students.

== History ==
The school was founded by Karin Åhlin in 1847. It was managed as a private girls' school, initially with only Åhlin and her sisters as teachers, and expanded from 14 students in 1847 to 45 in 1857, changing localities and expanding its activity as the number of students grew. Eventually, it also included a co-educational primary education school.

In 1891, it became a gymnasium for females, and in 1894, it was given the right to administer the studentexamen for its students. It belonged to the first four girls' schools with this right, after Wallinska skolan in 1874, Ateneum för flickor (The Atheneum for Girls), and Lyceum för flickor (The Lyceum for Girls) in 1882. In 1896, the school included a seminary for female teachers. Around the year 1900, the Åhlinska skolan was the largest girls' school in Sweden, and during the 1930s, it had around 700 students.

Among its noted students were author and women's rights activist Frida Stéenhoff and poet and novelist Karin Boye.

In 1939, the school was united with the Wallinska skolan to form the co-educational Wallin-Åhlinska gymnasiet (Wallin-Åhlin Gymnasium) as a result of the new educational reform.
