= Majken Åberg =

Swedish discus thrower (1918–1999)

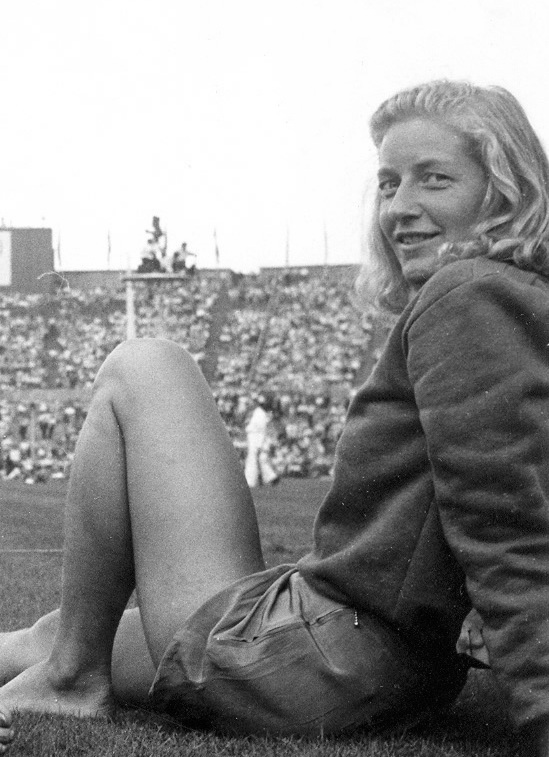

Personal information
- Born: 13 May 1918 Norrköping, Sweden
- Died: 14 February 1999 (aged 80) Kolmården, Sweden
- Height: 1.70 m (5 ft 7 in)
- Weight: 60 kg (130 lb)

Sport
- Sport: Athletics
- Event: Discus throw
- Club: IFK Norrköping

Achievements and titles
- Personal best: 40.19 m (1948)

Majken Åberg (13 May 1918 – 14 February 1999) was a Swedish discus thrower. In 1948 she won the national championships and placed seventh at the London Olympics. Her father Arvid was an Olympic hammer thrower.
