= Karin Åhlin =

Swedish teacher, school founder (1830–1899)

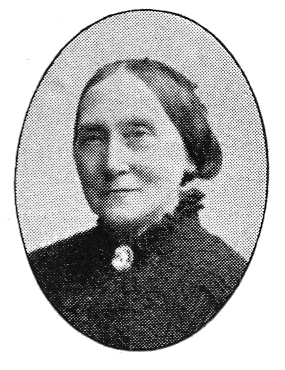
- Åhlin in 1898
- Born: 25 November 1830; Stockholm
- Died: November 30, 1899 (aged 69); Stockholm, Sweden
- Occupation: Educator

Karin Dorothea Wilhelmina Åhlin (25 November 1830 – September 30, 1899) was a Swedish educator. She was the founder and director of the Åhlinska skolan in Stockholm, and its principal from 1847 to 1899.

== Biography ==
Karin Åhlin was born and raised in Stockholm as the eldest daughter of Major Paul Pehr Åhlin and Wilhelmina Gustafva Norberg. After the death of her mother in 1847, she was left with the responsibility of raising and educating her younger siblings at the age of seventeen. At this point, the normal profession for a middle-class girl in need to support herself was that of a teacher, and she started to give lessons in her home to not only her siblings but also to paying pupils. She was an appreciated educator and was able to accept more and more pupils, some of them as guests in her home, an enterprise which gradually developed into the expanding Åhlinska skolan. During the expanding of the school, she initially employed her sisters as teachers as they reached adulthood, and eventually also educated teachers she could provide a proper salary.

Åhlin was principal of the school until 1900 and subsequently succeeded by Lydia Wahlström, who remained until 1934. Åhlin remained the school's director until her death at the age of 68 in 1899. Her work was a significant contribution to the educational system for girls, which experienced a rapid expansion in the mid-19th century from girls' schools, which only offered a shallow education, to the network of private secondary education schools for girls which covered Sweden in the 1870s, a development in which she played an important part. In 1890, Åhlin was presented with the royal medal Illis quorum meruere labores in gold for her achievements in the education of women in Sweden.

== See also ==
- Anna Sandström
