= Elsa Thulin =

Swedish translator (1887–1960)

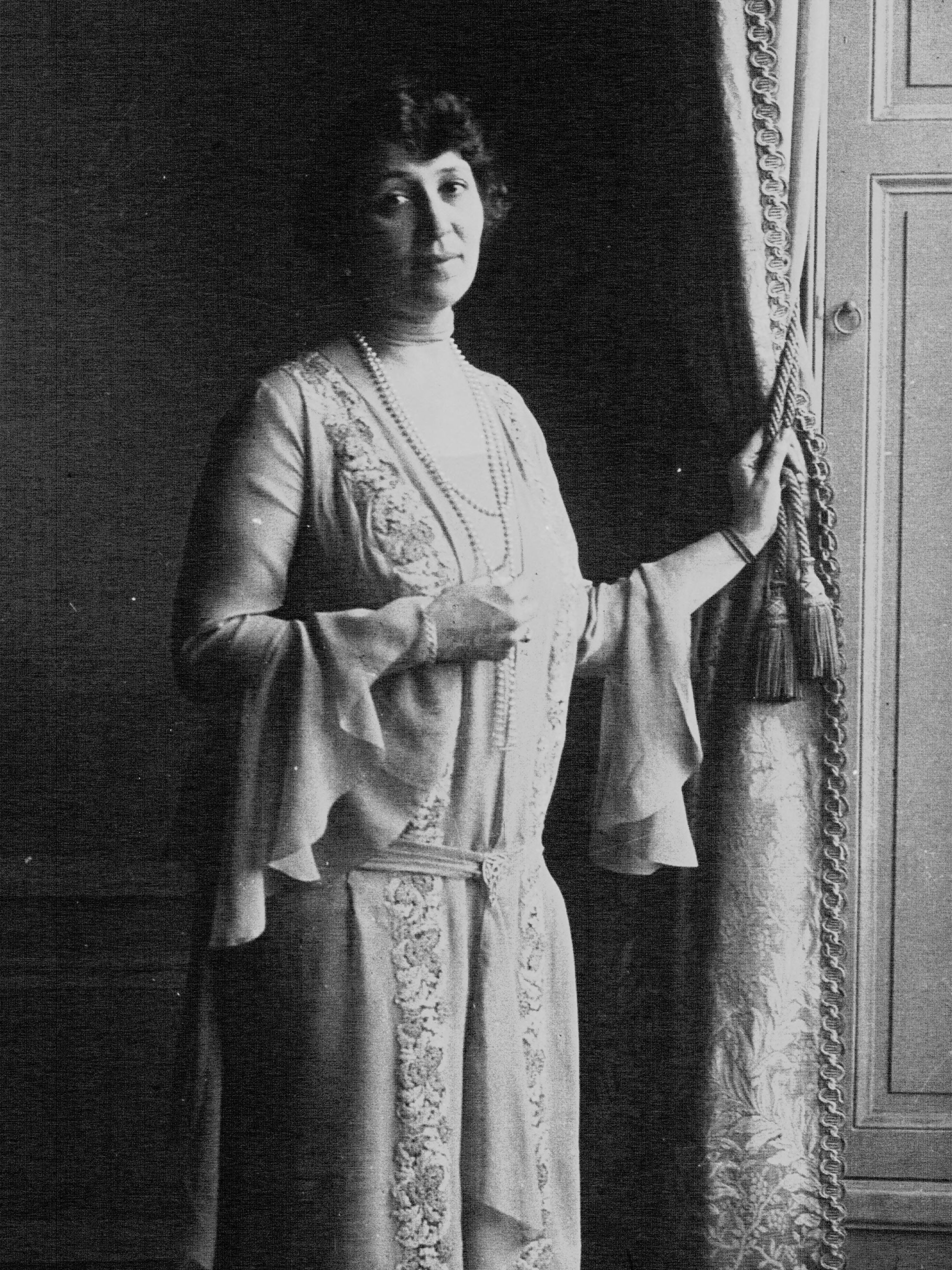
Elsa Thulin in 1927.

Elsa Harriet Thulin (née Sachs, born 19 January 1887 in Stockholm, died 29 March 1960 in Stockholm), was a Swedish translator.

== Biography ==
Thulin went to Wallinska skolan in Stockholm and studied English, German and the Romance languages at Uppsala University, earning her bachelor's degree in 1908.

She started translating in her twenties. Her main source language was French; among the works she introduced to Swedish readers were The Plague by Albert Camus, La Symphonie pastorale by André Gide, several books by André Maurois, The Psychology of Art by André Malraux and Wagner by Guy de Pourtalès. She also translated Norwegian (Trygve Gulbranssen, Sigrid Boo), Danish (Ingrid Møller, William Heinesen) and Italian (Luigi Pirandello) authors.

She was also a journalist and debater who distinguished herself during World War II by taking a strong anti-Nazi stance. A champion of improving literary translators' working conditions, she led the formation of the Swedish Translators' Association (Swedish: Svenska Översättarförbundet) in 1954 and served as its president until her death.

Thulin received the Swedish Academy Translation Award in 1956 but also gave her name to a prize herself, the Elsa Thulin Prize for literary translators, established in 1960. For her contribution to popularizing French culture in Sweden, Thulin was awarded the Ordre des Palmes Académiques and the Legion of Honour. The French daily newspaper Le Figaro paid tribute in an obituary after her death.

Elsa Thulin married John Thulin in 1910; they had two children: Ebba, born 1911, and Lars, born 1913.

== Sources ==
- Elsa Thulin at Svenskt kvinnobiografiskt lexikon
