= Ernst Åberg =

Swedish physician

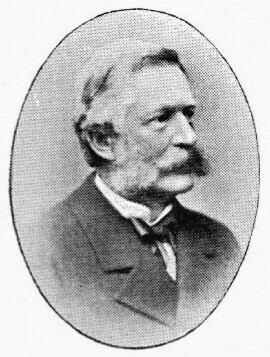
Ernst Åberg 1823-1906

Ernst Georg Åberg (1823–1907) was a Swedish physician. Born in Stockholm, Sweden in 1823, he wrote a doctoral thesis at Uppsala University in 1850 on the subject of chronic arsenic poisoning. He practiced as a doctor in Stockholm initially, but having contracted tuberculosis, around 1855 he emigrated to Argentina in search of a warmer climate. He continued to practice in Argentina, founded a gymnastics institute, and was consulted on sanitary problems by the Argentinian government on a number of occasions. He also developed an interest in the establishment of Eucalyptus in the La Plata Partido, prompting Ferdinand von Mueller to name Eucalyptus abergiana (now Corymbia abergiana) in his honour in 1878. He returned to Stockholm around 1877, later moved to Switzerland, and returned to Buenos Aires in the late 1890s. He died there in 1907.
