= Lilly Engström =

Swedish women's rights activist and civil servant

Lilly Engström (1843–1921) was a Swedish women's rights activist and civil servant. In 1890, she became the first female member of a Board of education in Sweden, after a reform the year prior, in which women were allowed to serve on governmental boards.

== Life ==
Engström graduated from the Högre lärarinneseminariet in 1864 and was a teacher at the Statens normalskola för flickor in 1864–1907. She was a member of the board of the Fredrika-Bremer-Förbundet in 1884–1920, of the Svenska lärarinnors pensionsförening (Retirement fund for female teachers) in 1873–1920, engaged in the women's suffrage movement and is regarded as a pioneer of the Pedagogiska sällskapet (Pedagogic Society). Engström was a member of the women's association Nya Idun, founded in 1885, and was one of its first committee members.

In 1889, a law reform allowed for women to become civil servants, and the following year, Engström became the first female civil servant in Sweden when she became a member of the state school education board of the Hedvig Eleonora Parish in Stockholm.
