= Arvid Åberg =

Swedish hammer thrower (1885-1950)

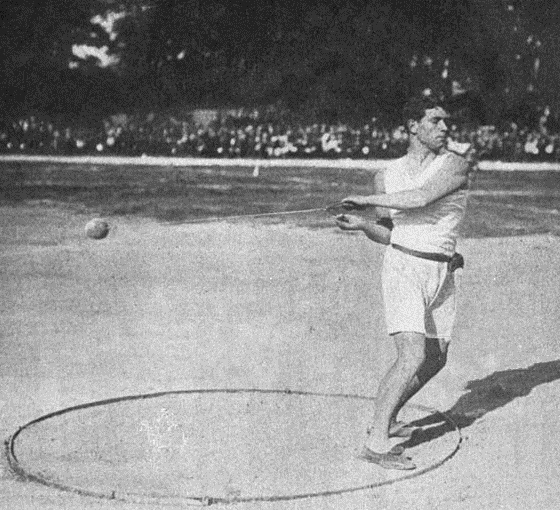
- Arvid Aberg at the 1912 Olympics

Personal information
- Born: 14 June 1885 Lofta, Sweden
- Died: 8 November 1950 (aged 65) Norrköping, Sweden

Sport
- Sport: Athletics
- Event: Hammer throw
- Club: IFK Norrköping

Achievements and titles
- Personal best: 47.85 m (1913)

Arvid Åberg (14 June 1885 – 8 November 1950) was a Swedish hammer thrower. He competed at the 1912 Summer Olympics and finished tenth. His daughter Majken became an Olympic discus thrower.
