= Judith Aberg =

American physician

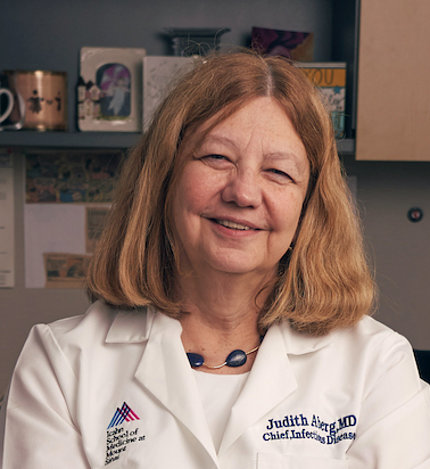
- Aberg in 2020
- Education: Pennsylvania State University; Cleveland Clinic
- Scientific career
- Institutions: Bellevue Hospital; New York University Grossman School of Medicine; Icahn School of Medicine at Mount Sinai; University of California, San Francisco; Washington University School of Medicine

Judith Aberg is an American physician who is the George Baehr Professor of Clinical Medicine at Mount Sinai Hospital. She was appointed Dean of System Operations for Clinical Sciences at the Icahn School of Medicine at Mount Sinai. Her research considered infectious diseases, including HIV/AIDS and COVID-19.

== Early life and education ==
At the age of 14, Aberg's father suffered paralysis after having an operation on his back. She has credited her experience in hospital as motivation to study medicine. She had a difficult time as an adolescent, and was kicked out of her family home as a teenager when she became pregnant. In an attempt to earn enough money for university, she worked several different jobs, including at an amusement park, as a chef, a lawn mower and a lab technician. When her partner started working as a dentist, Aberg was able to attend medical school. Aberg was an undergraduate student in medicine at the Pennsylvania State University. She completed her medical residency at the Cleveland Clinic, where she was Chief Resident. After completing her medical training, Aberg was made a fellow in infectious diseases at the Washington University School of Medicine. She became increasingly aware that young men her age were dying with AIDS, and decided to focus on HIV/AIDS. She has said she was mentored by William Powderly to improve the health outcomes of people living with HIV (PLWHA), with a focus on using clinical observations to drive basic sciences.

== Research and career ==
Aberg worked on the faculty of the University of California, San Francisco, where she oversaw the AIDS Clinical Trial Unit. In San Francisco, she started to challenge conventional practices, for example, why to keep treating PLWHA with mycobacterium avium complex if they were regaining immunity to the virus. These treatments were making people ill and impacting their quality of life. She changed treatment guidelines, and switched her focus to developing primary care. Aberg started to investigate complications associated with having HIV, including cardiovascular issues and the pathogenesis of inflammation.

In 2004, Aberg joined the faculty the New York University Grossman School of Medicine and the Bellevue Hospital. Aberg served as Director of Virology and lead of the AIDS Clinical Trials Unit. She worked to improve the outcomes of PLWHA and advocated to use evidence in decision-making.

Aberg joined the Mount Sinai Health System in 2014. In an article for The Journal of Infectious Diseases, Aberg said that women and people from other historically excluded groups feel obliged to participate in uncompensated institutional service. She called this burden "cultural taxation", and noted that alongside this tax, there were considerable gender-based salary differences.

During the COVID-19 pandemic, Aberg started to work on therapeutic strategies for people with COVID-19. She studied the effectiveness of convalescent plasma. She is a member of the panel developing NIH Covid-19 treatment guidelines.

== Awards and honors ==
- 2008 New York Linda Laubenstein Award
- 2014 George Baehr Endowed Professorship of Clinical Medicine
- 2018 Infectious Diseases Society of America Lifetime Achievement Award
- 2021 Jacobi Medallion

== Selected publications ==
- Melanie A Thompson; Judith A Aberg; Pedro Cahn; et al. (1 July 2010). "Antiretroviral treatment of adult HIV infection: 2010 recommendations of the International AIDS Society-USA panel". JAMA. 304 (3): 321–333. doi:10.1001/JAMA.2010.1004. ISSN 0098-7484. PMID 20639566. Wikidata Q37773748.
- Melanie A Thompson; Judith A Aberg; Jennifer Hoy; et al. (1 July 2012). "Antiretroviral treatment of adult HIV infection: 2012 recommendations of the International Antiviral Society-USA panel". JAMA. 308 (4): 387–402. doi:10.1001/JAMA.2012.7961. ISSN 0098-7484. PMID 22820792. Wikidata Q34289633.
- Ania Wajnberg; Fatima Amanat; Adolfo Firpo; et al. (28 October 2020). "Robust neutralizing antibodies to SARS-CoV-2 infection persist for months". Science. doi:10.1126/SCIENCE.ABD7728. ISSN 0036-8075. PMC 7810037. PMID 33115920. Wikidata Q101050468.

== Personal life ==
Aberg left her husband during medical school. He moved to Saudi Arabia and she raised her child alone.
