= Jan Håkan Åberg =

- Born: 10 March 1916; Dalarna
- Died: 8 January 2012 (aged 95)
- Occupation(s): Organist and Composer

Jan Håkan Åberg (10 March 1916 – 8 January 2012) was a Swedish organist and composer.

Born in Dalarna, Åberg worked as a cathedral organist in Härnösand. He is represented in the current Swedish Book of Psalms (1986) with two songs: In dulci jubilo and Så älskade Gud världen all.
