= Jane Miller Thengberg =

Swedish-Scottish teacher

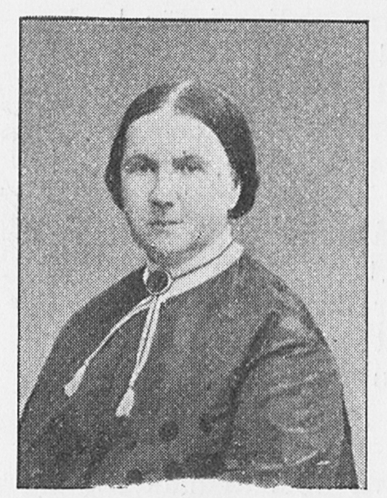
- Born: 2 May 1822; Greenock, Scotland
- Died: 22 March 1902 (aged 79); Uppsala, Sweden
- Resting place: Uppsala old cemetery
- Occupation: Educator
- Spouses: Pehr Adrian Thengberg (m. 1854–1859) Carl Julius Norrby (m. 1868–1902)

Jane Miller Thengberg (2 May 1822 – 22 March 1902) was a Swedish-Scottish teacher. She founded and managed the girls' school Klosterskolan in Uppsala from 1855 to 1863 and was the principal of the Högre lärarinneseminariet (Advanced Seminary for Female Teachers) in Stockholm from 1863 to 1868. She organized the rules of the newly founded Högre lärarinneseminariet, was an active participant in the contemporary debate about the educational system in Sweden, and is regarded as a pioneer of the education of girls and women in Sweden.

== Biography ==
Miller Thengberg was born in Greenock, Scotland to a Scotsman named John Miller (d. 1831), who was employed in the British Navy, and Christina Jansson from Sweden. In 1834, she moved to Karlstad in Sweden with her mother. As an adult, she worked as a governess in both Sweden (1845–1852) and Scotland (1852). In 1854, she married the teacher and librarian Pehr Adrian Thengberg (d. 1859) in Uppsala, where she was introduced in intellectual circles frequented by, among others, Per Daniel Amadeus Atterbom, Thekla Knös, Gunnar Wennerberg, and Malla Silfverstolpe. She participated in the contemporary debate about the education of girls and women. At this point, there were criticisms against the girls' schools in Sweden, which were considered shallow. There was also a wish to establish schools which could offer serious academic education to girls, and many girls' schools were established. Between 1855 and 1863, she founded and managed her own girls' school, Klosterskolan, which became known for its high academic standards. From 1857, it also functioned as a female seminary, where she educated adult female teachers. The Klosterskolan was regarded as a pioneer female educational institution during its short existence.

In 1863 Miller Thengberg succeeded Hilda Elfving in the position of principal at the newly established Högre lärarinneseminariet in Stockholm. She organised the institution according to her own pattern in 1864. Her rules became the target of public debate, which is said to have been caused by male teachers whom she had fired, with the support of Fredrika Bremer. Her new organisation was perceived as a great innovation and visits to the school were made from all over the country. On her recommendation, she was succeeded as director by Ernst Olbers, with Regina Pallin and Hilda Caselli as deputy directors.

Miller Thengberg was described as brusque and efficient. She was not regarded as a feminist but rather held views similar to Sophie Bolander. Although she spoke for females to be given education equal to what was given to males, she did not see it as ideal that they use this education to participate in society. She still supported the conventional idea that a woman's place was in the private life of the home.

In 1868, she married a teacher, Carl Norrby, and subsequently resigned her post. She lived with him on Gotland from 1872 to 1879, and then used her contacts to arrange a position for him in Uppsala. She continued to participate actively in the general debate on education in Sweden.

Miller Thengberg died in 1902 in Uppsala, Sweden, and is buried in Norra begravningsplatsen.
