= Gunhild Kyle =

Swedish historian (1921–2016)

Gunhild Kyle (28 August 1921 – 14 February 2016) was a Swedish historian. She was Sweden's first professor of women's history at the University of Gothenburg.

== Early life and education ==
Gunhild Karlson was born on 28 August 1921 in Gothenburg, the daughter of sales manager Gunnar Karlson and his wife, Karin (Lundstedt). She completed a master's degree in Gothenburg in 1950, became a Licentiate of Philosophy in 1970, earned her Doctor of Philosophy in 1972, and became a docent in 1979.

== Career ==
Kyle was an assistant professor at Vasa municipal girls' school in Gothenburg, and at a high school in Partille. She served as a senior lecturer at high school in Stenungsund before becoming, in 1984, Sweden's first professor of women's history at the University of Gothenburg, where she worked until 1987/1988, after which she became professor emerita. She is the author of Svenska flickskolor under 1800-talet ("Swedish girls' schools during the 19th century") (1970; thesis with the same name in 1972) and Gäst-arbeterska i manssamhället ("Guest workers in the men's society") (1979), and well as essays in various journals.

== Personal life ==
In 1946–1974, she married associate professor, Per Gunnar Kyle (1919–2006). Since 1974, she was a partner with Professor Gunnar Qvist (1916–1980). She is the mother of the historian, Doctor Jörgen Kyle (born 1950) and actor Sissela Kyle (born 1957). Kyle died on 14 February 2016 in Stockholm.

== Selected works ==
- Svensk flickskola under 1800-talet., 1970
- Två studier i den svenska flickskolans historia, 1972
- Kvinnorna i männens samhälle. Ur den officiella debatten om kvinnans villkor i Sverige. ([Edited by] Gunhild Kyle, Gunnar Qvist.)., 1974
- Klassbildning och kvinnobildning.
- Gästarbeterska i manssamhället : studier om industriarbetande kvinnors villkor i Sverige, 1979
- Kvinnan under 1900-talet - konflikten mellan produktion och reproduktion. , 1980
- Kultur kring kvinnobildning
- Kvinnors liv i det svenska samhället : tio forskningsprojekt stödda av Riksbankens jubileumsfond, 1981
- Kvinnohistoria. Del 1 : Kvinnohistoria i forskning och skolundervisning, 1981
- Kvinnorna i Skövde : kvinnor i familj och arbete, i politik och kulturliv i en svensk småstad 1880-1930
- Borgerligt kvinnligt och borgerligt manligt i försvarsrörelsen : en studie i Skövde Tidning - Västgöta Korrespondenten 1870-1920.
- En doktorsavhandling om den rgelementerade prostitutionen.
- Geijer, liberalismen och kvinnornas medborgarrätt
- Deskriptivt om kvinnlig rösträtt.
- Genrebilder av kvinnor : en studie i hemmens hierarkier, 1983
- "Hvarför skola kvinnor vänta?"
- Tulipanarosor : reformverksamhet och reformverklighet, 1984
- Borgarens fru och arbetarens hustru
- Männen som stödde kvinnokampen ...
- Giftermål gjorde myndig kvinna omyndig
- Arbetets döttrar. 2, Sociologiska och historiska synpunkter, 1986
- Två skrankor : om kvinnor och utbildning kring sekelskiftet, 1986
- Arbetsdelning, tidsfördelning och kunskapstilldelning : om kvinnors och mäns samhällsvillkor
- Fyra uppsatser om nordiska kvinnliga forskarpionjärer : en kommentar
- Kvinnor och kunskap
- Manliga strukturer och kvinnliga strategier : en bok till Gunhild Kyle, 1987
- Kvinnoliv i staden : II
- The marginalized majority, 1987
- Skrivande kvinnor, 1987
- Genrebilder av kvinnor : en studie i sekelskiftets borgerliga familjehierarkier., 1987
- Kvinnor och kunskap, 1987
- Arbetsdelning, tidsfördelning och kunskapsfördelning : om kvinnors och mäns samhällsvillkor., 1987
- Handbok i svensk kvinnohistoria, 1988
- Gästarbeterska i manssamhället, 1990
- The division of work between the sexes and its social consequences.
- Handbok i svensk kvinnohistoria, 1992
- Kvinnoprofiler, 1993
- Kring franska revolutionen
- Rätt till röst.
- Kvinnobildning i historiskt perspektiv , 1994
- Mary Wollstonecraft : Mary Wollstonecraft in Sweden 1795-1995 in Uddevalla 2-6 september 1995, 1995
- Kunglig änka på Gripsholm - drottning Maria Eleonora.
- Married and Degraded to Legal Minority The Swedish Married Woman during the Emancipation Period, 1858–1921 , 2004
- Handbok i svensk kvinnohistoria , 2006
- Kvinnoprofiler, 2006
