= Tekla Åberg =

Swedish educationalist (1853 - 1922)

Tekla Åberg (26 October 1853 – 17 November 1922) was a Swedish teacher and school director. She was a pioneer for girl's education in Sweden and was the founder and director of the first grammar school for girls outside Stockholm, Tekla Åbergs högre allmänna läroverk för flickor.

== Life ==
Tekla Åberg was born into a wealthy family on 26 October 1853, in Åmål, Dalsland, Sweden. She was the daughter of mill owner Johan (Janne) Åberg, and his wife, Britta Johanna Oldenskjöld. Åberg's several siblings died in infancy, and her mother died in childbirth. Her father remarried a widow, who had five children of her own. All the children of the Åberg family were taught at home.

In 1886, at the age of 32, Åberg enrolled as a private student and graduated from college. In 1888, she took over the Fru Elise Mayers högre läroverk för flickor girls high school, and renamed it to Tekla Åbergs högre läroverk för flickor (Tekla Åberg's higher education for girls). It became the first educational institution in the country outside Stockholm where girls could matriculate.

Åberg never married. She was awarded the Illis Quorum for her outstanding contribution to Swedish society. Tekla Åberg died on 17 November 1922, of a heart attack and is buried at Norra begravningsplatsen in Stockholm.

== Bibliography ==
- Lövkvist, Linda (2018). Svenskt kvinnobiografiskt lexikon, (In Swedish). University of Gothenburg. ISBN 978-91-639-7594-3.
- Grosjean, Alexia. Svenskt kvinnobiografiskt lexikon [Biographical Dictionary of Swedish Women], (In English). University of Gothenburg. ISBN 978-91-639-7594-3.
