= List of Swedish suffragists and suffragettes =

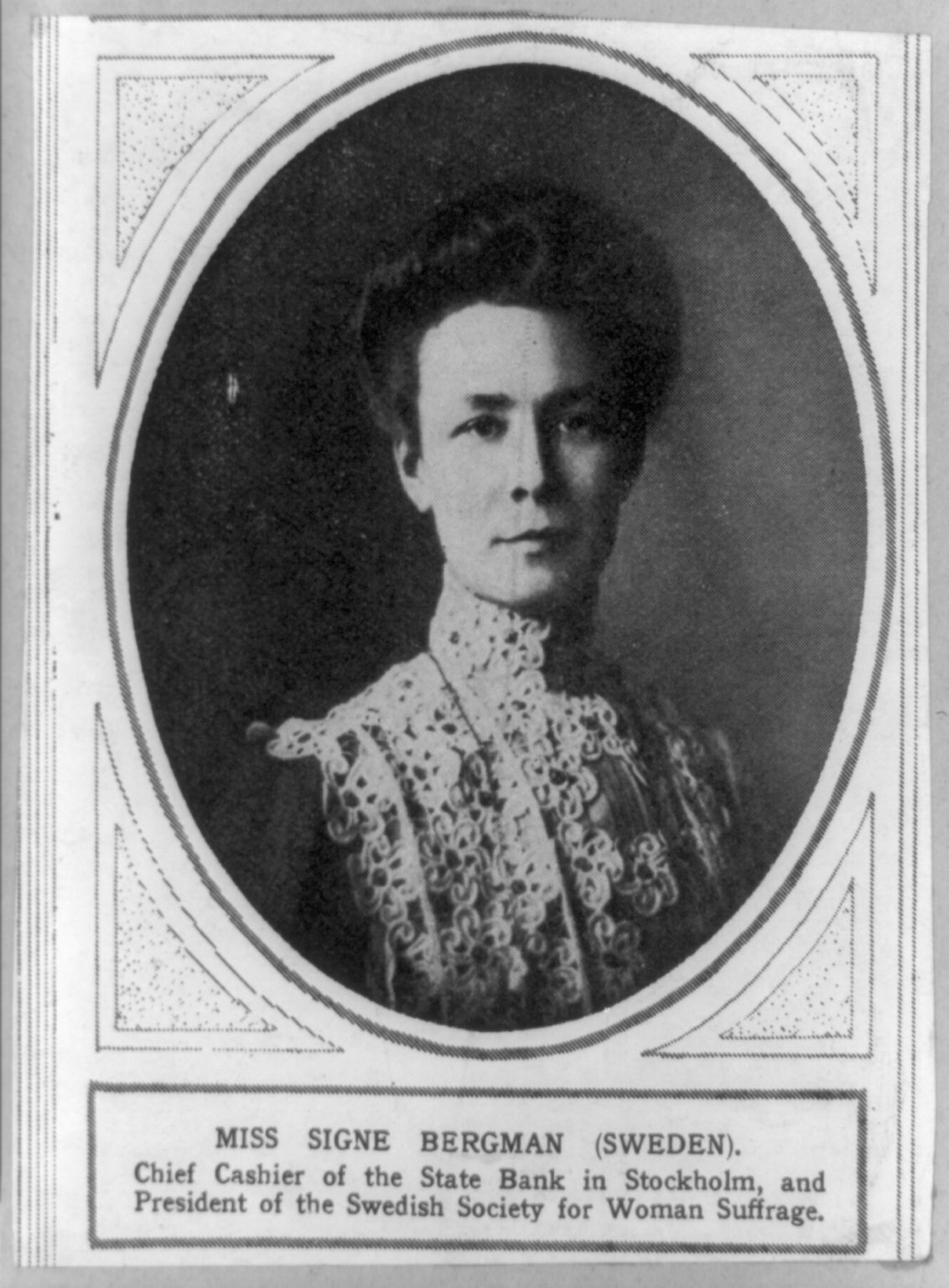
Signe Bergman

This is a list of Swedish suffragists and suffragettes who were born in the Sweden or whose lives and works are closely associated with that country.

== Suffragists and suffragettes ==
- Gertrud Adelborg (1853–1942) – Secretary and leading member of the suffrage movement, presented the first demand of woman suffrage to the government
- Elsa Alkman (1878–1975) – suffragist, women's rights activist, writer and composer
- Eva Andén (1886–1970) – lawyer and suffragist
- Carolina Benedicks-Bruce (1856–1935) – sculptor, women's rights activist and suffragist
- Signe Bergman (1869–1960) – co-founder and Chairperson of the National Association for Women's Suffrage
- Nina Benner-Anderson (1865–1947) – nurse, pacifist and suffragist
- Ella Billing (1869–1921) – women's rights activist and suffragist
- Maria Bolin (1847–1919) – Market gardener and activist for women's rights, peace, and animal welfare
- Hilma Borelius (1869–1932) – literary historian, academic and suffragist
- Kristina Borg (1844–1928) – newspaper publisher, suffragist and peace activist
- Fredrika Bremer (1801–1865) – prominent novelist and early women's rights activist
- Emilia Broomé (1866–1925) – first woman in the legislative assembly, introduced the new laws of equal access to all government posts for both genders
- Märta Bucht (1882–1962) – suffragist and peace activist from Luleå
- Frigga Carlberg (1851–1925) – Chairperson of the National Association for Women's Suffrage (Gothenburg branch)
- Maria Cederschiöld (1856–1935) – journalist, women's rights activist and suffragist
- Alfhild Cnattingius (1847–1932) – suffragist and writer in Nora
- Lizinka Dyrssen (1866–1952) – women's rights activist and suffragist
- Ebba von Eckermann (1866–1960) – women's rights activist and suffragist
- Lisa Ekedahl (1895–1980) – lawyer and suffragist
- Elin Engström (1860–1956) – politician, trade unionist and suffragist
- Hanna Ferlin (1870–1947) – photographer and suffragist
- Karin Fjällbäck-Holmgren (1881–1963) – politician, social welfare activist and suffragist
- Mia Green (1870–1949) – photographer, human rights activist and suffragist
- Sofia Gumaelius (1840–1915) – Treasurer of the National Association for Women's Suffrage
- Ellen Hagen (1873–1967) – suffragist, women's rights activist and politician
- Gerda Hellberg (1870–1937) – women's rights activist and suffragist
- Lilly Hellström (1866–1930) – schoolteacher, children's newspaper editor and suffragist
- Anna Hierta-Retzius (1841–1924) – women's rights activist, suffragist and philanthropist
- Lina Hjort (1881–1959) – suffragist in Kiruna
- Ann-Margret Holmgren (1850–1940) – co-founder and leading campaigner and recruiter for the National Association for Women's Suffrage
- Amanda Horney (1857–1953) – politician, women's rights activist and suffragist
- Ebba Hultkvist (1876–1955) – schoolteacher, suffragist and politician
- Emma Isakson (1880–1952) – newspaper publisher and suffragist
- Ellen Key (1849–1926) – suffragist, ideologist
- Julia Kinberg (1874–1945) – physician and cofounder of feminist organization Frisinnade Kvinnor
- Edit Kindvall (1866–1951) – teacher, photographer, suffragist and women's rights activist
- Anna Kleman (1862–1940) – Swedish suffragist and peace activist
- Sigrid Kruse (1867–1950) – schoolteacher, children's writer and active suffragist
- Klara Lindh (1877–1914) – suffragist, writer, editor
- Anna Lindhagen (1870–1941) – politician, women's rights activist and suffragist
- Cecilia Milow (1856–1946) – writer, educator and suffragist
- Bertha Nordenson (1857–1928) – women's rights activist and suffragist
- Astrid Nyberg (1877–1928) – pioneering newspaper editor and suffragist
- Valborg Olander (1861–1943) – Chairperson of the National Association for Women's Suffrage (local branch)
- Agda Östlund (1870–1942) – politician and suffragist
- Betty Olsson (1871–1950) – suffragist, women's rights and peace activist
- Ebba Palmstierna (1877–1966) – noblewoman and suffragist
- Gulli Petrini (1867–1941) – writer, suffragist, women's rights activist and politician
- Anna Pettersson (1861–1929) – lawyer and suffragist
- Aurore Pihl (1850–1938) – headmistress, women's rights activist and suffragist
- Gerda Planting-Gyllenbåga (1878–1950) – suffragist and social welfare expert
- Emilie Rathou (1862–1948) – journalist, editor, early suffragist
- Anna-Clara Romanus-Alfvén (1874–1947) – physician, suffragist, women's rights activist and educator
- Hilda Sachs (1857–1935) – journalist, writer, women's rights activist
- Ellen Sandelin (1862–1907) – physician and lecturer
- Olga Segerberg (1868–1951) – photographer and suffragist
- Alexandra Skoglund (1862–1938) – suffragist, women's rights activist and politician
- Karolina Själander (1841–1925) – headmistress, women's rights activist, suffragist and politician
- Augusta Tonning (1857–1932) – teacher, suffragist and pacifist
- Elin Wägner (1882–1949) – campaigner for the National Association for Women's Suffrage
- Lydia Wahlström (1869–1954) – co-founder and Chairperson of the National Association for Women's Suffrage
- Jenny Wallerstedt (1870–1963) – teacher, suffragist and local politician
- Adèle Wetterlind (1854–1938) – teacher and suffragist
- Anna Whitlock (1852–1930) – co-founder and Chairperson of the National Association for Women's Suffrage
- Karolina Widerström (1856–1949) – Chairperson of the National Association for Women's Suffrage

== See also ==
- List of suffragists and suffragettes
- Timeline of women's suffrage
