= Signe Salén =

Swedish doctor (1871–1963)

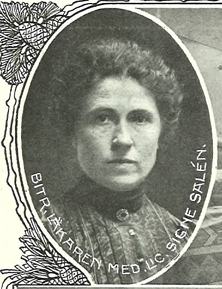
- Signe Salen in 1910
- Born: Sigrid Alfhild Maria af Klintberg; 23 November 1871; Stockholm, Sweden
- Died: 3 August 1963 (aged 91); Stockholm, Sweden
- Burial place: Norra begravningsplatsen
- Education: Uppsala University, Karolinska Institute
- Occupation: Physician
- Spouse: Ernst Salén (m. 1902; died 1908)
- Children: 2

Sigrid Alfhild Maria "Signe" Salén (née af Klintberg; 23 November 1871 – 3 August 1963) was a Swedish doctor who was one of Sweden's first female physicians. She was known for specialising in treating venereal diseases as well as campaigning for the rights of female doctors.

== Early life and education ==
Sigrid Alfhild Maria af Klintberg was born into an aristocratic family on 23 November 1871 in Stockholm and was the fifth daughter of accountant Ludvig Ferdinand af Klintberg and Gertrud Bergman. Her father was later appointed superintendent of a state pension fund in 1905.

After graduating from high school in 1890, she travelled to Germany to study medicine. After that, she studied at Uppsala University where she completed her first medical examination in 1892. She then attended the Karolinska Institute, where she befriended other female medical students, including Gerda Kjellberg, Ada Nilsson, Alma Sundquist, Anna-Clara Romanus-Alfvén and Ellen Sandelin and discussed controversial issues facing women at the time, including contraceptives and prostitution. Salén earned her Bachelor of Medicine Degree in 1896 and her Licentiate Degree in 1901 at the institute. Also in 1901, she was one of 31 female medical students and doctors who signed a petition to the King requesting permission to undertake public appointments.

== Career ==
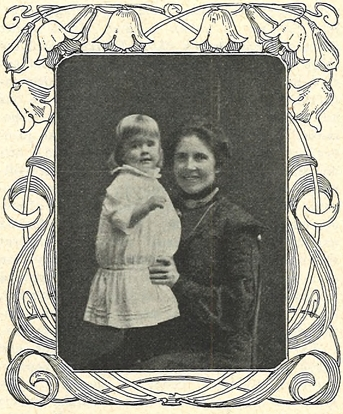
Signe Salén with her son in 1906

Following her graduation, she worked as a teaching assistant at the Allmänna Barnhuset orphanage and at a children's policlinic. She then married the physician Ernst Salén in 1902. They had two sons together, Ernst Ferdinand and Sven. After her husband was employed as a physician at a newly built hospital in Luleå in 1905, she began a medical practice there. She also occasionally assisted her husband during surgeries. Whilst there, she was also appointed as a physician at Luleå's Föreningen Mjölkdroppen, which provided milk to infants that could not be fed by breast milk. In 1906, she was appointed by the Norrbotten Tuberculosis Committee as a deputy member of the Hälsan Institute.

In April 1908, her husband, Ernst Salén, died of meningitis. Two years later, she and her children moved to Söderby sanatorium, where she was employed as an assistant physician caring for patients with tuberculosis. Furthermore, during the 1910s, she worked as a teaching assistant at various institutes, including the Allmänna barnbördshuset birth clinic and Roslagstull Hospital. She also worked as a teaching assistant and as an assistant doctor at Saint Göran Hospital between 1916 and 1918, where she focused on treating tuberculosis and sexually transmitted diseases, the latter of which she later specialised in and was employed as an physician at Sweden's policlinic for genital diseases in women.

== Later life and death ==
After turning 67 in 1939, she retired from the policlinic. Seven years later, in 1946, she requested a pension from the hospital, arguing that she had earned "a certain fee without the right to holidays, sick leave, overtime or a pension" and that she had frequently worked overtime without breaks. Despite claiming that her savings were insufficient to support herself and noting that fellow doctor, Gerda Kjellberg had received a pension, Salén's application was denied. The reason stated for the denial was that Salén treated fewer than 18,000 patients per year (ie nearly 50 patients per day), which was viewed as a typical workload.

Salén died on 3 August 1963 in Stockholm, at the age of 91. She was buried at the Norra begravningsplatsen in Solna.
