= Bucht =

Bucht is a Swedish surname. Notable people with the surname include:

- Gunnar Bucht (born 1927), Swedish composer and musicologist
- Märta Bucht (1882–1962), Swedish schoolteacher, suffragist and peace activist
- Sven-Erik Bucht (born 1954), Swedish politician of the Social Democrats
