= Ebba Hultqvist (suffragist) =

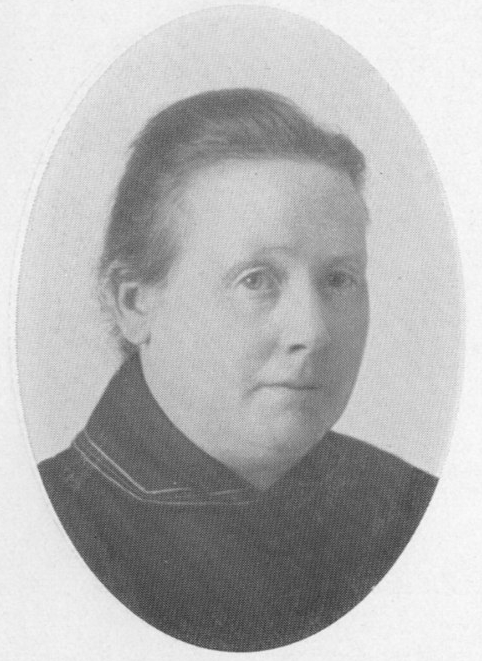
Ebba Hultqvist

Ebba Karolina Regina Hultqvist (1876–1955) was a Swedish teacher, suffragist and early female politician. From 1908, she served as a schoolteacher in Sölvesborg for over 30 years. Active in the suffrage movement, she headed the local women's association of the Liberal Party and was the first woman to be elected to the Sölvesborg Town Council. Hultqvist donated money to support music, education and childcare in the town.

== Biography ==
Born in Stockholm on 10 November 1876, was the daughter of Gustav Vilhelm Hultqvist and Karolina Teresia née Engvall. As both her parents died before she was five years old, she was brought up by foster parents who were crofters in Torhamn, Blekinge: Anders Svensson and Josefina née Jonasdotter. After bringing her up in a good home, they helped her train as a schoolteacher. She obtained her junior school diploma in 1896 and her qualification as a public school teacher ten years later.

In 1908, she was appointed to a full-time teaching post at Möllebacksskolan (Mölleback School) in Sölvesborg where she served for the next 30 years. She became a teacher representative on the school council, a board member of the local lecturing society and headed the town's sickness benefit association. Representing the Liberal Party, in 1913 she became the first woman to be elected to the town council and continued her support for the liberals for the rest of the life.

A keen proponent of votes for women, Hultqvist headed the local branch of the National Association for Women's Suffrage (Sweden). On its establishment in 1912, she also chaired the Bleckinge County branch of the LKPR together with Sigrid Kruse from Karlskrona and Augusta Tonning from Ronneby. Hultqvist assisted those in financial difficulties by donating what she could to support Sölvesborg's local activities in areas such as music, education, Christmas celebrations and travel.

Ebba Hultqvist died on 17 December 1955.
