= Gerda Planting-Gyllenbåga =

Swedish suffragist and social welfare expert (1878–1950)

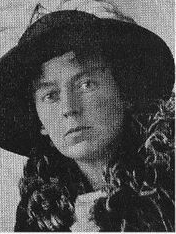
Gerda Planting-Gyllenbåga

Gerda Henrietta Margareta Planting-Gyllenbåga (1878 – 1950) was a Swedish suffragist and social welfare expert who was deeply engaged in the women's movement at the local and national levels as a member of the Swedish Association for Women's Suffrage (LKPR). She devoted considerable attention to public education, organizing courses to promote women's enlightenment. In 1911, in collaboration with LKPR, she coordinated the nationwide educational courses funded by Martina Bergman-Österberg. After spending several years in her native Skara, in 1916, she moved to Stockholm as director of CSA (Centralförbundet för Socialt Arbete), the Swedish social welfare association.

== Biography ==
Born in the village of Istrum in the western Swedish municipality of Skara, Gerda Henrietta Margareta Planting-Gyllenbåga was the daughter of the army officer Claes Gustaf August Planting-Gyllenbåga (1834–1912) and his wife Louise Vilhelmina née Freundt (1834–1886). The youngest of the family's seven children, she was brought up in a well-to-do upper-class environment where she benefited from a good school education.

After graduating in Stockholm, she moved back to Skaraborg County, settling in Rogberga near Huskvarna where she worked for the director responsible for the welfare of the local factory workers. From 1916, she was the director of the welfare association CSA. A driving force in the suffragist movement, Planting-Gyllenbåga established a local branch of the LKPR in Rogberga. A board member of the national association, she was elected to LKPR's executive committee. In 1917, she was among those nominated to chair the organization following the resignation of Signe Bergman. She participated as an LKPR delegate in several of the congresses organized by the International Women Suffrage Alliance.

At the local level, Planting-Gyllenbåga was successful in developing the Rogberga suffrage society into a highly effective branch which was able to open its own premises in 1913. Key speakers included national suffrage figures such as Augusta Tonning, Lydia Wahlström, Frigga Carlberg, Gulli Petrini and Kerstin Hesselgren. Roberga organized LKPR's third general suffrage meeting in June 1915 in Huskvarna.

On the education front, from 1911 Planting-Gyllenbåga was active in coordinating the nationwide courses funded by Martina Bergman-Österberg to help LKPR increase social enlightenment among Swedish women, thus encouraging their efforts to fight for the right to vote. From 1912, she was the first to serve as a lecturer in connection with the courses. In 1915, she moved back to Stockholm to serve as director of the CSA. She remained there until 1918 when she married the art historian Andreas Adolf Fredrik Lindblom (1889–1977). They had no children.

On 17 May 1950, Gerda Planting-Gyllenbåga died in Stockholm, aged 71, and was buried in Tyresö Cemetery.
