= Astrid Nyberg =

Swedish newspaper editor and suffragist

Astrid Birgitta Nyberg
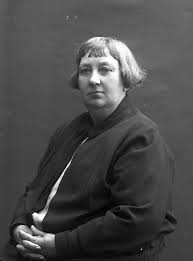
- Astrid Nyberg (1927)
- Born: 5 January 1877; Gothenburg, Sweden
- Died: 9 September 1928 (aged 51); Varberg, Sweden
- Occupation(s): Newspaper editor, suffragist

Astrid Birgitta Nyberg (5 January 1877 – 9 September 1928) was a pioneering Swedish newspaper editor and suffragist. From 1903, as editor of Norra Hallands Tidning Vestkusten in Varberg, she campaigned to encourage support for women's suffrage. A board member of the local branch of the Association for Women's Suffrage (LKPR), she constantly kept her readers informed of developments discussed at the association's meetings.

== Biography ==
Born on 5 January 1877 in Gothenburg, Astrid Birgitta Nyberg was the daughter of the journalist Johan Peter Nyberg (1829–1911) and his wife Johanna Charlotta née Ullgren (1835–1918). She was the youngest of the family's three children. On completing her education in a private school, she worked for a time as a nurse.

In 1903, Nyberg took the position of editor-in-chief at the newspaper Norra Hallands Tidning Vestkusten, replacing her father who had held the position since 1878 but now wanted to retire. During her leadership, the newspaper grew significantly engaging additional staff. She also ran a printing house for books.

Like her newspaper, Nyberg was basically conservative, passionately interested in the freedom of the press. She was a member of the local temperance society, briefly holding the position of chair. A strong supporter of the suffrage movement, she not only expressed her views in her paper but spoke at meetings asserting that both married and unmarried women should enjoy the same voting rights as men. Frigga Carlberg of the LKPR commented that "she looks and speaks like the wildest suffragette".

Astrid Nyberg died in Varberg on 9 September 1928.
