= Maria Bolin =

Swedish activist, horticulturalist, author, and musician (1847–1919)

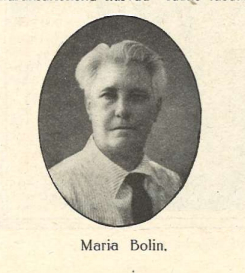
- Bolin (1917)
- Born: Maria Elisabet Åkerblom; 8 May 1847; Falun, Kopparberg County, Sweden
- Died: 28 March 1919 (aged 71); Rönninge, Salem, Stockholm County, Sweden
- Occupations: Horticulturalist, social reformer, utility company founder
- Movement: Women's suffrage, dress reform, health; peace; animal welfare
- Spouse: Edvard Ludvig Bolin (1841–1885)
- Parent(s): Johan Frans Åkerblom and Maria Catharina Norström

Maria Bolin (born Maria Elisabet Åkerblom; 8 May 1847 – 28 March 1919) was a Swedish social and political activist, horticulturalist, and folk musician whose public life spanned women's suffrage, dress reform, career education, peace advocacy, and animal welfare. Widowed in 1885, she took up farming at Rönninge, Stockholm County, in 1897 and became a prominent local organizer. From 1890 she served on two committees of the Fredrika Bremer Association, campaigning against restrictive women's clothing and for women's access to horticultural education. She was the first signatory of the 1905 petition to the government calling for women's suffrage on equal terms with men, chaired the Rönninge–Tumba branch of the national suffrage association, and during the First World War served on the national central board of the Swedish Peace and Arbitration Society.

== Early life ==
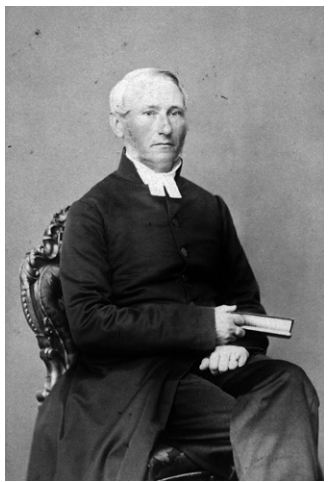
Johan Frans Åkerblom

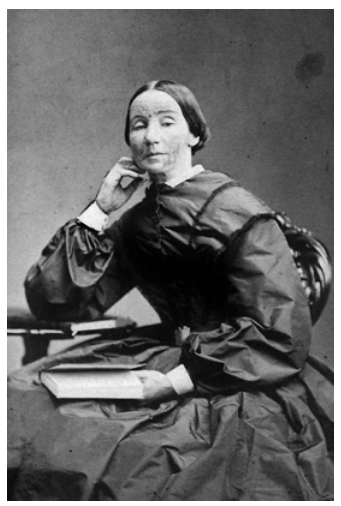
Maria Catharina Norström

Maria Bolin's parents

Maria Elisabet Åkerblom was born on 8 May 1847 in Falun, Kopparberg County, to Johan Frans Åkerblom (1806–1886), a clergyman and educator, and Maria Catharina Norström (1815–1874), and was baptized on 18 May. (Note: Hedberg and Arosenius (1914) give her date of birth as 9 May 1847; the parish birth register records 8 May.)

The family moved twice during her childhood as her father took up appointments as rector of parishes in Västmanland and Dalarna, where he later also served as the county's first state school inspector. He is remembered for encouraging the early literary development of Erik Axel Karlfeldt, later a Nobel laureate. Bolin later referred to Dalarna as her home district (min hemtrakt Dalarne).

Her siblings included Carolina (1836–1881), a professional singing teacher; Henrik (1841–1903), a teacher, school inspector, and rector of the Falun teachers' school; Knut Alrik (1849–1924), an engineer and chemist; and Helena Emilia (1856–1935), author of a family memoir. Three other siblings died in infancy. Her brother Fredrik Åkerblom (1839–1901) earned a doctorate at Uppsala and became a newspaperman, editing Göteborgs-Posten from 1873 to 1896 and founding Morgon-Posten in Gothenburg in 1896; he also sat in the Second Chamber of the Riksdag from 1894 to 1896.

== Marriage and children ==
Maria Åkerblom married Edvard Ludvig Bolin (1841–1885) in 1869; he served first as county notary (länsnotarie) and later as county secretary (landssekreterare) of Kopparberg County. Besides raising a large family, she managed the farm that belonged to the couple's home, and their home was known for its hospitality and music. They had four children, all born in Falun. Elisabeth (1870–1877) died in childhood. Karin Katarina (1873–1926) married Carl Boyesen, (Note: Full name Carl Fredrik Vilhelm de Meza Boyesen (1865–1912).) of the Norwegian Ministry of Defence, in 1898 and moved to Norway. After he died in 1912, she returned to Sweden and married the bank official Carl Fredrik Fleetwood in 1913. Clas (1875–1912) worked as an engineer and mining school instructor. Henrik (1880–1947) served as a lieutenant in the Göta livgarde before leaving the military in 1907 to become a singer and actor.

Edvard Bolin died on 18 November 1885 in Stockholm, after several years of illness, at the age of 44. After his death she kept the family property in the Lallarfvet district of Falun for several years, selling a plot from it as the site of a planned home for indigent women and part of its farmland to the merchant Otto Karlsson, who laid it out as a housing estate for workers. She then lived in Stockholm with her surviving children. In 1897 she began farming at Sandbäck in Rönninge, Salem parish, while keeping a home in Stockholm into the 1900s; by 1910 she was living on her farm in Salem parish, where she remained for the rest of her life

In 1913 she compiled and published Familjen Bolins krönika (The Bolin Family Chronicle), a detailed genealogical record of the Bolin family tracing the line from an eighteenth-century officer of the Swedish East India Company through six generations and across several countries, including branches in Falun, Stockholm, Gothenburg, Moscow, and Malaga. (Note: The book has since been digitized by the National Library of Sweden and is freely available online at weburn.kb.se.)

== Campaign against school drinking ==
In May 1884 the newspaper Tidning för Falu Län och Stad published an anonymous article questioning the drinking culture at the Falun secondary school (Falu högre allmänna läroverk): punch served to pupils at a school society dance, rowdy behaviour on Walpurgis Eve, and wine brought into the matriculation examinations, reportedly with the rector's knowledge. When the rector, Carl Jonas Dahlbäck, published a reply in August, the paper reprinted the article and observed that he had in effect conceded its main points.

The school's teaching staff then formally accused Bolin of being the author and demanded that she retract the charges or substantiate them before the school's governing board. Bolin sent their demand to the newspaper for publication, stating that she could not be held legally responsible for what it had printed. The paper backed her, noting that under the Freedom of the Press Ordinance only its editor answered for its contents, and that the presumed author was under no obligation to submit to what it called an "inquisition" by the school. It also pointed out that the staff's chairman, Dahlbäck, was himself the Justice Minister's press-freedom ombudsman in Falun.

== Dalarna Animal Protection Society ==
In 1884, Bolin co-founded the Dalarnes djurskyddsförening (Dalarna Animal Protection Society). At a preparatory meeting convened by the county governor in June 1884 and attended by about twenty people, it was agreed that the society should cover the whole county and be open to both men and women; Bolin was elected deputy member of the committee charged with drafting its bylaws. The bylaws emphasized humane treatment of animals, public education, and the reporting of cruelty to authorities. They established a governing board of eight members and four deputies and gave everyone, regardless of gender, an equal right to join and serve on the board.

The society was formally constituted at a meeting in Falun on 16 December 1884, which set the annual membership fee at 50 öre. Both Maria and her husband Edvard were elected deputies on its first board, on which women held four of the eight seats. By 1919 it was made made part of Dalarnas hembygdsförbund, an umbrella body for Dalarna’s local and provincial associations. It later became the Dalarna district of the national Svenska Djurskyddsföreningen (the Swedish Animal Protection Society).

== The Fredrika Bremer Association ==
The Fredrika Bremer-förbundet (FBF, Fredrika Bremer Association), founded on 3 December 1884 by Sophie Adlersparre and named after the Swedish novelist and women's rights advocate Fredrika Bremer, was Sweden's largest women's organization of the era. With over 2,500 members by 1907, it worked on education, professional training, social reform, and women’s suffrage. Bolin was active in two of its specialist committees, the Dräktreformföreningen (Dress Reform Association) and the Trädgårdskommittén (Garden Committee), from 1890 onwards.

=== Dress Reform Association ===
The FBF's Dress Reform Association had been founded independently in March 1885 before merging into the FBF in May 1890 as a self-governing section. It campaigned against the tightly laced corset (snörlivet), excessively long skirts, and restrictive outer garments, and promoted healthier alternatives, including reform underclothing, divided skirts, children's clothing, a maternity dress, and a school dress for girls. The movement argued that women's clothing was a barrier to physical freedom, employment, and independence.

Bolin joined the association's board (styrelsen) from at least 1892 and served as its treasurer (kassaförvaltare) from at least 1896; in 1898 she was elected a deputy board member. On 20 April 1894 she delivered the lecture "Den moderna kvinnodräkten — ett hinder för självständighet" (The Modern Woman's Dress: a Hindrance to Independence) at a meeting of the association held at the FBF's offices alongside a display of its model garments, to great acclaim. It was published in Idun in two installments, on 27 April and 4 May 1894. In it she attacked the corset, including corsets made for girls from the age of two, as well as the restrictive dolma cape, trailing skirts that carried street dirt into the home, and the lack of pockets in women's dresses. "It is impossible to develop towards independence," she argued, "if one wears a hard-laced bodice every day." She ended by wishing women the strength "to defy the tyranny of fashion".

At the 1897 General Art and Industrial Exhibition in Stockholm the association was awarded a silver medal for its "very good hygienic underclothing". In 1897–98 it designed a chemise, a bust support intended to replace the corset, and a dress for school-age girls. A German dress reform society in Berlin requested patterns of FBF's new designs. Bolin, who had trained at a sloyd school, had registered as an exhibitor in her own right and showed a cabinet she had both carved and built to her own design, and a carved chair in the Dragon style. A reviewer singled out her work as an example of women's skill in fine joinery, a traditionally male field.

In January 1897, Bolin spoke at a large public meeting in Stockholm on the length of women's skirts, co-organized by the association and several prominent female physicians, including Karolina Widerström. The meeting drew a capacity crowd. Speakers argued that long skirts trailing on the ground were a public health hazard, collecting dirt and spreading disease into the home. Bolin went further, claiming that long skirts prevented young women's legs from developing their natural strength and stride. Widerström called on mothers not to wait for fashion to change, but to take the matter into their own hands.

The same concerns about women's health and bodily autonomy also informed her 1913 membership in the Svenska föreningen för moderskydd och sexualreform (SFMS, Swedish Association for Maternal Protection and Sexual Reform), founded by Frida Stéenhoff to campaign for the legal rights of unmarried mothers and their children, equal sexual morality applying to men and women alike, and sex education in schools.

=== Garden Committee ===
Bolin was one of the three founding members of the FBF's Garden Committee, appointed in autumn 1890 together with Ellen Ankarsvärd and Dr. Carl Nyström to work for women's access to horticultural education and employment. She remained active in its work through at least 1900.

The committee's first initiative was to arrange for women to be admitted to a gardening school run by horticulturalist Rudolf Abelin at Norrvikens trädgårdar (Note: This school was at Björnsnäs estate, Qvillinge parish, near Norrköping in Östergötland, and is documented in contemporary sources from the late 1880s and early 1890s. Abelin later created the better-known Norrviken Gardens near Båstad (1906–1920), after the Östergötland school had closed.) in Östergötland. Bolin later described how the committee, "after considerable deliberation back and forth," succeeded in persuading Abelin to accept female students at his newly established school. The FBF granted 150 kronor to fund the first two students, Ellen Belfrage and Isa Damm; the course started course began the spring of 1891. Abelin was satisfied with the women's enthusiasm and energy, but the school's finances eventually failed and he was unable to continue accepting female students. The committee then spent several years trying to find placements for women at other estates.

On 25 November 1898 Bolin introduced a discussion on "Trädgårdsskötsel såsom yrke för kvinnor" (Gardening as a Profession for Women) at a gathering of the FBF. She reviewed the committee's eight years of work and argued that the lack of suitable lodging on private estates made a dedicated gardening school for women highly desirable. In an article published in Idun (1899, no. 30) she rebutted several objections that had been raised against women entering the horticultural profession. To those who argued that women would take men's jobs, she gave a sharp reply:

You men are generally quite helpless without us — if you have spent centuries practicing the gardening trade in such a way that it has nearly starved many who made it their livelihood, then it is truly time that we came to your assistance.

Speakers at the 1898 gathering pointed to the greater opportunities available to women in horticulture abroad, noting that institutions such as Swanley Horticultural College in England and the Women's London Gardening Association provided professional employment for large numbers of women, and that similar schools existed in Germany and Finland.

In 1900 she published a further article, "Trädgårdsskolor för kvinnor" (Gardening Schools for Women), in the FBF's journal Dagny, surveying the women's gardening schools that had recently been established and calling for schools to offer full professional qualifications equivalent to those available to men.

=== Women's house project ===
In early 1914 Anna Whitlock raised the idea of a cooperative, non-denominational women's house in Stockholm at a meeting attended by the LKPR central board, and Bolin then convened a committee to take it forward. That July the FBF launched a separate appeal for a women's cooperative club in Stockholm, modeled on "Årsta", the Swedish women's exhibition at the Baltic Exhibition in Malmö, with exhibition space, a library, meeting rooms and a restaurant. The two initiatives agreed to cooperate, and Bolin sat on the jury of an Idun essay competition on how the club should be run. The appeal was withdrawn weeks later on the outbreak of the First World War.

== Women's political suffrage ==
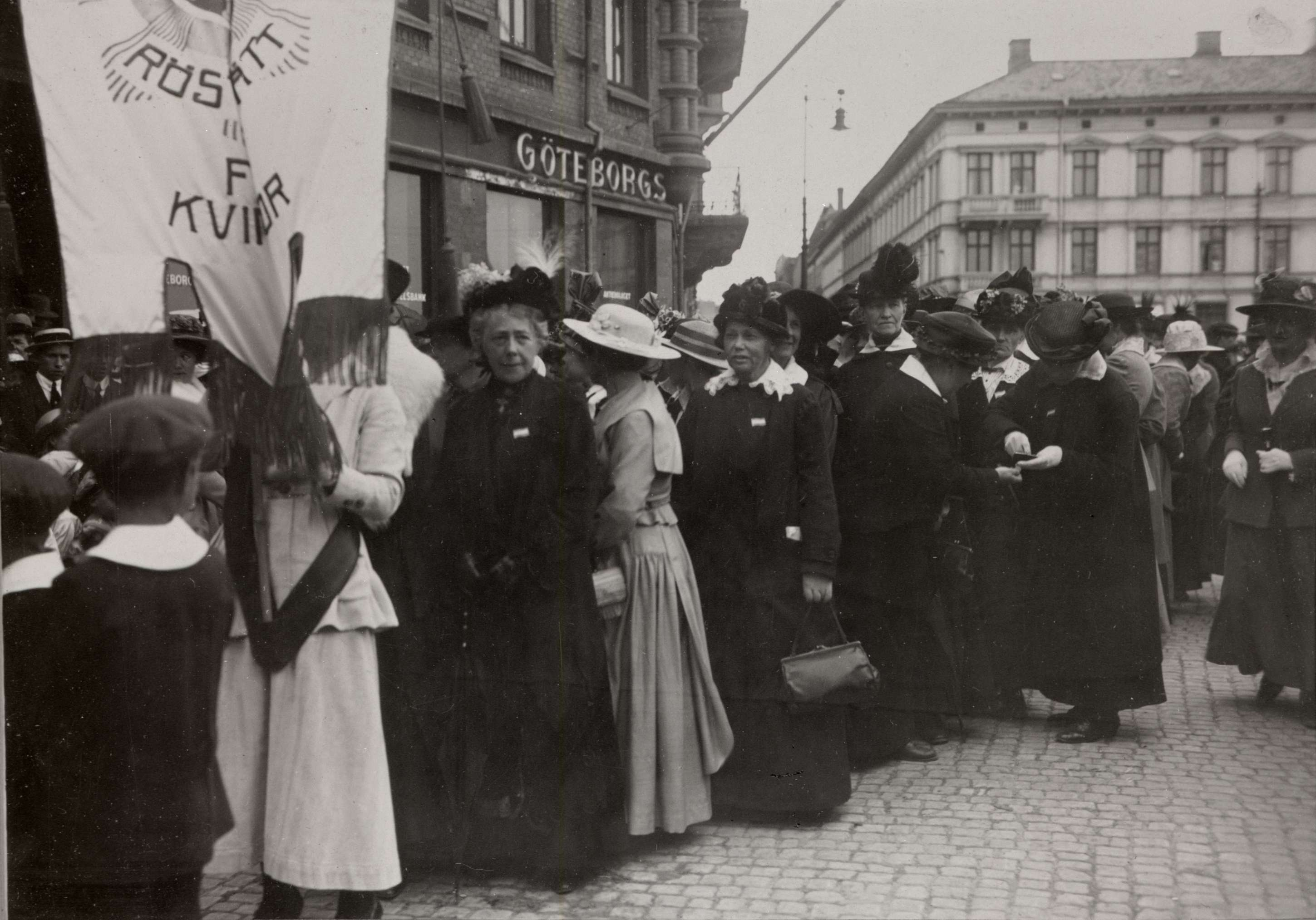
FKPR suffrage protest, Gothenburg, Sweden, 1918

In Sweden, women who owned property or paid sufficient taxes had been entitled to vote in municipal elections since 1862, but they had no vote in national parliamentary elections and could not stand for parliament.

To pursue national suffrage, the Swedish women's suffrage movement developed a three-tier organizational structure. At the local level, women formed branches of the Föreningen för kvinnans politiska rösträtt (FKPR). These were grouped into county federations (länsförbund), which in turn were linked to the national Landsföreningen för kvinnans politiska rösträtt (LKPR). By the end of 1916 the LKPR had 215 local associations with 14,416 members, organized in sixteen county federations. (Note: The first Föreningen för kvinnans politiska rösträtt was founded in Stockholm on 4 June 1902. As further local associations formed, their delegates organized the national LKPR in spring 1903; local associations then voted on whether to join, and the Stockholm association considered membership, with the right to appoint three members to the national central board, in October 1903. Local branches continued to operate under the FKPR name.)

=== Early national involvement ===
==== 1905 petition ====
Bolin was the first signatory of the 1905 petition calling for women's suffrage on equal terms with men.

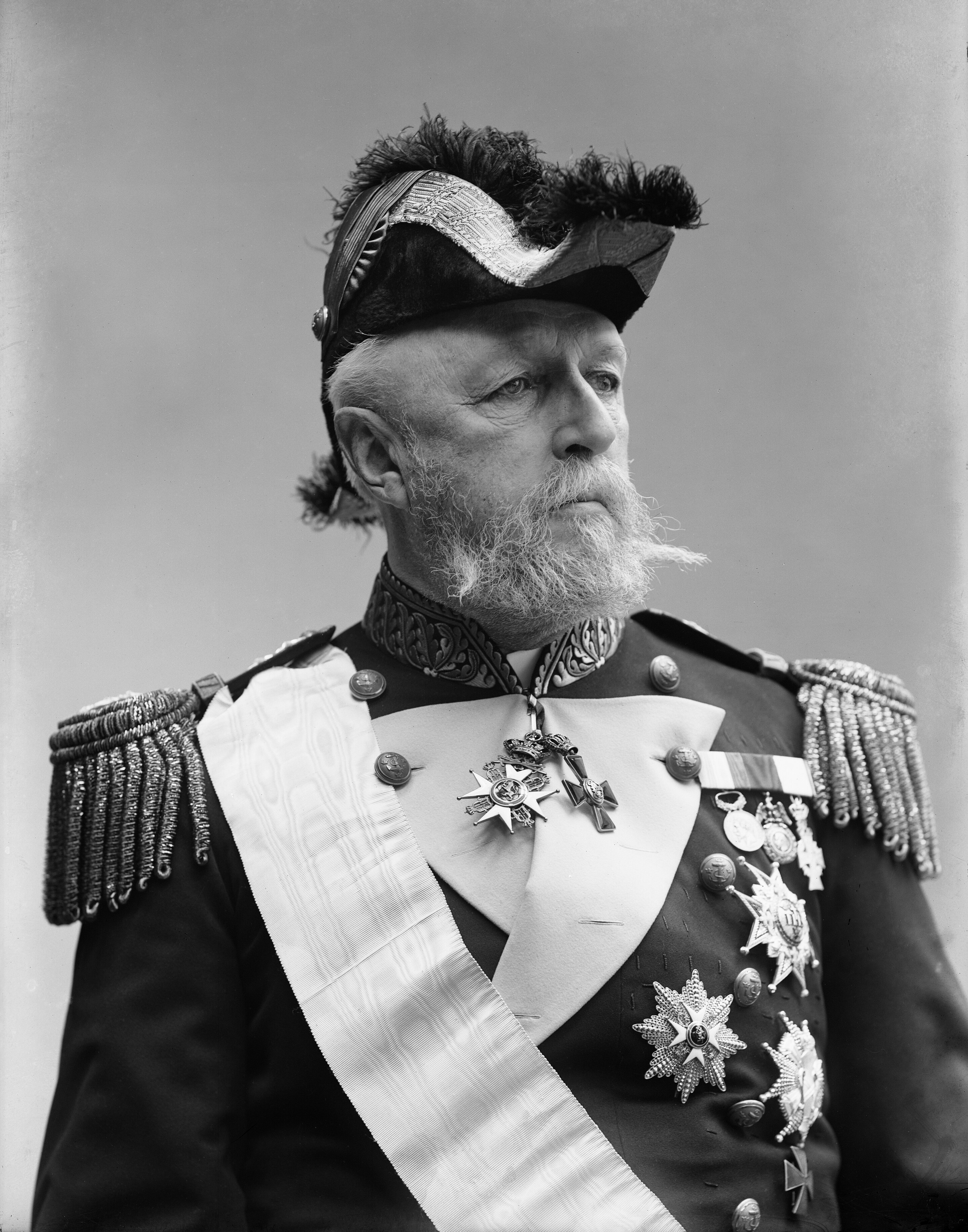
King Oscar II of Sweden

On 23 November 1905 she and the other women who would sign the petition convened a large public meeting on women's political suffrage at the Peoples House in Stockholm. Each of the conveners was listed by occupation, Bolin as trädgårdsodlare (market gardener). The opening lecture, "Hvarför skola kvinnorna vänta?" ("Why Should Women Wait?"), was delivered by Frida Stéenhoff, and the meeting drew more than 700 attendees.

The meeting adopted a resolution addressed to King Oscar II, urging the government and political parties to act:

The meeting considers the time now ripe for Sweden's women to demand political suffrage simultaneously with the forthcoming extension of the franchise for men, and on equal terms with men.

On 4 December 1905, Bolin and Anna Pettersson formally delivered the petition to the Ministry of Justice (justitiedepartementet). Their names appeared first on the list of signatories, identified by occupation rather than marital title: Bolin as trädgårdsodlare (market gardener) and Pettersson as kappsömmerska (coat seamstress). Twelve additional women added their signatures, all likewise identified by profession. (Note: The twelve additional signatories were: Ellen Dahlbäck, gymnastics director; Hilda Sachs, writer; Agda Östlund; Ruth Pettersson, coat seamstress; Anna Eriksson, primary school teacher; Anna Clara Romanus, medical candidate; Elin Jansson, shop assistant; Anna Johansson, insurance inspector; Alma Sundqvist, practising doctor; Gertrud Kuno, rosette seamstress; Valborg Ulrich, life insurance inspector; and Anna Lindhagen, child welfare inspector.)

The petition argued that women's suffrage already enjoyed substantial support in both chambers of the Riksdag, and that excluding women from any forthcoming reform would grant citizenship rights to only half the population. It further warned that Sweden risked falling behind Russia and Finland, where broader enfranchisement was advancing. The petition also rejected the idea that a husband's legal guardianship (målsmanskap) over his wife should bar married women from voting, calling for the abolition of male guardianship alongside suffrage reform.

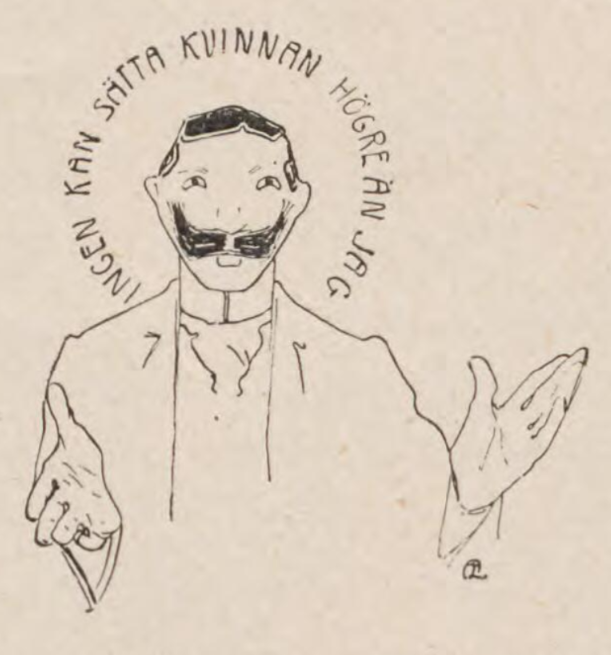
"No one can place woman higher than I" — Gurli Linder's satirical feature in Svenska Dagbladet, December 1905.

In its 1905 Christmas issue, Svenska Dagbladet published a two-page satirical pro-suffrage feature by Gurli Linder, "Mannen som — samhällsförbättrare?" (Man as social reformer?), which proposed an all-female government with Ellen Key as prime minister and listed "Mrs Maria Bolin, former market gardener" as Jordbruksminister (Minister of Agriculture).

==== 1906 headquarters and mass petition ====
In January 1906 Bolin provided the first premises of the Women's Suffrage Office (Rösträttsbyrån), the LKPR's operations headquarters. When the office opened on 26 January 1906 at Kommendörsgatan 3 in Stockholm, the rooms had been "kindly given to the association … by Mrs. Maria Bolin," according to contemporary notes preserved in the Stockholm City Archives. During its brief period at the Bolin address, the office was the hub for the 1906 mass petition: coordinating volunteers, dispatching petition lists nationwide, receiving completed lists, processing signatures, registering new members, and handling contributions.

=== Local involvement ===
Bolin was a longstanding member of the Stockholm FKPR, the movement's founding branch. On 4 June 1912 she was among about sixty members who gathered at Lidingöbro värdshus to mark its tenth anniversary; at the supper, chaired by Anna Lindhagen with Lydia Wahlström as main speaker, Bolin gave the speech in honor of the association's board.

In January 1915 the branch held a public meeting at Rönninge school in support of a local veto on alcohol sales. After a lecture on temperance legislation by Claes Löfgren of Södertälje, Bolin spoke on women's right to take part in legislative work, especially on temperance, and the meeting unanimously adopted the resolution of the temperance movement's joint central committee. The branch's Birgittadagen (St. Bridget's Day) rallies under her chairmanship drew large audiences at Mimer's Hall: about 150 attendees in 1916, when Anna Ljungberg gave the main address on St. Birgitta, and over a hundred in 1917, when the economist Knut Wicksell delivered the main address on the need for women's suffrage. In 1916 the branch also organized civic-education courses in both Rönninge and Tumba, and its members held seats on the local municipal council, health board, pension board, and child welfare board. At the branch's semi-annual meeting on 5 May 1917 in Rönninge, three days before her seventieth birthday, she spoke on women's citizenship.

During the First World War, Bolin also coordinated fundraising through the local branch for the Hjälpkommittén för krigsfångar (Prisoner-of-War Relief Committee), operating under the patronage of Crown Princess Margareta.

=== County involvement ===
At the county level, Bolin was elected to the working committee (arbetsutskott) of the Stockholm County LKPR federation at its annual meetings in 1911 and 1913, and by 1917 was serving as its secretary. She lectured at branch meetings across the county: at Södertälje in October 1911 alongside Anna Lindhagen, at Sigtuna on consecutive days in May 1913, and at Västerhaninge in December 1913 alongside Hilda Sachs, arguing that women's suffrage was a means to broader social reform rather than an end in itself.

=== Later national roles ===
Bolin was elected branch delegate in 1912 to the LKPR's national central board (centralstyrelsen), and represented the Rönninge-Tumba branch there in 1916 and 1917. She served as a minutes attester (protokollsjusterare) at the central board's tenth meeting in January 1913, and was elected an alternate delegate to the International Woman Suffrage Alliance congress in Budapest that June; she held the same role alongside Anna Wicksell at the eleventh meeting in 1914. At the fifteenth central board meeting, in January 1919, she was again a minutes attester, alongside Ada Molin, and at its close thanked the executive committee on behalf of the provincial delegates. It was one of her last public acts.

== Swedish Peace and Arbitration Society ==
Bolin was an active member of the Svenska freds- och skiljedomsföreningen (SFSF, Swedish Peace and Arbitration Society). She often argued for peace and women's suffrage from the same platform.

She frequently appeared alongside Carl Sundblad, elementary school teacher, peace lecturer, and long-serving officer of the society, who like her lived in Rönninge. At a midsummer peace meeting in Rönninge in June 1911 she delivered an acclaimed lecture on women's political rights alongside Sundblad; in April 1915 she opened a peace evening organized by her suffrage branch at Rönninge school, at which Sundblad spoke on women's part in the peace cause; both served on the society's central board, and both lectured at its 1917 course for peace speakers.

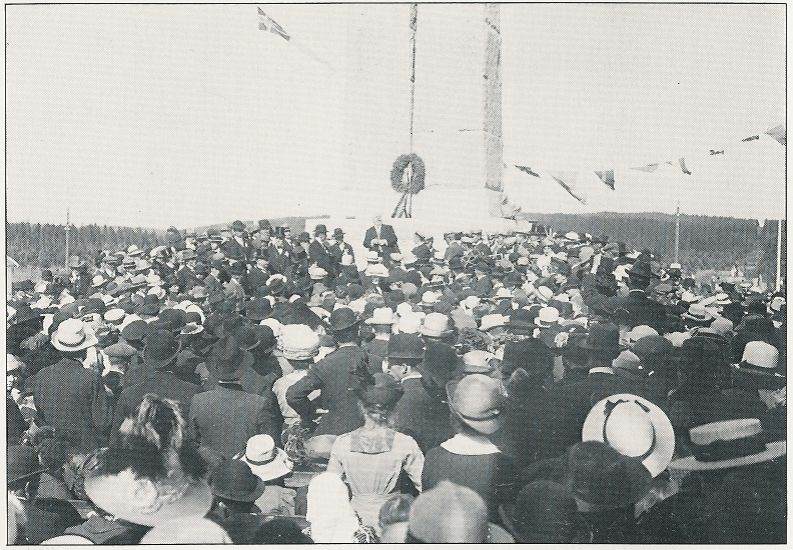
Dedication of the peace monument on the Norway-Sweden border, 16 August 1914

At the SFSF's annual meeting at Charlottenberg in August 1914, weeks after the outbreak of the First World War and the day before the inauguration of the peace monument on the Swedish-Norwegian border, Bolin was re-elected to the central board and spoke at an outdoor evening peace gathering alongside member of parliament Nils Andersson Berg and other board members. At the meeting they voted unanimously to telegraph Prime Minister Hammarskjöld in support of Sweden's neutrality policy and the wish that Denmark would join the agreement. Carl Sundblad was among the featured speakers at the monument's dedication the following day.

At the General Swedish Peace Congress (Allmänna svenska fredskongressen), held over three days in Varberg in June 1915, Bolin objected when male speakers opened their addresses with Mina herrar! ("Gentlemen!") rather than Mina damer och herrar! ("Ladies and gentlemen!"), asking pointedly: Ha vi inte några damer i kongressen? ("Don't we have any ladies in the congress?") She went on to describe how women could assert themselves in peace, temperance, and other associations, and urged the Nordic peoples to use the autumn 1915 peace congress in Copenhagen to decide on collective action. The intervention was applauded. At the open-air women's peace meeting on Påskberget that closed the congress, held in heavy rain, she spoke on women's suffrage as a just reward for the peace work Swedish women were doing, ending with a fourfold cheer for the cause. The conservative Göteborgs Aftonblad, which derided the gathering as "a socialist affair", described her speech as a howled harangue and declared her "worse than Sylvia Pankhurst herself". In July 1915 she co-signed the central board's national appeal urging men and women to join the society, organize peace work county by county, and bring religious, temperance, women's and youth organizations into collective membership.

As a central board member in 1916 she co-signed the society's major public documents of that year: a March "call to awakening" urging clergy to preach for peace; the April invitation to a general Scandinavian peace congress in Stockholm in June; and an autumn appeal for a Scandinavian Peace Week from Christmas 1916 to Epiphany 1917 in support of compulsory international arbitration and a world peace federation. At the society's annual meeting, held on the eve of the congress, she was re-elected to the central board, which was enlarged to twenty members to include representatives of the religious, women's, temperance and labour movements; membership had tripled during the year to about 10,000.

In January 1917 she was among the Swedish, Norwegian and Danish signatories, including Carl Lindhagen, Anna Lindhagen, Elin Wägner and Matilda Widegren, of a public statement launching a series of Scandinavian opinion meetings. The statement argued that the oppression of national minorities was a principal cause of the war and that a just and lasting peace required the nationality question to be settled in the peace treaty.

The society's 33rd annual meeting was held at Norrlands nation in Uppsala in June 1917, by which time membership had grown to roughly 21,000; Bolin served as one of the meeting's two secretaries. At the welcome reception for the General Swedish Peace Congress held that evening in the nation's great hall, she spoke of childhood memories of the popular enthusiasm for student military training (studentbeväringen), arguing that combating the romantic allure of war required more than congresses and associations: it demanded genuine faith in the attainability of peace. The rest of her address drew on a 1912 lecture by Ellen Key.

In October 1917 she was one of six lecturers, alongside Matilda Widegren, Carl Sundblad, Knut Wicksell, Edvard Wavrinsky and Carl Lindhagen, at a ten-day course run by the society to train some fifteen new peace speakers.

== Rönninge municipal council ==
From 1900 to 1910 Bolin chaired the Rönninge community association (samhällsförening) and helped secure a meeting hall for the community. On 15 August 1915, Bolin was elected one of seven founding members of the newly established Rönninge municipalnämnd (municipal council), the only woman among them. While she was listed in Svenska Dagbladet simply as Fru Maria Bolin, without any professional designation, the six men were each identified by their occupations or education: a university graduate, a gardener, an engineer, a farmer, a lay assessor (nämndeman), and a factory owner (fabrikör). To stagger future elections, Bolin, the lay assessor Leonard Andersson and the factory owner E. Enbergh were elected for two years and the other four members for four. Among the deputy members was Anna Lindblom, a midwife and Red Cross nurse. Bolin was re-elected to the council in 1917. A contemporary tribute described her as lively and forceful in municipal affairs, but always attentive to reasoned argument and respected accordingly.

In April 1915 she was elected a deputy member of the interim board to establish a folk high school for southern Stockholm County, the only woman among its ten elected members. When the association was formally constituted in June, she was elected one of its deputy auditors.

== Business ventures: farming and electricity ==
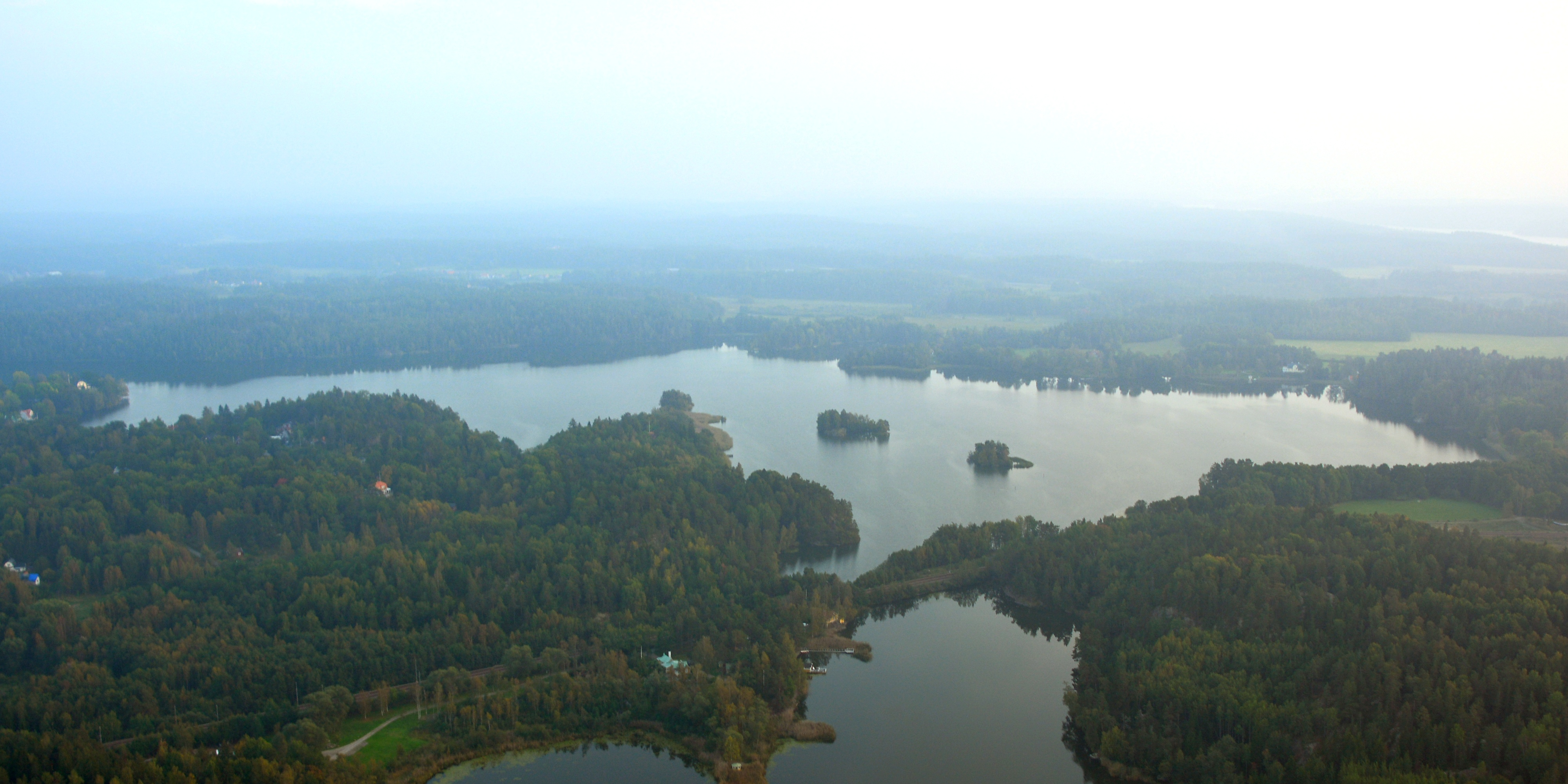
Lake Uttran

In 1897 Bolin began farming at Sandbäck, a historic farm in Rönninge, Salem parish, named after the brook Sandbäcken that runs through it into Lake Uttran. She ran the farm herself, "like a full-grown man" in the words of one contemporary profile; it included a small orangery, and she later built a separate house, Höganloft, on the estate for her son Henrik and his family. She was also a member of the Stockholms läns Hushållningssällskap (Stockholm County Agricultural Society).

On 11 June 1914, Bolin co-signed in Tumba the founding document (stiftelseurkund) of a joint-stock company seated in Grödinge parish, Stockholm County, with share capital of 60,000–180,000 kronor, formed to sell power from a central power station for electric lighting and motor power. She was the only woman among the six founders, alongside J. W. Engwall, Knut Lundström, Richard Isberg, August Andersson, and Alfred Hedlund. On 10 June 1917, Rönninge Elektriska Aktiebolag was constituted at a meeting in the neighbouring community of Rönninge, with Bolin elected deputy auditor; wartime shortages of materials delayed the construction of its power lines. These ventures were part of the early wave of small local distribution companies that drove Swedish rural electrification: between 1915 and 1920 the proportion of arable land belonging to farms with electricity rose from 5 to nearly 40 percent, and by 1938 about 65 percent of rural households had been electrified.

== Music ==
Music was central to several generations of Bolin's family. Her father played the violin and served as song teacher at the boys' school in Falun; her sister Carolina became a professional singing teacher; and her son Henrik left the military to train as a singer under Eugen Robert Weiss in Wiesbaden, later performing operetta, cabaret, and Bellman songs alongside his second wife Ellen Maria Hansen. Between 1903 and 1909 Maria Bolin served on the board of the Stockholm Music Society.

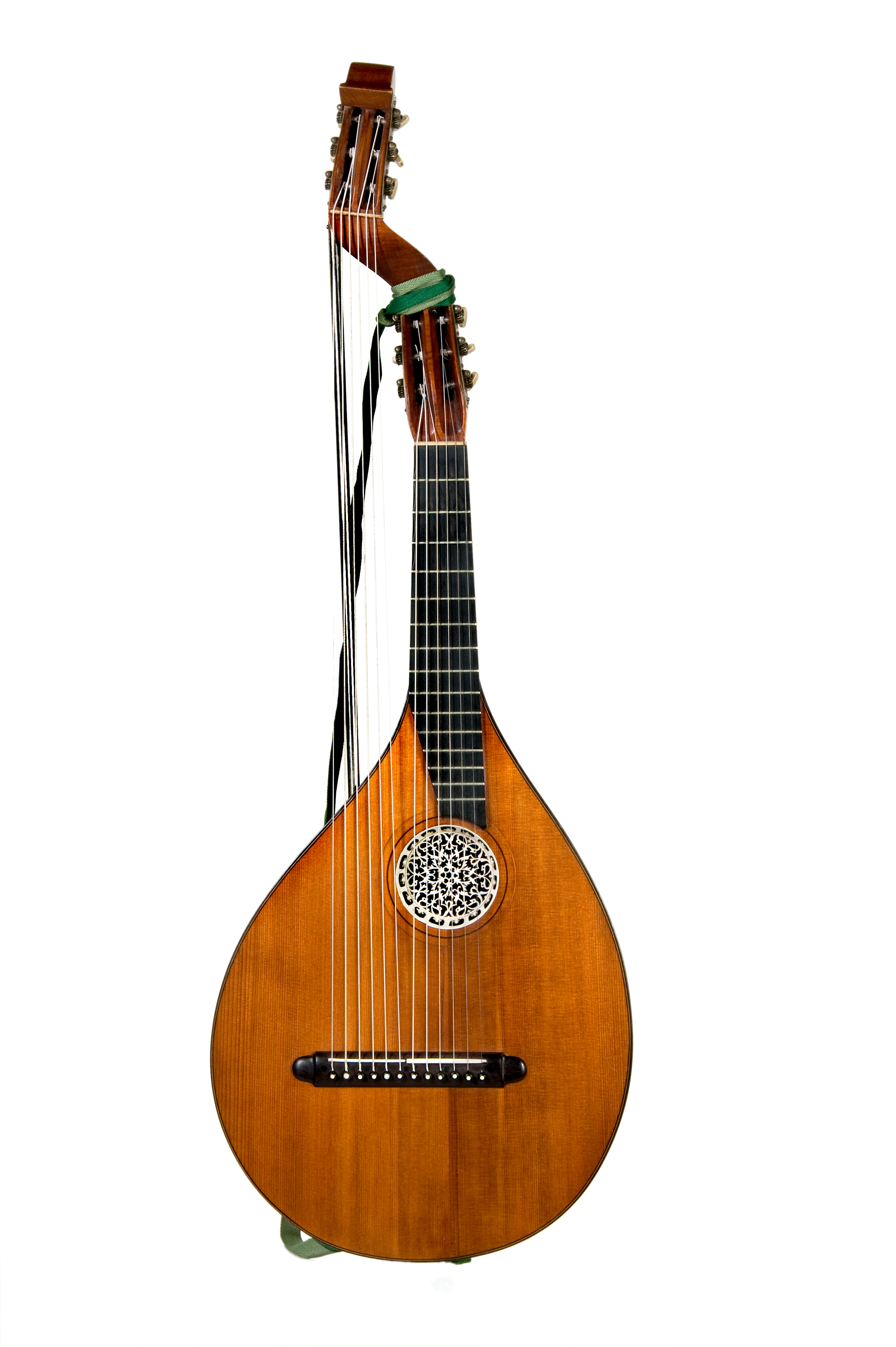
Swedish Lute

Bolin herself was a folk musician who sang to the Swedish lute. Her principal musical venue was Sällskapet Nya Idun (the New Idun Society), a Stockholm society for women in the arts and professions, where she performed regularly. In January 1898 she closed the society's annual gathering with lute songs, performing with her daughter Karin. She appeared again at its autumn meeting in October 1905, and by 1910 Svenska Dagbladet named her as one of the society's leading musical contributors. She led the society's Idun Quartet, where her deep alto and droll renditions of Bellman's "Joakim uti Babylon" were long remembered. A 1925 history of the society listed her among its leading musicians, alongside the composers Laura Netzel, Helena Munktell and Ika Peyron. In Rönninge she also conducted the community choir.

She also performed at civic and political events. In August 1905 she lectured at a Rönninge youth festival on the origins of Nordic folk song, dressed in traditional peasant costume; in November 1906 she sang Runeberg's "Bön för fosterlandet" (Prayer for the Fatherland) at the Rönninge school inauguration; and in January 1907 she presented "Litet småprat om våra folkvisor" (A Little Chat about Our Folk Songs) at a Stockholm public gathering, performing on a variety of instruments, and sang to the lute at a soirée at Folkets Hus that featured a lecture by Frida Stéenhoff on "the concept of the fatherland". She sang to the lute at suffrage meetings, including the Stockholm County federation's annual meeting in Norrtälje in September 1913, and at the dinner held in the festival hall of the Royal Dramatic Theatre in April 1915 to honour Anna Lindhagen on her retirement as chair of the Stockholm FKPR. On one occasion she performed alongside her son Henrik.

== Death and legacy ==
In 1917 Idun marked her seventieth birthday with a portrait and a short profile, describing her as a respected force within the FKPR whose influence in Rönninge had been politically and socially significant. A tribute written by Maria Dehn and published in Rösträtt för kvinnor the same year described her as follows:

Plainly dressed, one might say, with a straightforward and unpretentious manner, striking for the robustness of her figure, her fine profile, and her short-cropped white hair. (Note: Original Swedish: Puritanskt klädd, skulle man kunna säga, med enkelt framträdande utan förkonstling, intresserande dels genom det kärnfriska i gestalten med den vackra profilen och det vita kortklippta håret.)

The tribute went on to describe how she traveled from place to place by trilla, a light, open, single-horse carriage:

...sometimes in sun, sometimes in rain and sleet — with a pile of pamphlets in the box of her one-horse carriage — to arouse interest in her cherished causes: justice for women, peace, temperance. (Note: Original Swedish: …ömsom i sol ömsom i regn och rusk, för att — med en massa skrifter i baklådan å enspännaren — å olika orter söka väcka intresse för sina älsklingsidéer: rättvisa åt kvinnorna, fred, nykterhet.)

Bolin died on 28 March 1919 at her home in Rönninge at the age of 71, weeks before the Swedish parliament cast its first vote in favor of women's suffrage on 2 May 1919. She was survived by two of her four children, Henrik and Karin, and two siblings, Knut and Helena Emilia. In her obituary in Rösträtt för kvinnor, Ann Margret Holmgren lamented that "a steadfast and faithful suffrage fighter" had died without seeing the victory she had worked for, and remembered her as a devoted farmer who lectured chiefly on suffrage and peace.

Her will requested a simple send-off:

My funeral shall take place simply, without flowers, eulogy, or other ostentation. My mortal remains shall, after autopsy, be cremated — a witnessed instruction to this effect is among my papers, and the cost of cremation has been paid in advance. My ashes shall be placed in the family grave in Falun. (Note: Original Swedish: Min jordafärd skall ske enkelt, utan blommor, liktal eller annat prål. Min kroppshydda skall, efter företagen obduktion, brännas, därom bevittnad bestämmelse finnes bland mina papper; förbränningskostnaden är på förhand betald. Min aska sättes i familjegraven i Falun. The grave (plot no. 0117) is recorded in the Rötter gravestone registry as Familjen Bolin, a sandgrav (sand grave) at Stora Kopparbergs kyrkogård dating from the 1900s, with no surviving burial register.)

Bolin held positions in the Swedish women's suffrage movement at local, regional, and national levels, serving as chair of the Rönninge-Tumba FKPR, secretary of the Stockholm County LKPR federation, and provincial spokeswoman at national LKPR central board meetings. She was the first signatory of the 1905 petition to the government calling for women's suffrage. In the peace movement she served on the national central board of the Swedish Peace and Arbitration Society from 1914 to 1916 and as a secretary of its 1917 annual meeting. She was a founding member of the Dalarna Animal Protection Society in 1884, the Fredrika Bremer Association's Garden Committee in 1890, and the Rönninge municipal council in 1915, the only woman among its seven founding members. In 1914 she was the only woman among the six founders of an early rural electrification company.

== See also ==
- List of peace activists
- List of Swedish suffragists and suffragettes

== Bibliography ==
- "Fredrika-Bremer-förbundets dräktreformförening". Aftonbladet (in Swedish). 29 March 1898. p. 4.
- Ansnes, Kari (2015). "Länge leve "fröken Friman" – och fru Maria Bolin!". Salem – historia (in Swedish).
- Ansnes, Kari (4 January 2017). "Maria Bolin trotsar modets tyranni". Salem – historia (in Swedish). Archived from the original on 26 May 2026.
- Bolin, Maria (27 April – 4 May 1894). "Den moderna kvinnodräkten — ett hinder för självständighet". Idun (in Swedish). 7 (17–18): 131, 139–140.
- Bolin, Maria (1899). "Trädgårdsskötsel såsom yrke för kvinnor". Idun (in Swedish) (30).
- Bolin, Maria (1900). "Trädgårdsskolor för kvinnor". Dagny (in Swedish) (6): 130–133.
- Bolin, Maria (1913). Familjen Bolins krönika (in Swedish). Södertälje: Södertälje Tidnings Tryckeri.
- "Dödsfall: Edvard Ludvig Bolin". Dagens Nyheter. 19 November 1885. Kammakaregatan 8, Jakob och Johannes parish, Stockholm.
- "Fredsmöte i Rönninge". Dagens Nyheter. 26 June 1911.
- "Kvinnorösträttsmötet i Södertälje". Dagens Nyheter. 24 October 1911.
- "Stiftelseurkund". Dagens Nyheter (in Swedish). 13 June 1914. p. 2.
- "Nya bolag". Dagens Nyheter. 15 June 1914.
- "Folkhögskola i Stockholms läns södra: En förening bildad för att realisera tanken". Dagens Nyheter (in Swedish). 27 April 1915. p. 4.
- "Folkhögskola för södra Stockholms län: Den första gåvan: 10,000 kr. till byggnadsfonden". Dagens Nyheter (in Swedish). 15 June 1915. p. 7.
- "Skandinaviska fredskongressen öppnad: Svenska freds- och skiljedomsföreningens årsmöte". Dagens Nyheter (in Swedish). 11 June 1916. p. 5.
- "Rönninge elektriska bolag bildat". Dagens Nyheter (in Swedish). 11 June 1917. p. 8.
- "Opinionsmöten i nationalitetsfrågan: Nationalitetsproblemet måste lösas vid fredsslutet". Dagens Nyheter (in Swedish). 30 January 1917. p. 5.
- "Fredskongressen i Uppsala: En välkomstfest i Norrlands nations stora sal". Dagens Nyheter (in Swedish). 23 June 1917. p. 8.
- "Rönninge municipalstämma". Dagens Nyheter. 31 December 1917.
- "Maria Bolin, f. Åkerblom". Dagens Nyheter. 30 March 1919.
- "Sällskapet Nya Idun". Dagens Nyheter (in Swedish). 18 January 1925. Part 2, p. 3.
- "Fredrika-Bremer-Förbundets årsberättelse för år 1890". Dagny (in Swedish) (5): 8–9. 1891.
- "Fredrika-Bremer-Förbundets årsberättelse för år 1892". Dagny (in Swedish) (4). Bil. IV, pp. 16–19. 1893.
- "L. K. P. R:s centralstyrelsemöte i Stockholm den 9 och 10 januari". Dagny (in Swedish). 6 (3): 18–19. 16 January 1913.
- "Styrelsens i Dräktreformföreningen årsberättelse för år 1894". Dagny (in Swedish) (4–8). 1895.
- "Fredrika-Bremer-Förbundets årsberättelse för år 1896". Dagny (in Swedish) (4). 1897.
- "Fredrika-Bremer-Förbundets årsberättelse för år 1897". Dagny (in Swedish) (10). 1898.
- "Föreningsmeddelanden: Fredrika-Bremer-Förbundets Samkvämskomité". Dagny. Ny följd (in Swedish). 1 (19): 501. 1898.
- Elgenstierna, Gustaf (1926). Den introducerade svenska adelns ättartavlor (in Swedish). Vol. 2. Stockholm. p. 728, Friherrliga ätten Fleetwood nr 49, Tab. 43.
- Erlandsson, Elis (1922). Skara högre allm. läroverks lärjungar 1870–1910 (in Swedish). p. 237.
- "Ett kuriöst fredsmöte i Varberg: Kvinnornas fredsmöte — en socialistisk tillställning". Göteborgs Aftonblad (in Swedish). 28 June 1915. p. 9.
- "Fredsmötet vid svensk-norska gränsen". Göteborgs-Posten (in Swedish). 17 August 1914.
- "Fredskongressen i Stockholm: Även utomskandinaviska deltagare". Göteborgs-Posten (in Swedish). 13 June 1916. p. 5.
- "L.K.P.R. – Det tionde centralstyrelsemötet". Göteborgs Handels- och Sjöfartstidning (in Swedish). No. 7. 10 January 1913. p. 4.
- Hasselgren, Andreas (1897). Utställningen i Stockholm 1897: Beskrifning i ord och bild öfver Allmänna konst- & industriutställningen (in Swedish). Stockholm. p. 659.
- Hedberg, Walborg; Arosenius, Louise (1914). Svenska kvinnor från skilda verksamhetsområden: Biografisk uppslagsbok (in Swedish). Stockholm: Albert Bonniers förlag. p. 15.
- "Fredrika-Bremer-Förbundets 34:de årsmöte den 23–24 april 1919". Hertha (in Swedish). 6 (5): 74–80. May 1919.
- Hofverberg, Elin (4 June 2021). "100 Years of Women's Suffrage in Sweden". In Custodia Legis. Library of Congress.
- Holmgren, Ann Margret (15 April 1919). "Maria Bolin †". Rösträtt för kvinnor (in Swedish). 8 (8): 3.
- "Ur notisboken: Dräktreformföreningen". Idun (in Swedish). 7 (17): 134. 27 April 1894.
- "Idun utlyser täfling!". Idun (in Swedish). 27 (27): 3. 5 July 1914.
- E. W. (5 July 1914). "Samling kring "Årsta-klubben"!". Idun (in Swedish). 27 (27): 1–2.
- "Kvinnoporträtt till dagskrönikan". Idun (in Swedish). 30 (21): 335. 20 May 1917.
- Jansson Myhr, Karin (17 November 2020). "How electricity conquered the countryside". The history and heritage of Vattenfall. Vattenfall / The Centre for Business History.
- "Qvinliga trädgårdsodlare". Jordbrukarens Tidning (in Swedish). 3 December 1898.
- LKPR (1906). Skrifter utgivna av Centralstyrelsen i Landsföreningen för kvinnans politiska rösträtt, I: Till regeringen från svenska kvinnor ingifna skrifvelser i rösträttsfrågan 1905–1906 (in Swedish). Pages 43–48.
- Landsföreningen för kvinnans politiska rösträtt (1917). Årsberättelser för Landsföreningen och Lokalföreningarna för kvinnans politiska rösträtt 1916 (in Swedish). Stockholm: Oskar Eklunds Boktryckeri.
- Lagerlöf Nilsson, Ulrika (2021). "Anna Sofia Wilhelmina Lindblom". Svenskt kvinnobiografiskt lexikon.
- "Kortare kjolar". Nerikes Allehanda (in Swedish). 20 January 1897.
- "Fredrika-Bremer-förbundet". Nordisk familjebok (in Swedish). Vol. 8 (2nd (Uggleupplagan) ed.). 1908. Columns 1309–1310.
- "Anmälda utställare: Nordens Expositionstidning". Nordens Expositionstidning (in Swedish). 15 November 1896.
- Nordgren, Boel (2023). "Trädgårdsmästarinnans otrampade stig: Trädgårdsodlingens roll inom kvinnorörelsen och kvinnors väg in i trädgårdsbranschen 1859–1923" (PDF). Fataburen (in Swedish): 130–148.
- Nordström, Jonas (2024). "Antavla Britt Bolin". subbe.se (in Swedish).
- "Sammankomster: Nya Idun". Nya Dagligt Allehanda (in Swedish). 12 January 1898.
- "Vigde: Karl Boyesen och Karin Bolin". Nya Dagligt Allehanda (in Swedish). 1 November 1898.
- "Åkerblom, Fredrik". Svenska män och kvinnor: biografisk uppslagsbok (in Swedish). Vol. 8. Stockholm: Bonnier. 1955. p. 496.
- "Sammankomster: Nya Idun". Post- och Inrikes Tidningar (in Swedish). 9 October 1905.
- "Falu Kristine kyrkoarkiv, Födelse- och dopböcker, dubblettserie, C II/1 (1841–1855)" (in Swedish). Riksarkivet. 1847. SE/ULA/11441/C II/1, image 48, May 1847, no. 25.
- "Bouppteckning: Bolin, Edvard Ludvig". Riksarkivet. 1885. Falu rådhusrätt (SE/ULA/10239), F 2:54, nr 109.
- "Svenska Djurskyddsföreningen SD. Dalarnas distrikt". Nationell Arkivdatabas (in Swedish). Riksarkivet. Reference code SE/FAW/81.1978; records 1885–1987 (0.9 shelf metres); held at Dalarnas Folkrörelsearkiv.
- "Census 1880". Riksarkivet. Kristine parish, Falun.
- "Census 1900". Riksarkivet. Hedvig Eleonora parish, Stockholm.
- "Census 1910". Riksarkivet. Salem parish.
- Wollter, Signe (15 June 1912). "Stockholms F.K.P.R:s 10-årsfest". Rösträtt för kvinnor (in Swedish). 1 (8): 2.
- "Arbetet ute i landet: Rönninge F.K.P.R". Rösträtt för kvinnor (in Swedish). 1 (19): 4–5. December 1912.
- "Arbetet ute i landet: Sigtuna F.K.P.R". Rösträtt för kvinnor (in Swedish). 2 (10): 4. May 1913.
- "Arbetet ute i landet: Stockholms länsförbund". Rösträtt för kvinnor (in Swedish). 2 (20): 4. 15 October 1913.
- "Arbetet ute i landet: Stockholms länsförbund". Rösträtt för kvinnor (in Swedish). 3 (1): 5. January 1914.
- "L. K. P. R:s 11:te centralstyrelsemöte". Rösträtt för kvinnor (in Swedish). 3 (2): 2. February 1914.
- "Anna Lindhagen hyllas". Rösträtt för kvinnor (in Swedish). 4 (8): 2. 15 April 1915.
- "Arbetet ute i landet: Rönninge-Tumba F.K.P.R". Rösträtt för kvinnor (in Swedish). 4 (11): 5. 1 June 1915.
- "Arbetet ute i landet: Rönninge-Tumba F.K.P.R". Rösträtt för kvinnor (in Swedish). 5 (22): 5. November 1916.
- Dehn, Maria (1917). "Maria Bolin 70 år". Rösträtt för kvinnor (in Swedish). 6 (11): 6.
- "Arbetet ute i landet: Rönninge-Tumba F.K.P.R". Rösträtt för kvinnor (in Swedish). 6 (11): 8. June 1917.
- "Rönninge-Tumba F.K.P.R". Rösträtt för kvinnor (in Swedish). 6 (21). 1917.
- "L. K. P. R:s 15:de centralstyrelsemöte". Rösträtt för kvinnor (in Swedish). 8 (2): 2–3. 15 January 1919.
- "Gravsten #326770: Bolin". Rötter – Gravstensinventeringen. 28 November 2017. Stora Kopparbergs kyrkogård, plot no. 0117.
- "Svenska freds- och skiljedomsföreningens årsmöte". Signalen (in Swedish). 20 August 1914.
- "Svenska Freds- och skiljedomsföreningens årsmöte". Signalen (in Swedish). 15 June 1916.
- "Upprop till freds-, nykterhets-, arbetare-, religiösa, ungdoms- och kvinnoföreningar: Fredsvänner Sverige runt!". Signalen (in Swedish). 26 October 1916. p. 3.
- "Svenska Freds- och Skiljedomsföreningens årsmöte". Signalen (in Swedish). 28 June 1917. p. 2.
- "Till tänkande män och kvinnor i Sveriges land". Fria ord. Skara Tidning (in Swedish). 4 August 1915. p. 1.
- "Upprop till freds-, nykterhets-, arbetare-, religiösa, ungdoms- och kvinnoföreningar". Skara Tidning (in Swedish). No. 89. 4 November 1916. p. 4.
- "Ett väckelserop!". Skara Tidning (in Swedish). 14 June 1916. p. 3.
- "Från utställningen: Slöjdafdelningarna II". Socialdemokraten (in Swedish). 29 May 1897. p. 1.
- "Kvinnan som trädgårdsmästare". Socialdemokraten (in Swedish). 2 December 1898. p. 3.
- "Diskussionsmöte för män och kvinnor angående kvinnans politiska rösträtt". Socialdemokraten (in Swedish). 21 November 1905. p. 1.
- "Litet småprat om våra folkvisor". Socialdemokraten (in Swedish). 23 January 1907.
- "Soaré: Frida Stéenhoff och Maria Bolin". Socialdemokraten (in Swedish). 23 January 1907. p. 3.
- Betänkande med förslag till lag angående kulturminnesvård samt organisation av kulturminnesvården. I: Historik, memorial ang. minnesvårdens nuvarande ståndpunkt, utländsk lagstiftning samt bilagor (Report). Statens offentliga utredningar (in Swedish). Stockholm: Ecklesiastikdepartementet. 1922. pp. 149, 235.
- Stéenhoff, Frida (1912). Äktenskap och Demokrati (in Swedish). Page 17.
- "Förlofning: Karl Boyesen och Karin Bolin". Stockholms Dagblad (in Swedish). 15 June 1897.
- "Skolhusinvigning i Rönninge". Stockholmsbladet (in Swedish). 12 November 1906.
- "Lysning: Henrik Bolin och Mary Olga Klein". Stockholmstidningen (in Swedish). 21 April 1903. p. 2.
- "En återblick på det gångna decenniet: Tre intressanta föredrag på aftonens möte på Strand Hôtel". Stockholmstidningen (in Swedish). 10 January 1913. Part 2, p. 2.
- "Rönninge-Tumba kvinnliga rösträttsförening". Stockholmstidningen (in Swedish). 11 January 1915.
- Stockholmskällan (1907). "Anteckningar om Rösträttsbyråns verksamhet". Stockholmskällan (in Swedish). Stockholm City Archives.
- "Till Sverges kvinnor! Kvinnornas andelsförening Årsta-klubben". Sundsvalls Tidning (in Swedish). 8 July 1914. p. 3.
- "Fredrika-Bremer-förbundets dräktreformförening". Svenska Dagbladet (in Swedish). 24 March 1896. p. 2.
- "Rönninge". Svenska Dagbladet (in Swedish). 5 August 1902.
- "Föreningen för kvinnans politiska rösträtt i Stockholm". Svenska Dagbladet (in Swedish). 15 October 1903. p. 4.
- "L. K. P. R:s centralstyrelsemöte: Öppnades på torsdagen härstädes. Ett segervisst välkomstanförande af fröken Whitlock". Svenska Dagbladet (in Swedish). 10 January 1913. p. 6.
- Linder, Gurli (18 December 1905). "Mannen som — samhällsförbättrare?". Vinterbloss, Svenska Dagbladets julnummer. Svenska Dagbladet (in Swedish). pp. 6–7.
- "Nya Idun". Svenska Dagbladet (in Swedish). 30 January 1910.
- "Nya bolag". Svenska Dagbladet (in Swedish). 14 June 1914. p. 13.
- "Rönninge första municipalnämnd utsedd". Svenska Dagbladet (in Swedish). 16 August 1915. p. 6.
- "Nykterhetsmöte i Rönninge". Svenska Dagbladet (in Swedish). 11 January 1915. p. 7.
- "Lysning: Henrik Bolin och Ellen Maria Hansen". Svenska Dagbladet (in Swedish). 6 December 1915.
- "En fredstalarekurs". Svenska Dagbladet (in Swedish). 9 October 1917. p. 18.
- "Insamling för krigsfångar". Svenska Dagbladet (in Swedish). 19 July 1917.
- "Rönninge samhälles elektrifiering". Svenska Dagbladet (in Swedish). 11 June 1917. p. 8.
- "L.K.P.R:s centralstyrelsemöte". Svenska Dagbladet (in Swedish). 10 January 1919.
- "Maria Bolin †". Svenska Dagbladet (in Swedish). 1 April 1919. p. 7.
- "Svenska medarbetare i Idun år 1894". Svenska Morgonbladet (in Swedish). 22 December 1894.
- "Svenska föreningen för moderskydd och sexualreform — Flygblad n:o 1" (PDF) (in Swedish). 1913.
- "Cabaretafton: Herr och Fru Henrik Bolin". Sydsvenska Dagbladet (in Swedish). 21 March 1916.
- "Ungdomsfest i Rönninge". Södertälje Tidning (in Swedish). 16 August 1905.
- "Djurskyddsfrågan". Tidning för Falu Län och Stad (in Swedish). 11 June 1884. p. 2.
- "Dalarnes djurskyddsförening". Tidning för Falu Län och Stad (in Swedish). 18 December 1884. p. 2.
- "Gömdt är icke glömdt". Tidning för Falu Län och Stad (in Swedish). 10 September 1884. p. 3.
- "Gömdt är icke glömdt". Tidning för Falu Län och Stad (in Swedish). 30 August 1884. p. 2.
- "Dalarnes djurskyddsförening – stadgar". Tidning för Falu Län och Stad (in Swedish). 29 January 1885.
- "Egendomsförsäljning". Tidning för Falu Län och Stad (in Swedish). 26 November 1889. p. 2.
- "Inbjudan till allmän skandinavisk fredskongress". Trollhättans Tidning (in Swedish). 16 May 1916. p. 4.
- "Allmänna svenska fredskongressen". Varbergsposten (in Swedish). 28 June 1915.
- "Idun: föredrag af fru Maria Bolin". Vestmanlands Läns Tidning (in Swedish). 28 April 1894.
- "Storartad trädgårdsanläggning". Vårt Land (in Swedish). 31 October 1888.
- "Kvinnornas rösträttspetition". Vårt Land (in Swedish). 5 December 1905.
- "Kortare kjolar". Västgöta Korrespondenten (in Swedish). 22 January 1897.
- Ärnbäck, Kristoffer (2019). Kulturhistorisk inventering: Stora Kopparbergs kyrkogård (PDF) (Report). Kyrkoantikvarisk rapport 2018:18 (in Swedish). Falun: Dalarnas museum. p. 82, plot no. 0117.
- Östlund, Lars (2013). Prosten Åkerblom – Dalarnas förste länsskoleinspektör (PDF) (in Swedish). Stiftshistoriska sällskapet i Västerås stift.
