= Lina Hjort =

Swedish suffragette (1881–1959)

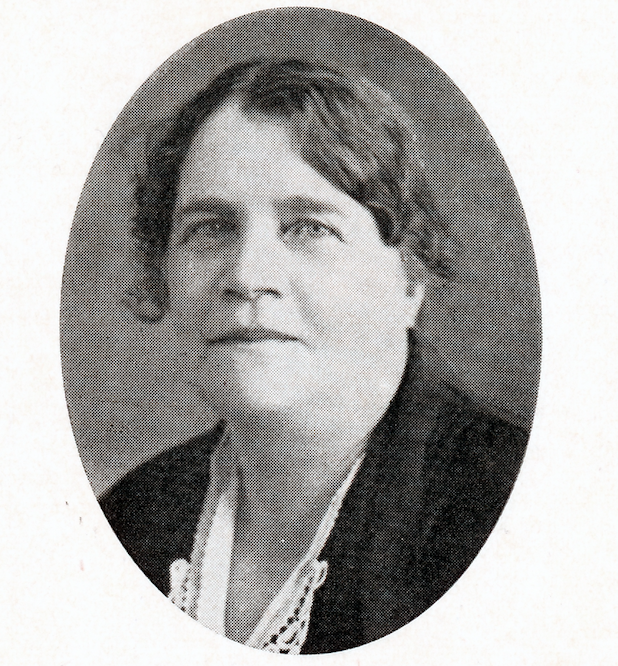
Lina Hjort (1937)

Anna Karolina (Lina) Hjort (1881–1959) was a Swedish schoolteacher, house builder and suffragette. Born into poverty in the far north of Sweden, she fought for her survival by collecting and chopping wood, did well at school and attended a teacher training college. She moved from teaching into building houses in Kiruna, gaining success and prosperity. In 1913, she encouraged women in the surrounding villages to support women's suffrage, arranging meetings for the cause in her home. Her life is recorded in her detailed diaries which are held at the Norrbottens Museum.

== Biography ==
Born in Hietaniemi Parish, Norrbotten, close to the Finnish border in the far north of Sweden, Anna Karolina Hjort was the daughter of unmarried parents: Johan Petter Aronsson and Margareta Johanna Hjort née Sikainen. According to her diaries, she felt unwanted by her parents but developed a close, loving relationship with her grandmother, despite her poverty.

Thanks to her good physical condition, as a child Lina Hjort was able to earn a little money by chopping and collecting wood from the surrounding forest. Performing well at school, she was granted a scholarship which allowed her to attend the teacher training college in Haparanda. On qualifying in 1901, she was assigned to become a schoolmistress in the little village of Kurravaara to the north of Kiruna. She had a difficult time at the school as neither the children nor their parents thought it necessary.

Fed up with Kurravaara, she asked the director of the mining operations in nearby Kiruna if she could work there, hoping to earn more than she could in teaching. Director Lundbohm immediately signed her on and took good care of her, as he did all his employees. He even gave her permission to use discarded bricks and timber so that she could build a house. It was such a success that she went on to build more houses, renting out rooms to schoolmistresses and other women. She became prosperous enough to arrange parties where she played the piano or accordion, thoroughly enjoying her new life.

She soon became a respected figure in the community. The doctor's wife, a Mrs Lind, encouraged her to become engaged in politics, especially in the cause for women's suffrage. Realizing that women should not suffer further injustices, Hjort visited the surrounding farms and villages, encouraging women to sign up in support of voting rights. By 1913, the local suffrage branch of the National Association for Women's Suffrage had 150 active members and Lina Hjort's home had become a venue for suffrage meetings. Hjort herself struck up close relationships with the suffrage leaders of the day, Lydia Wahlström, Gulli Petrini and Frigga Carlberg.

Lina Hjort spent the rest of her life in Kiruna where she died on 12 August 1959.
