= Klara Lindh =

Swedish suffragist (1877–1914)

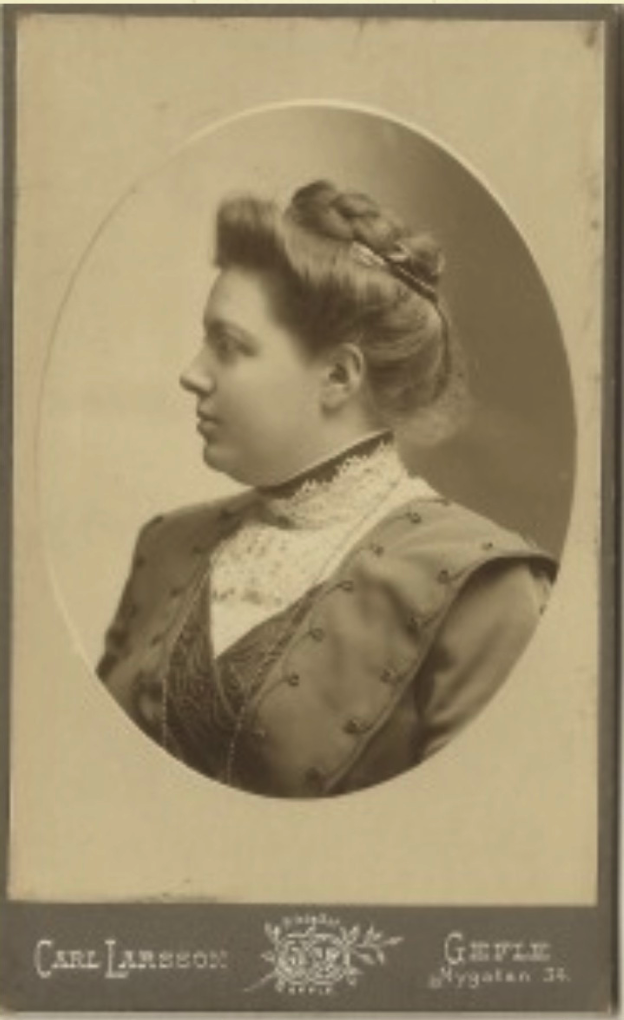
Klara Lindh

Klara Augusta Bernhardina Lindh (née Hemberg; 21 February 1877– 8 March 1914) was a Swedish suffragist. She coordinated the publication of a series of articles written by women interested in women's suffrage under the auspices of the National Association for Women's Suffrage (LKPR) in which she was a member of the central board. She also wrote a number of articles on the topic herself. As a result of her commitment, she became the driving force in the suffrage association in Gävle, a large city to the north of Stockholm. She died at the early age of 37 after undergoing an operation, five years before Swedish women obtained the right to vote.

== Biography ==
Born on 21 February 1877 in Stockholm, Klara Augusta Bernhardina Hemberg was the daughter of the factory owner Bengt Nilsson Hemberg and his wife Clara Charlotta née Karlsson. She was the youngest of the family's three children. She was brought up in a well-to-do business family in central Stockholm. When 16, she studied bookkeeping at Franz O. Ebel's business school. In February 1897, she became engaged to Karl Magnus Lindh who had studied journalism at the Stockholm University. They married the following November and moved to Gefle where Lindh had been appointed editor-in-chief of Gefle Dagblad in 1816. They had three children.

In 1907, Klara Lindh was commissioned by the LKPR to publish a series of articles designed to encourage politicians and the general public to understand why women should be entitled to vote. Written by 45 prominent Swedes of whom 40 were women, one article was published each month until 1920, making up a total of 129. Well-known figures in the suffrage movement wrote several articles; they included Frigga Carlberg (12 articles), Gulli Petrini (10) and Ellen Hagen (8). Some 35 newspapers, most politically liberal, participated in their publication. In an article Lindh herself wrote in 1912, she commented: "And until the goals are fully achieved, the women's own suffrage movement must not and shall not lose any of the dedicated, sacrificial work of its supporters." Elin Wägner who had also contributed to the series, commented on the importance of the series in a letter to LKPR chair Signe Bergman. Selected by Lindh and her colleague Gerda Modén, the articles were first published free of charge by Gefle Dagblad which sold its proofs to other newspapers. When the series ended in 1920, Modén reported on its overall success, including its profitability which resulted in a significant overall surplus.

In addition to her editing and writing, Lindh was the driving force behind the suffrage association in Gävle which she chaired from 1909 for the rest of her life. She died unexpectedly in Gävle on 8 March 1914 after undergoing an operation, possibly suffering from cancer.
