= Nina Benner-Anderson =

Swedish nurse, women's rights activist, suffragist, pacifist and politician

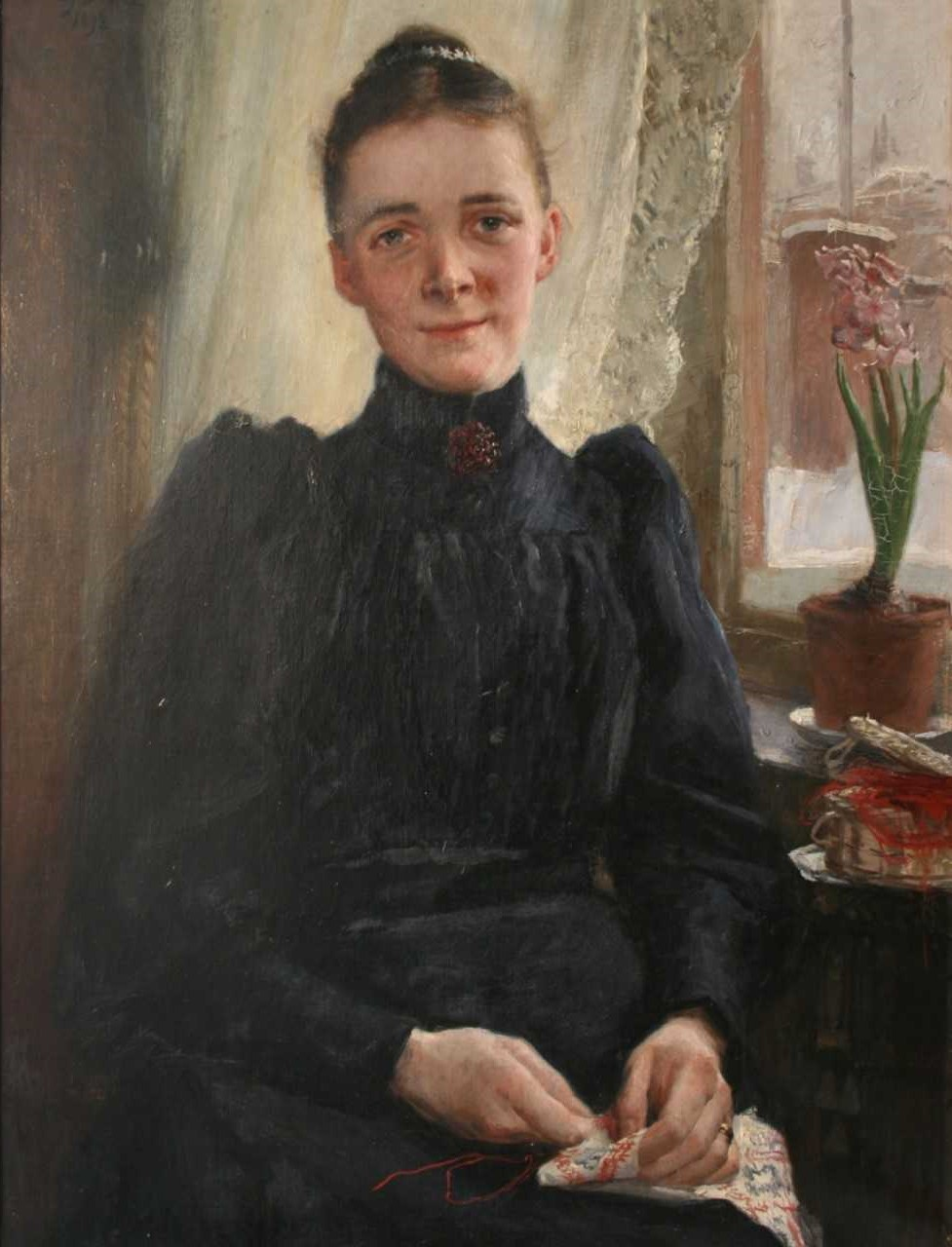
Painting of Nina Benner-Anderson by Fanny Brate (1893)

Nina Amanda Constantia Benner-Anderson (née Åhlande; 1865–1947) was a Swedish nurse, women's rights activist, suffragist, pacifist and politician. In 1906, She founded the Västerås branch of the National Association for Women's Suffrage in 1909, becoming a board member in 1909. In 1912, she was the first woman to be elected to the Västerås City Council. Benner-Anderson was one of the Swedish delegates at the 1915 Women's Peace Conference in the Hague and continued to support the cause for peace in the 1920s and 1930s. She was also politically active in the Free-minded National Association and a member for a time of the Liberal Women's Association (Frisinnade Kvinnors Riksförbund).

== Biography ==
Born on 30 May 1865 in Landskrona, Nina Amanda Constantia Åhlander was the daughter of Carl Magnus Åhlander and his wife Johanna Carolina née Nilsson. She was the oldest of four children. After her father died when she was ten, the family moved to Lund where she attended a private school. Following her mother's death when she was 18, she spent three years caring for her younger siblings before moving to Stockholm to study nursing at Drottningens sjuksköterskeskola from 1886 to 1887. On receiving her diploma, she served as a working nurse at the school for the next five years, two of which she spent at the Domnarvets Jernverk factory.

While studying, she had met the engineer Gustaf Anderson whom she married in 1883. They had four children together. Around 1905, they settled in Västerås where Nina Benner-Anderson became involved in the movements for women's rights, temperance and peace. In 1906, she was a co-founder of the local suffrage association (FKPR). She was elected to the board in 1909 and became president in 1912. As such, the same year she was put forward as the top women's candidate for the city council and was duly elected becoming the city's first woman town councillor. She was re-elected in 1916 when she was also elected chair of the local section of the LKPR. Following her husband's death in 1918, she moved to Bromma in Stockholm with her children.

Benner-Anderson was also deeply committed to the peace movement. While participating in the White Ribbon temperance movement, in 1912 she established a section devoted to peace work. In 1915, she was one of the Swedish delegates to participate in the Women's Peace Congress in The Hague. As a result, she became a board member of the Swedish section of the Women’s International League for Peace and Freedom until 1922. She participated in the Frankfurt conference on modern war methods in 1929 and in 1935 supported the Swedish First of September Movement (Första September-Rörelsen).

Nina Benner-Anderson died on 26 March 1947 in Västerås, aged 81. She was buried in the city's Östra kyrkogården (Eastern Cemetery).
