= Jenny Wallerstedt =

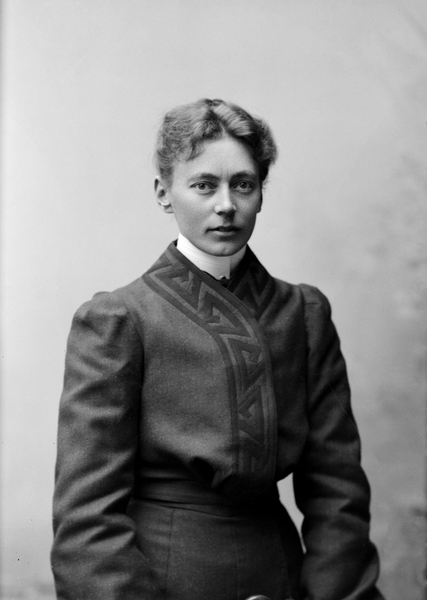
Jenny Wallerstedt

Jenny Maria Wallerstedt (1870–1963) was a Swedish schoolteacher, suffragist, women's rights activist and municipal politician. Remembered as the most active proponent of votes for women in Linköping, she chaired the local branch of the National Association for Women's Suffrage (LKPR) for 16 years and in 1919, representing the Moderate Party, was elected to the city council.

== Biography ==
Jenny Maria Wallerstedt was born on 11 April 1870 in Lungsund, a village near Filipstad, Värmland County, on 11 April 1870. When she was 20, she graduated from the Royal Teachers' Seminary in Stockholm.

In 1890, she started teaching English and French at Linköping's Elementary Girls' School. She published English and French textbooks and was active in school issues. From 1903, she chaired the newly established local branch of the National Association of Women's Suffrage (Sweden)|National Association of Women's Suffrage (LKPR) and later became a member of LKPR's central board, representing Östergotland.

Thanks to her language skills, she was able to participate in international suffrage conferences where she met suffrage activists from Germany, Britain, France and the United States. Impressed by the work of suffragettes in England, she communicated their approach to the Linköping Association. She was also active in the Fredrika Bremer Association's work on women's rights and participated in the Linköping committee on benefits for the poor.

In 1919, together with Sigrid Örn, Sigrid Tersmeden and Hedvig Thorell, she was elected to serve on the Linköping City Council. That year, she was also appointed principal of the Risberg Girls' High School in Örebro where she served until 1927.

Jenny Wallerstedt died in Örgryte, Gothenburg on 8 January 1963.
