= Karolina Själander =

Swedish suffragist and politician

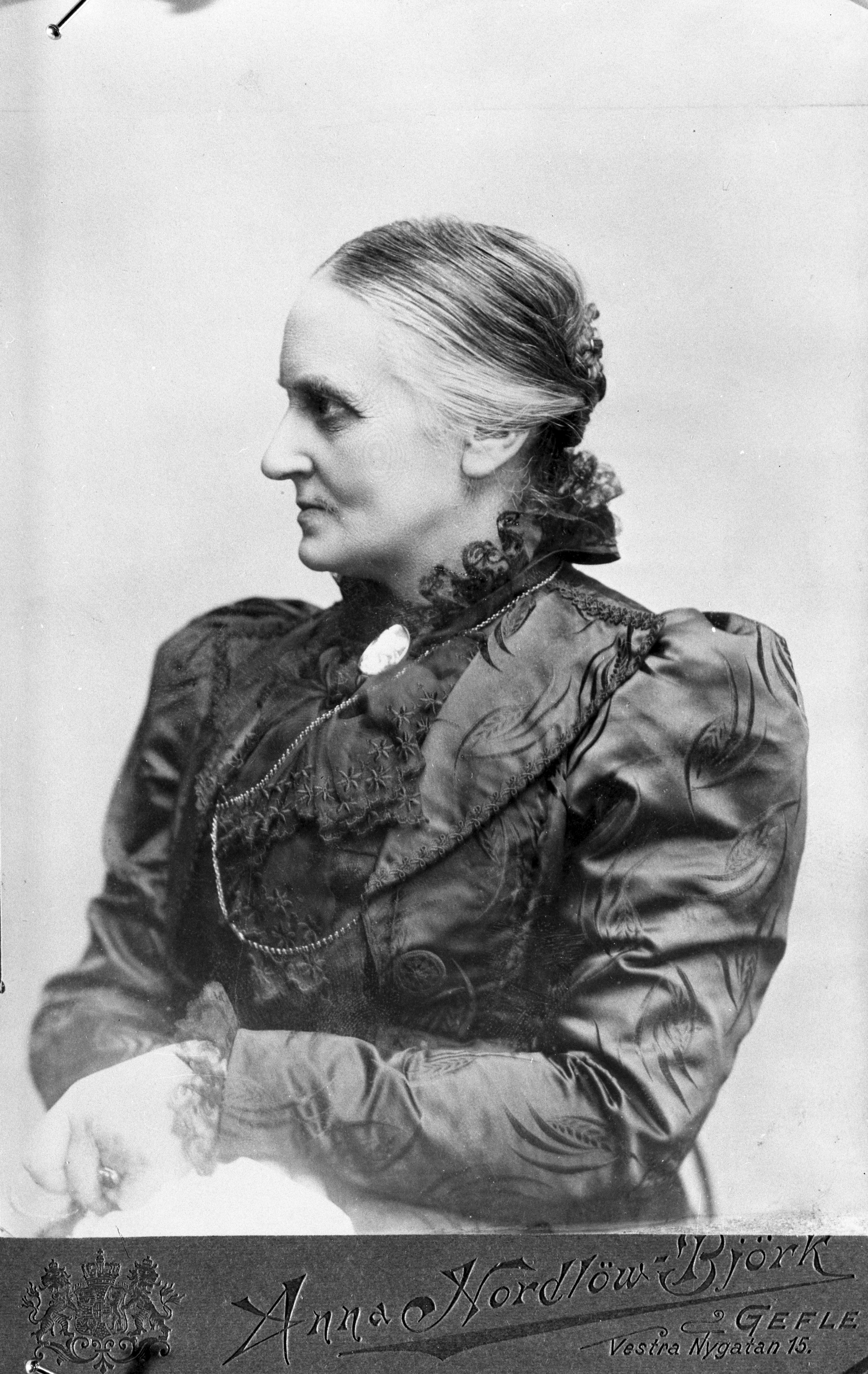
Karolina Själander

Karolina Kristina Själander (1841–1925) was a Swedish headmistress, women's rights activist, suffragist and politician. A strong supporter of school education for girls, she was headmistress of the Elsa Borg Girls' School in Gävle from 1870 to 1915. As a result of its increasing popularity, in 1878 she funded the construction of a larger building for the school, later known as the Själander School. In 1903, she founded and chaired the Gävle branch of the National Association for Women's Suffrage (LKPR) and in 1910 was elected to the Gävle City Council.

== Biography ==
Born in Gävle on 12 September 1841, Karolina Kristina Själander was the daughter of the successful fishing operator Erik Martin Själander and his wife Carolina Själander née Sjöström. She was the seventh child in the family and the first girl. After attending a junior school, when she was 12 she continued her education at a Bonne Amie Sundströms Pension, a girls' boarding school. Unusually for girls, she was interested in mathematics and geology, for which she received private tutoring. When her father died in 1869, she was the one who took over the family's bookkeeping.

In her twenties, Själander became seriously ill, probably with tuberculosis, requiring special treatment in Stockholm for several years. When she returned to Gävle, she began teaching at the Sunday school of the local Mission Convent Church. From 1870, she taught mathematics at the Elsa Borg School until Borg invited her in 1874 to run the school so that she could move to Stockholm. Själander continued as headmistress until 1915. As the number of pupils grew, she decided to use her inheritance to build a larger school which opened in 1878. It became known as the Själander School. In addition to running the school, she taught church history, mathematics, bookkeeping, Swedish and German.

Själander was also active in the Mission Covenant Church, in the KFUK (Sweden's YWCA), and in Vita Bandet (Sweden's women's temperance union). In 1903, she was one of the founders of the Gävle branch of the Women's Suffrage Association, which she chaired. In 1910, she was one of the first three women elected to Gävle's city council, representing the Moderate Party.

Karolina Själander died in Gävle on 8 December 1925.
