= Märta Bucht =

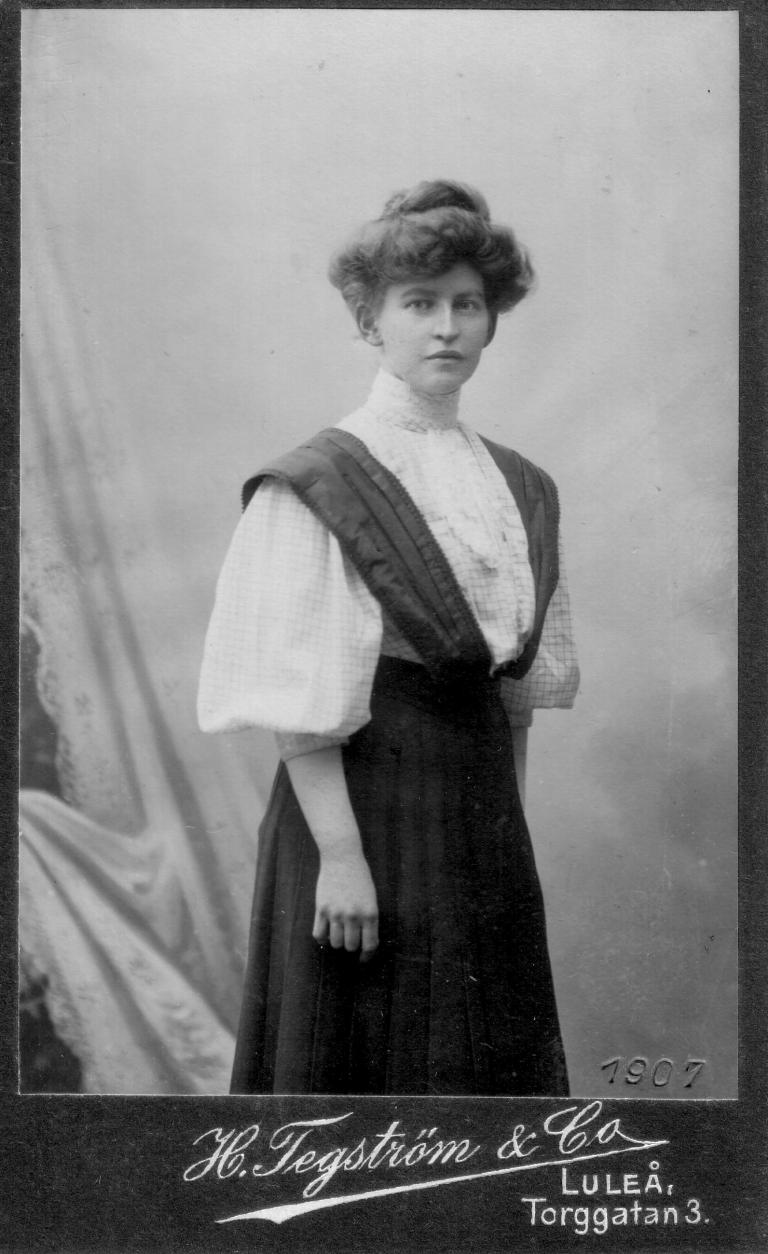
Märta Bucht (1907)

Märta Johanna Bucht (1882–1962) was a Swedish schoolteacher, suffragist and peace activist. From 1908, she chaired the Luleå branch of the Swedish Association for Women's Suffrage (FKPR). She was also active in the peace movement. In 1919, she was one of the 12 Swedes who attended the Zurich conference where the Women's International League for Peace and Freedom was established. Throughout her life, Bucht supported the temperance movement, becoming a member of the IOGT-NTO.

== Biography ==
Born on 23 October 1882 in Luleå, Märta Johanna Bucht was the daughter of the cartographer and town planner Gustaf Wilhelm Bucht (1849–1894) and his wife Rosina (Rosa) Maria née Högström (1853–1894). She was the fourth in a family of six children. After completing her schooling at a private school in Luleå, she worked for several years as a governess in Malmberget. Following her father's death in 1894, her former headmistress covered the cost of her training as a schoolteacher at the Privata Högre Lärarinneseminariet in Stockholm from 1901 to 1903.

On receiving her teaching diploma, Bucht returned to Luleå where she became a substitute teacher at the girls' school until she was engaged by Statens normalskola för flickor in Stockholm. In 1907, she was appointed to a permanent post at the girls' school in Luleå where she taught Swedish, German, geography and singing. She was a particularly active member of the school's staff, participating in the school's associations, festivities and theatricals. She was appointed deputy mistress in 1933, a position she help until her retirement in 1948. Thereafter she continued to take on assignments as a substitute.

Shortly after its establishment in 1907, Bucht was elected chair of the Luleå branch of the Swedish women's suffrage association, participating both locally and at the national level. Her interest in the movement is evident from the correspondence she maintained with Frigga Carlberg, an active member of the national association and chair of the Gothenburg branch.Thanks to a friendship she had established with the peace activist Matilda Widegren while studying, she joined the Swedish peace movement which developed as a result of the suffering in World War I. She was one of the 12 Swedish participants at the 1919 Women's Peace Conference in Zurich, Switzerland. An active member of the Swedish central board, she chaired the Luleå branch for 40 years. She was also active in the local branch of the temperance association.

Måarta Bucht died in Luleå on 1 November 1962 and in buried in the city's Innerstad cemetery.
