= Elsa Alkman =

Swedish women's rights activist and writer

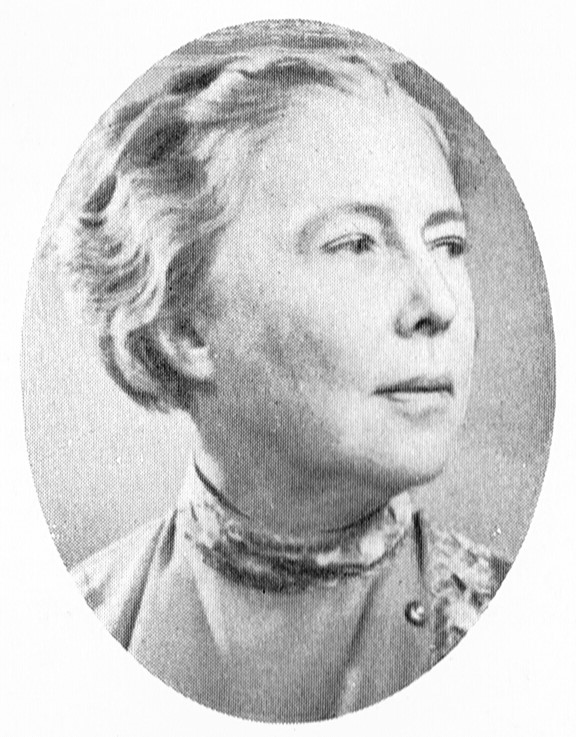
Alkman, c. 1930

Elsa Anna Maria Alkman, née Ahlström (18 November 1878 – 21 February 1975), was a Swedish women's rights activist, suffragist and writer. While living in Eslöv, she became an active member of the local branch of the National Association for Women's Suffrage (LKPR), lecturing, writing and organizing events. In 1916, she wrote a report on how Danish women had voted in a referendum after obtaining the right to vote. She continued to contribute to the extension of women's rights in the 1920s after Swedish women had achieved voting rights. In the 1930s, she and her husband settled in Norrköping where she played the violin and composed music for local concerts.

== Biography ==
Born on 18 November 1878 in Dalarna, Elsa Anna Maria Ahlström was the only child of the civil engineer Otto Theodor Ahlström (1848–1906) and his wife Clara Elisabeth née Guinchard (1850–1932). Brought up in a well-to-do home, as a result of her father's work on railway traffic, she spent her childhood in Täby, Gothenburg, Stockholm, Härnösand and Sölvesborg.

In 1897, she entered the Royal Swedish Academy of Music in Stockholm where she studied the violin, graduating in 1900. After an unsuccessful period as a music teacher in Sölvesborg, she worked for a bank in Malmö. There she met the pharmacist Olof Alkman (1872–1960) whom she married in 1906. They moved to Eslöv where in 1907 she joined the local branch of the LKPR. From 1911 to 1913, she was a board member of LKPR's branch for Skåne.

Alkman took a serious interest in women's suffrage, convinced that it was only a matter of time until it would be granted. In December 1916, she visited Denmark to observed how Danish women were voting for the first time in the referendum. She communicated her findings in an article published in the LKPR's journal Rösträtt för kvinnor. She emphasized how happy all classes of women were to cast their votes and hoped it would not be long before Swedish women could follow in their footsteps. While in Skåne, she wrote the novel En oförbätterlig (1911) inspired by her suffrage work. Recounting how an operetta singer struggled for the same rights as men in a small town, it was well received good reviews. In September 1916, she gave birth to a daughter, Inga Linnea.

In the mid-1920s, the couple moved to Norrköping where Olof had received an appointment. Elsa Alkman was able to revive her interest in music, taking harmony lessons at the conservatory and composing works for local concerts. In the 1930s, she joined the city's branch of the Union of Liberal Women, supporting arrangements and funding for refugees arriving in Sweden.

Aged 96, Elsa Alkman died on 21 February 1975 in Norrköping where she is buried in the local cemetery.
