= Olga Segerberg =

Swedish photographer and suffragist

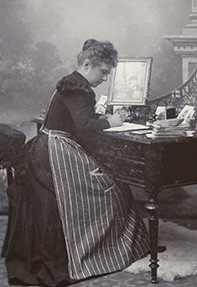
Olga Segerberg (c. 1901)

Olga Constantia Segerberg (1868–1951) was a Swedish photographer and suffragist. In 1892, she opened a studio in Karlskrona but when her brother-in-law who was also a photographer died in 1901, she took over his studio in Arvika, later opening branches in the surrounding area. An active proponent of women's rights, Segerberg chaired the Arvika branch of the National Association for Women's Suffrage (LKPR) and was active as a photographer in LKPR's branch in Färgelanda. Segerberg and her partner Brita Crone were featured in an exhibition at the Sågudden Open Air Museum in 2020.

== Biography ==
Born in Falköping on 11 November 1868, Olga Constantia Segerberg was the youngest daughter of Fredrik Larsson Segerberg and his wife Kajsa née Jonsdotter. Her elder sister Malvina married the photographer Olof Andersson from Arvika.

In 1892, Segerberg opened her own photo studio in Karlskrona. Three years later, she moved to Arvika where she continued to work as a photographer. When her brother in law Olga Andersson died in 1901, she took over his studio, opening branches in Charlottenberg, Åmotfors, Trossnäs and Färgelanda. In 1935, she acquired a second studio in Arvika which had belonged to the photographer A. Rydberg.

Segerberg is remembered in particular for her contributions to the women's movement. Active in the National Association for Women's Suffrage (LKPR), she chaired the Arkiva branch and also participated in the meetings of the branch at Färgelanda where she had established a studio. She lived with her partner Brita Crona in Arvika. Crona who was a nurse and childcare inspector assisted Segerberg with her photography and contributed numerous articles to LKPR's journal Rösträtt för Kvinnor.

In 2020, the Sågudden Open Air Museum in 2020 in Arvika presented an exhibition on the city's early female photographers, devoting special attention to Segerberg and Crona.

Olga Segerberg died on 12 December 1951 in Arvika and is buried in the city cemetery.
