= Kristina Borg =

Swedish newspaper publisher and suffragist

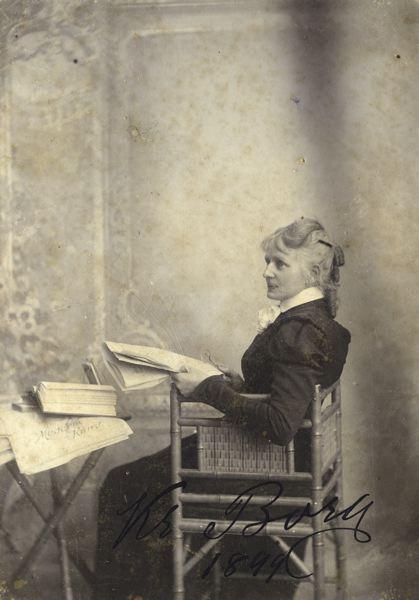
Kristina Borg (1899)

Kristina Borg née Jönsdotter (1844–1928) was a Swedish newspaper publisher, suffragist and peace activist who became prominent in Helsingborg in the early 20th century. In 1869, she married Fredrik Borg, the editor of Öresundsposten, a daily newspaper published in the city. When her husband died in 1895, she acquired the newspaper, becoming its publisher in 1913. In addition to considerable success with the paper, Borg chaired the Helsingborg branch of the National Association for Women’s Suffrage and was also on the board of the national organization. An early proponent of the peace movement, she was a member of Sveriges Kvinnliga Fredsförening, the women's peace movement. She was one of two Swedish delegates to attend the 1906 peace congress in Milan.

== Biography ==
Born in Västra Broby near Helsingborg on 3 September 1844, Kristina Jönsdotter was the daughter of Jöns Andersson, a farmer, and his wife Elna née Pehrsdotter. She was the sixth child in a family of eight. In the 1860s, while a clerk at the daily newspaper Öresunds-Posten she met her husband to be Frederik Theodor Borg, the paper's owner and editor-in-chief, whom she married in 1869.

When her husband died in 1895, Kristina Borg became the paper's owner and in 1913, its publisher and editor-in-chief. From 1906, she had edited the weekly "Vara hem" supplement on homes. In connection with Borg's 75th birthday in 1919, Karolina Widerström praised "her economic ability and her journalistic gifts" in an article published in Rösträtt för kvinnor. Borg ran the paper until shortly before her death when, aged 84 and facing increasing competition, she decided to sell it.

In addition to considerable success with the paper, Borg chaired the Helsingborg branch of the National Association for Women's Suffrage and was on the board of the national organization. An early proponent of the cause for peace, she was a member of Sveriges Kvinnliga Fredsförening, the Swedish women's peace movement. She was one of two Swedish delegates to attend the 1906 peace congress in Milan.

Kristina Borg died in Helsingborg on 9 September 1928.
