= Aurore Pihl =

Swedish educator and suffragist

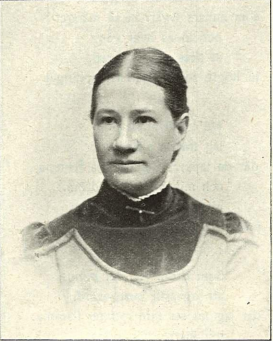
Aurore Pihl

Aurora (Aurore) Marie Pihl (1850–1938) was a Swedish educator and suffragist. She is remembered for establishing a girls' school in Norrköping in 1880 and for contributing significantly to the campaign for women's suffrage. In 1903, she co-founded Norrköping's Women's Suffrage Association where she was deputy chair until 1910. She shared management of the Norra flickläroverket until 1890 after which she was the sole principal until her retirement in 1916.

== Early life and education ==
Born in Hällestad, Östergötland, in south-eastern Sweden on 24 September 1850, Aurora Maria Pihl was the daughter of the crown bailiff Per Johan Pihl and his wife Aurora Ulrika Kristina née André. She went to school in Askersund until she was 13, living with an aunt while she was there. Hoping to become a schoolteacher, she received private education until 1877 when she entered the Royal Seminary, a teachers' training college for women in Stockholm. She received her teaching diploma in 1880.

== Career ==
On graduating, she returned to Östergötland where, together with fellow student Gerda von Friesen, she founded a girls' school called Norrköpings nya läroverk för flickor (Norrköping's New Girls' School) but generally known as Pilhska skolan (the Pihl School). Located in the workers' district of the industrial city, it started modestly with just 12 pupils but grew quickly, moving into larger premises two years later. It soon became recognized as one of the country's best private schools.

In addition to teaching, Pihl became a committed member of the local women's suffrage movement, becoming deputy chair of the association. She fought for developments which would allow married women to work and to become active in areas reserved for men. She also strove for equal wages for men and women, commenting "Same pay for the same work, if it is performed equally well and with the same competency by men and women".

From 1890 until her retirement in 1916, Pihl was principal of Norrköpings nya läroverk för flickor and she remained deputy chair of the women's association until 1910.

Aurore Pihl died on 26 April 1938 Strålsnäs in Boxholm.
