= Ellen Sandelin =

Swedish physician (1862–1907)

Ellen Beata Elisabeth Sandelin
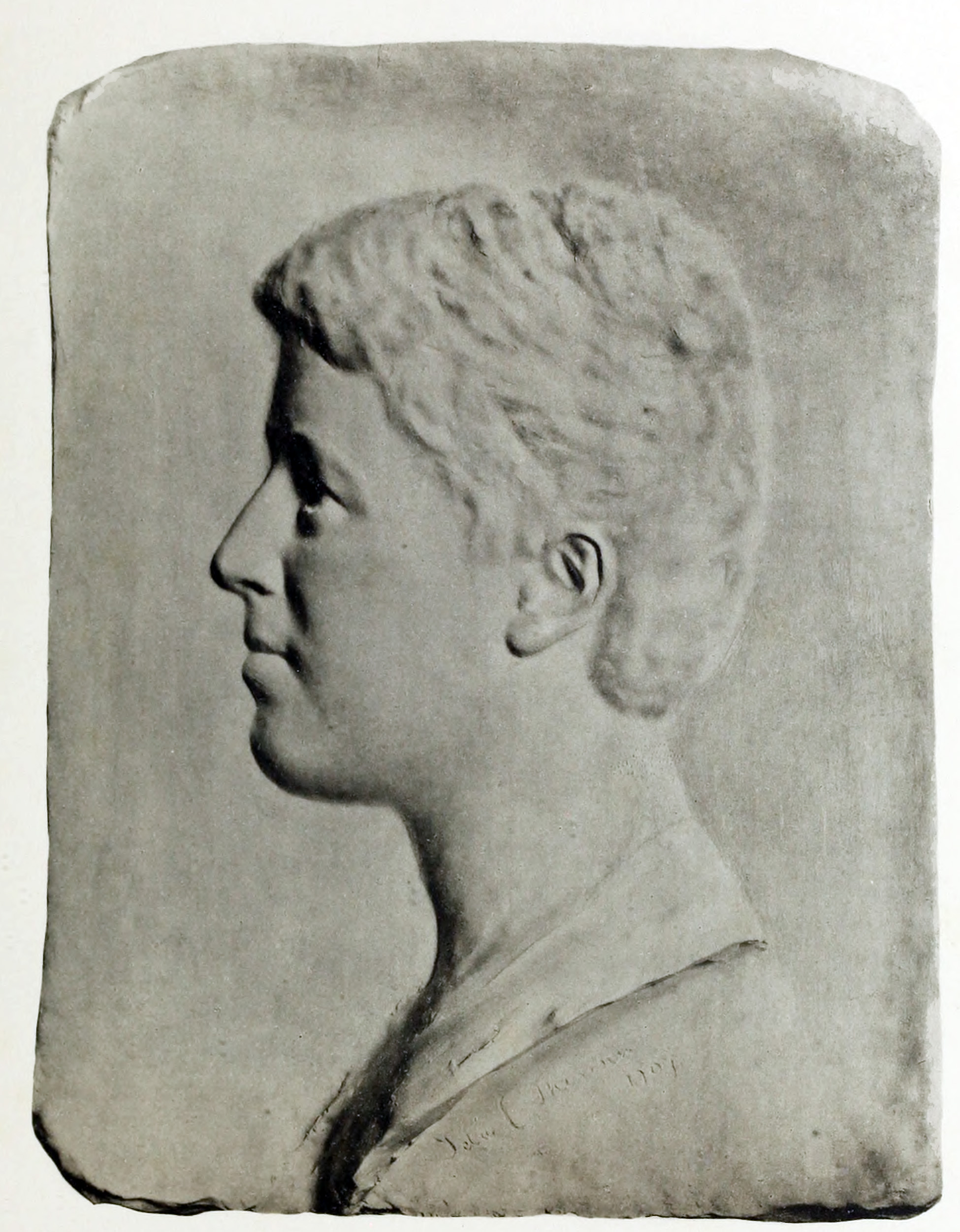
- Sandelin relief, c. 1907
- Born: 19 July 1862; Karlskoga parish, Sweden-Norway
- Died: 7 August 1907 (aged 45); Stockholm, Sweden
- Burial place: Northern Cemetery, Stockholm
- Occupation: Physician
- Parents: Carl Henrik Sandelin (1824–1871) (father); Beda Collett (mother)

Ellen Beata Elisabeth Sandelin (19 July 1862 – 7 August 1907) was a Swedish physician who practiced in Stockholm, and was also a teacher in physiology and health education. She received her medical license in 1897.

== Biography ==
She was the daughter of physician Carl Henrik Sandelin (1824–1871) and Beda Collett.

Sandelin graduated from the Wallinska girls school in Stockholm in 1881. (Wallinska was one of the first five schools in Sweden where girls could get a formal academic education, and it was the first allowed to offer girls the entrance exam (called Studentexamen) for university admission.) Sandelin went on to teach at a girls' school in Karlstad, Sweden, and then attended the University of Kristiania, later renamed University of Oslo, Norway.

Sandelin came of age just as the study of medicine was being made available to Swedish women. As she wrote in 1899,

"... a Royal Ordinance was issued, in 1870, by which women obtained a right to matriculate to pursue medical studies, graduate in medical degrees at the universities, and practise as physicians.... In 1873 Upsala University admitted its first female student of medicine..."

In 1885, Sandelin began her medical studies in Uppsala, Sweden. There, she earned a bachelor's degree in medicine in 1891 and in 1897 received her medical license at the Karolinska Institute in Stockholm.

In that same year, Sandelin became a practicing physician in Stockholm and was also a teacher in physiology and health education in several educational institutes for women as well as doctors at city schools. To disseminate knowledge in physiology and hygiene in wide circles, she held public lectures that proved popular. According to Levin, "Ellen Sandelin called for teaching that taught the child to 'see and understand nature,' the traits of nature, and thus also learn to respect them..."

== Later years ==
Sandelin also participated actively in the women's movement, was a member of the first National Association for Women's Suffrage and gave lectures at the women's congresses in London 1899 and in Berlin 1904.

She died 7 August 1907 in Stockholm at 45 years of age and is buried in Northern Cemetery there.

== Selected published works ==
- The Medical Training of Women in Sweden (1899)
- On Some Infectious Diseases and Their Social Dangers (1902)
- On the Moral Education of Youth (in the series "Popular Scientific Dissertations," 23, 1902)
- The Women's Body, its Building and Hygiene (1903)
