= Sigrid Kruse =

Swedish educator, children's writer and suffragist

Sigrid Maria Kruse
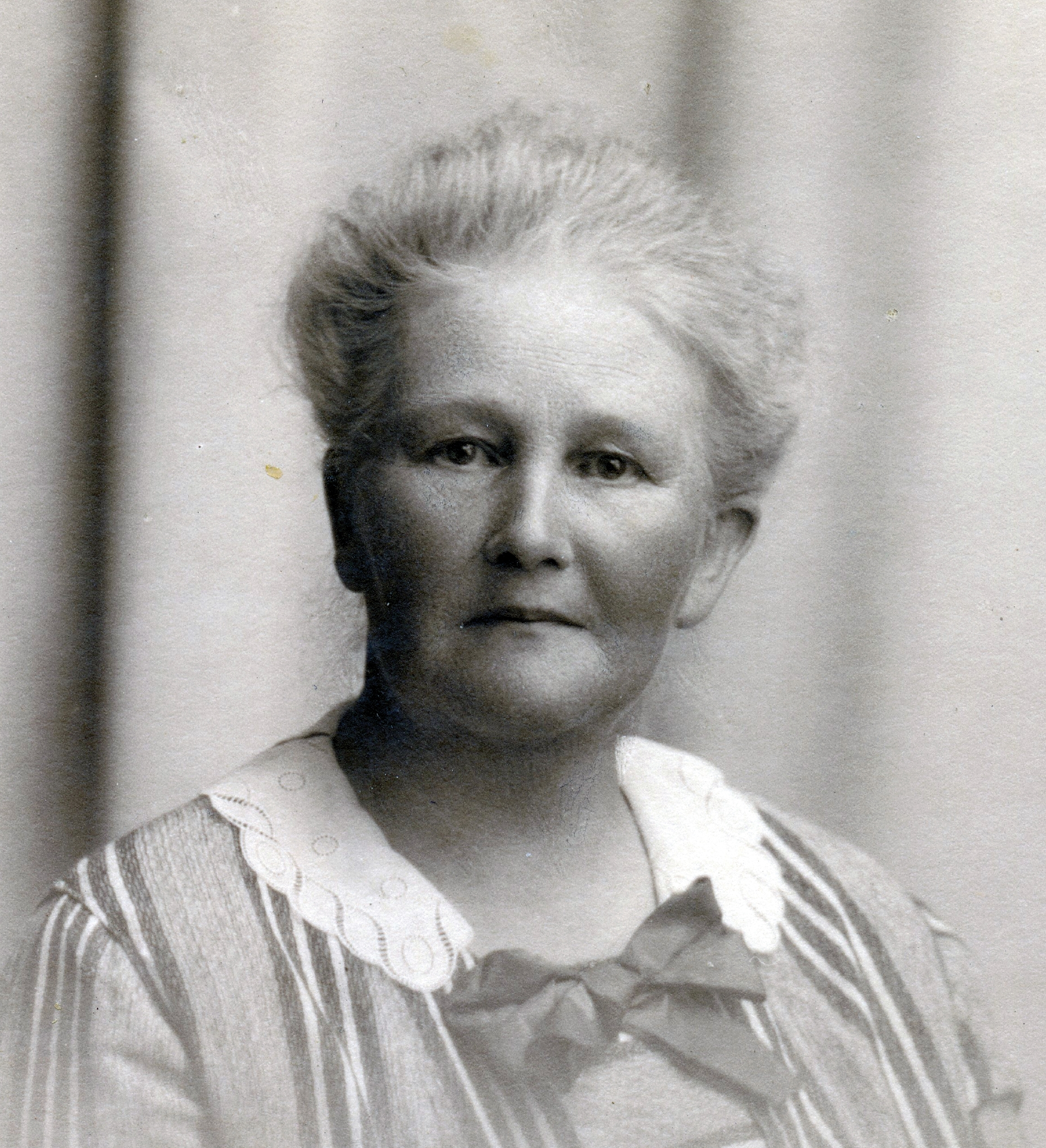
- Born: 2 September 1867; Norra Mellby, near Sösdala, Hässleholm Municipality, Sweden
- Died: 19 September 1950 (aged 83); Vrigstad, Sweden
- Occupations: Educator, children's writer, suffragist
- Known for: Advocacy for women's suffrage in Sweden
- Political party: Liberal People's Party
- Parent(s): Frans Oskar Kruse; Anna Maria Mathilda Borgström

Sigrid Maria Kruse (2 September 1867 – 19 September 1950) was a Swedish educator, children's writer and suffragist. In addition to her teaching activities in Karlskrona, she strongly supported the suffrage movement, contributing articles to magazines, publishing brochures and speaking at meetings. In 1904, she established a local suffrage association and took part in the important Stockholm meeting on suffrage in 1909. From 1912 to 1926, she represented the Liberal People's Party in Karlskrona.

== Biography ==
Born on 2 September 1867 in Norra Mellby near Sösdala in Hässleholm Municipality, Sigrid Maria Kruse was the daughter of the landowner Frans Oskar Kruse (1827–1901) and his wife Anna Maria Mathilda née Borgström. She was one of six children. After training to be a teacher in Kalmar and graduating in 1888, in 1890 Sigrid Kruse moved to Karlskrona where she lived with her younger sister Ester who also became a teacher.

From 1890, Kruse devoted her entire professional life to teaching at the Fischerströmska girls' school in Karlskrona. In addition to her teaching activities, she wrote several informative books for children and young people including Från vår storhetstid: historiska berättelser för ungdom (From our Glorious Past: Historical Stories for Young People, 1890). She also contributed articles to magazines such as Idun and Rösträtt för kvinnor, the latter published by the National Association for Women's Suffrage (LKPR).

As a strong proponent of women's suffrage, she wrote longer articles, some published as brochures. These included Kvinnan och samhällsarbetet (Women and Social Work, 1905) and Varför böra de svenska kvinnorna skriva sina namn på L.K.P.R:s opinionslistor? (Why Should Swedish Women Write Their Names on LKPR's Opinion Lists, 1913), providing arguments in support of giving women the right to vote. In 1904, she established and headed the women's suffrage association in Karlskrona. In 1909, she participated at Sweden's first major meeting on suffrage, linking the concept of women's suffrage with that of temperance, another cause she followed. In 1912, she was elected to the municipal council in Karlskrona, maintaining the position until her retirement in 1926.

In 1930, together with her sister Ester, she moved to the villa in Vrigstad they had built as a summer residence. She died in Vrigstad on 19 September 1950 and is buried in the Norra Mellby cemetery.
