= Anna-Clara Romanus-Alfvén =

Swedish female physician

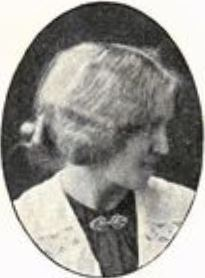
Anna-Clara Romanus-Alfvén

Anna-Clara Romanus-Alfvén (24 November 1874 – 9 November 1947) was a pioneering Swedish female physician, schoolteacher, suffragette and women's rights activist. After graduating as a medical doctor in 1906, she was the first woman to open a practice in Norrköping, frequently treating her poorer patients free of charge. In 1907, Romanus-Alfvén joined the local branch of the National Association for Women's Suffrage (LKPR), chairing the organization until 1919. She also headed the women's council in Norrköping, providing support for disadvantaged women and children.

== Biography ==
Born on 24 November 1874 in Landskrona, Anna-Clara Romanus was the daughter of the organist and music teacher Johan Romanus Petersson (1833–1914) and his wife Johanna Maria née Reinholdsdatter (1845–1935), a schoolteacher. She was the second of the family's three children. At the girls' grammar school in Karlskrona, she was inspired by the novelist and Nobel Prize winner Selma Lagerlöf. Despite her parents' initial opposition to her wish to become a teacher, they eventually agreed. After matriculating in Malmö, she trained to be a schoolmistress in Kalmar. Thereafter, she worked as a teacher in Eskilstuna where she was able to work towards studying medicine in order to become a doctor.

In 1898, she embarked on studies at the Karolinska Institute, graduating as a physician in 1906. She decided to move to the industrial city of Norrköping where she opened a practice in the city's working-class district. It proved to be a great success, especially as many women preferred to have a female doctor. She frequently treated single mothers and their children free of charge as they would otherwise have been unable to receive medical care.

Romanus-Alfvén was also a keen supporter of women's rights. In 1907, she joined the Norrköping branch of the women's suffrage movement, lecturing on girls' upbringing, childcare and sexual hygiene. That year she married fellow physician Johannes Alfvén (1878–1944), brother of the composer Hugo Alfvén. They had two children together. In 1910 she was elected chair of the suffrage association, a post she retained until Swedish women were successful in obtaining voting rights in 1919.

She also chaired Norrköping's local women's council for several years, worked as a school doctor at Norrköpings nya läroverk för flickor (Norrköping's New Girls' School), and taught healthcare at various schools and institutions in the vicinity. In the 1920s, she tried unsuccessfully to be elected to parliament for the liberals.

Anna-Clara Romanus-Alfvén died on 9 November 1947 in Essinge, Stockholm.
