= Augusta Tonning =

Swedish politician

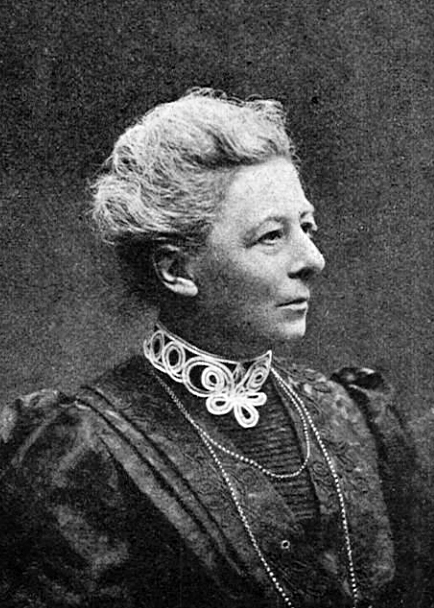
August Tonning (c.1907)

Hilda Augusta Tonning née Grönvall (1857–1932) was a Swedish schoolteacher and suffragist. Together with her husband Pär Tonning, from 1879 she taught at folk high schools, first in Fornby near Borlänge and then at the school they established in Falun. After her husband's death, in 1898 she set up a commercial vegetable garden near Ronneby. In 1902, she joined the women's movement and went on to establish a number of suffrage associations, actively campaigning for women's voting rights. During the First World War, she also supported efforts towards peace. Even after women received the right to vote in the 1920s, Tonning continued to support women's rights, giving courses at the property she had built near Ronneby, where she also offered hospitality to former suffragists.

== Early life ==
Born in Lund on 14 August 1857, Hilda Augusta Grönvall was the daughter of the teacher and later parish priest Johan Henrik Grönvall (1817–1894) and his wife Julia Lovisa Ulrika née Adrian (1826–1923). She was the youngest in a family of four children. When she was five, the family moved to Västra Tomarp near Trelleborg where her father had been appointed parson.

== Teaching and gardening ==
In 1879, she married her childhood friend Pär Tonning who had been appointed director of a folk school in Åkarp two years earlier. He proved to be a true soulmate, sharing her view that men and women should work together to improve society. In 1882, at Fornby folk high school she and her husband succeeded in teaching girls who had been confirmed but this arrangement did not prove acceptable. As a result, in 1885 the couple opened a private girls' high school called Hästbergs qvinliga folkhögskola. Augusta Tonning taught handicrafts, mathematics and bookkeeping. After her husband began to suffer from poor health with long periods in hospital, she took over all the traditionally male tasks, including running the small farm which they had established on the premises. This continued for ten years until her husband died in June 1895.

In 1898, Tonning moved to Blekinge where her brother, the regimental physician Johan Grönvall, lived with his wife and three daughters. She established a market garden, transporting her vegetables by horse and cart for sale on the town square in Ronneby.

== Suffrage ==
After attending the Nordic Women's Rights Meeting in Kristiania in 1902, Tonning set her future on supporting rights for women on the same basis as those enjoyed by men. As this included suffrage, she became an active member of the Föreningen för kvinnans politiska rösträtt (Association for Women's Suffrage) and the Swedish Association for Women's Suffrage, both established in 1903. She created a total of 35 women's associations in the Ronneby area and throughout southern Sweden. From 1911, she moved into the centre of the town, devoting her entire life to campaigning for votes for women. All in all, she broke all records, visiting 195 different venues and making 105 speeches in support of a petition for women's suffrage. She also campaigned for peace, participating in Peace Sunday on 27 June 1915. The same month she completed Solvik, a property she had built in the fishing village of Bökevik which could only be reached by sea. It became popular with suffragettes who had attended meetings in Ronneby. Even after women obtained the right to vote, Tonning continued to support the women's cause, running an open house for former suffragettes.

August Tonning died in her Villa Solvik near Ronneby on 11 August 1932.
