= Frigga Carlberg =

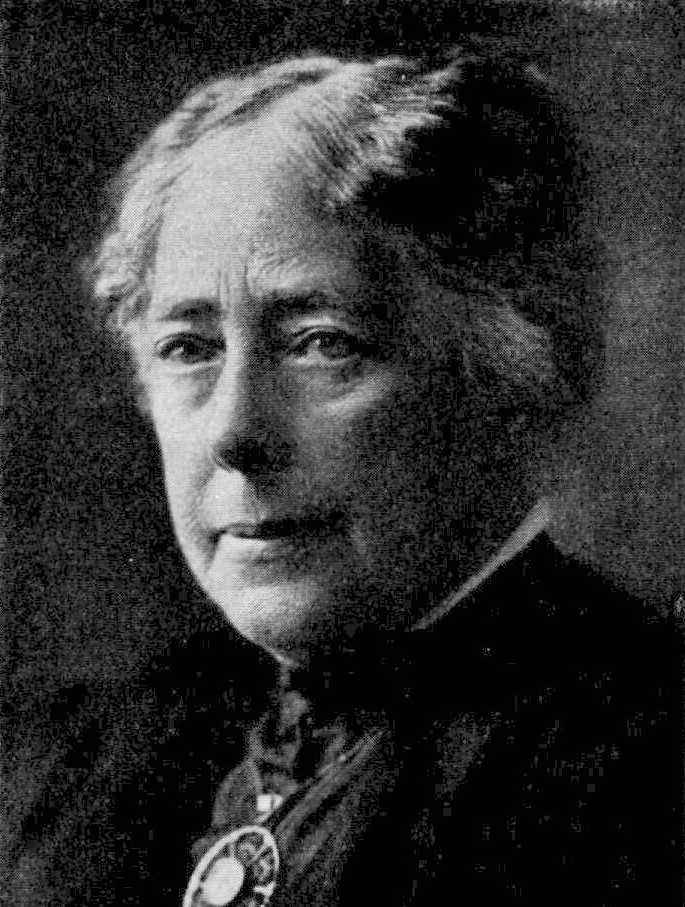
- Frigga Carlberg
- Born: Anna Fredrika Lundgren; 10 August 1851; Falkenberg, Sweden
- Died: 3 October 1925 (aged 74); Stockholm, Sweden
- Occupations: Writer, suffragist
- Spouse: Andreas Carlberg (m. 1876)
- Awards: Illis quorum

Anna Fredrika "Frigga" Carlberg (née Lundgren; 10 August 1851 – 3 October 1925) was a Swedish writer, social worker, feminist and advocate for women's suffrage. She was a member of the central committee of the National Association for Women's Suffrage from 1903 to 1921 and chair of the Gothenburg branch of the Swedish Society for Woman Suffrage from 1902 to 1921.

== Biography ==
Frigga Carlberg was born in the parish of Falkenberg in Halland County, Sweden. She was born into a wealthy family but had great difficulty to persuade her father to allow her to study. She moved to Gothenburg after her marriage to the post official Andreas Carlberg (1850–1921) in 1876.

Carlberg engaged in women's issues and social work from her arrival in Gothenburg, and became an important member of the Gothenburg's Women's Association (Göteborgs Kvinnoförening), which was founded in 1884 as the first women's association in Gothenburg. She founded Sällskapet Myrornas barnhem, an organisation who provided homes for healthy children to parents infected with tuberculosis, chaired an organisation for female social workers and became a member of the Swedish Poor care association.

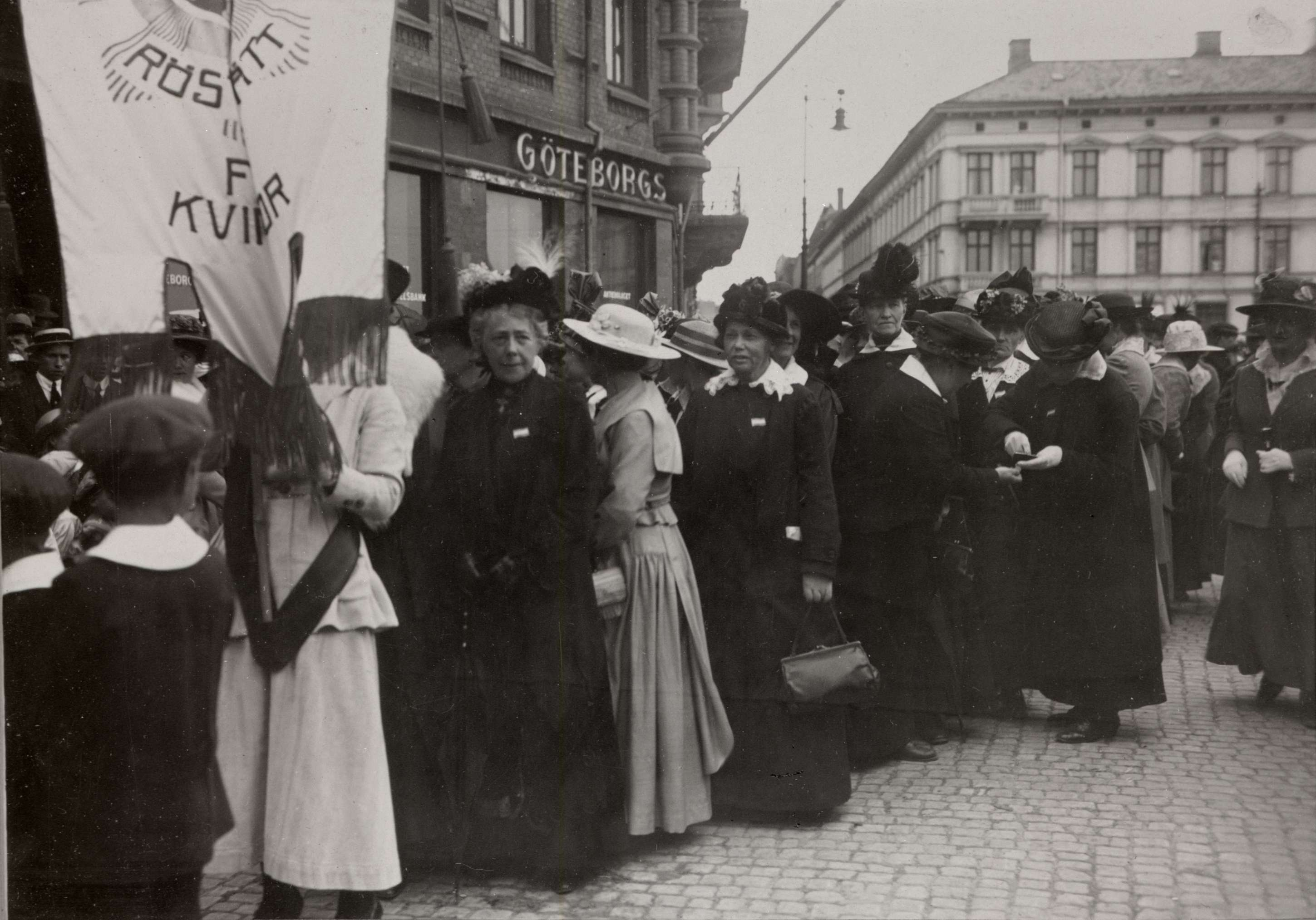
Frigga Carlberg and others demonstrating for women's suffrage in Gothenburg, June 1918.

=== Suffrage work ===
Carlberg became the central figure within social and politically interested women's circles in Gothenburg, and when the Swedish Society for Woman Suffrage was founded in 1902, she took the initiative for the establishment of the Gothenburg section and was elected as its chairman for its entire duration in 1903–1921.

She was well informed about in particular the British and American suffrage movement, and once invited English suffragette Sylvia Pankhurst (1882–1960) for a lecture. The Gotheburg branch was known as the most radical of all branches of the Swedish suffrage movement; while the policy of the Swedish suffragists in general was opposed to the tactics of the British suffragettes, whom they considered inconstructive to the cause, Frigga Carlberg and the Gothenburg branch was known to be more radical than in the rest of Sweden when it concerned their methods. In 1918, the Gothenburg ranch organized the only street demonstration ever held by the Swedish suffrage movement.

She also represented Sweden at several international conferences of women suffrage: first as a member of the Swedish Society for Woman Suffrage, and the last time, 9th Conference of the International Woman Suffrage Alliance in Rome in 1923, as the representative of the Swedish government.

=== Writer ===
As an author of novels and plays, she described both women's issues and the living conditions of the poor, which influenced policy. Her novel För rättfärdighets skull (1918), alongside the novel Pennskaftet (1910) by Elin Wägner (1882–1949), is considered one of the more notable novel of the Swedish suffrage movement (Kvinnors kamp för rösträtt).

=== Awards ===
Carlberg was awarded the Illis quorum in 1921.

== Other sources ==
- Svenska män och kvinnor: biografisk uppslagsbok (Stockholm: Albert Bonniers Förlag. 1944)

== Related reading ==
- Christina Florin (2006) Kvinnor får röst (Stockholm : Atlas) ISBN 9173891509
- Elin Wägner (1910) Pennskaftet (Bokförlaget Atlantis) ISBN 9174867547
