= Hjelm =

Hjelm may refer to:

== People ==
- Ari-Juhani Hjelm (b. 1962), Finnish football coach and former player
- Claus Winter Hjelm (1797 - 1871), Norwegian judge
- Fanny Hjelm (1858-1944) Swedish visual artist.
- Jonne Hjelm (b. 1988), Finnish footballer
- Keve Hjelm (1922 – 2004), Swedish actor and film director
- Lena Hjelm-Wallén (b. 1943), Swedish Social Democratic politician
- Peter Jacob Hjelm (1746 - 1813), Swedish chemist
- Titus Hjelm (b. 1974), Finnish academic and musician

== Places ==
- Hjelm (island), Danish island
