= Waldemar Hammenhög =

Swedish writer

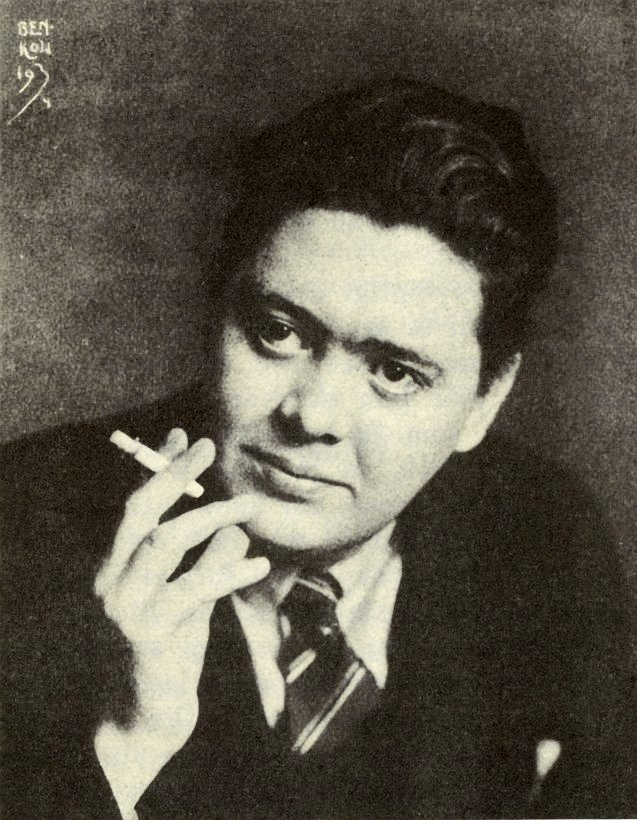
- Hammenhög in 1934
- Born: Per Waldemar Hammenhög; 18 April 1902; Stockholm, Sweden
- Died: 1 November 1972 (aged 70); Stockholm, Sweden
- Occupation: Novelist
- Writing career
- Notable works: Esther och Albert (1930); Pettersson & Bendel (1931); Torken (1951); Omne animal (1952)

Per Waldemar Hammenhög (18 April 1902 – 1 November 1972) was a Swedish writer and novelist. The trivial, petty bourgeois urban environment forms the basis of many of his early realistic novels, whereas his later works turned towards religious and moral issues. Writing more than 40 novels, Hammenhög is probably best known for Pettersson & Bendel (1931), a humorous novel adapted twice to screen.

== Life and work ==
Born in Stockholm in 1902 as Waldemar Anderson, he was the son of foreman Per Anderson and his wife Lydia Källgren. After graduating from the Högre realläroverket å Östermalm high school in Stockholm in 1919, Hammenhög worked as an office boy, and later office clerk until 1930. He left his job as a clerk after he was awarded first-prize in a novel competition organized by the Stockholm-based publishing house Natur & Kultur with his debut novel Esther och Albert. He submitted the text under the pseudonym "Hammenhög", which became his official name in 1931.

Among Hammenhög's writing highlights is the humorous novel Petterson & Bendel (1931), adapted to screen in 1933 starring Adolf Jahr as Pettersson; and as P&B (1983) starring Stellan Skarsgård as Petterson and Allan Edwall as Bendel. Esther och Alberts äktenskap (1936) was also a success, adapted to screen as Ung man söker sällskap (1954), starring Ulf Palme and Gaby Stenberg.

In the late 1940s, Hammenhög's writing turned from realistic humor towards moral issues as he was struggling with personal alcoholism. His writing reached a turning point with Torken (1951), a novel about the failure of traditional alcoholic care. The novel is sometimes regarded as Hammenhög's second breakthrough as a novelist. A year later, Hammenhög published Omne animal (1952), a novel which implied that Hammenhög was heading toward Roman Catholicism. Most novels that followed often focused on religious and moral issues.

== Later life and death ==
Hammenhög's early commercial success as a productive novelist led to an extravagant lifestyle, and severe alcoholism. For years, alcoholic problems influenced his writing which was largely devastated by superficiality and haste. Later in life, Hammenhög became a "sober alcoholic". In that capacity, he frequently spoke in public about issues related to his alcoholism.

Writing in newspapers, his signature was W H-g. Hammenhög died in Stockholm in 1972 at the age of 70. He is buried at the Roman Catholic Cemetery, a part of the Norra begravningsplatsen Cemetery in Solna Municipality north of Stockholm.

== Bibliography ==
- 1930 – Esther och Albert (novel)
- 1931 – Pettersson & Bendel (novel)
- 1934 – Lindbergs (novel)
- 1935 – Svenske Apollo (novel)
- 1936 – Hustru eller lakej (novel)
- 1936 – Esthers och Alberts äktenskap (novel)
- 1937 – Anna Sevardt (novel)
- 1938 – Uppvaktningen och andra noveller
- 1938 – Det är bara ovanan, damen (novel)
- 1939 – Fallet Antonsson (detective novel)
- 1939 – Fallet Sehling (detective novel)
- 1939 – Löpande band (novel)
- 1940 – Kärälskeliga vänner (novel)
- 1941 – Svar med amatörfoto (novel)
- 1942 – Edens lustgård (short stories)
- 1942 – Erik, skogsluffaren (Sports book for youths)
- 1942 – Det var en gång en musiker (novel)
- 1943 – Nils, skolungdomsmästaren (Sports book for youths)
- 1944 – Pettersson & Bendels nya affärer (novel)
- 1944 – Olle, brottaren (Sports book for youths)
- 1945 – Sven, skidlöparen (Sports book for youths)
- 1946 – Hur mycket skall du ha (novel)
- 1947 – Halvbröderna (novel)
- 1949 – Livia (novel)
- 1950 – Sol och vår. Dokumentariska närbilder. (together with Bertel Janson)
- 1950 – Pettersson och Bendel på Sicilien (novel)
- 1951 – Torken (novel)
- 1952 – Omne Animal (novel)
- 1953 – I en fransk småstad
- 1953 – Lycklig resa (novel)
- 1954 – I en svensk sovstad
- 1955 – Älsken varandra (novel)
- Den eviga kärleken:
- 1957 – Inledningen till ett drama
- 1958 – Dramat
- Berättelsen om Petter Larsson:
- 1959 – Regeringsgatan
- 1960 – Helga Lekamens gränd
- 1961 – Ensittarvägen
- 1962 – Det är ingen mark att bygga på, min älskade
- 1962 – Berättelsen om Pisinus
- 1962 – I en sydengelsk by
- 1966 – Moderna Häxprocesser
- 1969 – Gustav Tjäder (novel)
- 1970 – Lallo (novel)
- 1971 – Herr Anderson med ett s (novel)
