= Elisabet Eurén =

Swedish educator and social reformer (1864–1939)

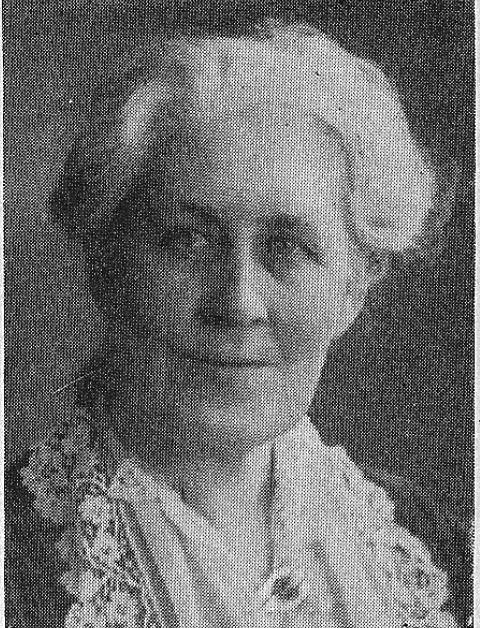
- Born: Elisabeth Matilda Vilhelmina Eurén; 9 July 1864; Stora Kopparberg, Sweden
- Died: 20 August 1939 (aged 75); Stockholm, Sweden
- Occupations: Lecturer; peace activist; suffragette

Elisabet Eurén (born Elisabeth Matilda Vilhelmina Eurén; 9 July 1864 – 20 August 1939) was a Swedish educator, women's rights and peace activist.

Born in Stora Kopparberg parish, Eurén graduated from a teaching seminary in Stockholm in 1884. After several years of teaching at different schools for girls and travelling abroad multiple times, she was appointed by Umeå public school training seminary in 1893. There, she instigated several reforms, including the opening of a school library and the establishment of a municipal workhouse.

In 1903, she became chair of the local suffragist branch of the National Association for Women's Suffrage until she left Umeå for the Swedish capital about a year later. In Stockholm, she began working at the public school training seminary as a teacher and librarian. In 1918, she was one of the first women in Sweden to be appointed as lecturer at a higher learning institute, a position she occupied until her retirement in 1924.

During her Stockholm years, Eurén was also active in the peace movement and the inclusion of pacifist thinking in school teaching, as well as ecumenical religious movements. She died in 1939 and is buried in Solna.

== Biography ==
=== Personal life ===
Elisabet Eurén was born in Bergsgården, Stora Kopparberg parish in the Dalarna region in 1864. Her parents were the main district judge of Falu judicial district, Justus Ludvig Eurén (1806–1885), and his wife, Elisabeth Christina Eurén (née Södermark; 1829–1904). She had a younger brother, Ludvig Magnus Eurén (1866–1936), who later served as mayor of Eksjö and as an auditor in the Småland hussar regiment. Eurén never married or had any children, similar to many other working women at the time. She died on 20 August 1939 at the age of 75 as a result of hepatic cirrhosis and cystopyelitis, an inflammation of the urinary tracts and kidneys, at the Red Cross hospital in Norra Djurgården, Stockholm, and was buried beside her parents on the Northern Cemetery (Norra begravningsplatsen) in Solna.

=== Pedagogical training ===
Following her basic school education, Eurén studied at the Royal Advanced Female Teaching Seminary (Kungliga högre lärarinneseminariet) in Stockholm, from which she graduated in 1884. To continue her education and her knowledge of foreign languages she undertook frequent travels abroad that brought her to Hanover and Switzerland in 1889 and to England in 1891. In later years she would also travel to Norway (1898), Germany, Italy and Tyrol (1907), Denmark (1907 and 1917) and France (1921).

Back in Sweden, Eurén began working as a teacher in Stockholm, first at the Royal Normal School for Girls (Statens normalskola för flickor) 1885–1887 and at Brummerska skolan 1885–1886, and later also at the Girls‘ High School (Lyceum för flickor) 1887–1892. In 1893 she pursued further pedagogical education and graduated a second time from the Royal Advanced Female Teaching Seminary. She then moved to Umeå, her mother's birthplace, where she was appointed as a teacher at Umeå public school training seminary (folkskoleseminarium).

=== Reform pedagogy ===
At the Umeå seminary Elisabet Eurén was the only female teacher at the time, her main subjects being Swedish, pedagogical methodology and later also Christian theology. She also became known and appreciated for her advocacy of new teaching methods that focused on practical matters and self-improvement. To this aim, the well-read Eurén initiated the establishment of a school library and introduced a more practical training outfit for gymnastics classes. Interested in women's rights matters, she also made it her habit to teach in the so-called reform dress (reformdräkt), a more healthy and comfortable women's outfit inspired by the Victorian dress reform movement. Although the dress itself did not become very popular in Sweden, its proponents had considerable success in the increased abolition of corsets at Swedish girl schools from the 1890s onward.

Apart from contacts to the Swedish Dress Reform Association and other proponents of women's rights, Elisabet Eurén was also socially engaged. It was her initiative that led to the establishment of a workhouse for the poor in 1897, which was not only the first in the city of Umeå but the Västerbotten county as well. The workhouse was financed by the Lars Hierta Memorial Foundation (Lars Hierta minnesfond) and since 1901 managed by a foundation, of which Eurén became the first secretary until she moved to Stockholm three years later. For a short time she also held the position of chair for the local suffragist association that was founded in Umeå in 1903.

=== Involvement in peace activism, ecumenism and social reform ===
Following the death of her mother in 1904, who had spent the last years of her life in her daughter's apartment in Umeå, Elisabet Eurén moved back to Stockholm and continued working as a teacher for Swedish, nature studies, pedagogy and methodology at the public school training seminary in Maria Prästgårdsgata in the district of Södermalm.

Building on her success in Umeå, she again advocated for the setup of a school library of which she eventually became the librarian. Together with her colleague Marie Louise Gagner, among others, she also advocated for well-written and affordable literature for young people while being very critical of the so-called colportage literature: books and story papers that were peddled in the rural districts of Sweden and had a reputation for being superficial, lurid and sensationalist.

Eurén continued her reformatory work in the pedagogical field and together with like-minded female colleagues became a strong proponent for structural changes in public education. She joined the board of the Swedish Association of Seminary Teachers (Svenska seminarielärareföreningen) in 1906 and became its deputy chair from 1913 to 1918. When a legislative change in 1918 made it possible for women to work as lecturers in higher education, Elisabet Eurén was promoted to the position of lecturer at the Stockholm training seminary for the subjects of psychology, pedagogy and Swedish. This made her one of the first female lecturers at an advanced teaching institution, which at the time was also one of the highest public offices open to women in Sweden. That same year Eurén even became substitute principal for the school, but gave up this post already in 1920. She retired as a teacher and lecturer in 1924 at the age of 60.

During this later period Eurén increasingly began to turn to the Christian faith and related community and social reform programs. She joined the Association for Christian Community Life (Förbundet för kristet samhällsliv) after its establishment in 1917, through which she came into contact with the association's president, the theologian, school headmaster and social reformist Natanael Beskow, as well as the activist writer Ebba Pauli. Back in 1912 they had founded Birkagården, the first of Sweden's so-called ‘settlement’ houses (hemgård) that served as contact points between the urban poor and middle-class volunteers and provided services such as education, daycare for children or medical assistance, even this with a strong Christian orientation.

Eurén strongly supported the ecumenical and social educational work at Birkagården, something that was also highlighted in the obituary published in Svenska Dagbladet upon her death in 1939. Described as deeply devotional, she also established close contacts with the Swedish Quakers, the Society of Friends (Vännernas samfund) during the 1930s and was the only woman to be appointed to the Swedish Ecumenical Agency (Svenska ekumeniska nämnden) in 1933.

Elisabet Eurén also became involved with the Swedish peace movement, in particular the advocacy of peace education in public schools. Through Matilda Widegren, even she a teacher and graduate from Stockholm Royal Advanced Female Teaching Seminary, as well as a leading figure of the Swedish peace movement, Eurén was introduced to other female teachers concerned with teaching school pupils about issues related to peace and democratic values, with the aim of "promoting the creation of the ethical and social spirit, which must form the necessary basis for the relationship between peoples" ("att främja skapandet av den etiska och sociala anda, som måste bilda den nödvändiga grundvalen för förhållandet mellan folken").

The movement gained most traction during and after the First World War with the Swedish Schools’ Peace Association (Svenska skolornas fredsförening) that was active from 1919 to 1956. Elisabet Eurén alternately became the association's chair and deputy chair and also played a leading role in the sister organization Nordic Teachers' Peace Federation (Nordiska lärarens fredsförbund) up until 1936.

=== Tributes ===
Upon her death, the associations she had been a member of or was otherwise affiliated with showed their respect through speeches or by sending wreaths and flowers for her cremation and burial at Norra begravningsplatsen in Solna. Among the speakers were school principal Anna Sörensen as representative of the Folkskoleseminariet and the Swedish Association of Seminary Teachers, principal N.J. Nordström of the Association for Christian Community Life, and teacher Greta Stendahl of the Nordic Teachers’ Peace Association. With no surviving immediate family, Eurén's inheritance went to the Public Inheritance Fund (Allmänna arvsfonden).

== Written works (selection) ==
- Några bilder från kväkarnas internationella arbete under och efter världskriget [Some Images from the Quakers’ International Work during and after the World War]. EOS: Uppsatser och meddelanden utgivna av Svenska skolornas fredsförening, Stockholm: Oskar Eklunds bokförlag 1927a, pp. 64–73.
- Översikt av det internationella fredsarbetet under året 1926 [Overview of the International Peace Work during the Year 1926]. EOS: Uppsatser och meddelanden utgivna av Svenska skolornas fredsförening, Stockholm: Oskar Eklunds bokförlag 1927b.
- Från de nordiska skolornas fredsföreningars möte i Roskilde [From the Meeting of the Nordic Schools’ Peace Associations in Roskilde]. Skola och samhälle, 1925 (6:2), pp. 51–59.
- Den internationella Folkhögskolan vid Helsingör. Nya vägar [The International Folk High School in Elsinore. New Roads]. Illustrerad tidskrift, 1923(1):20, pp. 153–155.
- Vägen until den första kvinnliga fullmaktstjänsten [The Road to the First Female Civil Servant Position]. Hertha, 1917(4):12, pp. 226–232.
