= Ellen Palmstierna =

Swedish activist

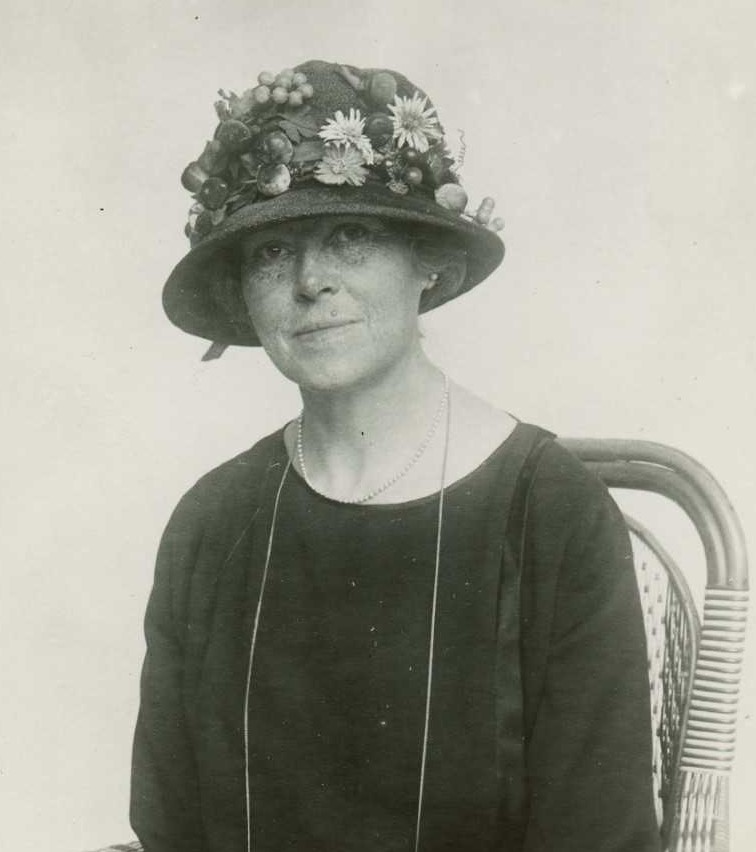
Ellen Palmstierna

Eleonora Wilhelmina Palmstierna, generally known as Ellen Palmstierna, (1869–1941) was a Swedish activist. She was active in the women's suffrage and peace movements. In 1915, she was one of the Swedish delegates at the International Congress of Women held in The Hague, after which she travelled to St Petersburg for discussions and met the Russian foreign minister. She was one of the founders of the Internationella Kvinnokommittén för varaktig fred which became the Swedish branch of the Women's International League for Peace and Freedom. In 1919, Palmstiera founded and subsequently chaired Rädda Barnen, the Swedish chapter of Save the Children, also collaborating at the international level.

== Early life ==
Born in Stockholm on 7 April 1869, Eleonora Wilhelmina Palmstierna was the daughter of the nobleman Hjalmar Palmstierna and his wife Sofia Charlotta Wilhelmina née Blomstedt. She was one of the family's five children. In 1896, she married Baron Fabian Lilliecreutz and moved with him to Jönköping. The marriage was dissolved in 1911.

== Career ==
After her divorce in 1911, Palmstierna moved back to Stockholm where she was active as secretary of the Swedish Association for Women's Suffrage (LKPR). She also worked as a librarian for the social welfare association Centralförbundet för Socialt Arbete.

As a result of her contacts with Elin Wägner, Palmstierna became actively involved in the peace movement. In 1915, she was one of the Swedish delegates at the 1915 Women's Peace Congress in The Hague. After the congress, she served as secretary of the Swedish women's peace organization, later known as the Swedish branch of the Women's International League for Peace and Freedom. After the congress in The Hague, she travelled to St Petersburg with Jane Addams and Emily Greene Balch, presenting the outcome of the congress and entering into discussions with the foreign minister Sergey Sazonov.

In 1919, Palmstiera was one of the founders of Rädda Barnen, the Swedish chapter of Save the Children. Serving as chair of the Swedish organization, she also collaborated at the international level, travelling to Berlin, Vienna and Budapest to monitor the need for assistance. She reported on her findings in the Swedish journal Rädda Barnen and her 1920 book Några intryck av nöden i Österrike och Ungern (Impressions of Requirements in Austria and Hungary). She served the Swedish organization until 1932. For her services, she was awarded the Illis quorum medal.

Ellen Palmstierna died on 2 December 1941 in Stockholm and was buried in Solna's Norra begravningsplatsen.

== See also ==
- List of peace activists
