= Wilhelmina Skogh =

Swedish hotel manager

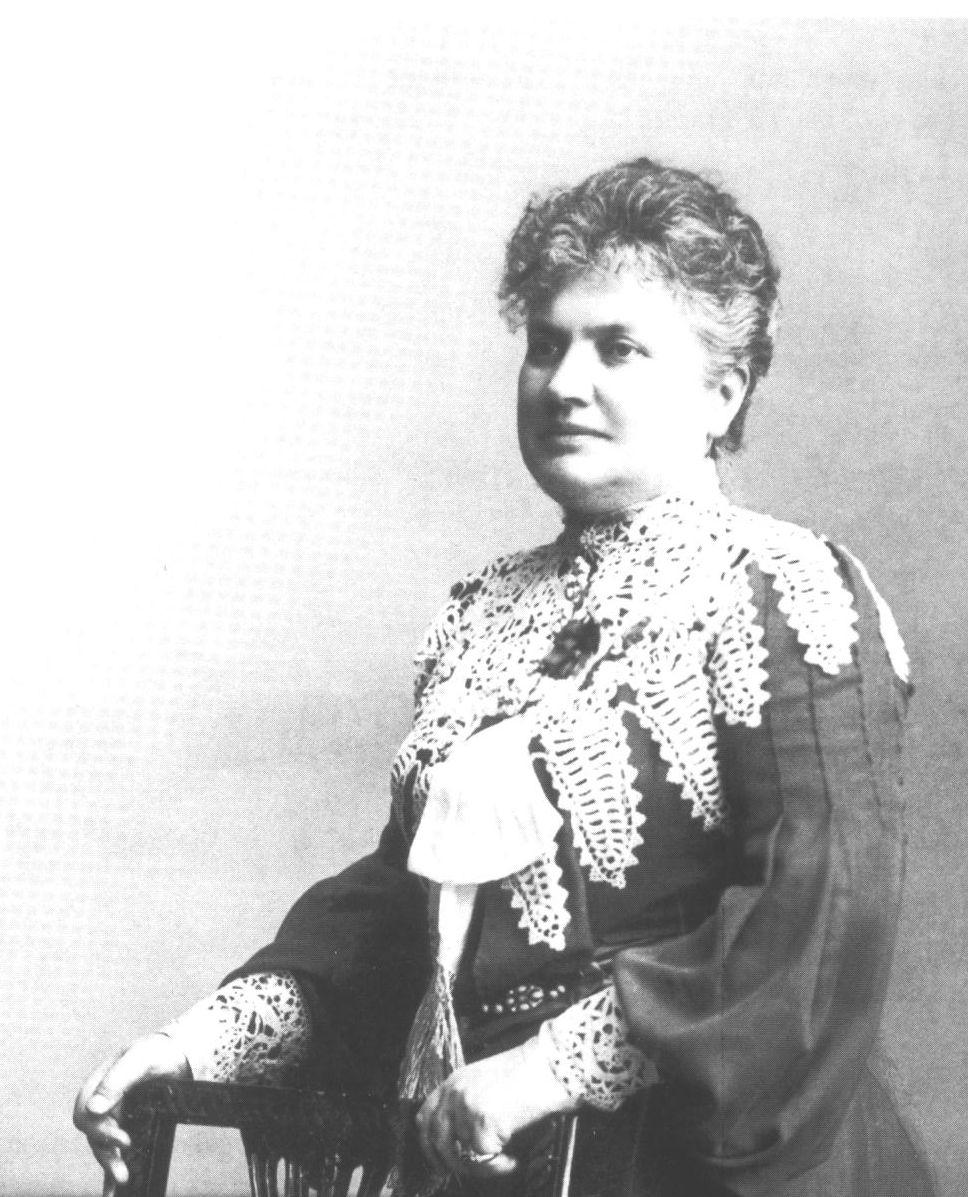
- Photo from around 1902
- Born: Lorentina Wilhelmina Wahlgren; 14 December 1849; Rute, Gotland, Sweden
- Died: 18 June 1926 (aged 76); Stockholm, Sweden
- Resting place: Norra begravningsplatsen
- Occupation(s): Businesswomen, hotel manager
- Spouse: Per Samuel Skogh (m. 1888; died 1904)
- Children: 1

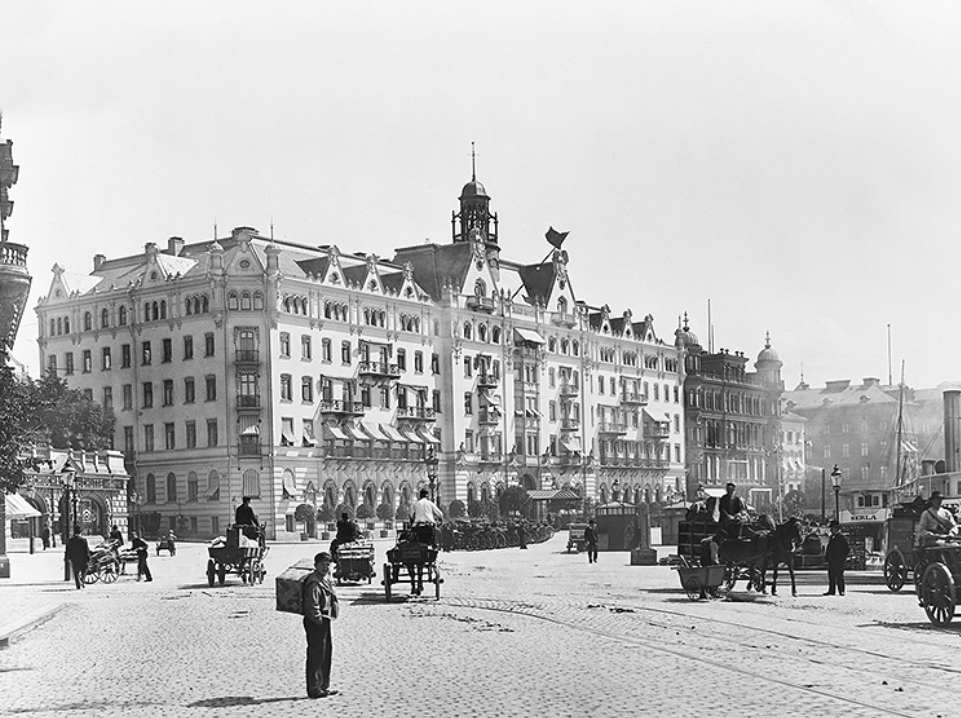
Grand Hôtel, Stockholm, photo from 1901, one year before Wilhelmina Skogh was appointed general manager for the hotel.

Lorentina Wilhelmina Skogh (née Wahlgren; 14 December 1849 – 18 June 1926) was a Swedish hotel manager and owned a number of hotels and restaurants in Sweden.

In 1888, she married wine trader Per Samuel Skogh (1849–1904). She had one son, Gustav Wahlgren, to an unknown father. He was adopted by a family in Bollnäs that Wilhelmina knew well and changed his last name to Skogh at the age of 15.

== The early years ==
She came alone to Stockholm from the island Fårö (north part of Gotland) by steam ship at the age of 14 with the intention to get a job and earn some money to support her family on Gotland. Her father died when Wilhelmina was 6 years old and the family became rather poor. She became very impressed by the lifestyle in the 'big city', the fine restaurants and hotels and soon she decided to look for a job in a restaurant to learn the business. Her first job was drying the dishes from early morning to late evening in the restaurant at 'Strömparterren' down below the bridge 'Norrbro', close to the Royal Castle. When she became older she studied in an evening school as well as working, learning languages and book-keeping. From an early age she had the very strong ambition that some day she would have her own company in the hotel and restaurant business.

== Entrepreneur ==
She built her first hotel at the age of 27 – the railroad hotel in Storvik (outside the town of Sandviken) by the railroad station, and established the Wilhelmina Wahlgren AB company. In 1884 she bought the railroad hotel in Bollnäs, where she spent many years of her life and married Pehr Skogh. She was also appointed the manager for a number of other hotels as she soon got a reputation to rapidly increase the business with new marketing ideas in both the hotel and restaurang business, for instance increasing the use of vegetables in order to cut down on the expensive meat, and introduced new ideas in the tourist business by working together with the London-based Thomas Cook travel agency in order to be able to offer luxury accommodations combined with hunting and fishing in Sweden for rich British visitors. She built private telephone lines connecting her hotels before the telephone system was introduced on a larger scale in Sweden, and installed central heating (steam-heating systems) and electricity with steam-engine driven electric generators in her hotels.

== The Grand Lady ==
Wilhelmina became managing director of Grand Hôtel in Stockholm in 1902 at the age of 53. Her most famous project was to build the Grand Hôtel Royal including the immense Winter Garden in the form of an "annex" to the original hotel building. She got the idea for Royal during her first trip to Paris. (Grand Hôtel Royal was the venue for the Nobel Banquet for many years, and was moved eventually to the Stockholm City Hall, where it is held in December each year). The Winter Garden has a ceiling height of 15 m (49 ft) and can accommodate 800 dinner guests. It remains even today an important cornerstone of what the Hotel can offer.

Her husband Per Skogh died in 1904 and she then arranged a large headstone including a large angel in marble, still present in front of the family grave in Stockholm.

She left Grand Hôtel in December 1910 following a disagreement with members of the board about economy.

== Villa Foresta ==
Between 1908 and 1910, when she still was working at Grand Hôtel in Stockholm, she built her private house – the "Villa Foresta" (Foresta is the Italian word for her last name 'Skog', in English Forest) on the island of Lidingö east of Stockholm. The house is situated on the 'Herserud' cliff, next to the property of Milles Art museum, with a view of the waters and the city of Stockholm, reminding her of the view across Fårösund on Gotland where she grew up. In order to get the right feeling of "Gotland" she used limestone from Gotland as building material. (See the lower part of the building). At that time Villa Foresta was the largest private residence on Lidingö. She lived there until 1922 when the costs for the big house finally forced her to sell the entire building to pay the loans and move out. A company was formed that took over the whole property. Villa Foresta today is owned by a real estate company and rented out to the Swedish-based hotel chain Scandic Hotels.

== Last years ==
She spent the last four years of her life in a small private flat in "Bolinders Palace", a building adjacent to the Grand Hôtel and part of the hotel complex. The free disposition of an apartment at the Hotel including free meals was actually a part of the deal when she left the position as managing director for Grand Hôtel in 1910. When she moved out from Foresta she was almost bankrupt and she had to ask for economic support from old friends in the last years of her life.

Wilhelmina died in the early morning of 18 June 1926.

Wilhelmina Skogh was awarded the Order of Vasa in 1896 and H.M. The King's Medal in 1909.

== Gallery ==
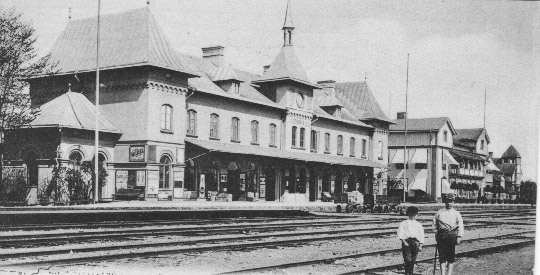
Storvik railroad station and the hotel to the far right. Postcard, around 1880.

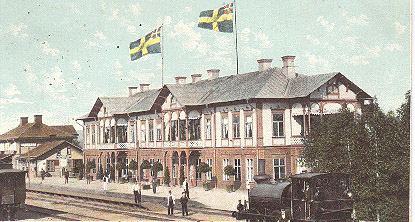
Bollnäs railroad hotel & station. Postcard, around 1880.

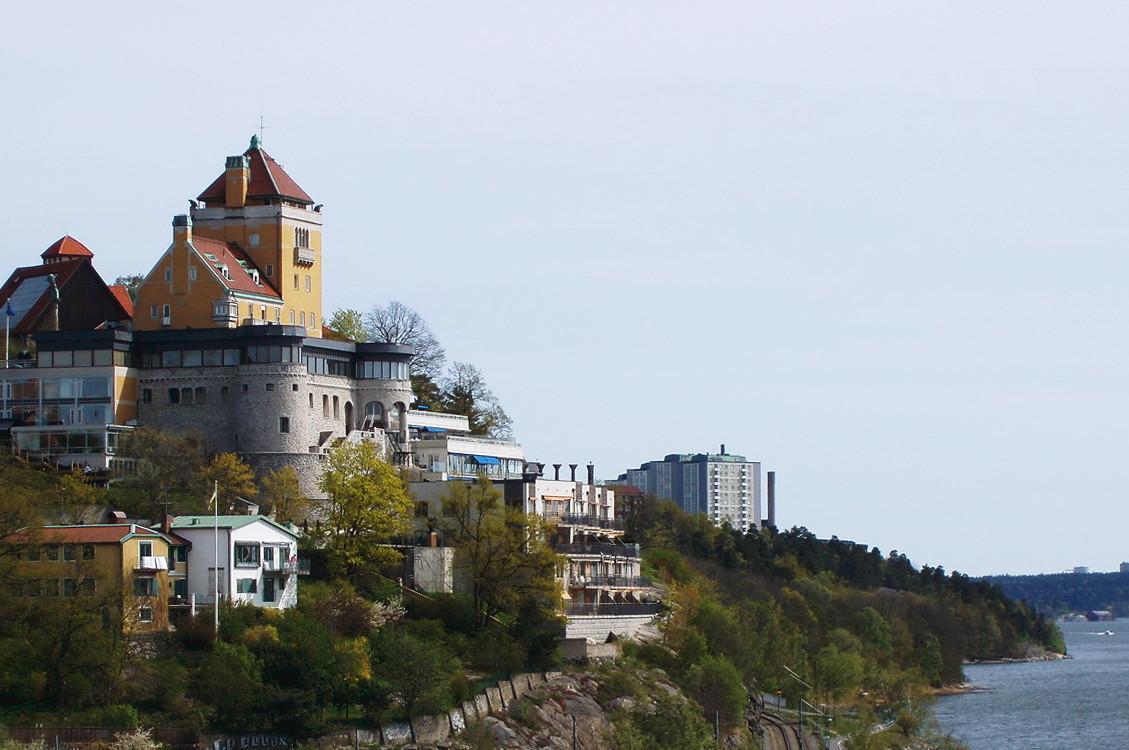
Villa Foresta on the cliff of Herserud, Lidingö.

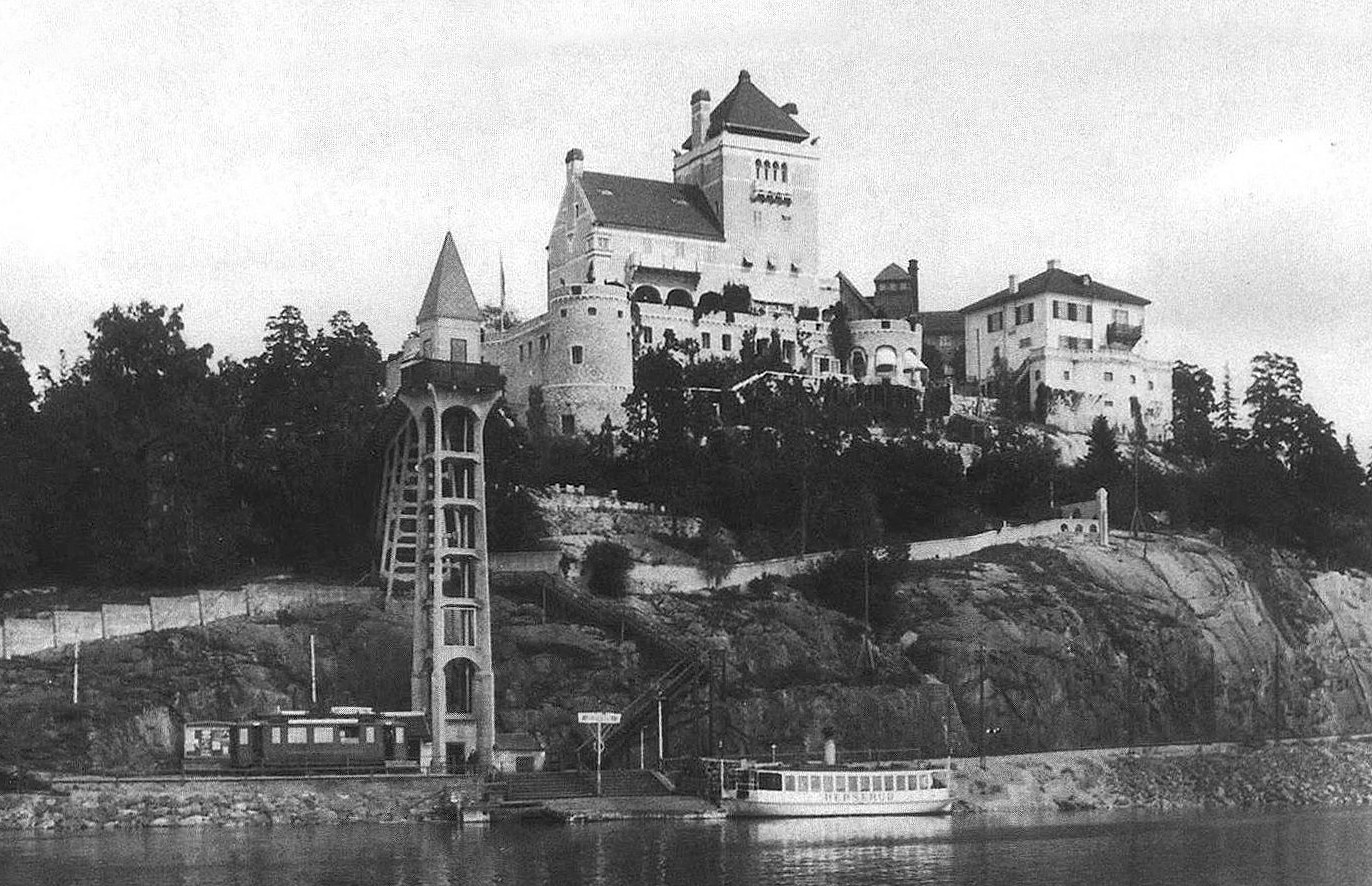
Villa Foresta with the electric driven elevator up to Herserud. Photo: 1915.

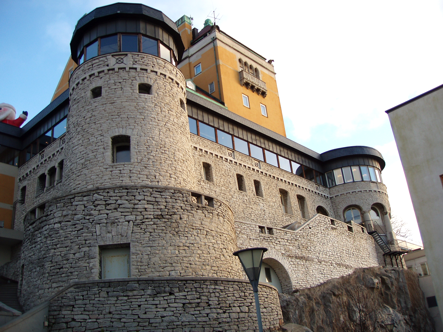
The original lower part of Foresta inspired by the old feudal castles, common in the Rehn-Valley in south of Germany.

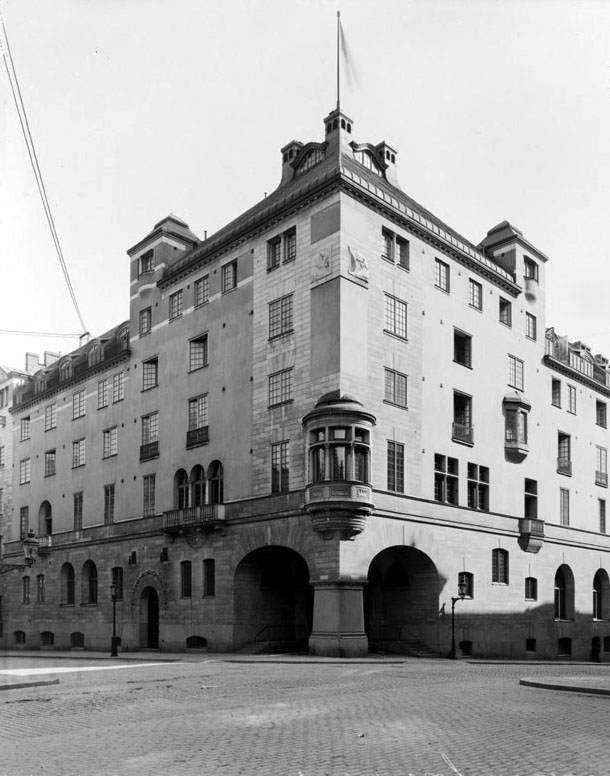
Grand Hôtel Royal, entrance on the backside of Grand Hôtel. Photo: 1909.

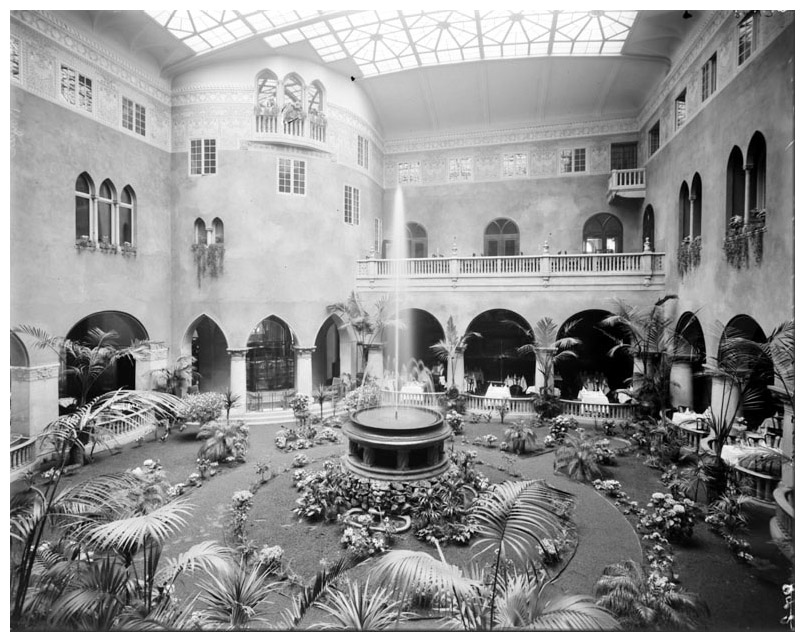
Grand Hôtel Royal, interior. Photo: 1909.

== See also ==
- Sofia Gumaelius
