= Karin Fjällbäck-Holmgren =

Swedish politician (1881–1963)

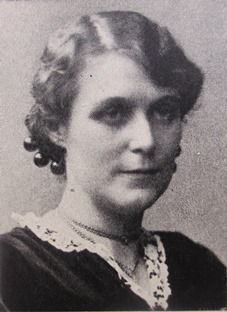
Karin Fjällbäck-Holmgren (1924)

Katarina (Karin) Helena Fjällbäck-Holmgren (1881–1963) was a Swedish politician who was active in the areas of social welfare and women's suffrage. She served as secretary and deputy chair of the Stockholm branch of the National Association for Women's Suffrage (LKPR). Politically liberal, she was active on several of the Liberal Party's committees and from 1919 participated enthusiastically in municipal council meetings. She served on Stockholm's public school directorate in the 1920s and from 1931 chaired the city's welfare agency for children.

== Biography ==
Born in Stockholm on 31 July 1881, Katarina Helena Fjällbäck was the daughter of the industrialist Johan Alfred Fjällbäck (1855–1933) and his wife Anna Carolina née Carlsson (1855–1943). She was the younger of two sisters. After receiving her school-leaving certificate when she was 18, she was a student at the College of Stockholm and Uppsala University.

In 1903, Fjällbäck began her professional life as a member of the board of the newly established CSA or Centralförbundet för Socialt Arbete, an organization designed to coordinate associations working on social welfare, primarily to offset poverty resulting from industrialization. In 1906, she married the zoologist Nils Frithiof Holmgren (1877–1954) with whom she had two daughters, Kaj (1907) and Pia (1909).

Raising a family did not prevent Fjällbäck-Holmgren from developing her career. From around 1910, she was first secretary, then deputy chair of the Stockholm branch of the National Women's Suffrage Association. She served on the board of the liberal women's association (Föreningen frisinnade kvinnor) and was a board member of Stockholm's liberal constituency, serving on its executive committee. She was also on the board of the Fredrika Bremer Association which supported women's rights.

On the political front, following the municipal suffrage reforms, from 1919 she participated actively in city council meetings, attracting an Idun commentator to write that she "had already managed to make herself known as an unusually accomplished and astute speaker".

She was awarded the Illis quorum for her work.

Karin Fjällbäck-Holmgren died in Stockholm on 22 April 1963 and was buried in Solna's Norra begravningsplatsen.
