= Alice Nordin =

Swedish sculptor (1871–1948)

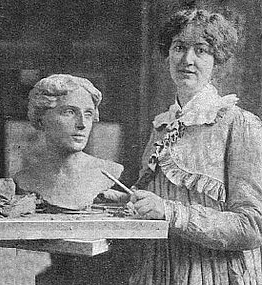
- Nordin in 1903
- Born: 4 May 1871; Stockholm, Sweden
- Died: 26 May 1948 (aged 77); Stockholm, Sweden
- Burial place: Norra begravningsplatsen 59.35977°N 18.02621°E
- Education: Royal Swedish Academy of Fine Arts; Académie Colarossi
- Occupation: Sculptor
- Employer: Gustavsberg porcelain
- Spouse: Andreas Lindblom
- Relatives: Hjördis Nordin-Tengbom (sister)
- Awards: Litteris et Artibus (1926)

Alice Nordin (4 May 1871 – 26 May 1948) was a Swedish sculptor.

After leaving the Royal Swedish Academy of Fine Arts, Nordin studied in Paris before traveling around Europe. Stories of her travels were published in Idun magazine.

In 1911, Nordin became the first female sculptor to have an exhibition at Konstnärshuset. In 1926, she received the Swedish Royal medal Litteris et Artibus. Her work was part of the sculpture event in the art competition at the 1932 Summer Olympics.

== Gallery ==
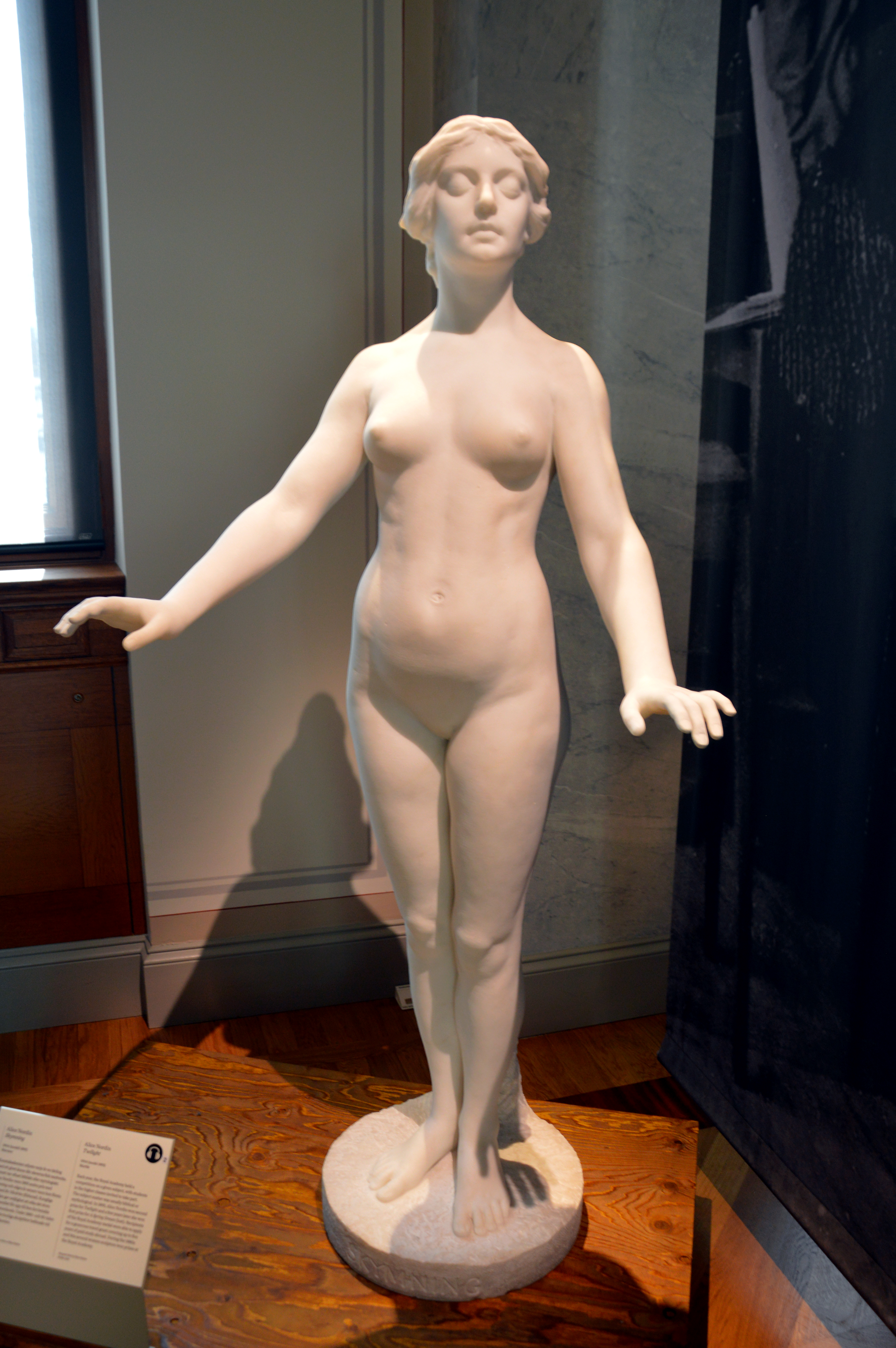
Twilight (1895).

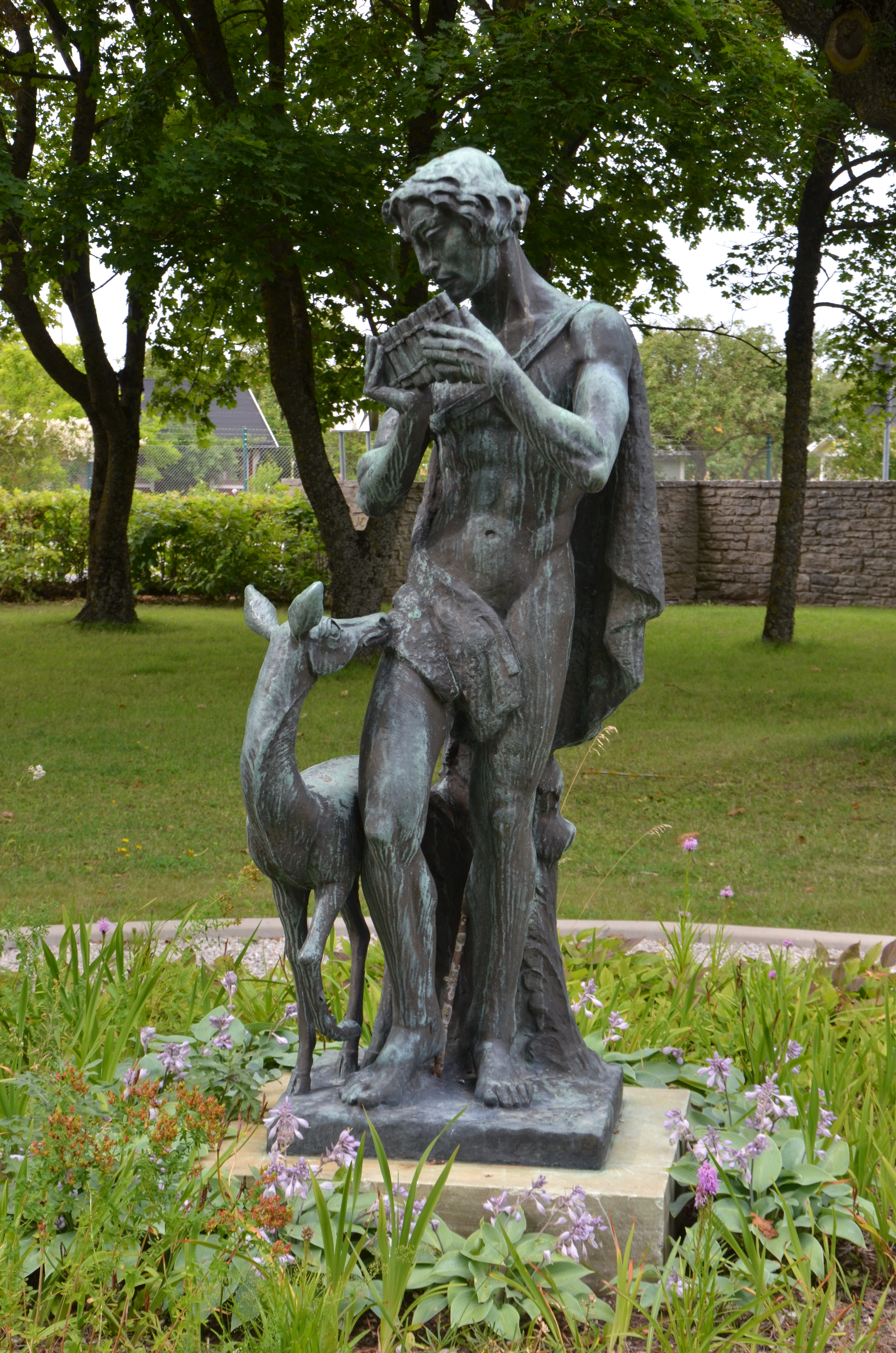
Shepherd with a hind (1937).

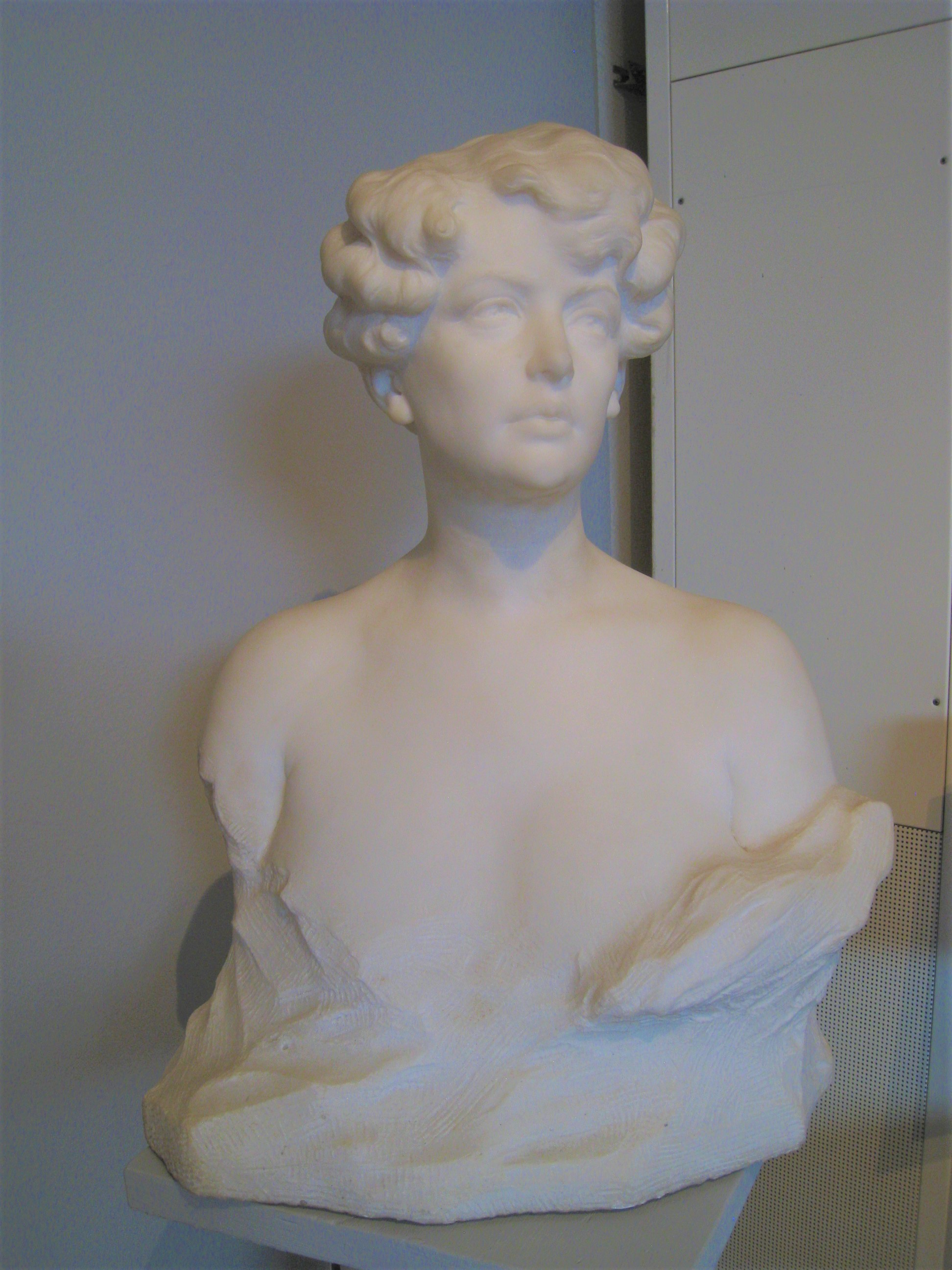
Bust of Märtha Cederström (1910).

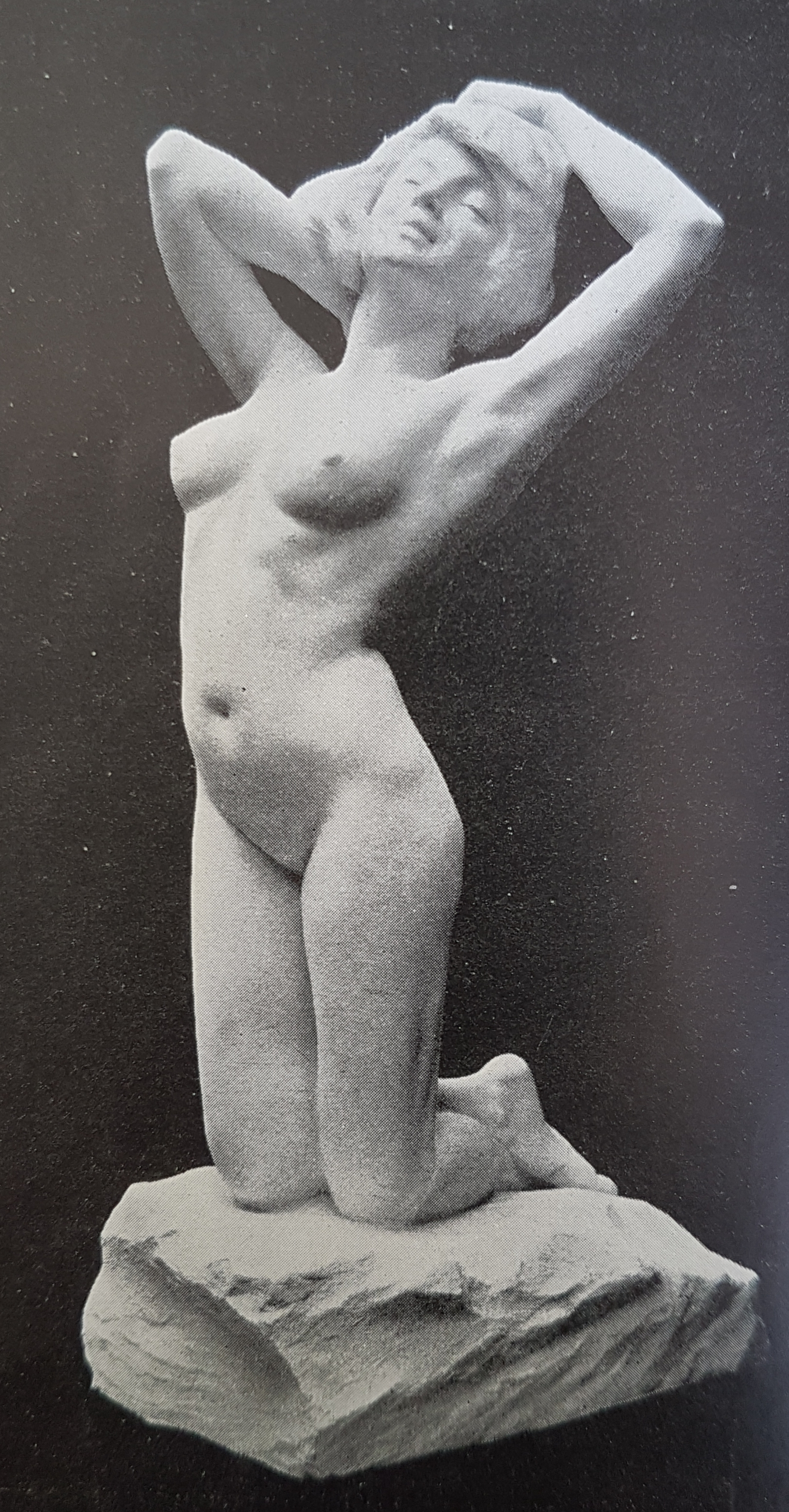
Hymn to nature.

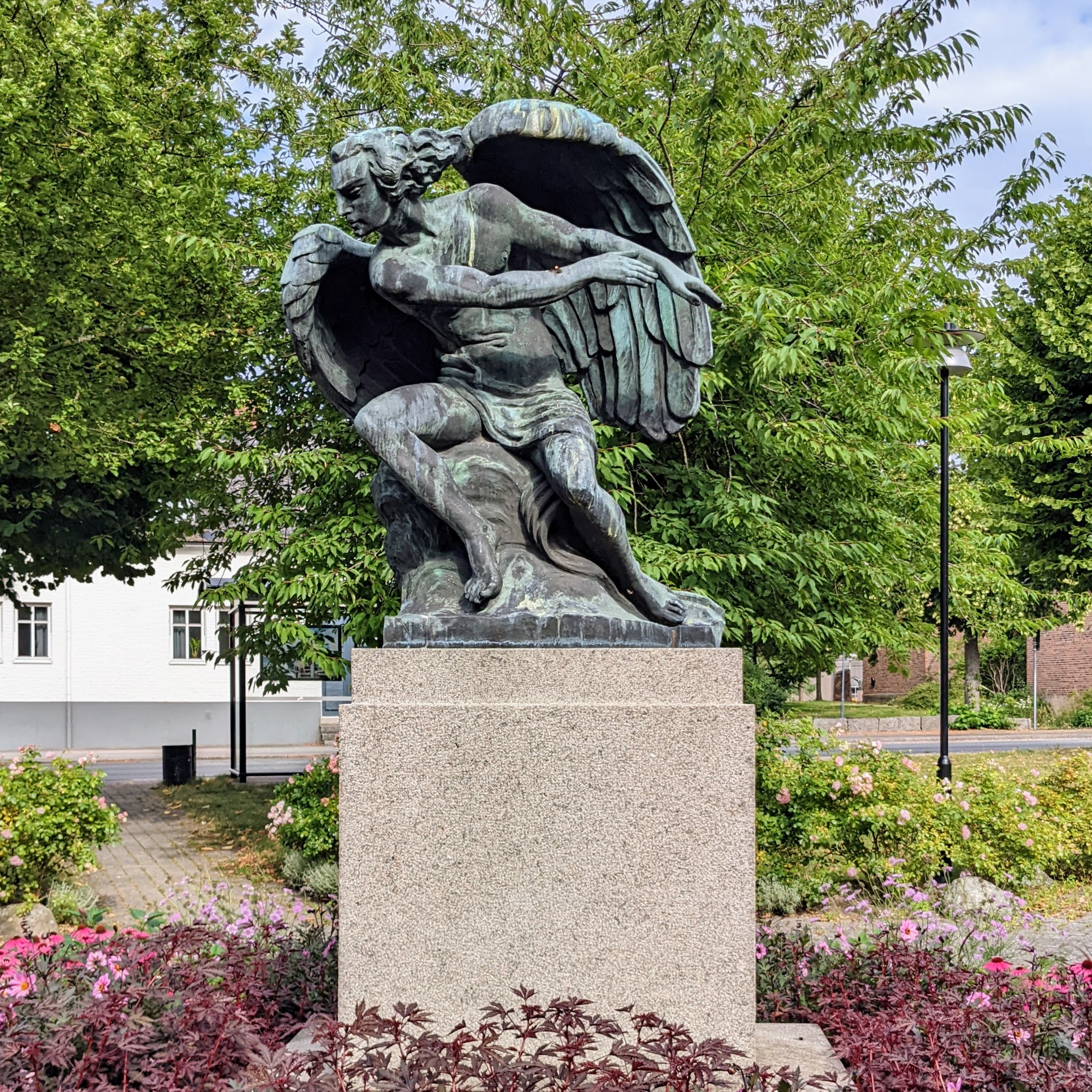
Ariel (1926)
