= Emerik Stenberg =

Swedish painter (1873–1927)

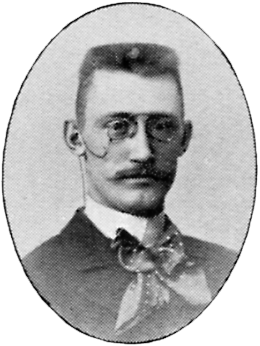
- Emerik Stenberg, from the Swedish Portrait gallery XX (1901)
- Born: Isak Johan Emerik Gustaf Stenberg; 7 January 1873; Stockholm, Sweden
- Died: 31 July 1927 (aged 54); Stockholm, Sweden
- Occupation(s): Draftsman, painter, folklorist
- Spouse: Gully Elisabeth Hård (m. 1905)

Isak Johan Emerik Gustaf Stenberg (7 January 1873 – 31 July 1927) was a Swedish draftsman, painter and folklorist.

== Biography ==
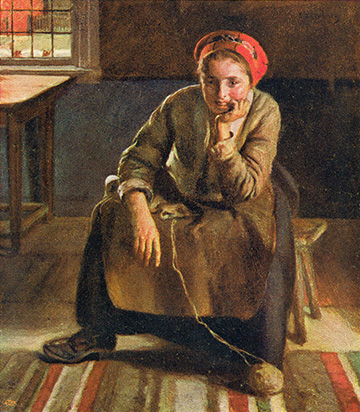
Björs-Mia (1911)

Stenberg was born in Stockholm in 1873. His father, Gustaf, was a Commissioner in the Swedish National Audit Office. He studied art at the Royal Swedish Academy of Fine Arts from 1891 to 1896 while also taking lessons at the Konstnärsförbundets skola ('Artists' Association School'). What would become a major factor in his later career was a visit he made to Dalarna in 1894. He was captivated by the folk culture there and settled in the village of Ullvi, near Leksand, in 1897; decorating his farm with locally made furniture and craft objects. A painting he produced at that time (Wake in Leksand) was successfully shown at the General Art and Industrial Exposition of Stockholm. This was followed by several lengthy study trips to France, Germany and the Low Countries from 1898 to 1901.

He married Gully Elisabeth Hård in 1905. They had three sons and one daughter.

Numerous showings followed, including those at the Norrköping Exhibition of Art and Industry (1906), the Lund Exhibition (1907), the Baltic Exhibition (1914) and an exhibition at the Royal Academy of Arts in London (1924).

In 1906, he became a member of the Royal Swedish Academy. He was named a deputy professor in 1908 and a full professor the year after. Opposition to the Academy's traditional teaching methods eventually led him to resign. For many years following that, he was a successful portrait painter.

In 1927, Stenberg died in Stockholm. He is buried at the Norra begravningsplatsen there. In 1932, the Royal Swedish Academy held a major retrospective. His portraits may be seen at the Academy, the Nordic Museum, the National Archives of Sweden, the Gothenburg Museum of Art, the Nationalmuseum and several others.

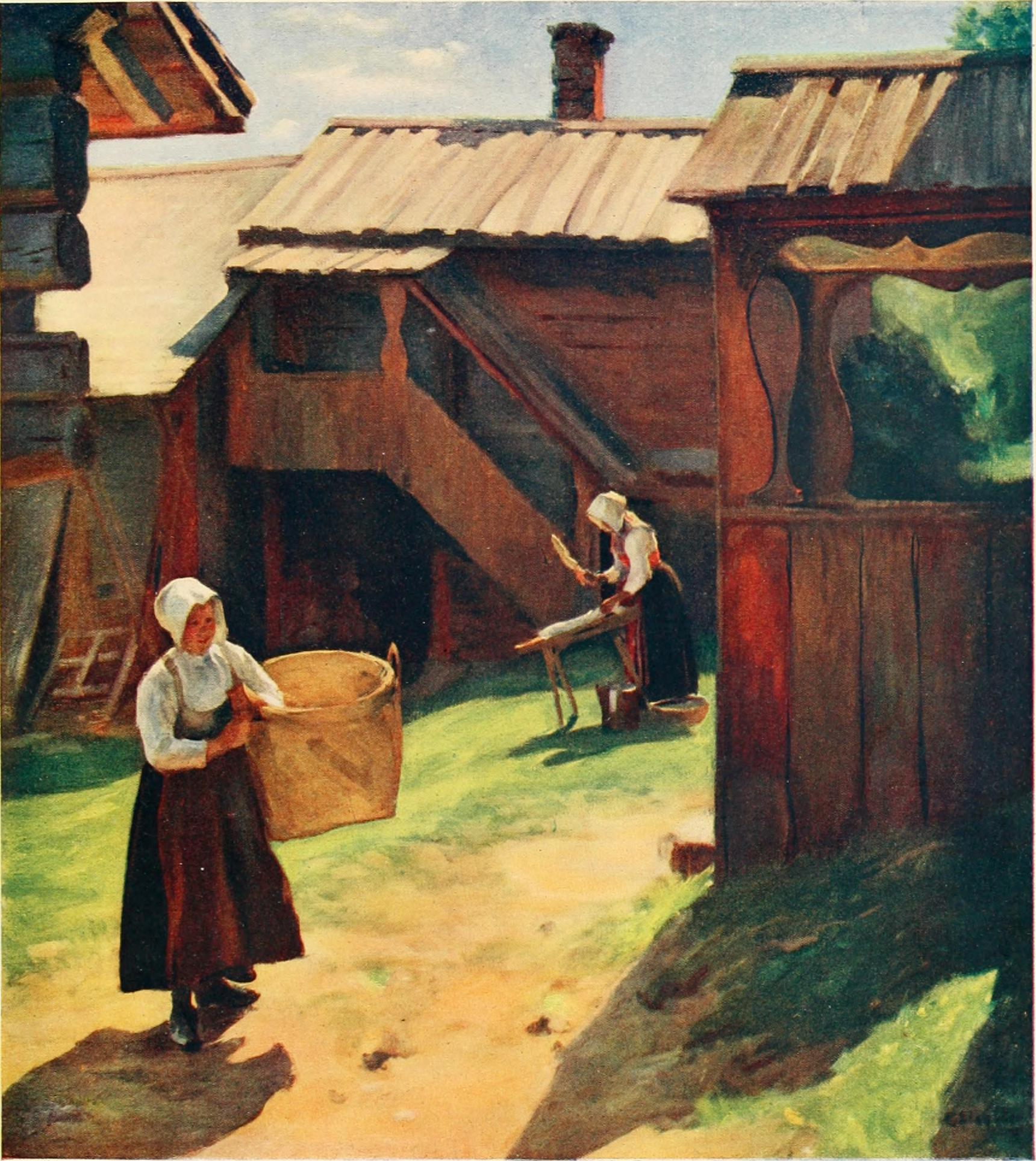
Exterior of a Peasants' Cottage (1910)
