= Norra begravningsplatsen =

Cemetery in Solna, Stockholm County, Sweden

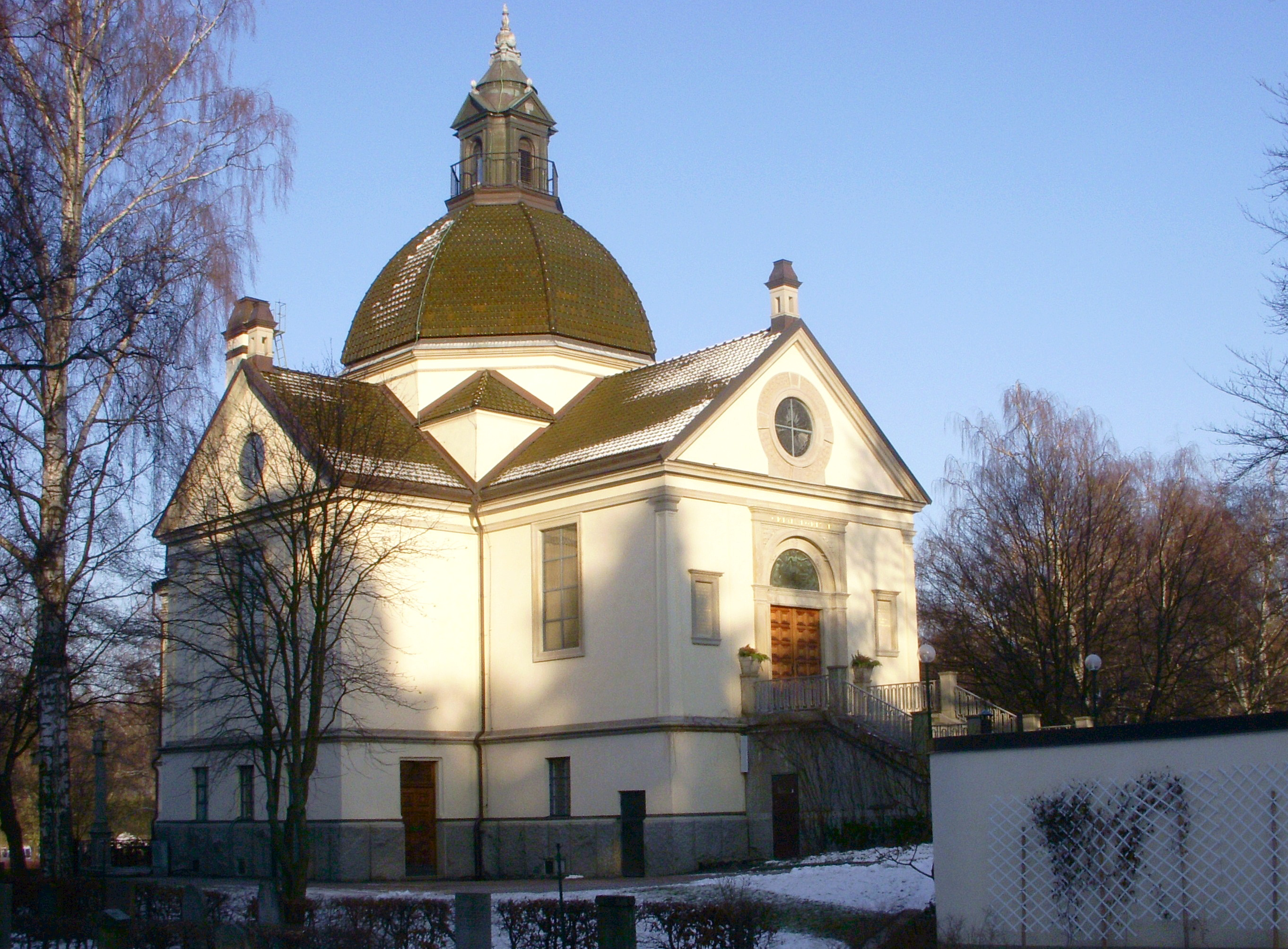
- Northern Chapel at Norra begravningsplatsen
- Interactive map of Norra begravningsplatsen

Details
- Established: 9 June 1827
- Location: Solna
- Country: Sweden
- Coordinates: 59°21′24″N 18°1′9″E
- Size: 62 hectare
- No. of graves: 33,000

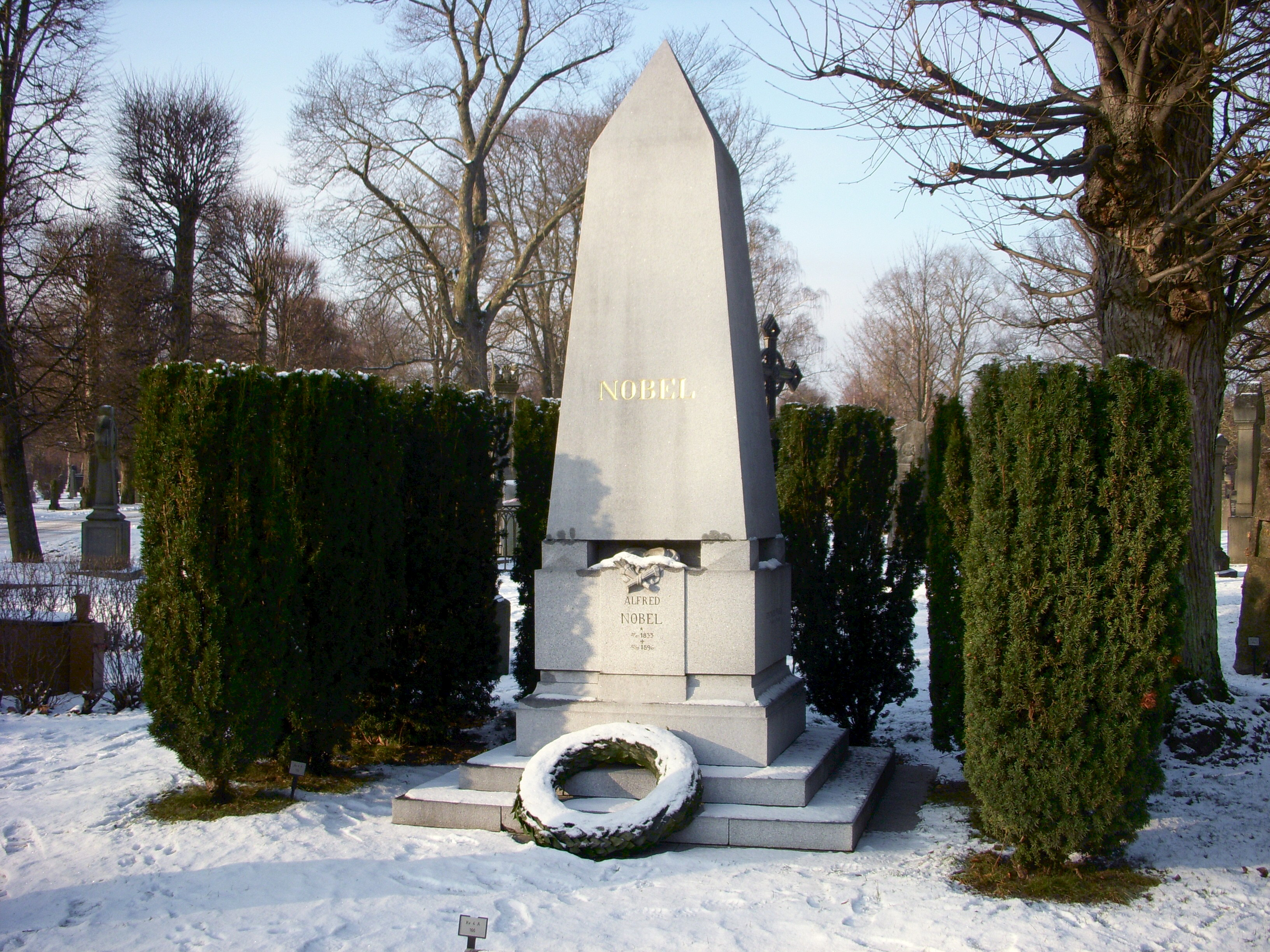
Tomb of Alfred Nobel

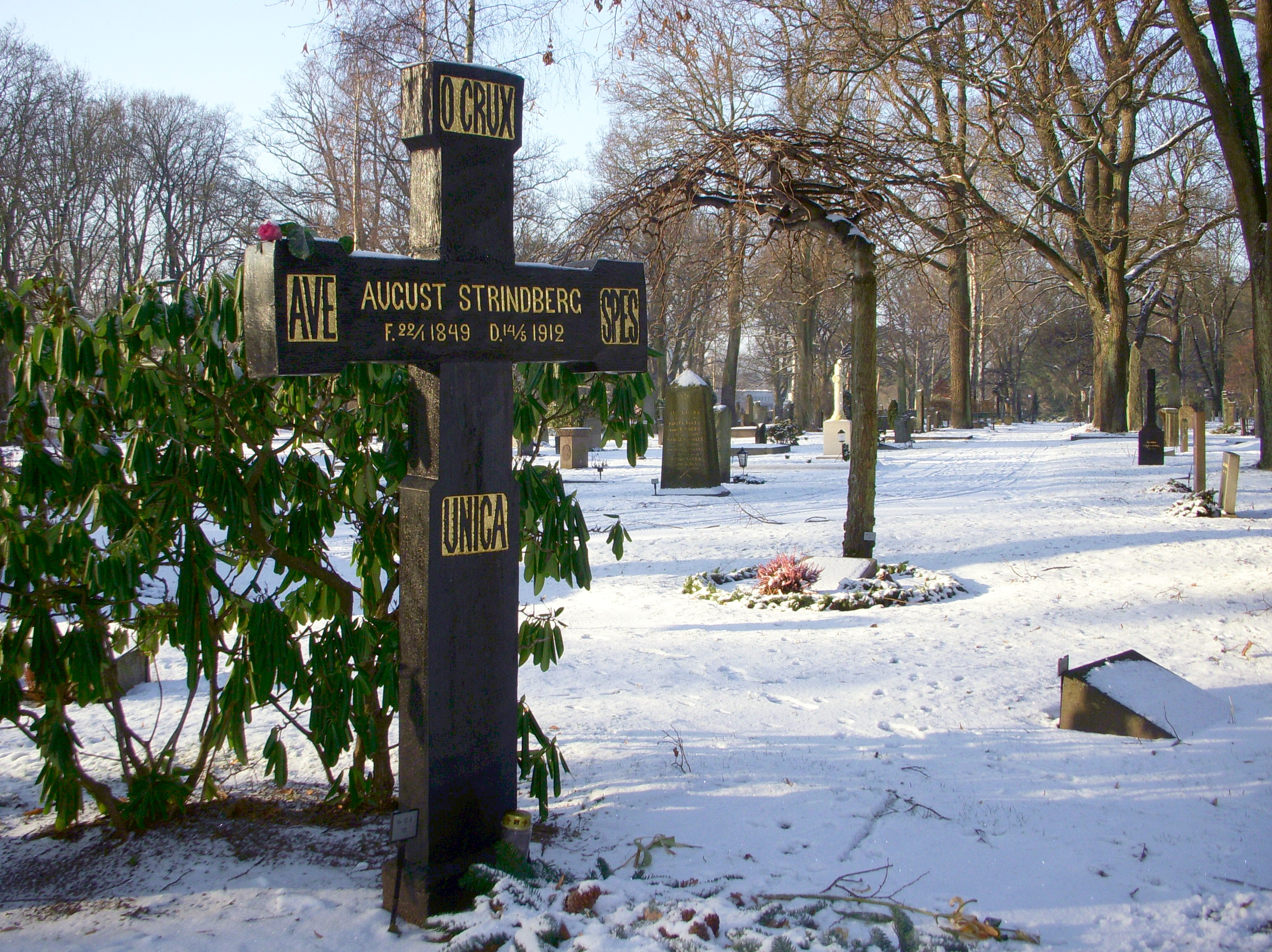
Grave of August Strindberg

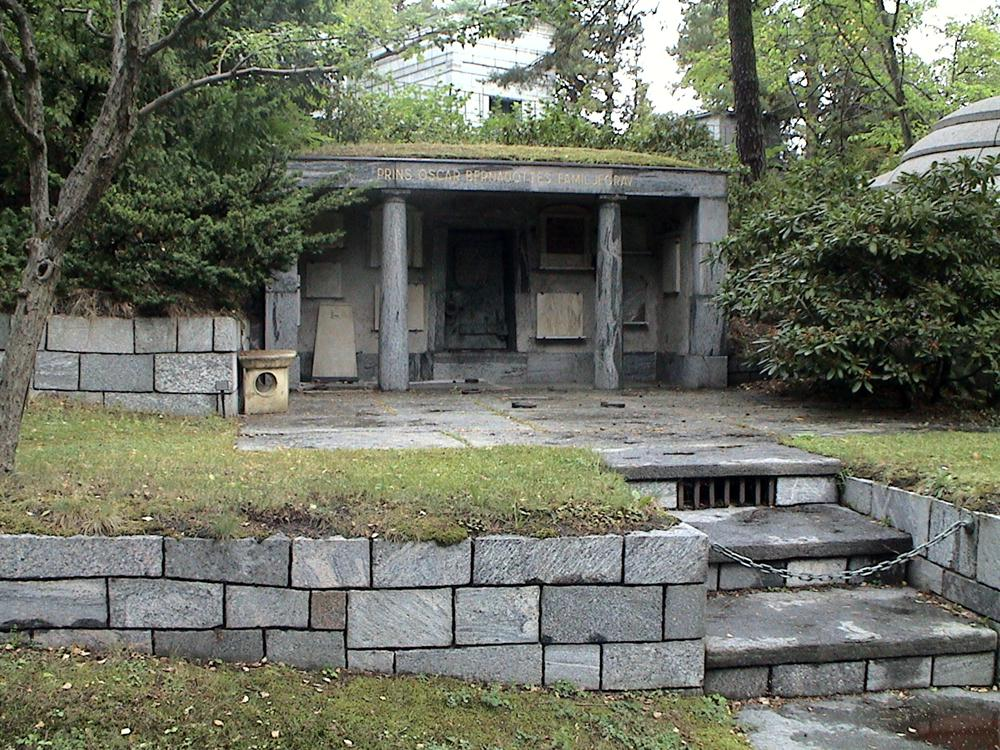
Prince Oscar Bernadotte's family tomb, where Folke Bernadotte is also interred

Norra begravningsplatsen, literally "The Northern Burial Place" in Swedish, is a major cemetery of the Stockholm urban area, located in Solna Municipality. Inaugurated on 9 June 1827, it is the burial site for a number of Swedish notables.

The largest part of the cemetery is managed by Stockholm municipality, despite being located in the neighbouring municipality of Solna. The site also has a Catholic and a Jewish burial ground with their own administrators. The Catholic burial ground was established in 1847 to the north of the oldest part of the cemetery and next to the Catholic part is the Jewish burial ground, which was established in 1857. The Catholic and Jewish burial grounds also have chapels.

== Notable interments ==
=== Nobel laureates ===
- Klas Pontus Arnoldson (1844–1916), Nobel laureate in Peace
- Allvar Gullstrand (1862–1930), Nobel laureate in Medicine
- Nelly Sachs (1891–1970), author and Nobel laureate in Literature
- Hugo Theorell (1903–1982), Nobel laureate in Medicine

=== Political figures and diplomats ===
- Per Albin Hansson (1885–1946), Prime Minister of Sweden
- Arvid Lindman (1862–1936), Prime Minister of Sweden
- Karl Staaff (1860–1915), Prime Minister of Sweden
- Folke Bernadotte (1895–1948), diplomat
- August Blanche (1811–1868), writer, publicist and politician

=== Explorers and adventurers ===
- Salomon August Andrée (1854–1897), polar explorer
- Knut Frænkel (1870–1897), engineer and Arctic explorer
- Nils Strindberg (1872–1897), photographer and Arctic explorer

=== Writers and literary figures ===
- August Strindberg (1849–1912), author and playwright
- Vilhelm Moberg (1898–1973), author
- Bo Bergman (1869–1967), author, poet, and lyricist
- Catharina Rosaura "Rosa" Carlén (1836–1883), author
- Richard Dybeck (1811–1877), jurist and lyricist of the Swedish national anthem
- Waldemar Hammenhög (1902–1972), writer and novelist

=== Actors, actresses, and film directors ===
- Ingrid Bergman (1915–1982), actress
- Gunnar Björnstrand (1909–1989), actor
- Gösta Ekman (senior) (1890–1938), actor
- Hasse Ekman (1915–2004), actor, director and writer
- Karin Molander (1889–1978), actress
- Mauritz Stiller (1883–1928), film director and actor
- Victor Sjöström (Victor Seastrom) (1879–1960), international film director
- Inga Tidblad (1901–1975), actress
- Justus Hagman (1859–1936), actor

=== Musicians, composers, and entertainers ===
- Franz Berwald (1796–1868), classical composer
- Kurt Atterberg (1887–1974), composer
- Ulf Björlin (1933–1993), conductor and composer
- Ernst Rolf (1891–1932), entertainer and theatrical producer
- Ulla Billquist (1907–1946), singer
- Anna Norrie (1860–1957), operetta singer

=== Visual artists and sculptors ===
- Isaac Grünewald (1889–1946), painter
- Barbro Östlihn (1930–1995), painter
- Jenny Nyström (1854–1946), artist and illustrator
- Alice Nordin (1871–1948), sculptor
- Barbro Bäckström (1939–1990), sculptor
- Fanny Hjelm (1858–1944), portraitist and miniaturist
- Emerik Stenberg (1873–1927), painter

=== Industrialists and inventors ===
- Ivar Kreuger (1880–1932), industrialist and financier
- Alfred Nobel (1833–1896), inventor and founder of the Nobel Prize

=== Architects and engineers ===
- Isak Gustaf Clason (1856–1930), architect
- Gustaf Dahl (1835–1927), architect
- Samuel Owen (1774–1854), engineer, inventor, and industrialist
- Gustaf de Laval (1845–1932), engineer and inventor

=== Scientists and mathematicians ===
- Jöns Jacob Berzelius, (1779–1848), chemist
- Arne Beurling (1905–1986), mathematician
- Augusta Christie-Linde (1870–1953), zoologist
- Oskar Klein, (1894–1977), physicist
- Sofya Kovalevskaya (1850–1891), mathematician and writer
- Oscar Montelius (1843-1921), archaeologist
- Signe Salén (1871–1963), physician
- Axel Key (1850–1891), pathologist

=== Advocates for social and women's rights ===
- Elisabet Eurén (1864–1939), educator and activist
- Karin Fjällbäck-Holmgren (1881–1963), suffragist and activist
- Ellen Palmstierna (1869–1941), activist

=== Military and nobility ===
- Charles de Champs (1873–1959), vice-admiral of the Swedish Navy
- Estelle Bernadotte née Manville (1904–1984), American–Swedish countess
- Alice Habsburg (1889–1985), member of the Polish Home Army

=== Athletes ===
- Ulrich Salchow (1877–1949), world and Olympic figure skating champion
- Janken Wiel-Hansen (1868–1938), Norwegian-Swedish athlete, pioneer in fencing and swordsmanship.

=== Business figures ===
- Wilhelmina Skogh (1849–1926), businesswoman and hotel manager
