= Barbro Bäckström =

Swedish sculptor

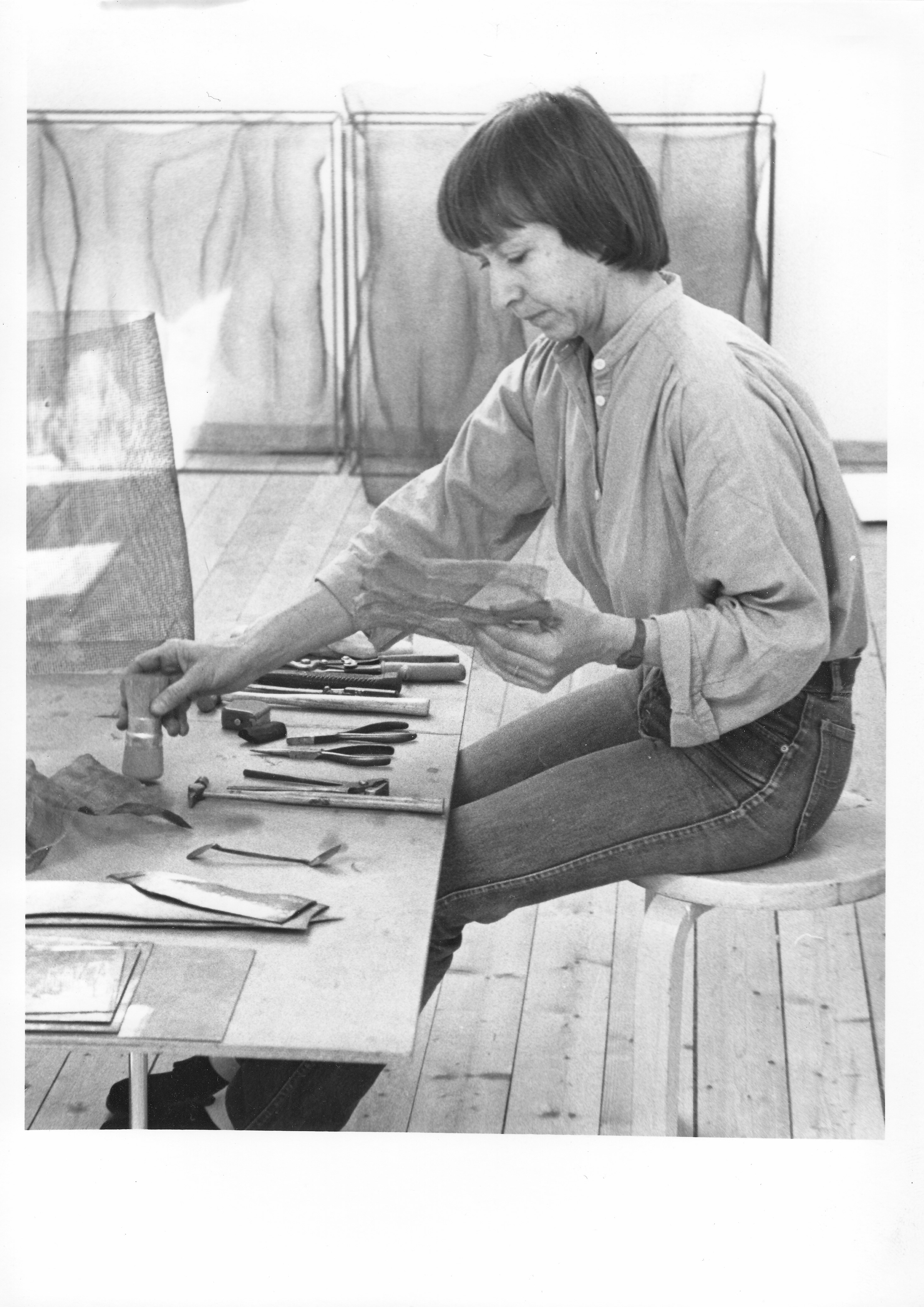
Barbro Bächström in her studio (1982)

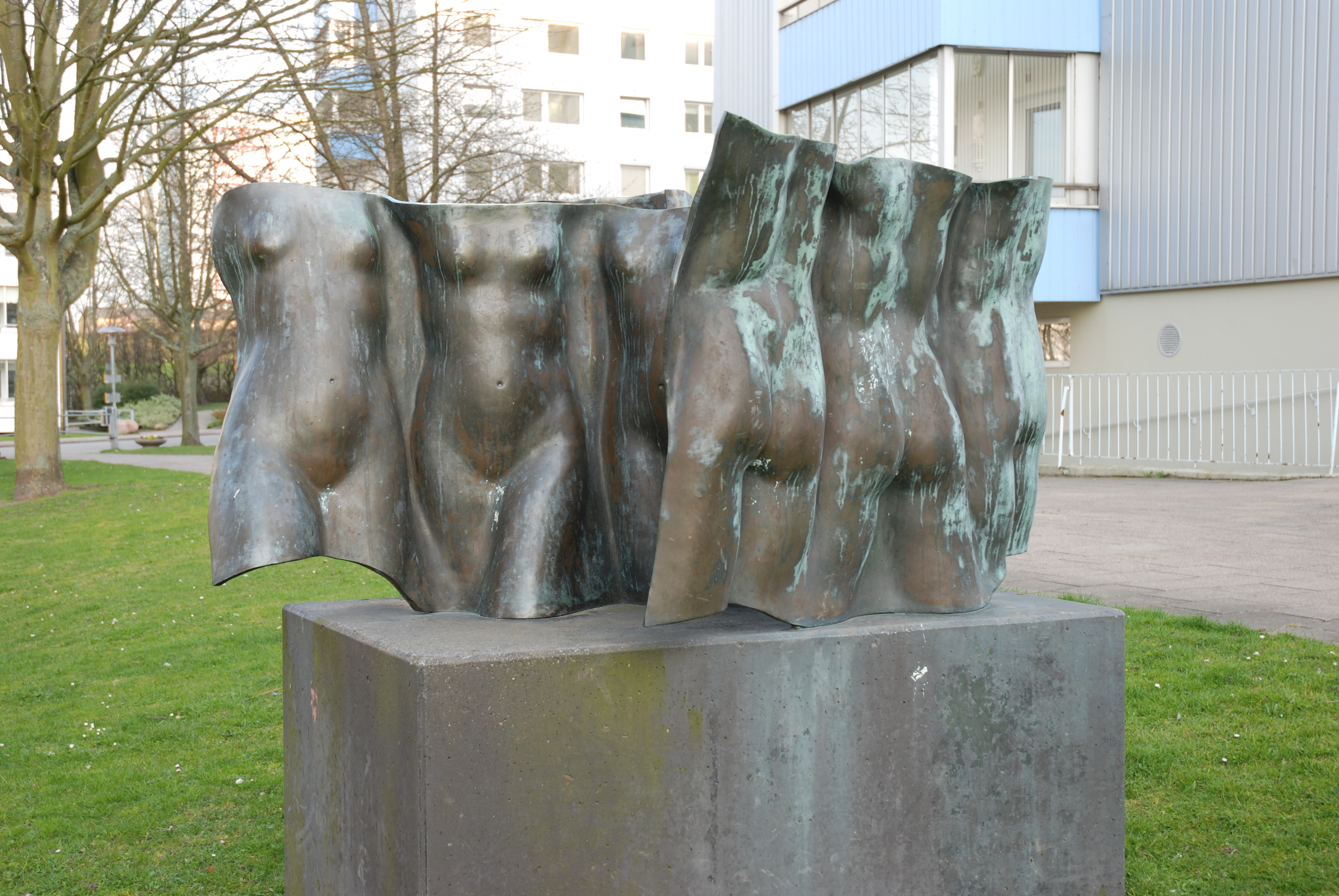
Bächström's I rena gladjen (In Pure Joy) in Malmö

Barbro Agneta Bäckström née Erhardsson (6 December 1939 – 8 February 1990) was a Swedish sculptor who is remembered for her depictions of fragments of the human body, frequently in the form of undulating cloth-like statues or as reliefs of nude women. Her larger outdoor works are in bronze or iron while those displayed indoors are generally reliefs in wire mesh. Many of her works have been exhibited at the Malmö Art Museum.

== Biography ==
Born in Stockholm on 6 December 1939, Barbro Agneta Erhardsson was the daughter of Arvid Julius Erhardsson and his wife Birgit. She was raised on the island of Vindö in Stockholm County. Encouraged by her parents, she developed her interest in art and attended the University College of Arts, Crafts and Design between 1960 and 1964 where she trained as a drawing teacher.

While studying, she met and married the sculptor Holger Bäckström (1939–1997). On completion of their studies the couple moved to Lund where Barbro held her first solo exhibition at the Galleri Atheneum in 1965. Thanks to a series of commissions, she created bronze sculptures depicting fragments of human bodies for public outdoor display while her iron works were housed indoors in schools and hospitals. She later created a multitude of smaller works depicting body parts such as stomachs, backs, wings and hands, made from materials ranging from aluminium to plastic and metals.

Barbro Bäckström died in Lund from cancer on 8 February 1990 and is buried in Norra Cemetery.
