= Augusta Christie-Linde =

Swedish zoologist (1870–1953)

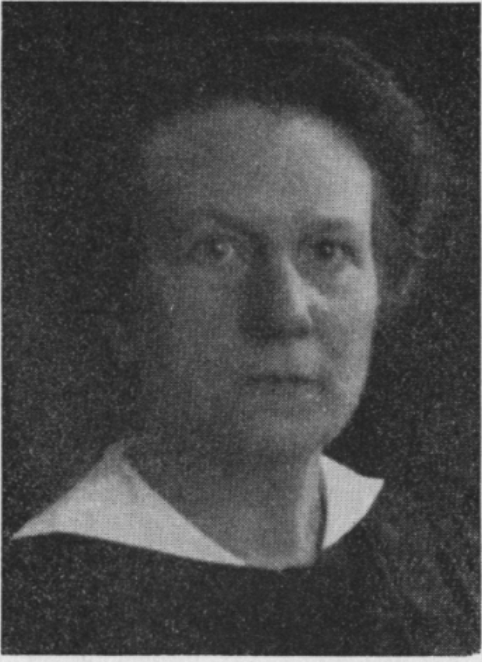
Augusta Maria Christie-Linde (1930)

Augusta Maria Christie-Linde (née Ärnbäck-Andersson; 1870–1953) was a Swedish zoologist, museum curator and educator. An active member of the zoological research community at Stockholm College from the early 1900s, she was the first woman to be appointed to a teaching position there and went on to earn a doctorate in 1908. She became a specialist in marine fauna, especially ascidians, and was recognized as one of the leading experts in the field. Her many scientific papers were published in German and English as well as in the Scandinavian languages. From 1916 to 1940, Christie-Linde established a close relationship with the invertebrate section of the Swedish Museum of Natural History where she spent short periods as curator.

== Early life, family and education ==
Born on her parents' farm near Vingåker, Södermanland County, Sweden, August Marie Ärnbäck-Andersson was the daughter of the farmer Anders Andersson and his wife Augusta née Larsson. In 1898, she married the lawyer Edvart Eilart Christie-Linde with whom she had a son, Anders Christie. After qualifying for her school-leaving certificante in Örebro in 1888, she studied at Uppsala University where she graduated in January 1892. She later studied at Stockholm College under Wilhelm Leche where she earned a doctorate in zoology in 1909.

== Career ==
Christie-Linde first taught in various Stockholm schools (1892–94). She then became an assistant lecturer in the zoological department at Stockholm College from 1896 to 1901. As the first woman to hold such a position, she attracted considerable attention including negative reactions from some of her male colleagues.

While undertaking her studies, from 1900 Christie-Linde published scientific papers under the name Ärnbåack-Christie-Linde, initially on the anatomy of mamels but soon on her increasing interest in marine life, in particular tunicates. As a result, she became recognized as one of the leading experts in Nordic, Arctic and Antarctic ascidians, not least those in Sweden.

From 1916 to 1940, Christie-Linde became attached to the Swedish Museum of Natural History, working from time to time in the museum's invertebrate section and occasionally acting as curator. The stipend she received in 1917 allowed her to travel abroad and establish international contacts.

Augusta Christie-Linde died on 20 September 1953 and was buried in the Northern cemetery in Solna.
