= Rosa Carlén =

Swedish novelist (1836–1883)

Catharina Rosaura Carlén
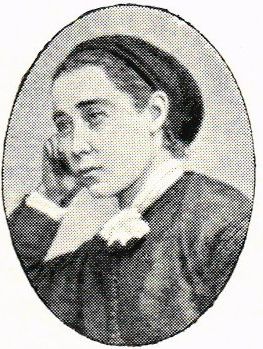
- Born: 9 May 1836; Dalsland, Sweden
- Died: 12 February 1883 (aged 46); Dals-Ed, Sweden
- Other name: Rosa Carlén
- Occupation: Writer
- Mother: Emilie Flygare-Carlén

Catharina Rosaura "Rosa" Carlén (9 May 1836 – 12 February 1883) was a Swedish novelist, best remembered for Agnes Tell: en äktenskaps-historia (1861), Tuva (1862), Brölloppet i Bränna: en brottmålshistoria (1863), and Helène: en qvinnas historia (1863).

== Life and work ==
Catharina Rosaura Carlén was born at Lerdalsstom in present Färgelanda Municipality, the child of the Swedish writer Emilie Flygare-Carlén (1807–1892) and the lawyer Jacob Reinhold Dalin (1799–1835), although her father died of gangrene before they had time to marry. Through her father, Rosa Carlén belonged to the Ingevald family. The father was described as "a highly idiosyncratic personality, brilliant, fiery, eccentric and melancholy," and came to have a decisive influence on his fiancée's writing and was the one who encouraged her to start writing. The year after Rosa Carlén's birth, she was adopted by her father's childless relatives, Jonas Bågenholm (1803–1864) and his wife Andriette Charlotta Ekelund (1808–1889), who lived on the farm Onsön in Dals-Ed.

Carlén's education in Åmål was financed by her mother and the two lived together in Stockholm during the years 1853–1855.

Rosa Carlén wrote several successful novels making her writing debut in 1861 with Agnes Tell. Thereafter, using the pseudonym "author of Agnes Tell," she published the novel Bröllopet i Bränna, which inspired a 1926 film directed by Erik A. Petschler.

Most of her books were favorably received and translated into Danish and German. However, her career was brief. In eleven years (1861–1873) she published eight books, seven novels and one collection of short stories.

== Personal life ==
In 1856, Rosa Carlén married the district governor, Swedish jurist and member of parliament, Richard Carlén (1821–1873). After her husband's death, Rosa Carlén stopped writing and returned to her home town in Dalsland, where she died in 1883. They are buried at the Norra begravningsplatsen outside Stockholm.
