= Emilie Flygare-Carlén =

Swedish novelist (1807–1892)

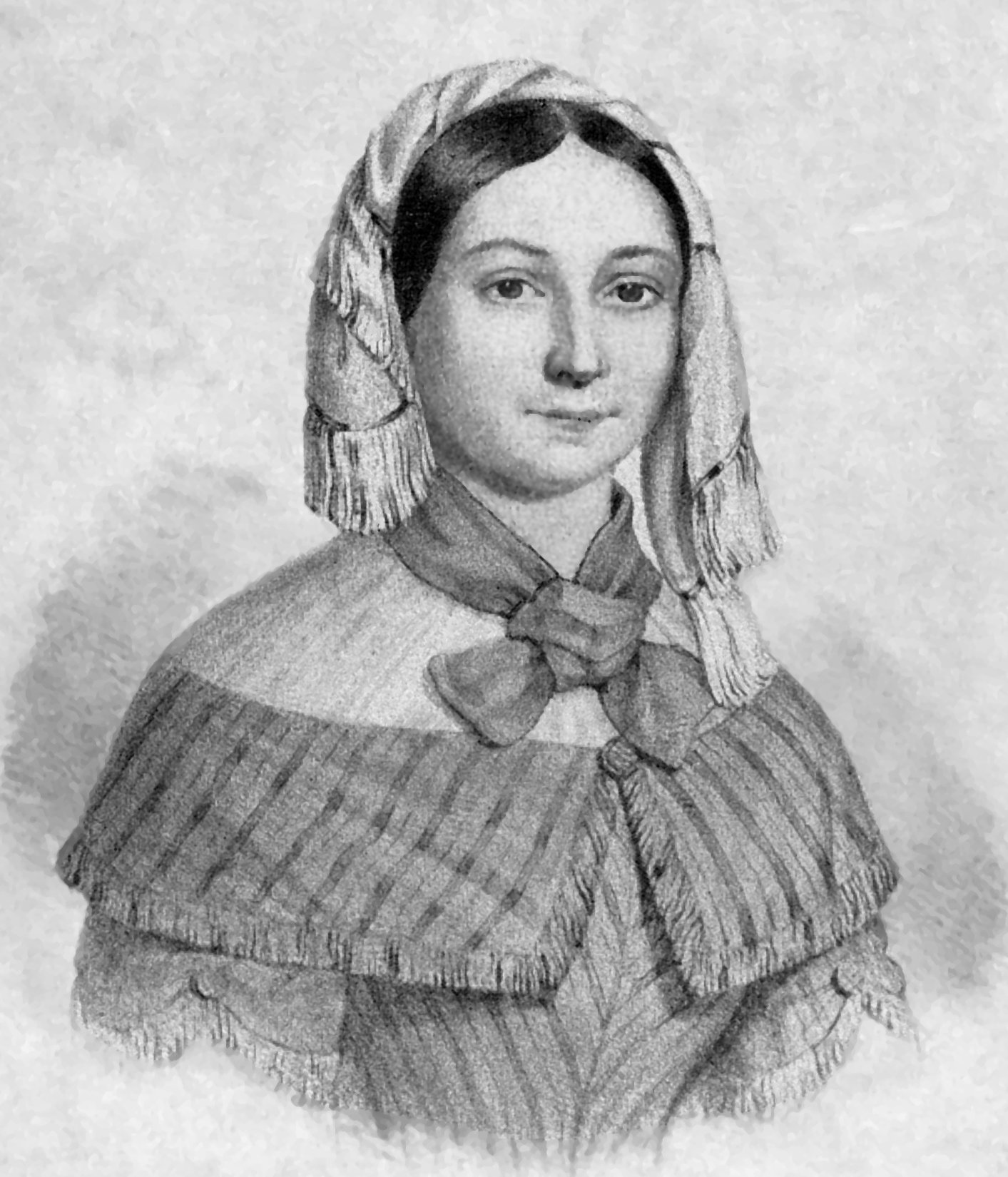
Emilie Flygare-Carlén

Emilie Flygare-Carlén (née Smith; August 8, 1807 – February 5, 1892) was a Swedish novelist.

== Biography ==
Emilie Smith was born in Strömstad and grew up in the archipelago of Bohuslän. Her father, Rutger Smith, was a retired sea captain who had settled down as a small merchant, and she often accompanied him on the voyages he made along the coast. She thus came in frequent contact with the seafaring folk, fishermen, and smugglers who were to populate her later stories. At the age of twenty, she married a local physician, Axel Flygare, and went with him to live in the province of Småland. She was widowed in 1833, returned to her old home, and decided to devote herself to literature.

She moved to Stockholm some years later, and in 1841 she married a lawyer, publicist and poet of that city, Johan Gabriel Carlén (1814–1875). Her house became a meeting place for Stockholm men of letters, and for the next twelve years she produced one or two novels annually. The premature death of her son Edvard Flygare (1829–1853), who had already published three books, showing great promise, was followed by six years of silence, after which she resumed her writing until 1884.

She founded charitable endowments in aid of students and of teachers, and of fishermen and their widows. She is best known by the hyphenated name Flygare-Carlén. She died in Stockholm. Her daughter, Rosa Carlén (1836–1883), was also a popular novelist.

== Publications ==
Her first novel, Valdemar Klein, was published in 1838. In that and several later novels, such as Rosen på Tistelön (1842; Eng. trans. The Rose of Tistelön, 1842), Pål Värning, Enslingen på Johannisskäret (1846; Eng. trans. The Hermit, 4 vols., 1853), Jungfrutornet, and Ett köpmanshus i skärgården (1859; The Merchant's House on the Cliffs), she wrote about life in the archipelago and the sea, while the stories of novels such as Fosterbröderna, Fideikommisset, Ett år, En nyckfull kvinna, Kamrer Lassman, and Vindskuporna take place in the middle or upper classes.

Her novels were collected into 31 volumes (Stockholm, 1869–1875). In 1878, she published an autobiography, Minnen af svenskt författarlif 1840–1860 (Reminiscences of Swedish Literary Life). She was translated into Danish, Norwegian, German, Russian, French, English, Italian, Portuguese, Dutch, Hungarian and Czech, and was the most widely read Swedish novelist of her time.

In 2007, Valancourt Books released a new scholarly English edition of The Magic Goblet (Kyrkoinvigningen i Hammarby, 1841), edited by Amy H. Sturgis.

== Bibliography ==
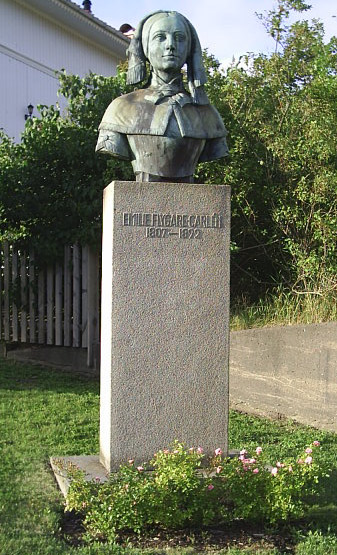
Bust of Emilie Flygare-Carlén in Strömstad

- Waldemar Klein (1838)
- Representanten (1839)
- Gustaf Lindorm (1839)
- Professorn och hans skyddslingar (1840)
- Fosterbröderna (1840)
- Kyrkoinvigningen i Hammarby (1841)
- Skjutsgossen (1841)
- Rosen på Tistelön. Berättelse från skärgården (1842)
- Kamrer Lassman (1842)
- Fideikommisset (1844)
- Pål Värning: En skärgårdsynglings äventyr (1844)
- Vindskuporna (1845)
- Bruden på Omberg (1845)
- Enslingen på Johannisskäret: Kustroman (1846)
- Ett år (1846)
- En natt vid Bullarsjön (1847)
- Jungfrutornet (The Maiden's Tower; 1848)
- En nyckfull kvinna (1848–49)
- Romanhjältinnan (1849)
- Familjen i dalen (1849)
- Ett rykte (1850)
- Förmyndaren (1851)
- Ett köpmanshus i skärgården (1860–61)
- Stockholmsscener bakom kulisserna (1864)
- Skuggspel (1865)
- Minnen av svenskt författarliv 1840–1860 (1878)
- Efterskörd (1888)
