= Fanny Hjelm =

Swedish artist and painter (1858–1944)

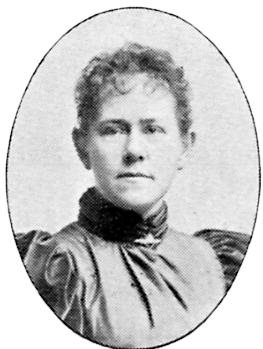
- Fanny Elisabeth Wilhelmina Hjelm in Svenskt Porträttgalleri XX
- Born: Fanny Elisabeth Wilhelmina Hjelm; 6 November 1858; Lindesberg, Sweden
- Died: 6 October 1944 (aged 85)
- Known for: Painter, portraitist, miniaturist

Fanny Elisabeth Wilhelmina Hjelm (6 November 1858 – 6 October 1944) was a Swedish visual artist.

== Early life and education ==
Hjelm was born on 6 November 1858 in Lindesberg, Sweden.

Known as Fanny Hjelm, she studied at Slöjdskolan (now Konstfack University of Arts, Crafts and Design) and then at the Royal Swedish Academy of Fine Arts in Stockholm between 1878 and 1884.

== Career ==
Hjelm painted floral still lifes, landscapes and portrait miniatures, the latter often on ivory. Sitters included prominent figures from Swedish society, and the arts, such as Ellen Roosval von Hallwyl and members of the Swedish royal family, including King Gustaf V of Sweden and his Queen, Victoria of Baden.

Hjelm's work is held in the collections of the Nationalmuseum, the national gallery of Sweden, and Skokloster Castle. Four of her paintings are held by the Finnish National Gallery, alongside 12 letters between Hjelm and art collector Paul Sinebrychoff dating from the first years of the twentieth century.

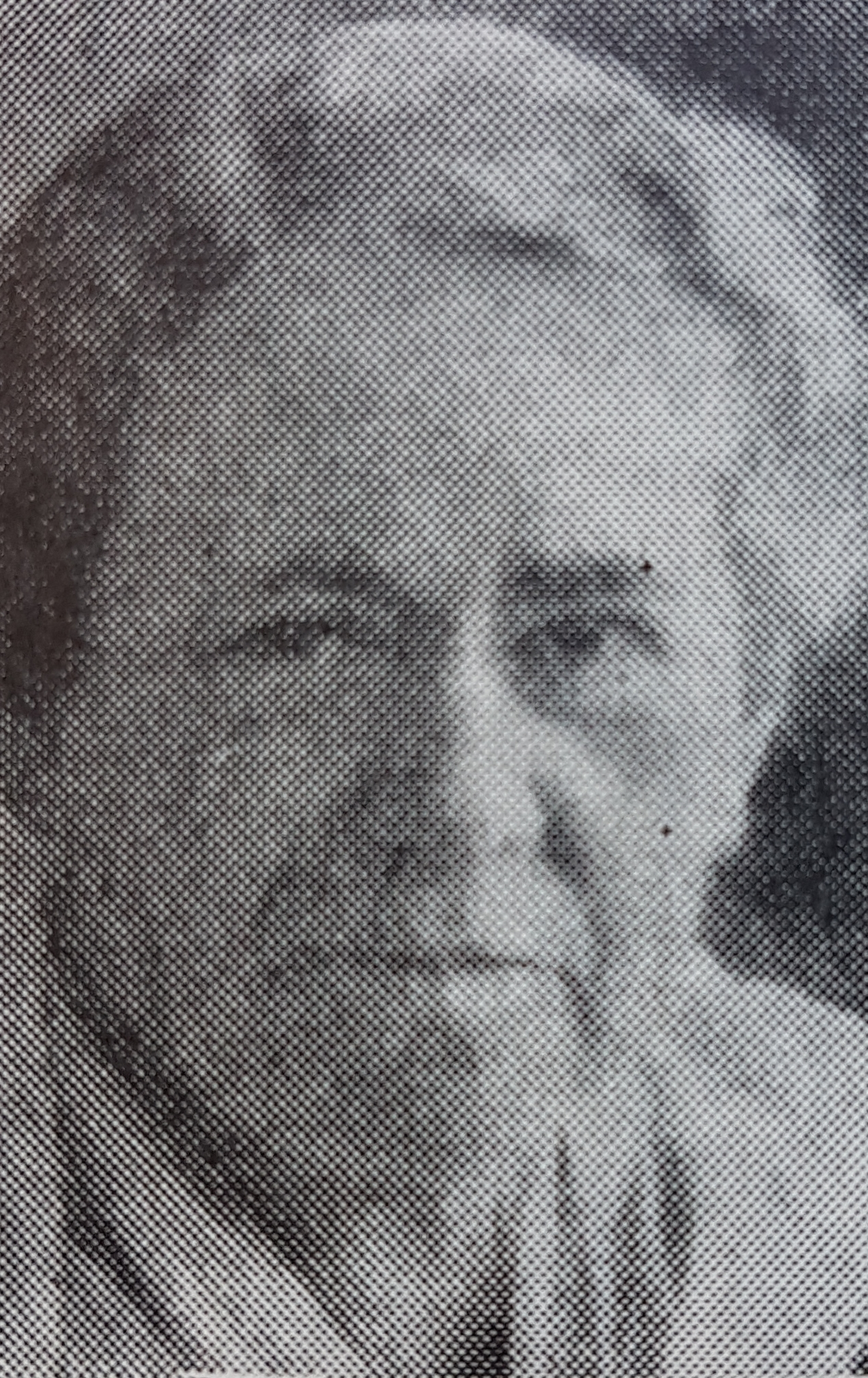
Fanny Hjelm in later life. Photograph from Allhem's Swedish Dictionary of Artists.

Hjelm died on 6 October 1944 in Stockholm, and is buried at Norra begravningsplatsen cemetery outside the city.

== Works ==
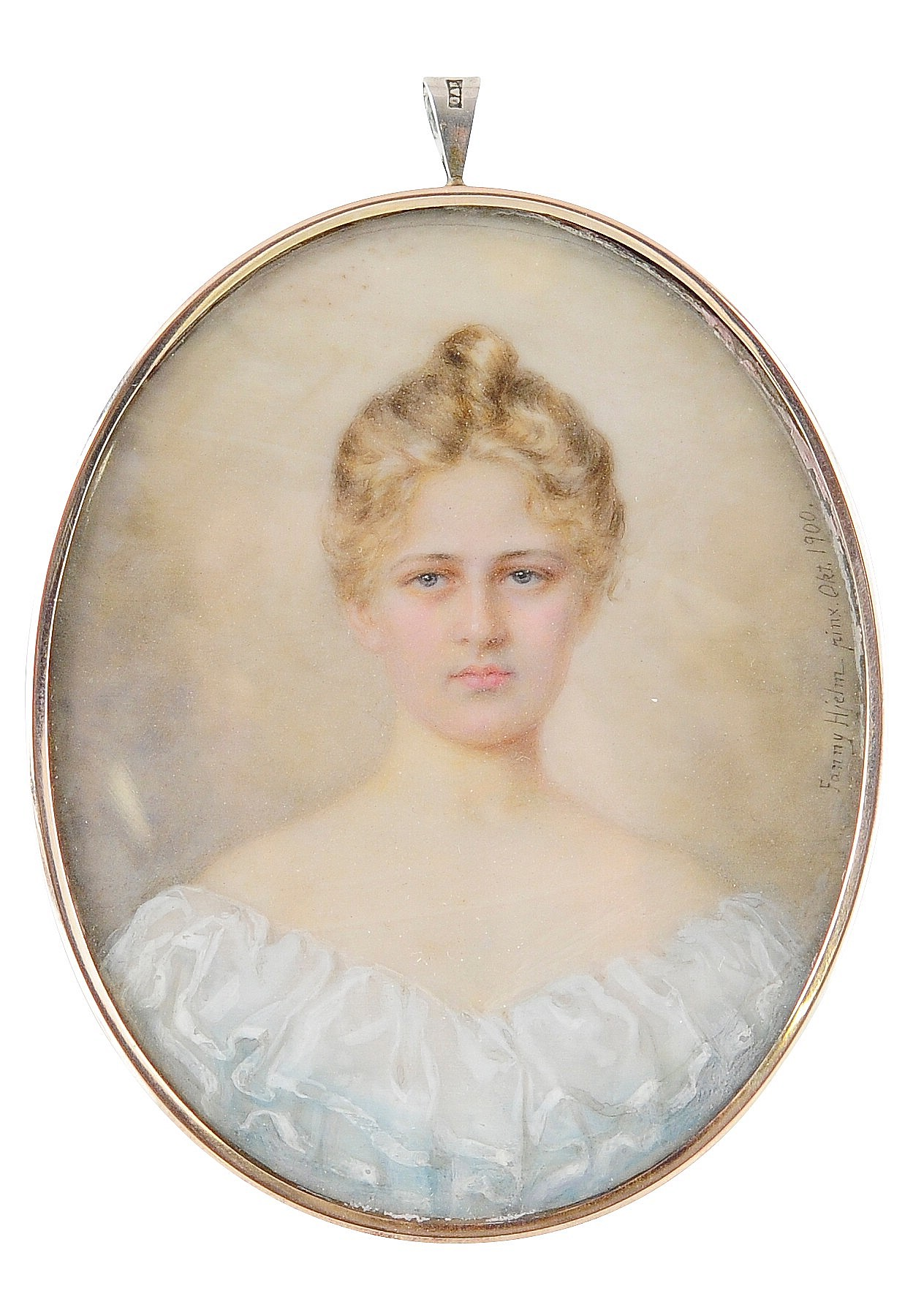
Portrait of Margot Rodatz by Fanny Hjelm

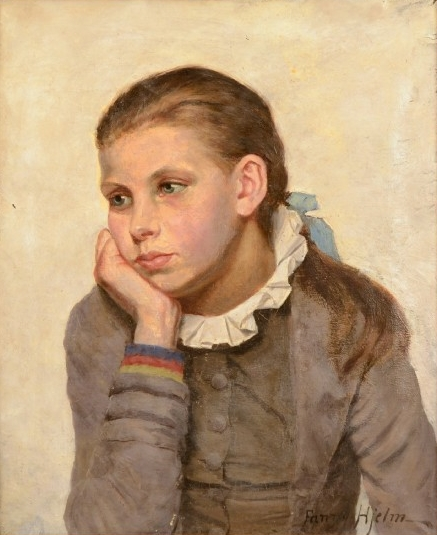
Flicka i tankar by Fanny Hjelm

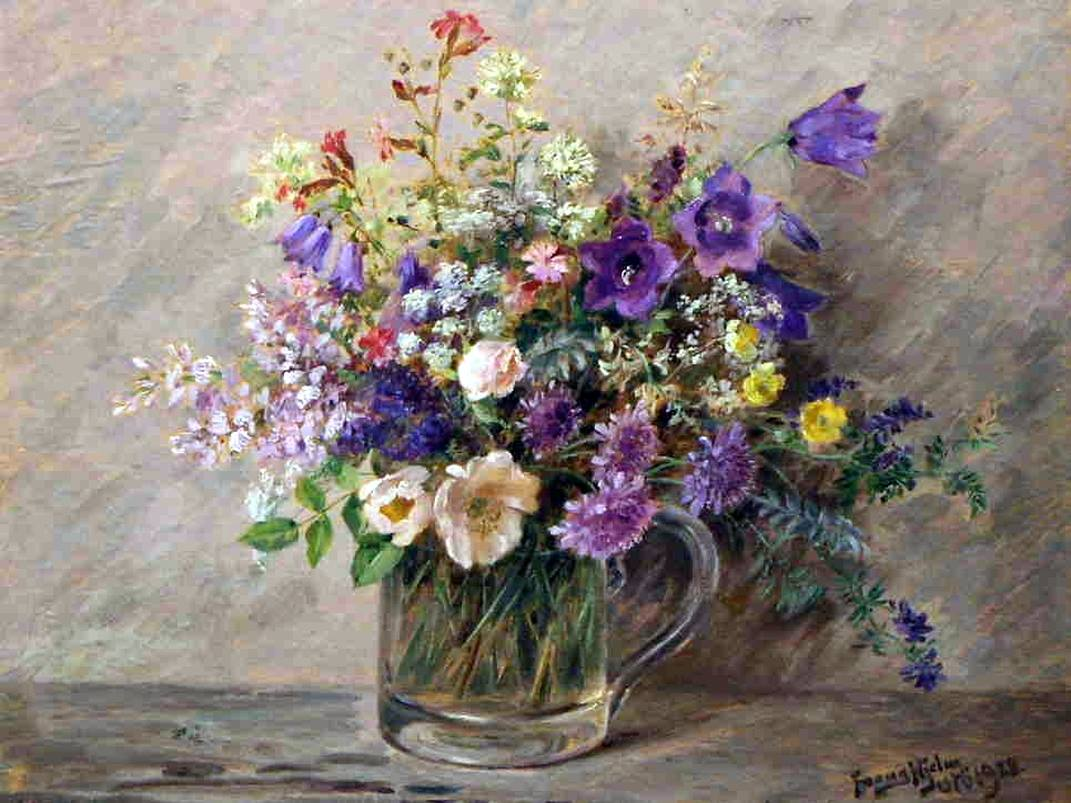
Sommarblommor 1928

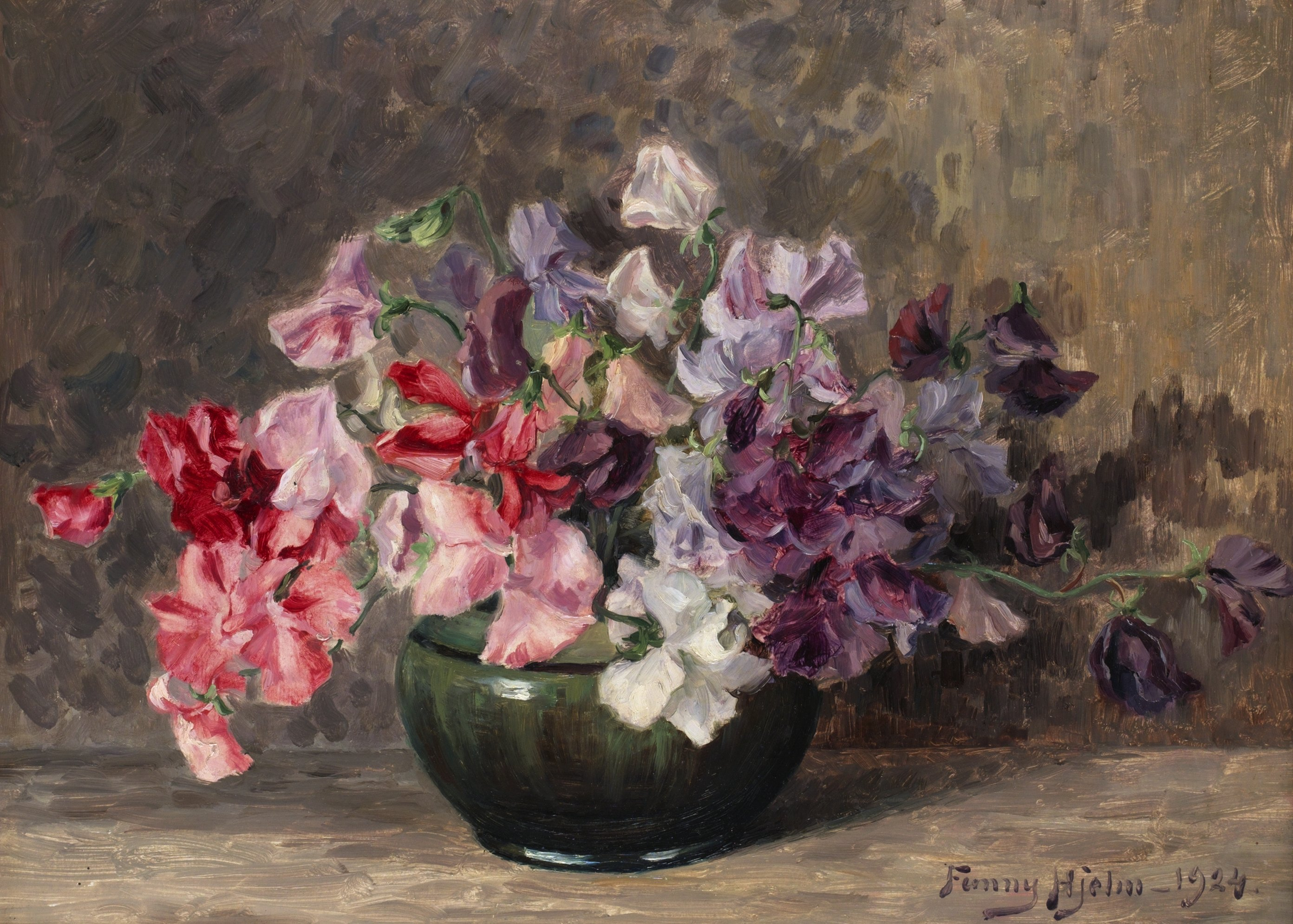
Flowers

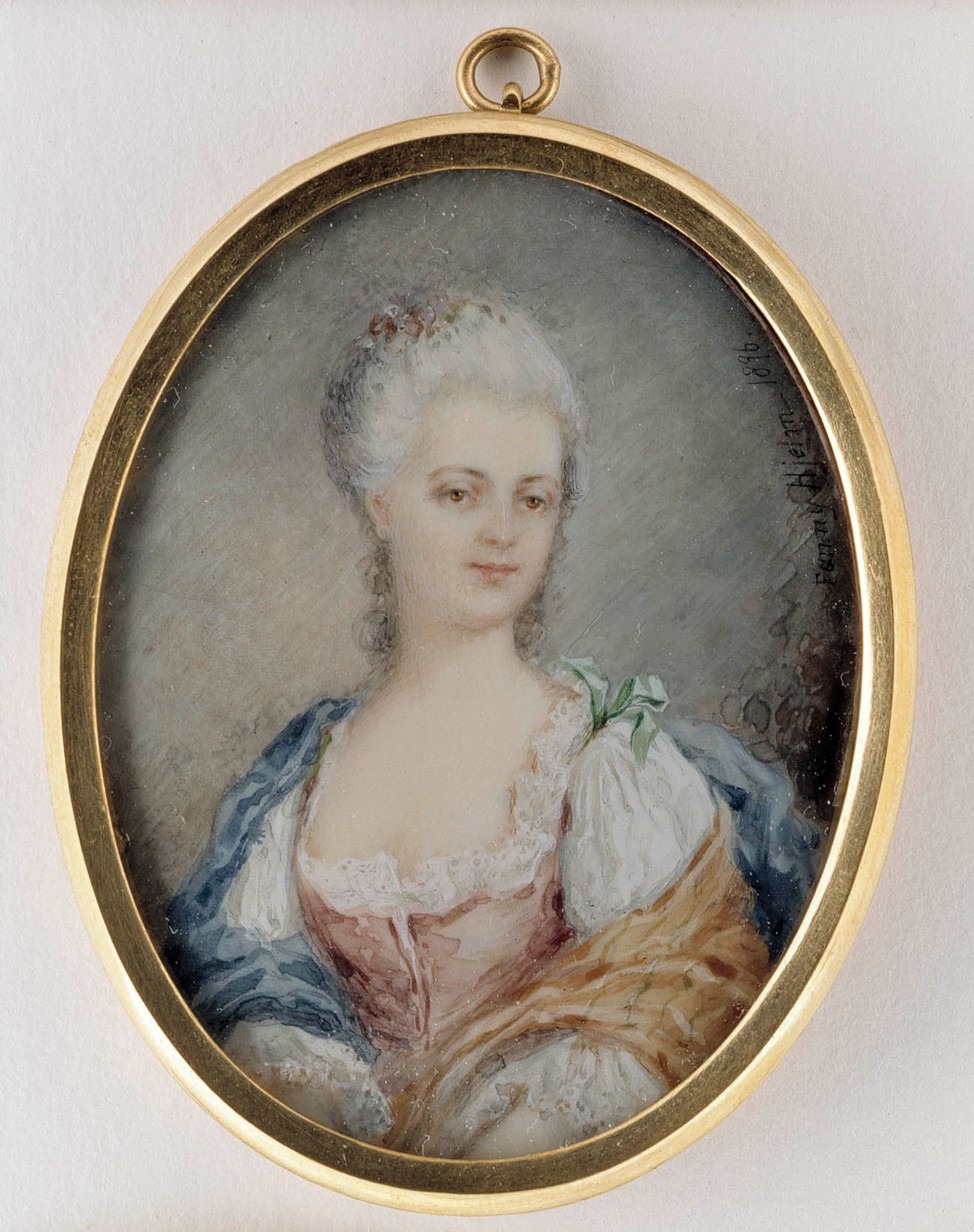
Fanny Hjelm - Portrait of a young lady Finnish National Gallery

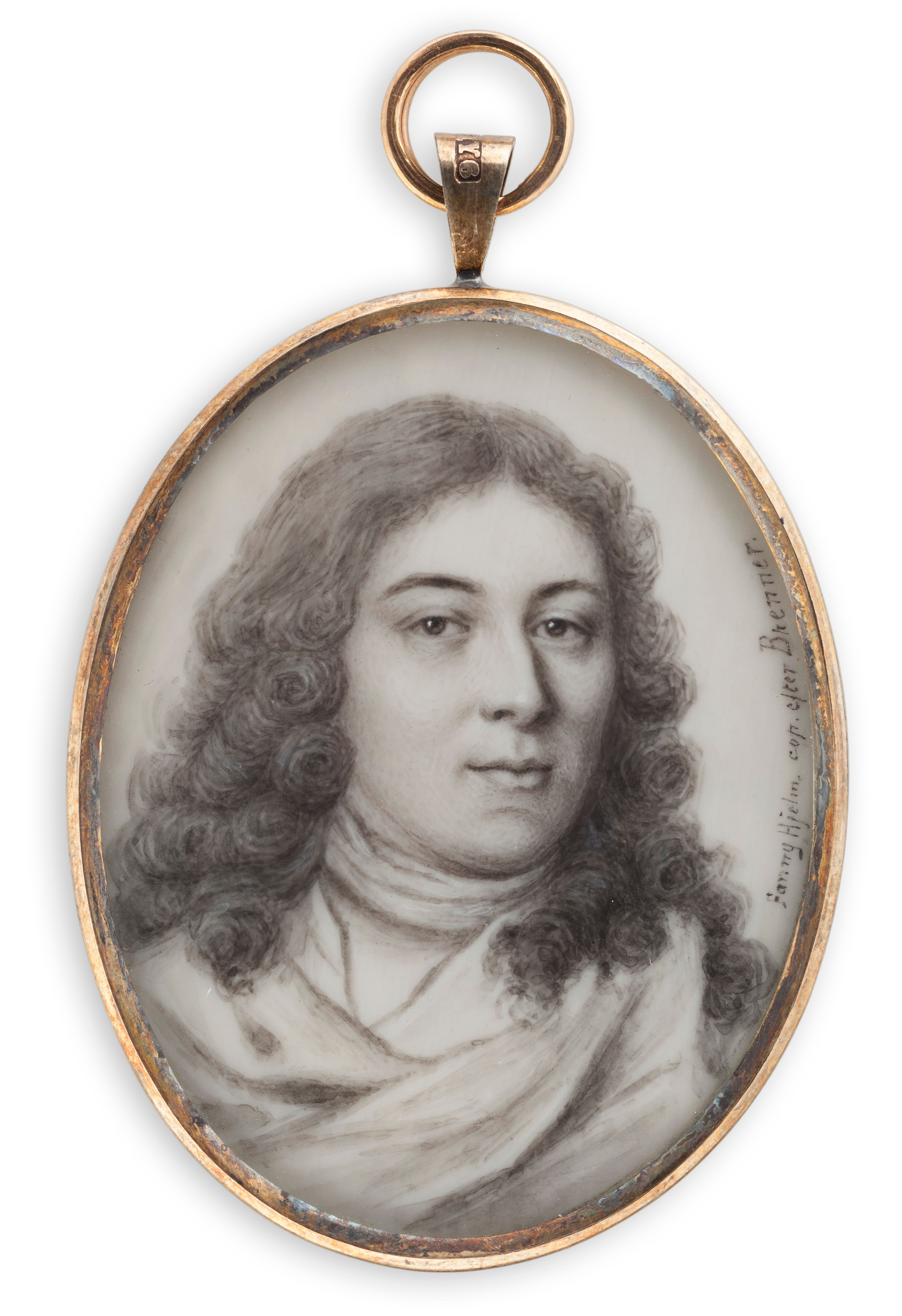
Fanny Hjelm - Portrait of Elias Brenner, Finnish National Gallery

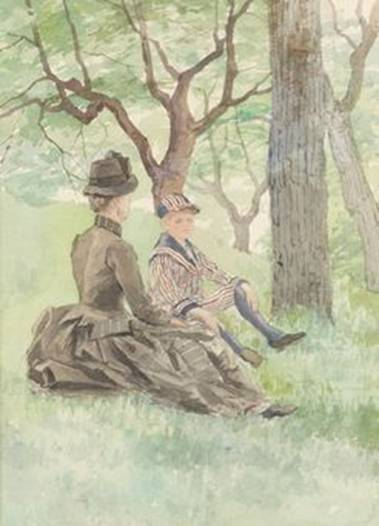
Fanny_Hjelm_1885

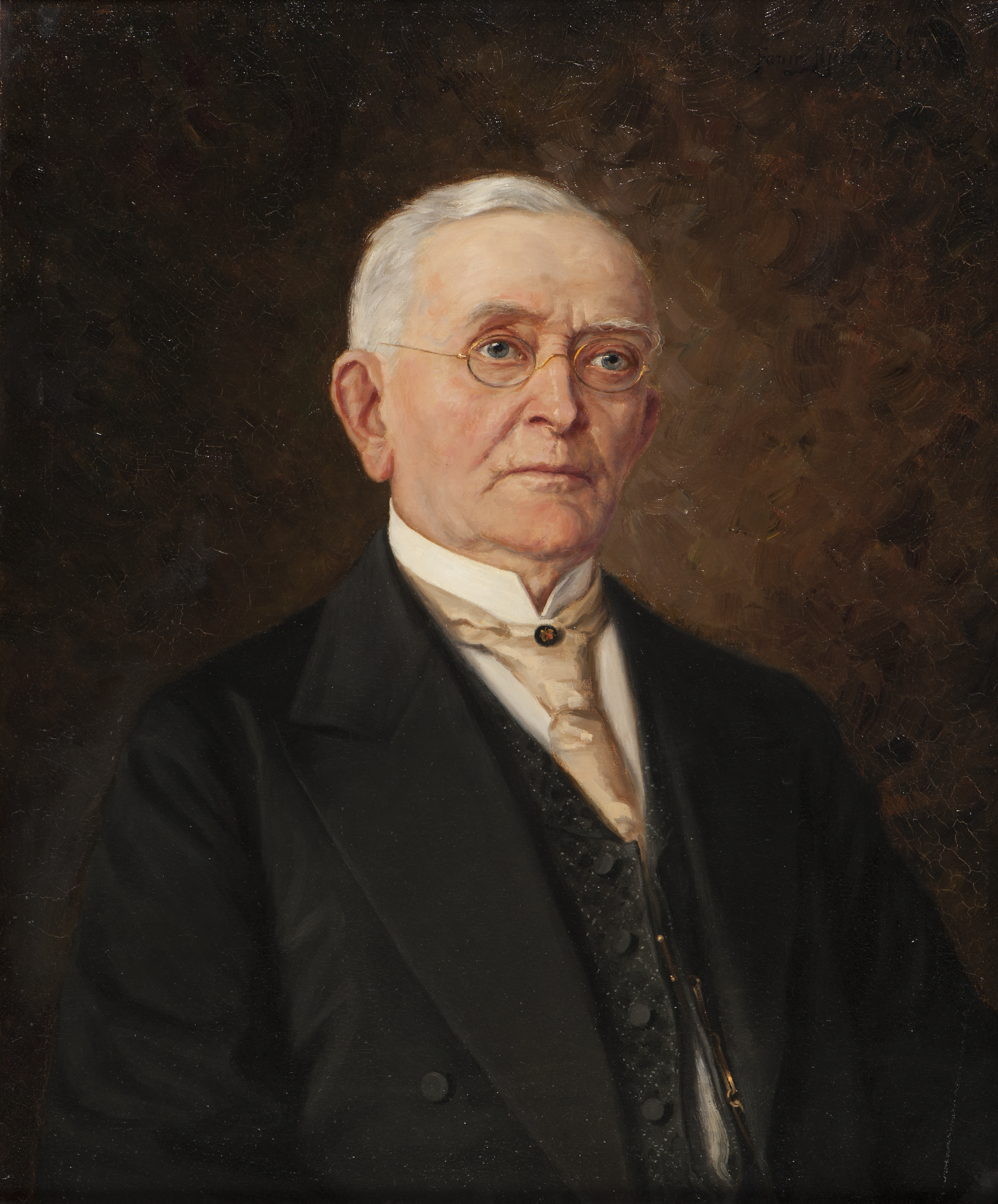
Portrait of Carl Lindvall

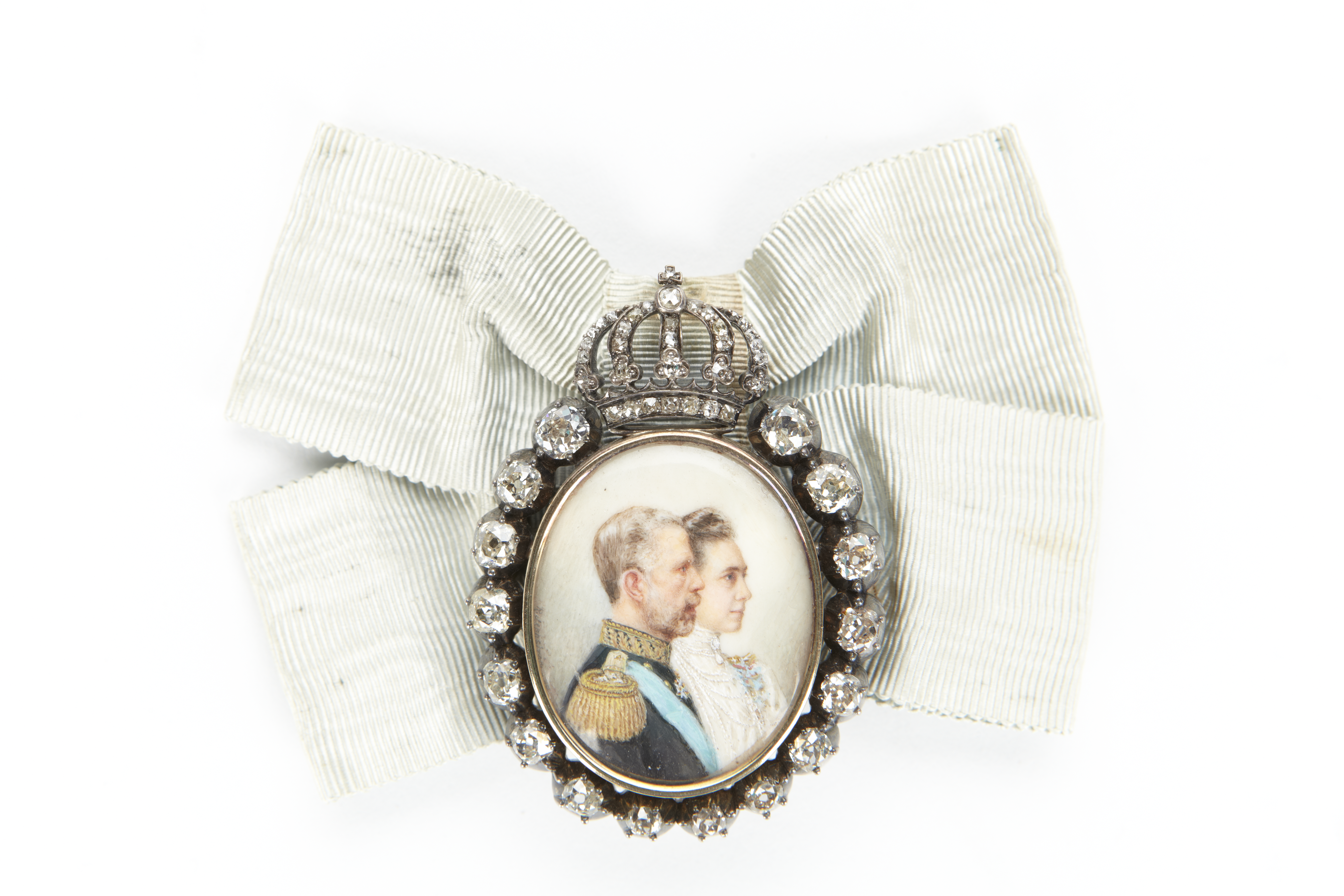
Miniature portrait of King Gustaf V of Sweden and his Queen Victoria of Baden, Royal family order presented to Countess Anna Brahe, held at Skokloster Castle

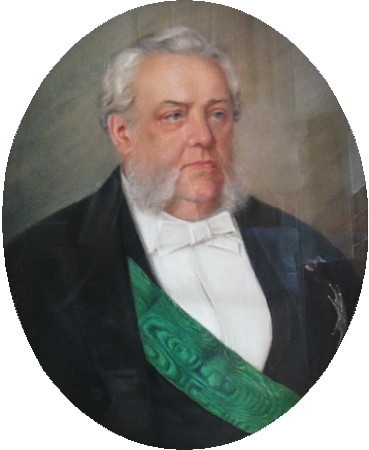
Alfred Bernhard de Maré (1897)
