= Sixth Conference of the International Woman Suffrage Alliance =

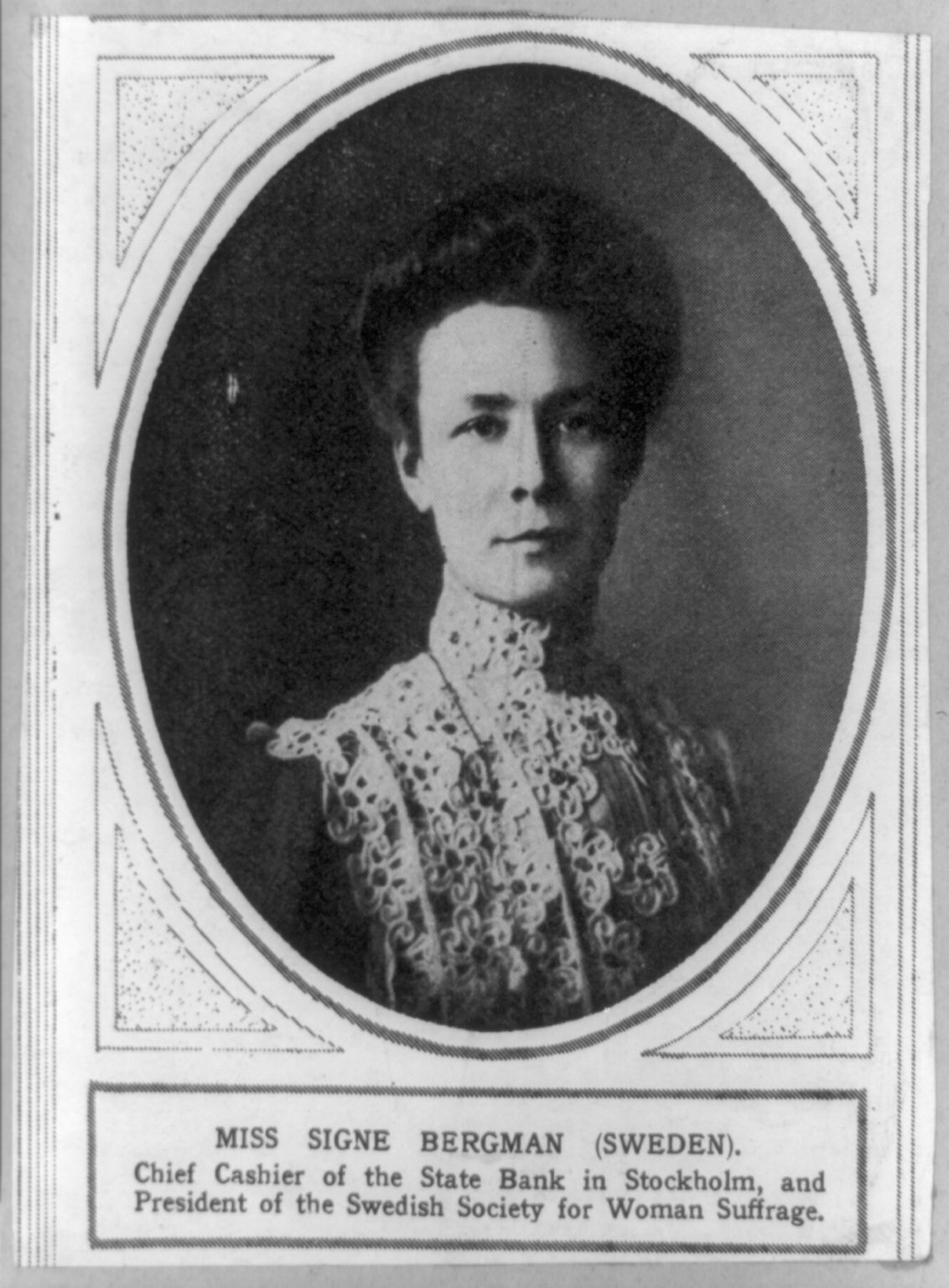
Signe Bergman, chair for the National Association for Women's Suffrage in 1914–1917.

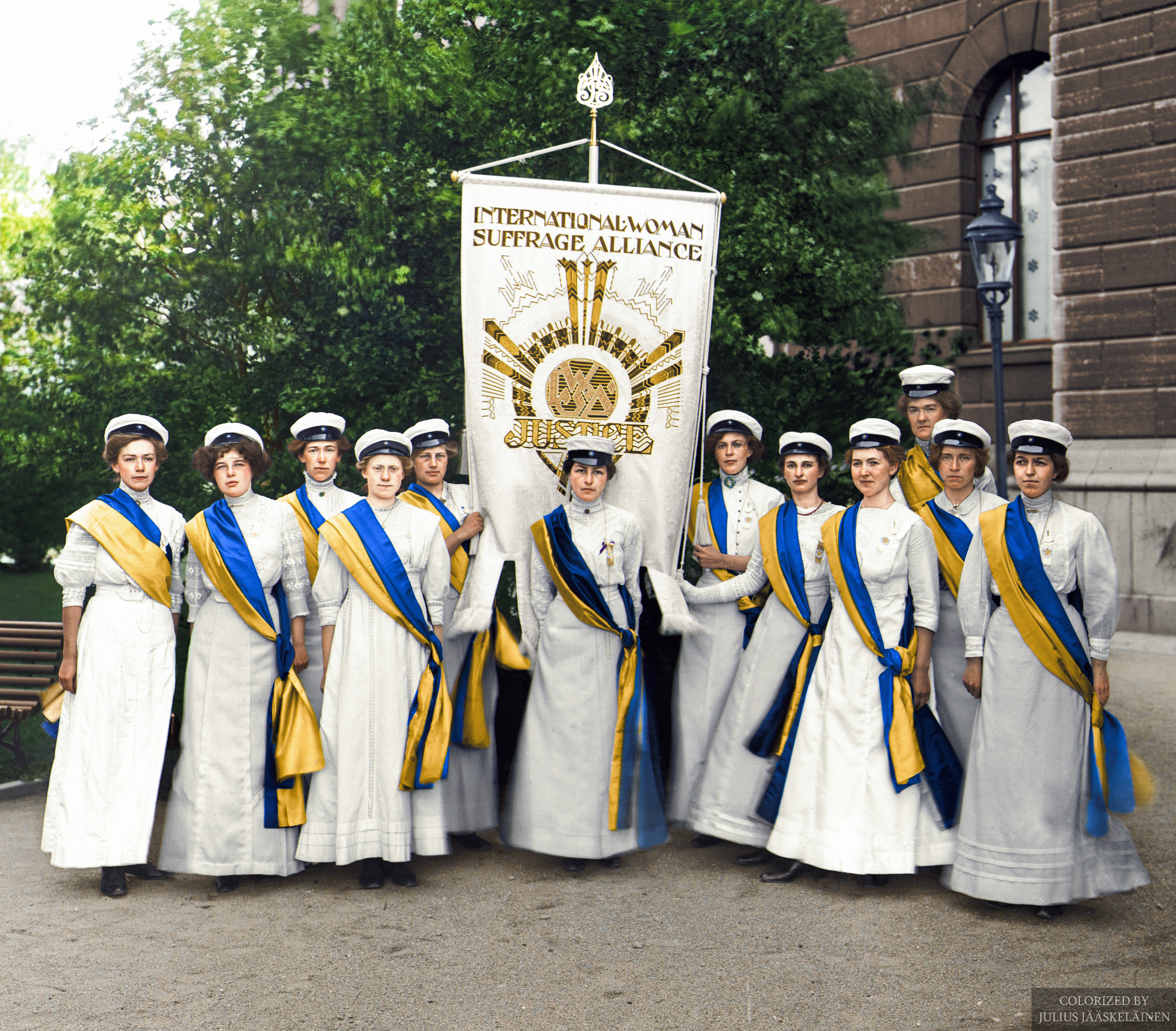
Colorized picture of Women from the Swedish National Association for Women's Suffrage (LKPR) (with student caps) in front of IWSA's (now IAW's) banner at the suffrage conference in Stockholm in 1911. Gold and white were the primary colors of the mainstream or liberal international women's suffrage movement, and had been used by American liberal suffragists since 1867

Sixth Conference of the International Woman Suffrage Alliance was held in June 1911 in Stockholm, Sweden. It was led by the organization's president, Carrie Chapman Catt.

The proceedings were inaugurated on Sunday, 11 June in the Gustaf Vasa Church. The welcome address was delivered at the Academy of Music by the president of the National Association for Women's Suffrage. There were 24 organized countries in attendance. One of the outcomes of the conference was the formation of an International Men's League which was joined by New York, England, Holland, Hungary, Germany and France. Ann-Margret Holmgren gave the Monday evening address. Ethel Snowden also spoke. On Tuesday evening, Selma Lagerlöf spoke, saying,

"Woman with man by her side, has created the Ideal Home; it is now time that woman should co-operate with man, and together they can create the "Ideal State"."

== Preparations ==
The committee which had been appointed to prepare for the congress and had been working for many months beforehand consisted of the Executive Committee of the central board of the National Suffrage Association and the presidents of sub-committees formed for different purposes. Signe Bergman acted as president, Axianne Thorstenson as vice-president, Anna Frisell as treasurer, Nini Kohnberger and Elise Carlson as secretaries. Axeline Virgin was at the head of the Finance Committee. The work of the Press Committee was directed by Else Kleen. Lily Laurent was at the head of the Committee on Localities. Lizinski Dyrssen headed the Committee for Festivities. Ezaline Boheman was the head of the Information Bureau. Alfhild Lamm and Eva Andén directed the work of the thirty university students who served as pages. At the head of the Travelling Committee was Dr. Martin Wester-Hallberg, who arranged the journey to Lapland.

== Proceedings ==
The Sixth Conference and Congress of the International Woman Suffrage Alliance took place in the banquet hall of the Grand Hotel, Stockholm, 12–17 June 1911. The coming of Carrie Chapman Catt, president of the Alliance, had been widely heralded. She had been received in Copenhagen with national honors by cabinet ministers and foreign legations. In Christiania, she was met with a greeting from a former Prime Minister and an official address of welcome from the Government and was received by King Haakon. In the midst of it all the woman suffrage bill came up for discussion in both Houses of the Parliament. The international president was escorted to the Lower House by a body of women that crowded the galleries. After a stormy debate the bill to enfranchise the women of Sweden received a majority vote. In the midst of the applause Catt was hurried to the Upper Chamber, the stronghold of caste and conservatism. Her presence did not save the bill from the usual defeat.

The congress opened with representatives from 24 affiliated National Associations and two Committees, those of Austria and Bohemia. The government of Norway sent as its official delegate Dr. Kristine Bonnevie. The list of delegates filled seven printed pages, the United States, the Netherlands and Sweden having the full quota of twelve delegates and twelve alternates, Germany lacking only three of the latter, while Great Britain, France, Denmark, Norway, Finland and Hungary had twelve or more. Six were present from Russia; Bulgaria, Serbia, Switzerland, South Africa, Iceland and Canada had representatives. Of fraternal delegates from other organizations there was no end—about 70 men and women—among them members of five Men's Leagues for Woman Suffrage—in the United States, Great Britain, Netherlands, Hungary and Sweden. In addition to the spoken words letters and telegrams of greeting were read from societies and individuals in twelve countries. The distinguished guests of the occasion were Dr. Selma Lagerlöf of Sweden, who had recently received the Nobel Literature Prize, and Helena Westermarck of Finland. Among prominent speakers were Mayor Carl Lindhagen and Ernest Beckman, M. P., the Rev. Knut Henning Gezelius von Schéele, Bishop of Visby, and the Rev. Dr. Samuel Fries. The ushers and pages were women students of the universities.

On the Sunday afternoon preceding the convention the precedent of all past ages was broken when Dr. Anna Howard Shaw preached in the ancient State Church of Gusta Vasa. Sunday evening a reception was given at the Restaurant Rosenbad to the officers, presidents of national auxiliaries and Swedish Committee of Arrangements by its chairman, Bertha Nordenson.

The official report of the first executive session Monday morning said: "Miss Janet Richards, delegate from the U. S. A., with an admirable speech, presented to the Alliance from the State which had recently given full suffrage to women a gavel bearing the inscription: "To the International W. S. A. from the Washington Equal Suffrage Association." It was announced that National Suffrage Associations had been formed in Iceland and Serbia and they were gladly accepted as auxiliaries, bringing the number up to twenty-six. The municipality had contributed 3,000 crowns to the congress, which proved to be the largest ever held in Stockholm. Season tickets had been sold to 1,200 persons and other hundreds bought tickets to the various meetings. During the entire week the flags of the nations represented at the congress floated from the flagstaffs that lined the quay in front of the Grand Hotel facing the royal palace, as far as the eye could reach. All the time Mrs. Catt was in the city the American flag was run up for her as a public guest wherever she went and the Swedish colors dipped a salute.

The Congress was formally opened in the afternoon of 12 June with addresses of welcome from Anna Whitlock, acting president of the National Suffrage Association of Sweden, and the Hon. Ernest Beckman, M. P., president of the National Swedish Liberal Association, and response from the Alliance was made by Chrystal Macmillan of Great Britain, proxy for Millicent Garrett Fawcett, its first vice-president. Anna Kleman, president of the Stockholm suffrage society, then presented the beautiful white satin, gold embroidered Alliance banner, which was carried by six university students in white dresses with sashes of the Swedish colors. Catt announced that the Alliance flag was now flying over the Grand Hotel where they were assembled. The banner was the gift of Lotten von Kroemer, a pioneer suffragist of Sweden, and the flag of the resident Atlantic, Gulf and Pacific Tea Co., US. A suffrage song written by K.G. Ossiannilsson and the music composed by Hugo Alfvén for the occasion was sung by the Women's Choir of Gothenburg, after which an official delegate of the Government extended its greeting while the audience rose and the flags of the nations waved from the galleries. Catt received an ovation as she came to the front of the platform to make her address. It filled twenty-three pages of the printed minutes and was a complete resume of the early position of women, the vast changes that had been wrought and the great work which the Alliance was doing.

At the official reception given by the National Suffrage Association of Sweden in the evening the guests were welcomed by Ann-Margret Holmgren and their appreciative responses were made by Margaret Emily Hodge, Australia; Gabriella Danzerova, Bohemia; Mrs. Daisy Minor, Austria; Miss Helen Clay-Petersen, Denmark; Miss Annie Furuhjelm, Finland; Madam DeWitt Schlumberger, France; Dr. Anita Augspurg, Germany; Olga Ungar, Hungary; Mrs. Philip Snowden, Great Britain. These were followed by a cantata beautifully rendered by the Gothenburg choir, words and music by women.

During the convention Lieutenant Colonel W. A. E. Mansfeldt of Holland made the report for its Men's League for Woman Suffrage; Dr. Charles Vickery Drysdale for Great Britain; Jean du Breuil for France; Dr. Alexander Patai for Hungary; Frederick Nathan for the United States, and the founding of an International Men's League was announced with Mansfeldt as secretary.

The reports of the work of the different branches and their discussion, bringing before the Alliance the experience and opinions of women from all parts of the world, were perhaps the most valuable feature of the conference. The most animated and vital of these discussions was the one of a political nature, divided into three parts:

1. What political work have the women of the enfranchised countries done, what is their relation to the different parties and how do these treat them? Have they any advice to offer? led by Miss Hodge, Mrs. Louise Keilhau, Norway; Dr. Tekla Hultin, M. P., Finland.
2. How can woman's political influence be brought to bear most effectively on Parliaments and governments? Led by Mrs. Snowden; Mrs. Anna B. Wicksell, Sweden; Dr. Käthe Schirmacher, Germany; Miss Richards.
3. What should be the relation of the suffrage movement to political parties in the unenfranchised countries?

Led by Eline Hansen, Denmark; Rosika Schwimmer, Hungary; Madame Pichon, France; Zinaida Mirovitch, Russia, there was a wide divergence of opinion but at last a resolution was unanimously adopted that "woman suffrage societies do their best work when organized in a non-partisan manner." In order to remove persistent misunderstanding a statement presented by Mrs. Catt was adopted explaining the wording of the resolution demanding "the franchise for women on the same terms as it is or may be exercised by men." It declared that the Alliance had on no occasion taken a position for or against any special form of suffrage but that the affiliated societies were left entirely free to determine for themselves which form they would demand. The Alliance did not express an opinion as to what should be the qualifications for enfranchisement, its sole object being to establish the principle that sex should not be a disqualification.

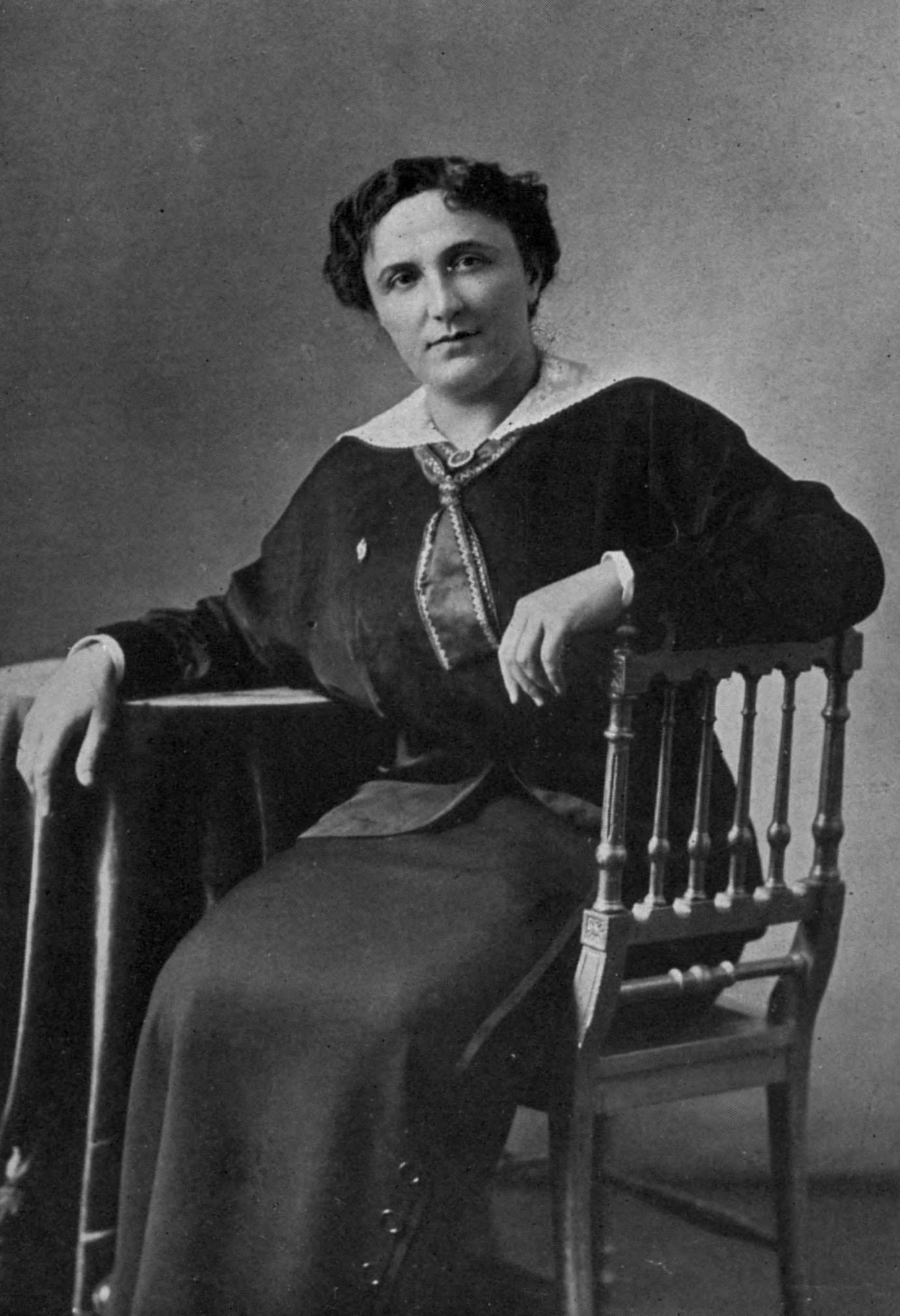
Dr. Shiskina-Yavein

Eminent women speakers spoke in the Royal Opera House of Stockholm on the second evening of the convention. Catt presided and addresses were made by Miss Westermarck, Dr. Augspurg, Mrs. Snowden, Miss Schwimmer, Dr. Shaw and Sweden's Selma Lagerlöf. Another which differed from all that had gone before was the great gathering in Skansen park, where at 7 o'clock, from two platforms, noted speakers from ten countries addressed an audience of thousands. A dinner followed in the park house, Hogenloft, with music, and then in the open air, the visitors saw the national dances and processions by the young people in the costumes of the country.

Although the official languages of the Alliance were French, German and English, a crowded meeting was held one evening in the People's House with the speeches in Scandinavian languages. It was opened by Mayor Lindhagen, an ardent advocate of woman suffrage. At another session the Woman Question in the Russian Parliament was considered by Dr. Shiskinа-Yavein; the Suffrage Outlook in Bohemia by Miss Marie Tůmová, recent candidate for Parliament; the Future of South African Women by Nina Boyle. A special meeting was held one afternoon in the hall of the Young Women's Christian Association. Marie Stritt, Germany; Maria Verone, France, and Miss Macmillan were appointed to compile a pamphlet of information about woman suffrage in all lands to be used for propaganda work.

The closing speech of the congress was made by the international president at Saltsjöbaden.

== See also ==
- International Alliance of Women

== Bibliography ==
- Stanton, Elizabeth Cady; Anthony, Susan B.; Gage, Matilda Joslyn; Harper, Ida Husted (1922). History of Woman Suffrage: 1900–1920 (Public domain ed.). Fowler & Wells.
