= Anna Whitlock =

Swedish reformer and suffragette (1852–1930)

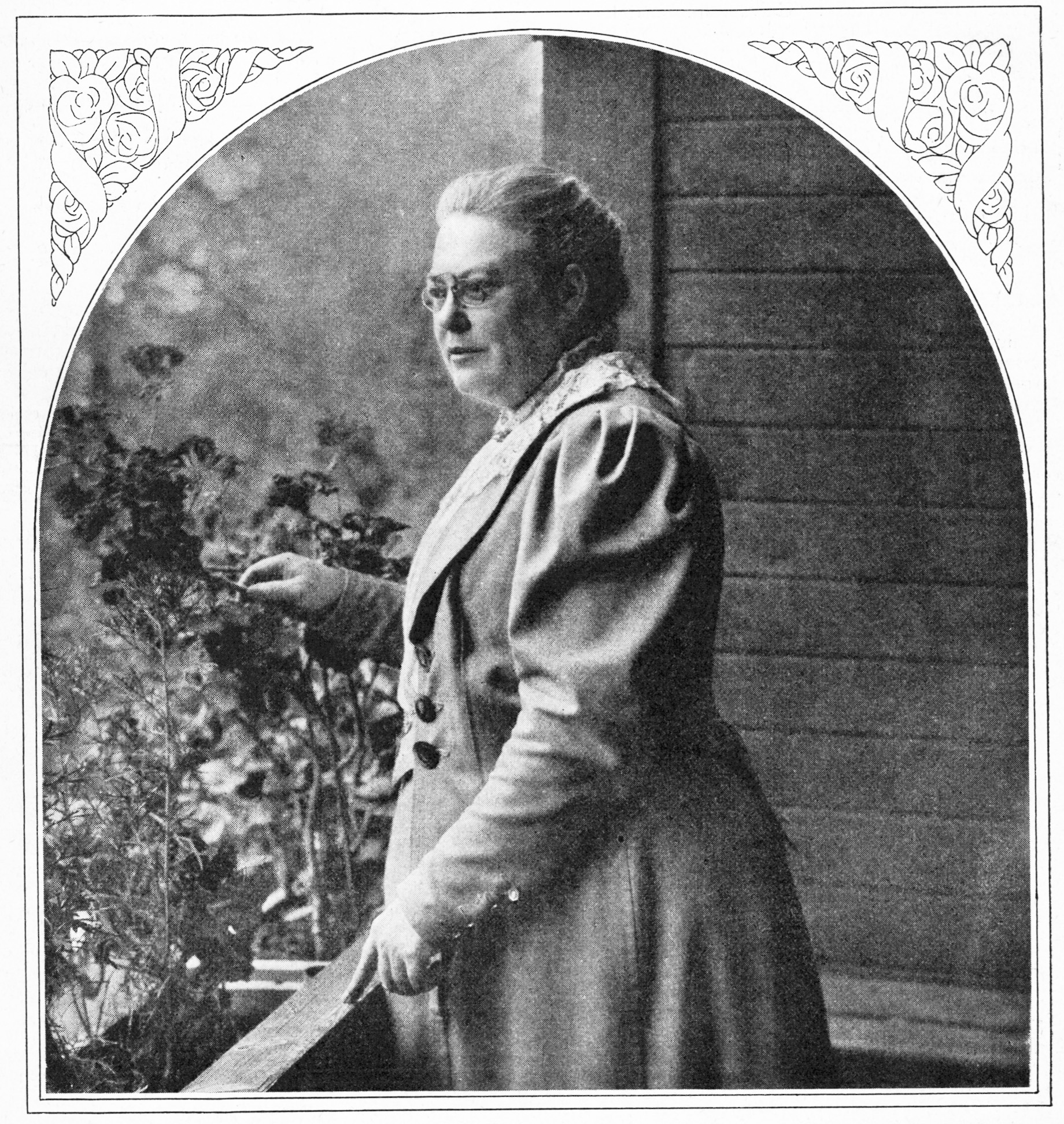
- Anna Whitlock
- Born: 13 June 1852; Stockholm, Sweden-Norway
- Died: 16 June 1930 (aged 78); Djursholm
- Occupations: teacher, journalist
- Known for: Woman's right activist

Notes
- Co-founder and twice chairperson of the National Association for Women's Suffrage.

Anna Whitlock (13 June 1852 – 16 June 1930) was a Swedish reform pedagogue, journalist, suffragette and feminist. She was co-founder and twice chairperson of the National Association for Women's Suffrage. She was also the co-founder of the women's cooperative food association Kvinnornas Andelsförening Svenska Hem.

== Early life ==
Anna Whitlock was the daughter of the merchant Gustaf Whitlock and Sophie Forsgrén, and the sister of the feminist and author Ellen Whitlock (1848–1936). When her father, a moderately well off businessman, was ruined, the family was supported by her mother, who was many years younger than her father, and who educated herself as a photographer and worked as a translator to support the family. It is said that Whitlock was given her interest in women's issues from her mother. After an inheritance, Sophie Whitlock engaged in building, had apartment buildings set up for female professionals, and also worked as a secretary for the women's organization Fredrika Bremer Association.

Whitlock studied at the Rossander Course. She worked as a teacher at the Adolf Fredriks folkskola in Stockholm in 1869–1870 and as a governess in Finland in 1870–1872 before enlisting as a student at the Högre lärarinneseminariet in Stockholm, from which she graduated in 1875. Between 1876 and 1878, she studied language and pedagogy in Switzerland, Italy, and France. During her study in France, she was the correspondent of Aftonbladet in Paris.

== Educational reformer ==
In 1878, she founded a school in Stockholm with Ellen Key, known later as the Stockholms nya samskola (New Co-educational School of Stockholm) and later still as Whitlockska samskolan (Whitlock Co-educational School), and served as its principal from its foundation to 1918. This was a pioneer institution. The school was made co-educational in 1893, which was very progressive. Normally only primary schools for children were co-educational in Sweden at the time. It soon became one of the first schools over primary educational level to be co-educational in Sweden. She also introduced innovations such as student councils, parent days, free choice of subject, voluntary education in religion, and vacation colonies for school children. Because of the strict religious tolerance of her school, it became popular among non-Lutherans such as Jews. Her school was successful, was granted government support, and the right to issue professional degrees.

== Social reformer and suffragist ==
Described as a liberal and forward- thinking character with modern progressive views, Whitlock was also active in politics, public debate and reform. She was a member of the board in the Föreningen för religionsfrihet (Freedom for Religious Liberty) for several years in the 1880s. She expressed her liberal views regarding religion as a speaker, and published a work on this issue: Skolans ställning till religionsundervisningen i Sverige och andra länder (The Position of the School regarding the teaching of Religion in Sweden and other nations). At that time, religious education in school normally consisted of educating students in their own religion (i.e., that of the state) and nothing else. Whitlock opposed this and made the subject voluntary in her school. She was active as a speaker on geography at the Stockholms arbetarinstitut (Stockholm Workers' Institute) from 1882 to 1897. She was also a member of the board of the Frisinnade kvinnor (now Svenska Kvinnors Vänsterförbund) from 1914 to 1923. Whitlock was an early member of the women's association Nya Idun, founded in 1885, and one of its first committee members.

Whitlock was one of the leading pioneers of the women's suffrage movement in Sweden. She was one of the co-founders of the National Association for Women's Suffrage. In 1902, two motions regarding women suffrage reform were presented to the Swedish Parliament. One was from the Minister of Justice Hjalmar Hammarskjöld, who suggested that married men be given two votes, as they could be regarded to vote in place of their wives as well. The other motion was presented by Carl Lindhagen, who suggested women's suffrage. The Hammarskjöld suggestion aroused anger among women's rights activists, who formed a support group for the Lindhagen motion. On 4 June 1902, National Association for Women's Suffrage (Föreningen för Kvinnans Politiska Rösträtt) or FKPR was founded: initially a local Stockholm society, it became a national organization the following year.

She was a member of the board and served as chairperson twice: from 1903 to 1907, and from 1911 to 1912. She wrote the first public appeal to the women of Sweden to form a suffrage movement in the press, and she organized the rules of the association. She had a very good relationship with her vice chairperson, Signe Bergman, and was respected for her ability to maintain the political neutrality of the association, even though she was personally a liberal. In 1911, when the suffrage movement was forced to take a political stand against the Conservatives who were by then the only party to oppose women's suffrage, the conservative Lydia Wahlström stepped down as chairperson. Whitlock was then elected for her second term as chairperson because of her respected ability to remain neutral.

In 1905, she co-founded Kvinnornas Andelsförening Svenska Hem with Ina Almén, a cooperative association which attempted to ensure better food quality. This association still exists today.

== Award ==
Whitlock was awarded the Swedish royal medal Illis quorum meruere labores (commonly called Illis Quorum) by King Gustaf V of Sweden in 1918.

== Legacy ==
The Anna Whitlock Memorial Fund (Anna Whitlocks Minnesfond) was founded after her school was discontinued in 1976, and still grants scholarships to students.

In 2018, a public high school was founded in Stockholm, Sweden, and named after her.

== In popular culture ==
The main character of the 2013 TV-series Fröken Frimans krig ("Miss Frimans war"), Dagmar Friman (portrayed by Sissela Kyle), was based on Anna Whitlock.
