= Ann-Margret Holmgren =

Swedish author, feminist, suffragist, and pacifist (1850–1940)

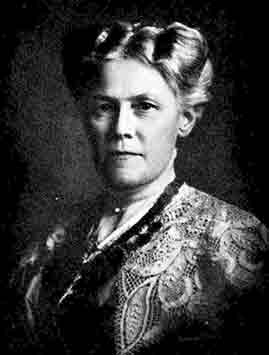
- Born: Ann-Margret Tersmeden; 17 February 1850; Uppland, Sweden
- Died: 12 October 1940 (aged 90)
- Other names: Märta Bolle
- Occupations: Writer, suffragist
- Spouse: Frithiof Holmgren (m. 1869; died 1897)

Anna Margareta "Ann-Margret" Holmgren (née Tersmeden; 17 February 1850 – 12 October 1940) was a Swedish author, feminist, suffragist, and pacifist.

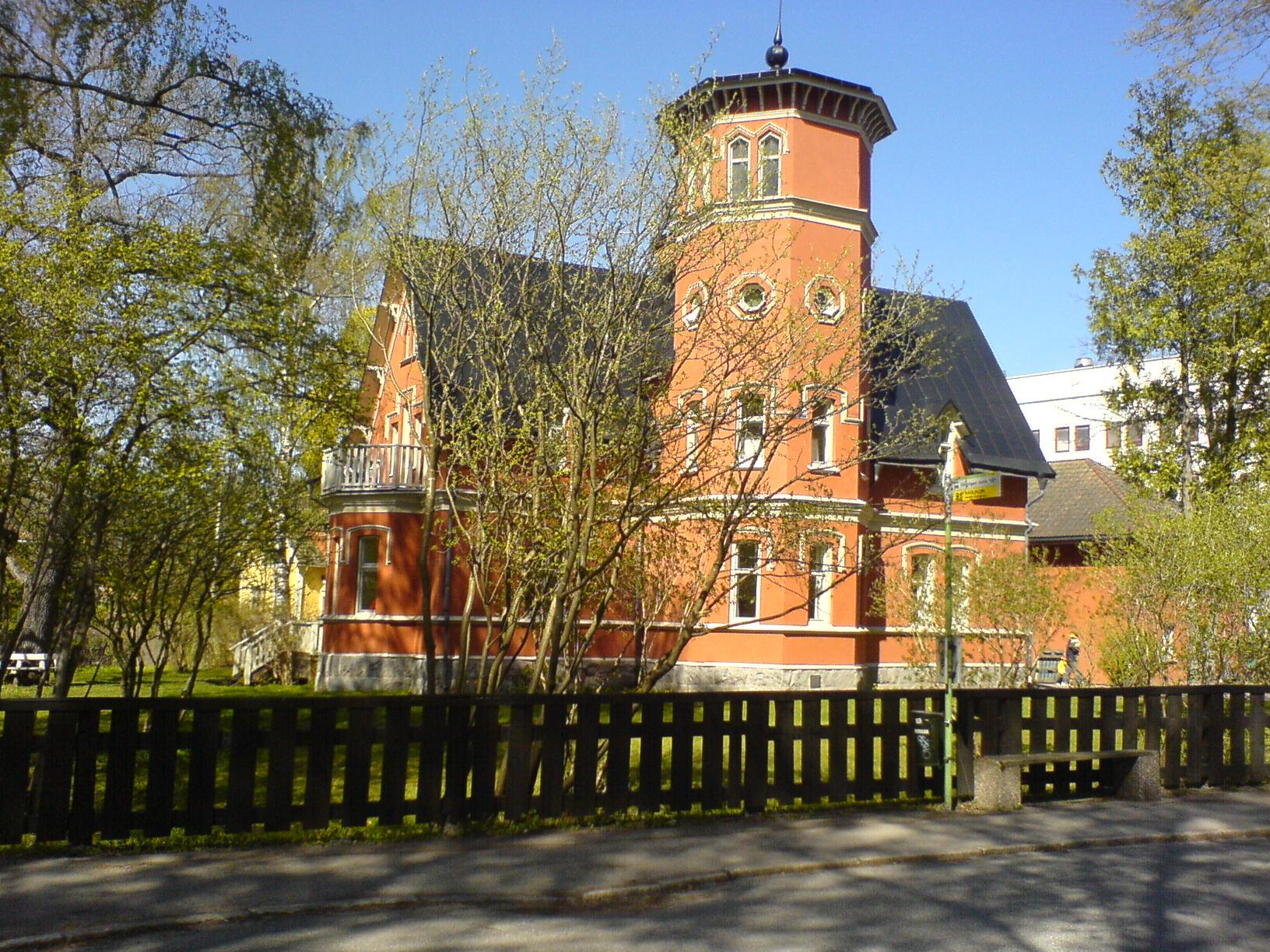
Villa Åsen in the district of Kåbo in Uppsala

== Life ==
Anna Margareta Holmgren was born at Hässle Manor in Uppland, Sweden. She was the daughter of Baroness Augusta Jacquette Cederström (1818–1860) and the conservative politician and courtier, nobleman Jacob Nils Tersmeden (1795–1867), thus great-granddaughter of Jacob Tersmeden and Lona Lisa Söderhielm.

In 1869, she married Frithiof Holmgren (1831–1897), medical doctor and professor at Uppsala University. Their residence, Villa Åsen in the district of Kåbo in Uppsala, was the site of discussion forums for intellectual students and a centre for radical and modern ideas. Among the modern ideas in these radical circles were the introduction of a republic, democracy, suffrage, workers' rights, contraception and atheism. This is thought to have given Holmgren radical sympathies, and she participated in the radical paper Verdandi from 1898 to 1905.

After the death of her husband in 1897, she moved to Stockholm where she was inspired by her friends Ellen Key and Lydia Wahlström to engage in gender equality. As a feminist, Holmgren caused considerable controversy by her support for love and sex outside of marriage, in conflict with the contemporary sexual double standard. Personally, she did not support the official position of the suffrage movement that women should be given the right to vote on "equal terms as men", because that would in fact mean that only women of legal majority would be able to vote; this would exclude married women, who were under the guardianship of their spouses, and Holmgren therefore also demanded the right for married women to vote, which meant that she demanded the right for married women to be declared adults.

In 1902, two motions regarding women suffrage reform were presented to the Swedish Parliament. One was from the Minister of Justice Hjalmar Hammarskjöld, who suggested that married men be given two votes, as they could be regarded to vote in place of their wives as well. The other motion was presented by Carl Lindhagen, who suggested women suffrage. The Hammarskjöld suggestion aroused anger among women's rights activists, who formed a support group for the Lindhagen motion. On 4 June 1902, the Association for Women's Suffrage (Föreningen för Kvinnans Politiska Rösträtt or FKPR) was founded: initially a local Stockholm society, it became a national organization the year after. Holmgren was the Vice Chairman of the Stockholm branch of the National Association for Women's Suffrage (Landsföreningen för kvinnans politiska rösträtt or LKPR) from 1902 to 1904 and the secretary of the executive committee of the Swedish Society for Woman Suffrage from 1903 to 1906. Within the suffrage movement, Holmgren's most important role was that of a speaker: she was the first member after the foundation of the movement to travel nationwide to speak, gather sympathisers and establish local sections of the suffrage movement, a task in which she made use of her wide network of contacts among former Uppsala students. On her 60th birthday in 1910, she was celebrated by the LKPR with a golden chain of 60 links, as she had founded 60 local branches of the women's suffrage society. She was awarded the Illis quorum on her 75th birthday.

Holmgren was also vice chairman of Sveriges kvinnliga fredsförening (Swedish Women's Peace Association) from 1901 to 1910, honorary member of the Nordic Museum and the Philochoros Student Folk Dance Association (Philochoros Studenternas Folkdansförening). After the LKPR was dissolved following the introduction of women's suffrage, Holmgren was one of the founders of the Svenska kvinnors medborgarförbund (Civic Society of Swedish Women) in 1921.

== Personal life ==
Holmgren was active as a writer under the pseudonym "Märta Bolle". She published Fru Stråhle. Tidsbilder ur tre släktled (1894) and När riddar Ulf suckar. Ur familjekrönikan på Höögsborg (1896), both translated into the German language.

Holmgren and her husband Frithiof Holmgren were the parents of eight children, including scientist Israel Holmgren (1871–1961). She died in 1940 and together with her husband was buried at the Uppsala old cemetery (Uppsala gamla kyrkogård).

== See also ==
- List of peace activists

== Related reading ==
- Walborg Hedberg; Louise Arosenius (1914) Svenska kvinnor från skilda verksamhetsområden (Stockholm: Albert Bonniers Förlag)
- Ulrika Knutson (2004) Kvinnor på gränsen till genombrott (Stockholm: Albert Bonniers Förlag) ISBN 978-91-4622-567-6
- Barbro Hedwall; Susanna Eriksson Lundqvist. red. (2011) Vår rättmätiga plats. Om kvinnornas kamp för rösträtt (Stockholm: Albert Bonniers Förlag) ISBN 978-91-7424-119-8
