= Kvinnornas Andelsförening Svenska Hem =

Swedish food cooperative

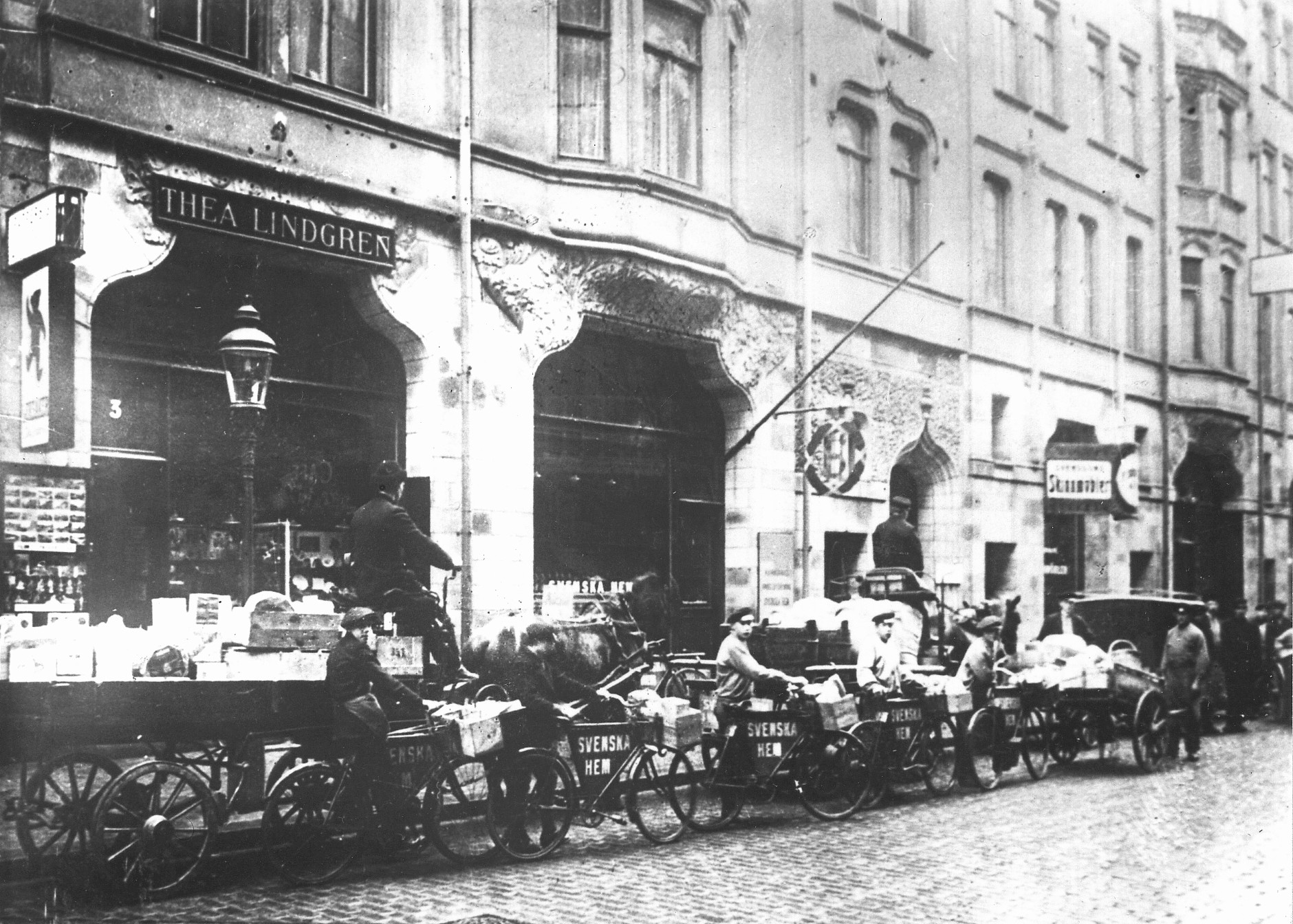
Svenska Hem, Mäster Samuelsgatan 3.

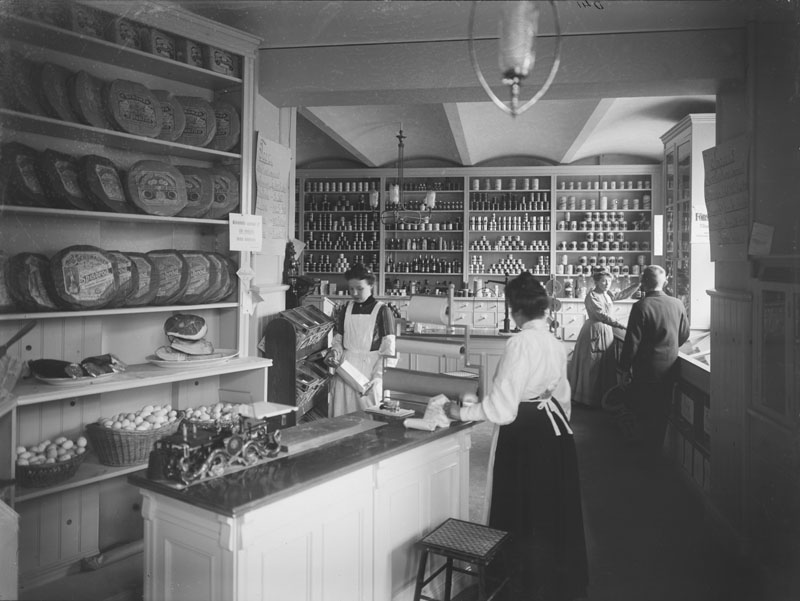
Svenska Hem, Karlbergsvägen 16

Kvinnornas Andelsförening Svenska Hem (literally: Women's Cooperative Society Swedish Home) or commonly just Svenska Hem (Swedish Home) was a Swedish food cooperative, founded in 1905, and merged with the Kooperativa Förbundet in 1916. During its existence, it was, for a time, the biggest food cooperative in Sweden, with five groceries and 3,300 members.

== History ==
The cooperative was co-founded 8 November 1905 in Stockholm by Anna Whitlock and Ina Almén as an effort to ensure good quality of the food in the city's groceries. At the time it was not uncommon for grocers to mask bad food by such means as, for example, mixing chalk into sugar.

The idea of Svenska Hem was a cooperative managed by women, which was to provide healthy food with high quality at reasonable prices. A bonus system was established for the benefit of the customers. It sold meals of prepared food, which was innovative at the time, and provided home delivery. Svenska Hem arranged cooking courses and published the first cooperative magazine in Sweden. Only female managers were hired in the shops of the cooperative, and the staff was given equal salary and a share of the profit.

The cooperative was met with resistance and a boycott by the Stockholm Grocery Society, but survived and enjoyed success. It had 3300 female cooperative members, many of whom were famous, such as Selma Lagerlöf, Ellen Key, Emilia Broomé, Anna Branting, Elin Wägner, Karolina Widerström, Hanna Pauli, Karin Larsson and Harriet Bosse.

In 1915, Nordiska Kompaniet was founded, and Svenska Hem was not able to defeat the competition. It merged with the Kooperativa Förbundet "Konsum" (Cooperative Union) in 1916. The former shops of Svenska hem was thereafter incorporated in to the Konsum-shops and changed their name.

== Fiction ==
The story of the Svenska Hem-cooperative was portrayed in the series Fröken Frimans krig (2013-2017), with Anna Whitlock renamed Dagmar Friman and played by Sissela Kyle.
