= Signe Bergman =

Swedish feminist (1869–1960)

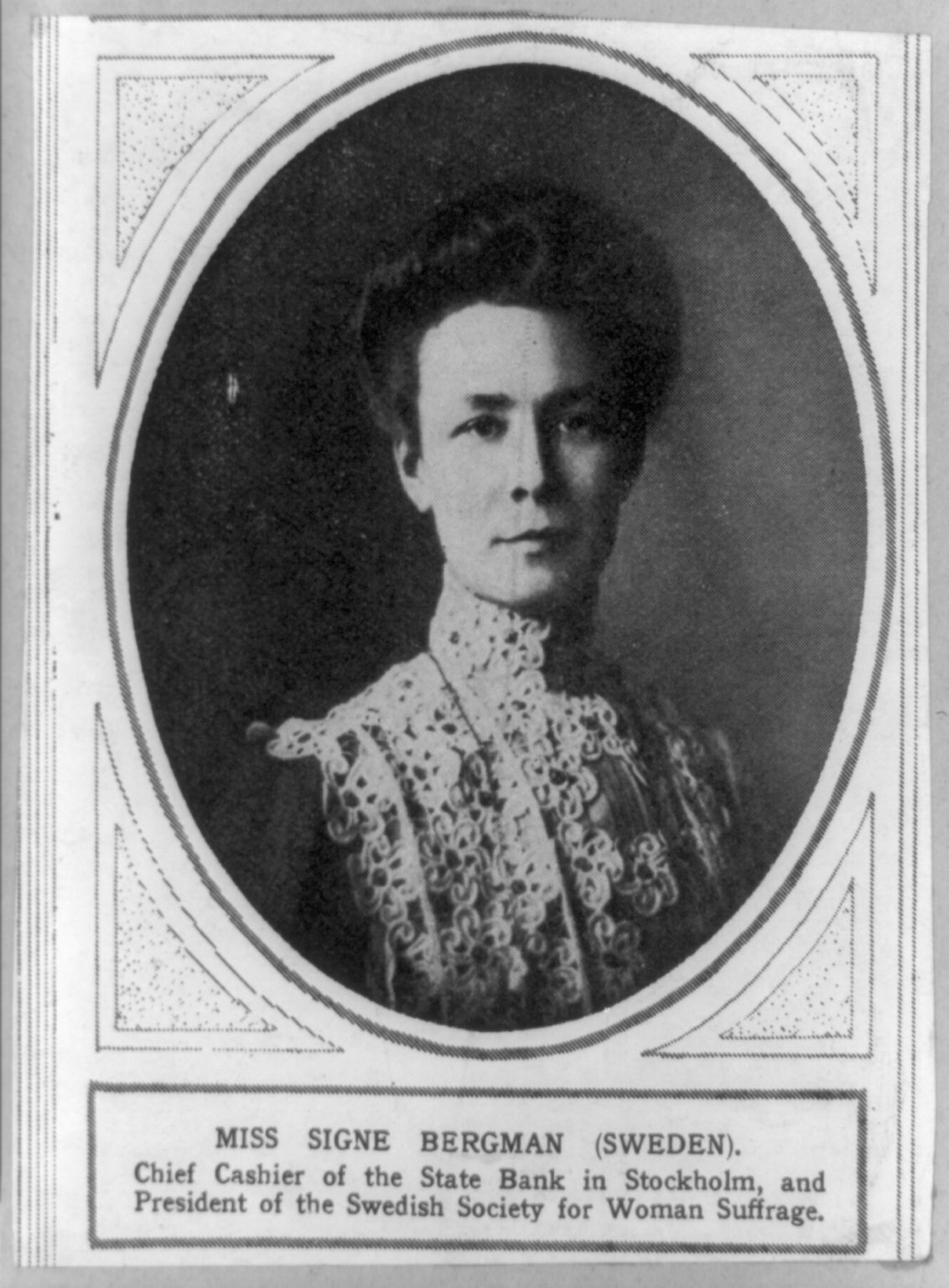
- Signe Bergman, chairman for the Swedish Society for Woman Suffrage in 1914–1917.
- Born: 10 April 1869; Hedvig Eleonora Parish, Sweden
- Died: 9 May 1960 (aged 90); Oscar Parish, Sweden
- Occupation: Clerk
- Known for: Women's rights activist

Signe Wilhelmina Ulrika Bergman (10 April 1869 – 9 May 1960) was a Swedish feminist. She was the chairperson of the National Association for Women's Suffrage (LKPR) which was then called The Swedish Society for Woman Suffrage in English (see photo to the right here) from 1914 to 1917 and the Swedish delegate to International Woman Suffrage Alliance from 1909 to 1920. She was the organiser of the congress of the Sixth Conference of the International Woman Suffrage Alliance in 1911 and the editor of the paper of the LKPR, Rösträtt för kvinnor (Women's suffrage).

== Biography ==
Signe Bergman was born a member of a family of officials in Stockholm and was given a high but informal education. She spent some years in Great Britain, where she worked in the institute of her cousin Martina Bergman-Österberg, as well as an assistant to a researcher at the British Museum before she returned to Sweden, where she worked as a clerk at the Sveriges allmänna hypoteksbank. Bergman lived alone in a time when it was considered more suitable for a professional middle-class woman to share her flat with a female companion for modesty's sake.

Bergman was one of the leading figures of the Swedish suffrage movement, if not the perhaps most famous during her lifetime. In 1902, two motions regarding women's suffrage reform were presented to the Swedish Parliament. One was from the Minister of Justice Hjalmar Hammarskjöld, who suggested that married men be given two votes, as they could be regarded to vote in place of their wives as well. The other motion was presented by Carl Lindhagen, who suggested women's suffrage. The Hammarskjöld suggestion aroused anger among women's rights activists, who formed a support group for the Lindhagen motion. On 4 June 1902, Föreningen för Kvinnans Politiska Rösträtt (FKPR) was founded: initially a local Stockholm society, it became a national organization, the National Association for Women's Suffrage, the year after. From 1906 to 1914, she was a member of the central committee of the Stockholm chapter of the LPKR; in 1907, she became a member of the central committee of the organisation as a whole; and from 1914 until 1917, she was its chair. She was also the editor of the organisation's paper, and from 1909 to 1920, she was a member of the International Woman Suffrage Alliance and represented Sweden at several international suffrage congresses.

In an interview in the paper Idun in 1911, she explained why she became active in the struggle for women's suffrage:

It was Carl Lindhagen's second motion on women's suffrage which was mocked and simply put down. It was for our sake he fought – should not women like me stand up?

Formally, Bergman was chair 1914–1917, but in reality, she was pointed out as the central figure of the Swedish suffrage movement both by its members as well as by the press from the start. This is illustrated by contemporary media, where she was frequently caricatured as the Rösträttsgeneralen (The suffrage general). She was a social democrat, described as firm and effective, and is referred to as the dominant force within the organisation's central committee and the brain behind its actions, collections and meetings. She was also the organiser of the congress of the Sixth Conference of the International Woman Suffrage Alliance in 1911, which was described as a great success of the LKPR.

In 1911, the politically right-wing chair of the LKPR, Lydia Wahlström, resigned as chair officially for health reasons. In reality, the LKPR, which had a policy of political neutrality, had adopted a new policy of boycotting political parties that opposed women's suffrage. In reality, this meant that the LKPR was no longer politically neutral, as the only Swedish party which opposed women's suffrage was the conservative party. As Wahlström was herself a conservative, she resigned, which caused conflicts between right-wing and left-wing women in the LKPR. As Bergman, who was regarded as the obvious choice for the next chair, was known for her socialist opinions, the former and more apolitical chairman Anna Whitlock was regarded as a more non-controversial choice. Bergman was therefore not formally made chair until the conflicts had calmed down in 1914. In 1917, there was a majority in the parliament of parties favourable to women's suffrage, but a motion for women's suffrage was still voted down. This caused Bergman to resign from her position.
