= Lydia Wahlström =

Swedish historian, author and feminist (1869–1954)

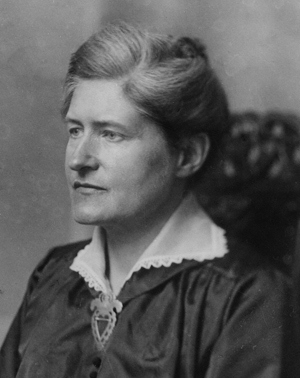
Lydia Wahlström

Lydia Katarina Wahlström (28 June 1869 – 2 June 1954) was a Swedish historian, author and feminist. She was one of the founders of the National Association for Women's Suffrage and its chairman in 1909–1911.

== Early life and education ==
Lydia Katarina Wahlström was born on 28 June 1869 in Lundby, Västmanland, the youngest, by eleven years, of the four daughter of the vicar Johan Gustaf Wahlström and Ida Schmidt. Her elder sister served as her first teacher and she said that Wahlström was in some ways raised as a boy, and she enjoyed dressing like one. She studied at the Wallinska skolan in Stockholm, and was accepted at the Uppsala University in 1888. She qualified with a Bachelor of Arts in history, Nordic languages and political science and made a disputation in 1898. As a student, she founded Uppsala Kvinnliga Studentförening, the first organisation for female students at Uppsala University, whose members wore their students' caps in public even though it was considered unsuitable for their gender.

== Career ==
Wahlström wanted to be a pastor like her father but this was impossible, although she tried to get this changed. She tutored in Christianity in Uppsala, managed a girls' school in England and was finally made principal at the Åhlinska skolan in Stockholm. She was a co-founder of the Swedish Society for Woman Suffrage together with Signe Bergman, Anna Whitlock and Ann-Margret Holmgren. In 1902, two motions regarding women's suffrage reform were presented to the Swedish Parliament. One was from the Minister of Justice Hjalmar Hammarskjöld, who suggested that married men be given two votes, as they could be regarded to vote in place of their wives as well. The other motion was presented by Carl Lindhagen, who suggested women's suffrage. The Hammarskjöld suggestion aroused anger among women's rights activists, who formed a support group for the Lindhagen motion. On 4 June 1902, Landsföreningen för Kvinnans Politiska Rösträtt (LKPR) was founded: initially a local Stockholm society, it became a national organisation the following year.

Wahlström was one of LKPR's leading speakers, ideologists and writers, and represented the organisation internationally on several occasions. Her academic titles gave scientific credibility to the movement, and she served as chairman of FKPR in 1907–1911. She was one of few members to openly confess to being a political conservative. LKPR was supported by women with both left and right-wing political sympathies. In practice, the political neutrality was abandoned by the resolution of 20 June 1911, when the LKPR decided to form a voters' boycott against all politicians opposing women's suffrage and support those in favor. In reality, this meant that the organisation was no longer politically neutral, as the main opposition of women's suffrage was the Conservatives, while Liberals and the Social Democrats were in favour of women's suffrage as soon as full male suffrage had been introduced. This had happened in 1909. Wahlström, as a conservative, therefore left her position as chairperson and was replaced by her predecessor, the more apolitical Anna Whitlock.

Wahlström was also active within the Fredrika Bremer Association and Nya Idun, a women's association.

She received several awards, including the Litteris et Artibus and Illis quorum.

Lydia Wahlström published many works about Christianity and history. She died in Stockholm, aged 84.

== Sources ==
- Eman, Greger (1993). Nya himlar över en ny jord: om Klara Johanson, Lydia Wahlström och den feministiska vänskapskärleken (in Swedish). Lund. ISBN 9789186488864.
- Hedwall, Barbro (2011). Eriksson Lundqvist, Susanna (ed.). Vår rättmätiga plats. Om kvinnornas kamp för rösträtt [Our Rightful Place. About women's struggle for suffrage] (in Swedish). Förlag Bonnier. ISBN 978-91-7424-119-8.
- Pärletun, Ingrid (2018). Lydia Wahlström (in Swedish). Lund: Historiska media. ISBN 978-91-7545-717-8.
