= Per Naroskin =

Swedish psychologist, author and stand-up comedian (born 1959)

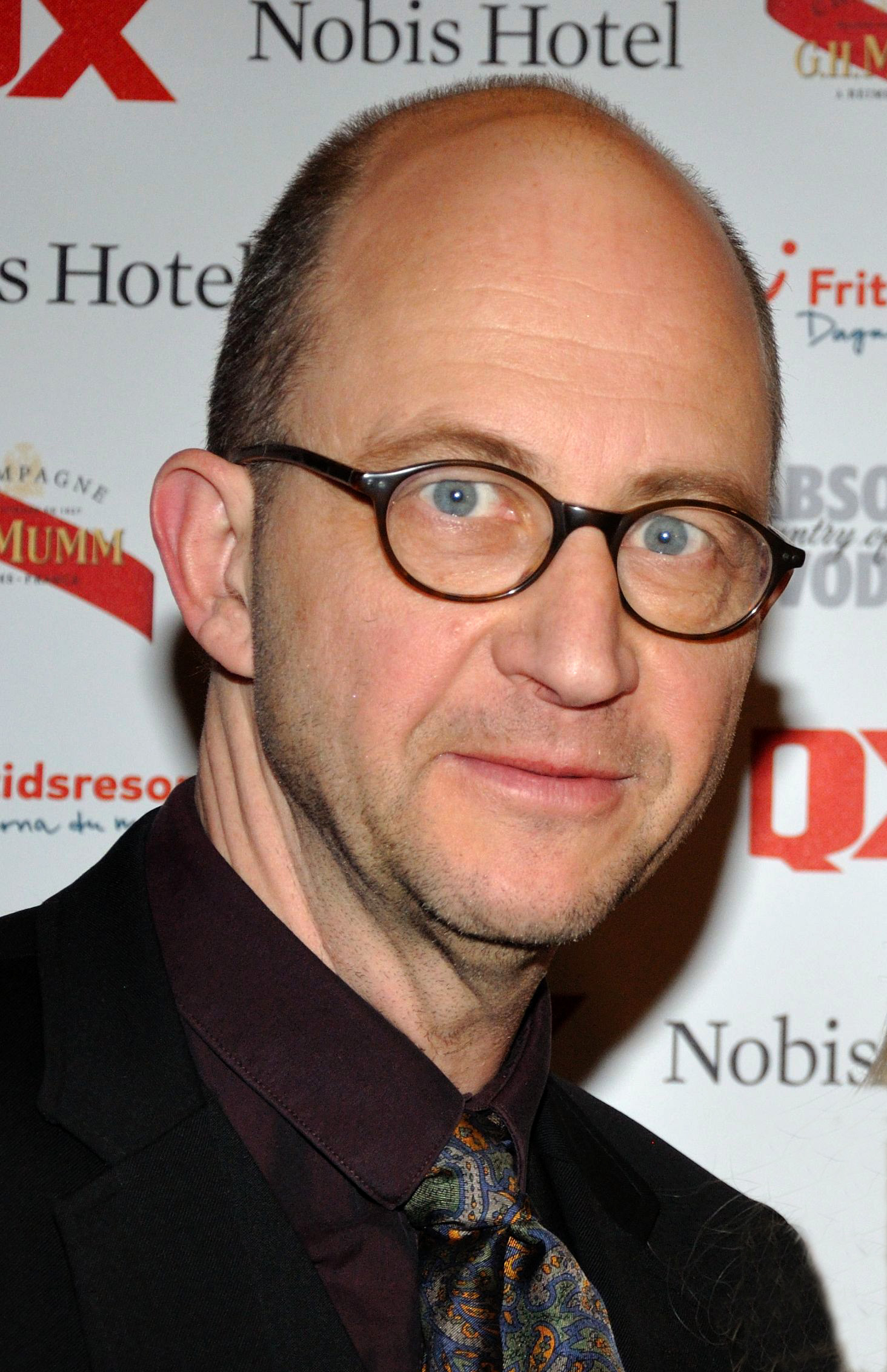
Per Naroskin

Per Naroskin (born 25 September 1959) is a Swedish psychologist, psychotherapist, author and stand-up comedian. Naroskin participated in different shows at Sveriges Radio, such as Studio Ett, Spanarna, and Jonas Val, and in 2006 he presented an episode of the SR show Sommar i P1 where he spoke about his life. He has also participated in the SVT show Fråga Doktorn.

Since 2011, he is in a relationship with comedian Sissela Kyle.

== Bibliography ==
- På spaning efter den vuxna människan (1995)
- Nyttan av att tala högt med sig själv (2002)
- Fuskaren som försvann (2012)
