= National Association for Women's Suffrage (Sweden) =

Suffrage movement in Sweden, 1902–1921

- Landsföreningen för kvinnans politiska rösträtt
- Formation: 1903
- Dissolved: 1921
- Type: Association
- Legal status: Defunct
- Purpose: Women Suffrage
- Headquarters: Stockholm
- Location: Sweden
- Methods: Agitation, campaigning

The National Association for Women's Suffrage (Swedish: Landsföreningen för kvinnans politiska rösträtt, LKPR) was a part of the general suffrage movement and the national society for women's suffrage in Sweden. It functioned as a parallel to the Sveriges allmänna rösträttsförbund (SARF; 'The Swedish League for Universal Suffrage') which was active mainly in acquiring full suffrage for males. The LKPR was a part of the International Woman Suffrage Alliance. It was active locally from 1902 as the Föreningen för kvinnans politiska rösträtt (Society for Woman Suffrage), and nationwide as the Landsföreningen för kvinnans politiska rösträtt (National Association for Women's Suffrage) from 1903 until 1921.

== History ==
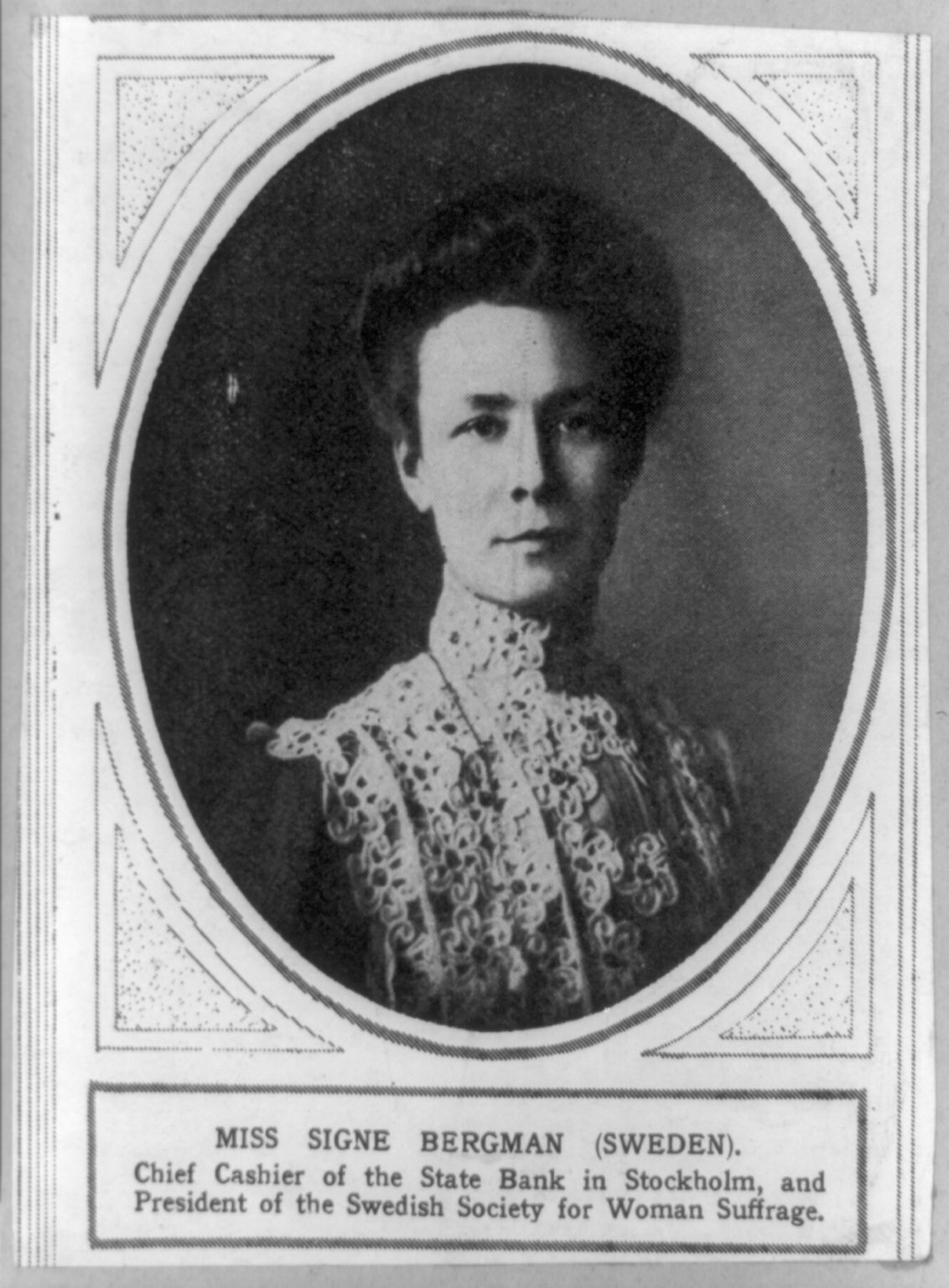
Signe Bergman, chairperson for the Swedish Society for Women's Suffrage in 1914–1917. She was referred to as the leader of the Women suffrage movement even when she was not formally chairman, and named by the press as the "Suffrage General".

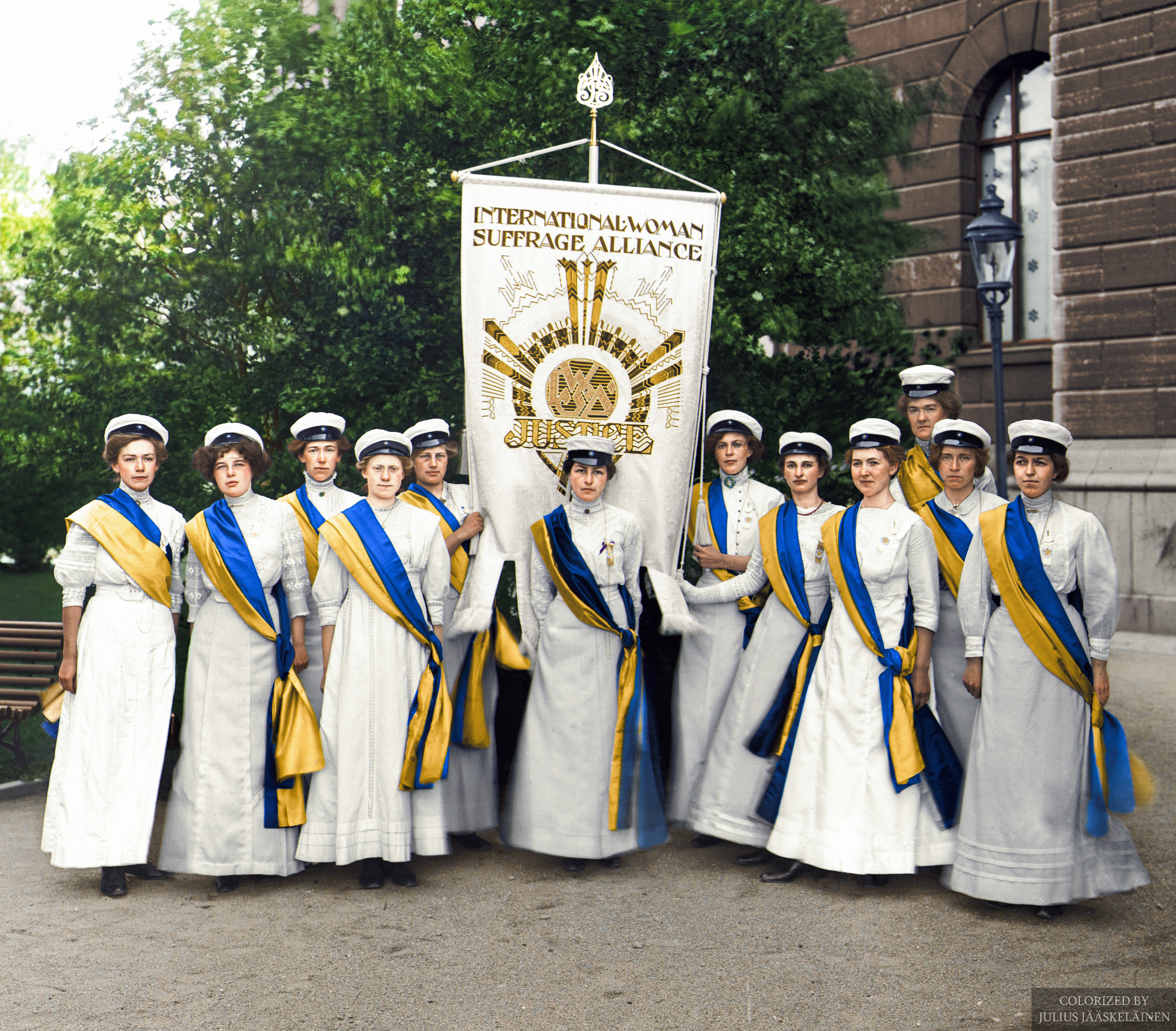
Colorized picture of Women from the Swedish National Association for Women's Suffrage (LKPR) (with graduation caps) in front of IWSA's (now IAW's) banner at the suffrage conference in Stockholm in 1911. Gold and white were the primary colors of the mainstream or liberal international women's suffrage movement, and had been used by American liberal suffragists since 1867

=== Background and foundation ===
In 1884, the first motion of women suffrage was presented to the Swedish parliament by Fredrik Borg. Borg presented his motion with the motivation that it would be just if women could vote in equal terms as men. This meant that taxpaying women of legal majority and a certain income should be allowed to vote on the national level, just as they already, since 1862, had the right to vote in municipal elections. The motion was voted down in the upper chamber with 53 votes against 44. The official main reason for rejection was that the women had not asked for such a right themselves. This demand was met in 1899, when Agda Montelius and Gertrud Adelborg as the representatives of Fredrika Bremer Association presented a demand for women's suffrage to the Prime Minister Erik Gustaf Boström. They were not given a reply.

In 1902, two motions regarding suffrage reform were presented to parliament. One was from the Minister for Justice Hjalmar Hammarskjöld, who suggested that married men be given two votes, as they could be regarded to vote in place of their wives as well. The other motion was presented by Carl Lindhagen, who suggested women suffrage. The Hammarskjöld suggestion aroused anger among women's rights activists, who formed a support group for the Lindhagen motion. One of the reasons for the formation of a women's support group was that the opponents to women suffrage used the fact that women suffrage was not a demand from the women themselves, and before the Lindhagen motion was voted down, the support group managed to hand over a list of 4,154 names from Stockholm and 1,487 from Gothenburg.

On 4 June 1902, Föreningen för Kvinnans Politiska Rösträtt (FKPR) was founded by among others Anna Whitlock, Lydia Wahlström and Signe Bergman. It was, however, still a local Stockholm society. The society sent out speakers to arrange local sections, and on New Year's Eve 1903, so many local sections had been founded that the name could be changed to Landsföreningen för kvinnans politiska rösträtt, that is to say a nationwide organisation.

=== Organisation and activism ===
==== Demands ====
The LKPR's official parole was that women should vote on the same terms as men. This phrase meant, that until full male suffrage was introduced in 1909, they demanded that taxpaying women of legal majority with an income, who already had the right to vote in municipal elections since the reform of 1862, should be allowed to vote also in national elections. After the full male suffrage of 1909, the same phrase automatically meant that they demanded the right for all women to vote. Until 1909, this had the effect that women with Socialist sympathies chose other women organisations.

The LKPR was not the only women organisation in Sweden that demanded women's suffrage. Also the Frisinnade kvinnor (Liberal Women), Vita bandet (Woman's Christian Temperance Union) as well as the Socialist women organisations (essentially the Women's Trade Union and the Stockholms allmänna kvinnoklubb and its local branches) demanded women's suffrage. However, the LKPR was different because it was the only organisation which had women's suffrage as its main task and focus, and it remained so until 1917, when a fraction of right-wing women formed the Moderata kvinnors rösträttsförening (The Society of Women's Suffrage of Moderate Women).

The LKPR also engaged in other issues, or regarded women's suffrage as a means to solve them. As only people of legal majority could vote, the demand for women's suffrage should eventually lead to the abolition of a man's legal guardianship over the married woman.

==== Organization ====
LKPR summoned representatives from their local sections to annual board meetings with the central board at a house on Lästmakargatan 6 in Stockholm. It was financed through the manufacturing of post cards and similar objects, the arranging of Flea markets and contributions from sympathisers. Among the most notable and important single financiers of the Swedish suffrage movement were Lotten von Kræmer and Martina Bergman-Österberg. The membership was for women only. The reason was that the main argument from the opposition for women's suffrage was that women did not want to vote themselves, and that it was seen as necessary to prove that women were capable of organising themselves politically and handle the responsibility that suffrage would give them as full citizens. There was, however, a male support group: Männens förening för kvinnans politiska rösträtt (The Male Society for Women's Suffrage) or MFKPR (1911).

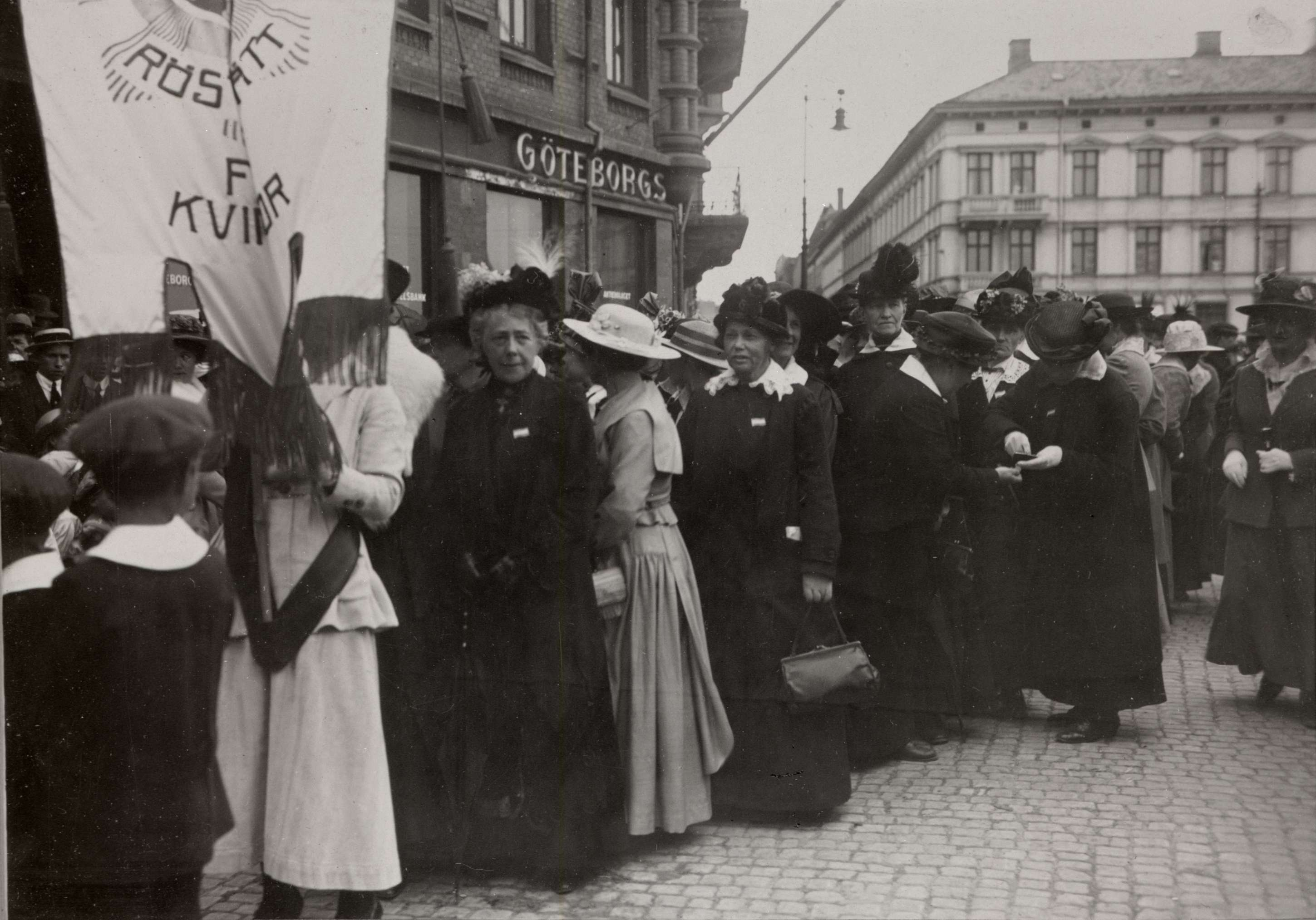
Women's suffrage demonstration in Gothenburg, June 1918.

==== Methods ====
The Swedish Society for Women's Suffrage regarded the more violent methods of the British Suffragettes to be non-constructive and did not wish to be associated with them, as they feared that this would erase all sympathy for the issue. Only one street demonstration was ever organised by the society. After a motion of women's suffrage was voted down in 1918, the participants marched with three banners representing people without the right to vote. The first banner showed a male criminal in prison; the second a male patient in a mental hospital; and the third banner the respected author Selma Lagerlöf, member of the Royal Swedish Academy. This demonstration was organized by Frigga Carlberg of the Gothenburg section, which was the most radical of the sections. It was also Carlberg who once invited Sylvia Pankhurst as a speaker. These were exceptions.

The general media image of the women demanding women's suffrage was a non-feminine, masculine and homosexual woman. Because of this, the Swedish Society for Women's Suffrage thought it wise to reject this prejudice by recommending their members to try to dress femininely during their activism.

The LKPR primarily used the method of building opinion by using the press, making public speeches, handing out leaflets and by applying pressure on politicians and decision makers. The Bergman-Österbergska samhällskurserna (Bergman-Österberg Citizen Courses), financed by Martina Bergman Österberg, informed women of their rights and prepared them for a future as political voters, and they published their own paper, Rösträtt för kvinnor (Women's Suffrage) in 1912–1919.

==== Political affiliations ====
The LKPR was formally a politically neutral organisation. The society was chaired by Lydia Wahlström (conservative), Signe Bergman (social democrat), teacher Anna Whitlock and Ann-Margret Holmgren (liberal). It was supported by women with both left- and right-wing political sympathies. In practice, the political neutrality was abandoned by the resolution of 20 June 1911, when the LKPR decided to form a voters' boycott against all politicians opposing women's suffrage and support those in favor. In reality, this meant that the organization was no longer politically neutral, as the main opposition of women's suffrage was the Conservatives, while Liberals and the Social Democrats were in favor of women's suffrage as soon as full male suffrage had been introduced, which had been made in 1909.

==== Members and support ====
Several noted women participated with their support. Selma Lagerlöf was an important speaker, because of the general respect she was given in all parts of society. Lagerlöf was deeply involved with the Swedish suffrage movement and spoke whenever she was asked to, and she was a well known representative for it. Ellen Key was also involved, but more frequently ridiculed in the press. Elin Wägner was from 1909 one of the most active supporters. She participated in plays in the parts of Jenny Lind and Fredrika Bremer, and her novel Pennskaftet (novel) (1910), which spoke for love without marriage, became a controversial success in all society and referred to as the "bible of the Swedish suffrage movement".

=== Actions ===
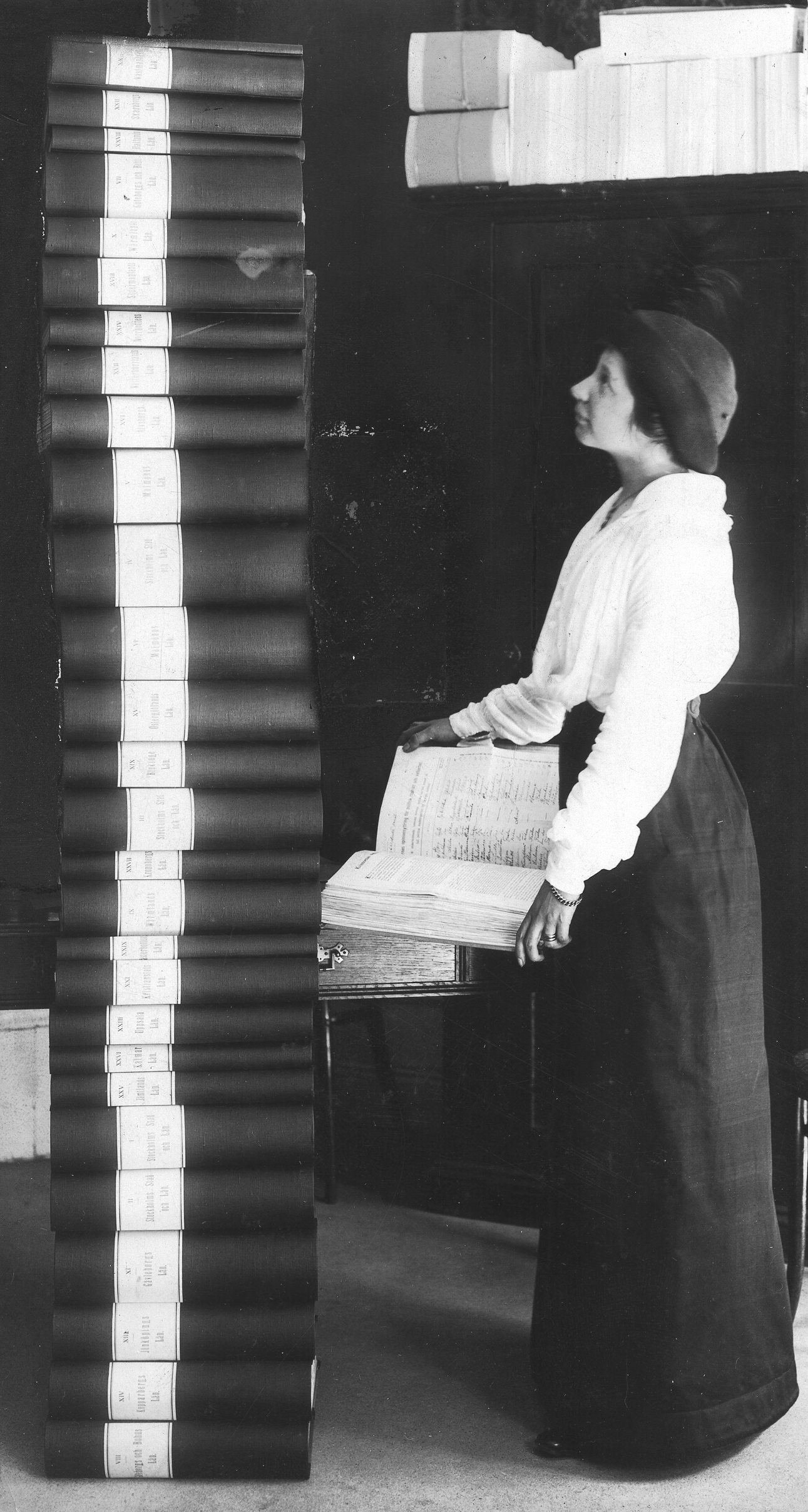
Elin Wägner and the result of the collection of names in favor of women suffrage in 1914

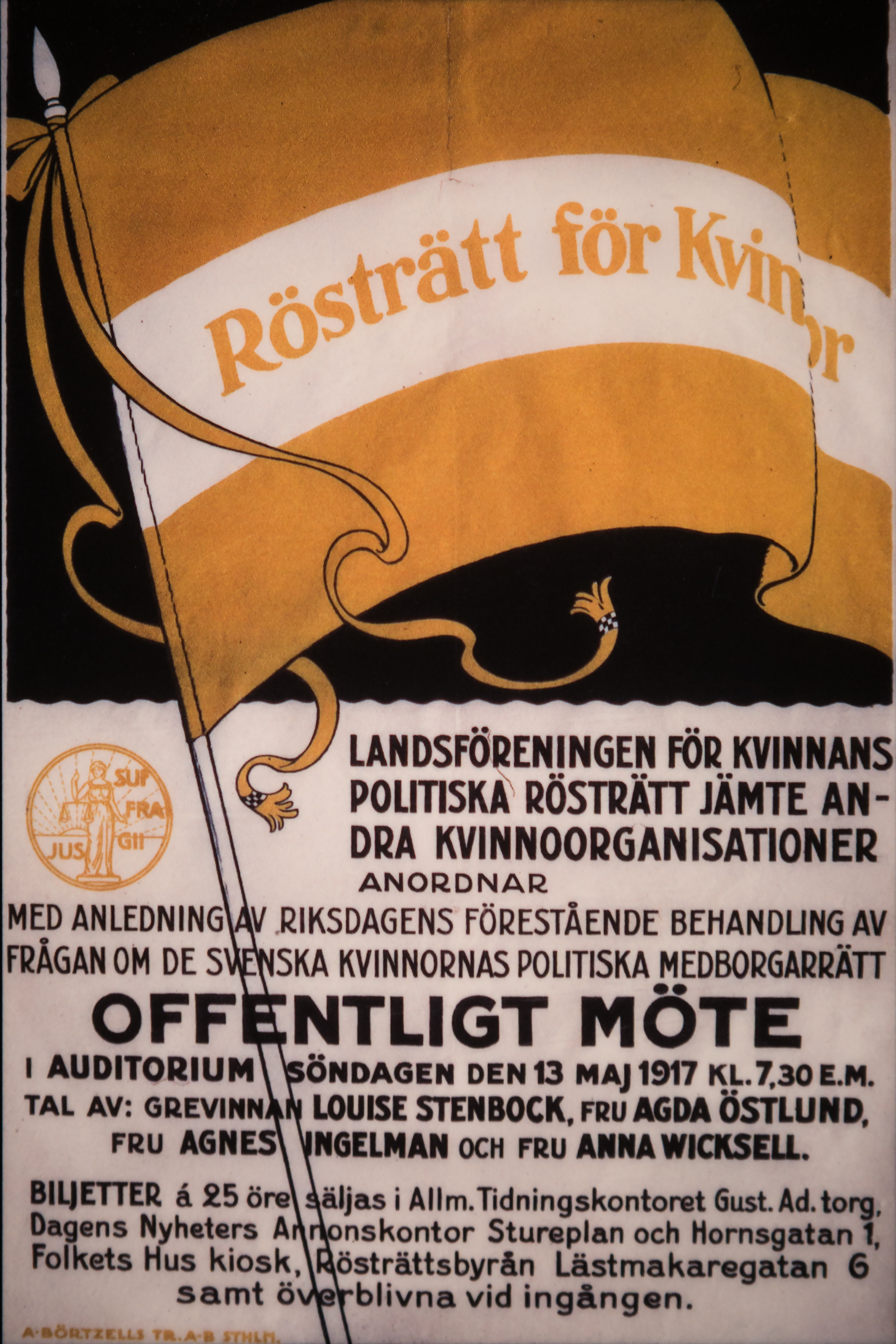
Poster for a suffrage meeting.

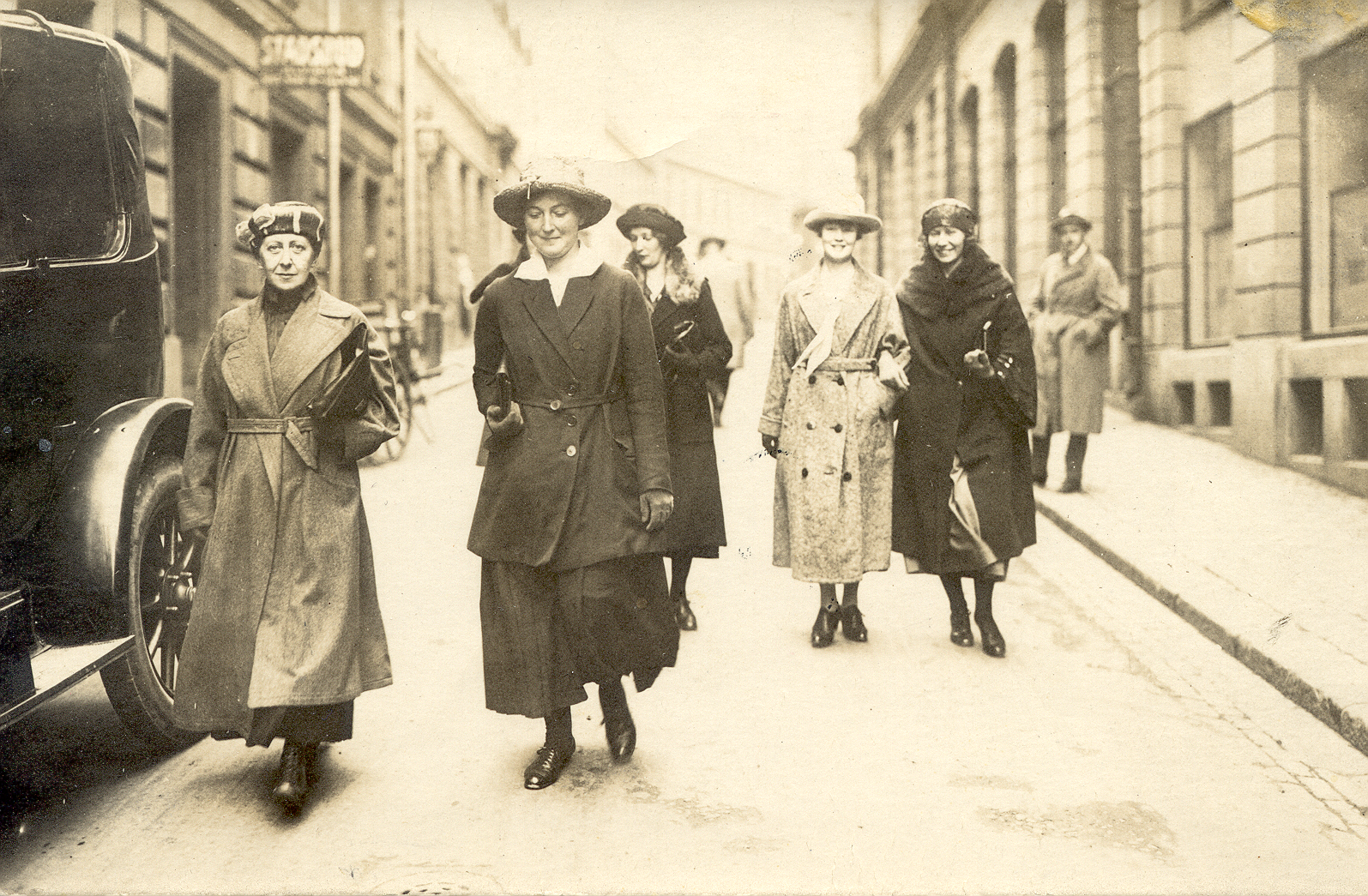
Women on their way to vote in the 1921 election.

==== 1905-1911 ====
In 1905, the LKPR presented its demands to the liberal government of Karl Staaff, who answered them that women suffrage should be introduced as soon as full male suffrage, which had to come first.

The government arranged for an investigation of the reform, which was scheduled to present its result after a period of six years. In 1907, the Conservative government under Arvid Lindman refused to touch the question by referring to this investigation. The LKPR sent a delegation under Gertrud Adelborg to King Oscar II of Sweden, who promised his support.

==== 1911 and the international congress ====
The Sixth Conference of the International Woman Suffrage Alliance in Stockholm in June 1911, has sometimes been referred to as the greatest triumph of the LKPR. Many international speakers were present, among them Anna Shaw, Rosika Schwimmer and Carrie Chapman Catt. Selma Lagerlöf was a speaker on the Royal Swedish Opera and Ellen Key at Skansen. The congress was celebrated with a great parade through Stockholm, who stopped to greet its greatest benefactor, Lotten von Kræmer, on her balcony.

The congress was given great media coverage. In connection to this, the male support group was founded who counted Carl Lindhagen, Ernst Beckman, Knut Wicksell, Mauritz Hellberg and Henrik Petrini among its members.

==== 1912-1914 ====
In 1912, Karl Staff presented a motion of women's suffrage, which was voted down by the Conservatives, while the Liberals and Social Democrats voted yes.

Staff encouraged LKPR to present a support list to Parliament to silence the argument that women did not ask to vote themselves. In 1913, the LKPR could present a list of 360,000 names of women who supported women's suffrage.

==== 1914-1917: war and pacificsm ====
During World War I, the LKPR took the initiative for a peace organisation formed by women of the neutral countries with the aim to form pressure on the neutral governments to act as mediators between the warring parties.

The Peace Movement was formed by the LKPR with members also from Fredrika Bremer Association, KFUK, the Social Democratic women's organisations (the Stockholms allmänna kvinnoklubb and its local branches) among others, with Anna Whitlock, Emilia Broomé and Kerstin Hesselgren as leading members. A great peace manifestation was to take place 19 February 1915 organized by the Swedish women with support and participation also from the women of Denmark and Norway.

On 18 February, however, Agda Montelius was called to the Queen, Victoria of Baden, who demanded a stop to "the foolish presumption of women" to be involved in politics. King Gustav V of Sweden interrupted and said that women were of course entitled to present demands to the government, but that the situation made it difficult, and referred to the Minister of Foreign Affairs, who warned them that such an action could damage Swedish neutrality.

The action was therefore silenced in both Sweden, Denmark and Norway, and the women involved placed the blame on Victoria of Baden. The Swedish Peace Movement did, however, send 16 delegates to the Women at the Hague peace congress in the Hague in April 1915.

==== 1917-1918 ====
In 1917 the LKPR wished to exploit the revolutionary atmosphere by presenting Prime Minister Carl Swartz with a demand for women's suffrage. Several motions in favor of woman suffrage were presented in parliament, but were all voted down.

After the elections of 1917, the Conservatives were defeated by the Liberals and Social Democrats. Thereby, there was a majority in the Swedish parliament in favor of women's suffrage, and the LKPR reminded the parties to the left of their old promise to introduce women's suffrage as soon as full suffrage had been granted to men.

In February 1918, the Government hold to its promise by presenting a bill on women's suffrage. It was approved in the second chamber by 149 to 49 but voted down in the first chamber with 62 to 36. LKPR organized a public protest meeting on Gärdet in Stockholm with the Liberal Gulli Petrini and the Social Democrat Ruth Gustafson as speakers, and the only street demonstration ever organized by the LKPR was arranged by Frigga Carlberg in Gothenburg.

==== 1919-1921: Victory ====
After the end of the World War I, the Government introduced its sweeping democratic reform program, which included women's suffrage. Women's suffrage was approved in parliament on 24 May 1919, and confirmed by both the Lower and Upper Chamber of Parliament on 26 January 1921.

Between the passing of the suffrage in 1919 and the Election of 1921, the Justice Department formed a state committee to reform women's legal status, which would be necessary before they could use their suffrage. This included a new marriage law and legal majority for married women (as they would not be able to use their suffrage if they continued to be minors), as well as a law granting women equal access to all state offices (formally passed with the Competence Law of 1923). The committee included Mathilda Staël von Holstein among its members, and was chaired by Emilia Broomé, the first time in history a state committee was headed by a woman.

The LKPR celebrated the victory on 29 May 1919 and arranged a party with music by Elfrida Andrée and a speech by Selma Lagerlöf. Delegations from Denmark and Norway were received, and a delegation was sent to the Social Democratic Women, who also worked for women's suffrage, which was answered by a deputation led by Anna Lindhagen. It was followed by a meeting at Skansen with Lydia Wahlström, Ruth Gustafson, Alexandra Skoglund and Ellen Hagen as speakers.

==== 1921: Dissolution ====
After its goal was achieved, the LKPR was dissolved. The conviction was, that as women had now finally achieved equal political rights as men, they should join the political parties and work through them equally with men.

On 29 March 1921, the 18th and last Congress of the National Association for Women's Suffrage was held in Stockholm. It was proposed that the LKPR should be incorporated in to the Svenska Kvinnors Medborgarförbund (SKM) ('Citizen Society of Swedish Women'), which had been founded the same month in order to support and enforce the newly acquired citizen rights of women. In the end however, the decision was to dissolve the LKPR and transform it in to the Svenska kommittén för internationellt rösträttsarbete (SKIR) ('Swedish Comitté for International Suffrage') under the leadership of Anna Bugge-Wicksell, with the task to maintain the international contacts of the LKPR and its archives until it could be incorporated in to the SKM (the SKIR lasted until 1930).

After this, the chairperson declared the LKPR dissolved, "and declared that it was with some sadness, after all these years of gatherings for higher purpose and the founding of friendships around an ideal work". The following dinner at the Grand Hotel Royal was described:

"During the happy and festive occasion, one speech followed the next. Thanks and celebration were given to all who had led the work, particularly "the two mothers of the suffrage movement", mrs Ann-Margret Holmgren and miss Anna Whitlock. Also noted were mrs Anna Wicksell, as the first [Swedish] woman in world politics, the present members of the central comitte, to the first fighters which are not longer with us, etc. Telegrams arrived both from within the country as well as from abroad, and were read".

Many members joined the Fredrika Bremer Association or the Svenska Kvinnors Medborgarförbund ('Citizen Society of Swedish Women'), while 50 members of the former central committee became members of the SKIR.

== Chairman ==
- 1903–1907: Anna Whitlock (first term)
- 1907–1911: Lydia Wahlström
- 1911–1914: Anna Whitlock (second term)
- 1914–1917: Signe Bergman
- 1918–1921: Karolina Widerström

== See also ==
- List of suffragists and suffragettes
- List of Swedish suffragists and suffragettes
- List of women's rights activists
- Timeline of women's suffrage
- Women's suffrage organizations

== Sources ==
- Hedvall, Barbro (2011). Vår rättmätiga plats: om kvinnornas kamp för rösträtt [Our Rightful Place. About women's struggle for suffrage] (in Swedish). Stockholm: Bonnier fakta. ISBN 9789174241198. SELIBR 12141988.
