= Kopps =

- Swedish cover
- Directed by: Josef Fares
- Screenplay by: Josef Fares; Mikael Håfström; Lars Yngve Johansson; Fares Fares; Torkel Petersson
- Produced by: Anna Anthony
- Starring: Fares Fares; Torkel Petersson; Göran Ragnerstam; Sissela Kyle
- Cinematography: Aril Wretblad
- Distributed by: Sonet Film AB
- Release date: 7 February 2003 (Sweden)
- Running time: 90 minutes
- Country: Sweden
- Language: Swedish

Kopps is a 2003 Swedish action comedy film which was released to cinemas in Sweden on 7 February 2003, directed by Josef Fares. The name itself is a pun on pronouncing the English word "Cops" with a Swedish accent.

== Plot ==
The film concerns the police force of a small fictional Swedish village, Högboträsk. The village is so peaceful that crime has become nonexistent. The police spend their shifts drinking coffee, eating hot dogs and chasing down runaway cows. This is all well and good for the village's own police, but the police management board wants to discontinue the local police force for lack of crime. This would mean the loss of income for the policemen, so they begin to stage crimes in order to preserve their jobs. This includes burning down the local hotdog stand, hiring a drunk to steal a packet of sausages, thrashing a local car, faking a shootout and staging a kidnapping using their friends as actors.

== Cast ==
- Fares Fares – Jacob
- Torkel Petersson – Benny
- Göran Ragnerstam – Lasse
- Sissela Kyle – Agneta
- Eva Röse – Jessica Lindblad
- Christian Fiedler – Folke
- Erik Ahrnbom – Håkan
- Harry Goldstein – Göran
- Michael Fares – Mike
- Viktor Friberg – Janne
- Jan Fares – Mike's father
- Yngve Dahlberg – Gunnar
- Kerstin Hellström – Kindergarten teacher

== American remake ==
Shortly after Kopps' release in 2003, Adam Sandler and Columbia Pictures bought the rights and announced their plans to remake the comedy into an English-language release, but the project did not materialise.

== See also ==
- Super Troopers
- Parable of the broken window
