= Fröken Frimans krig =

Swedish drama TV-series

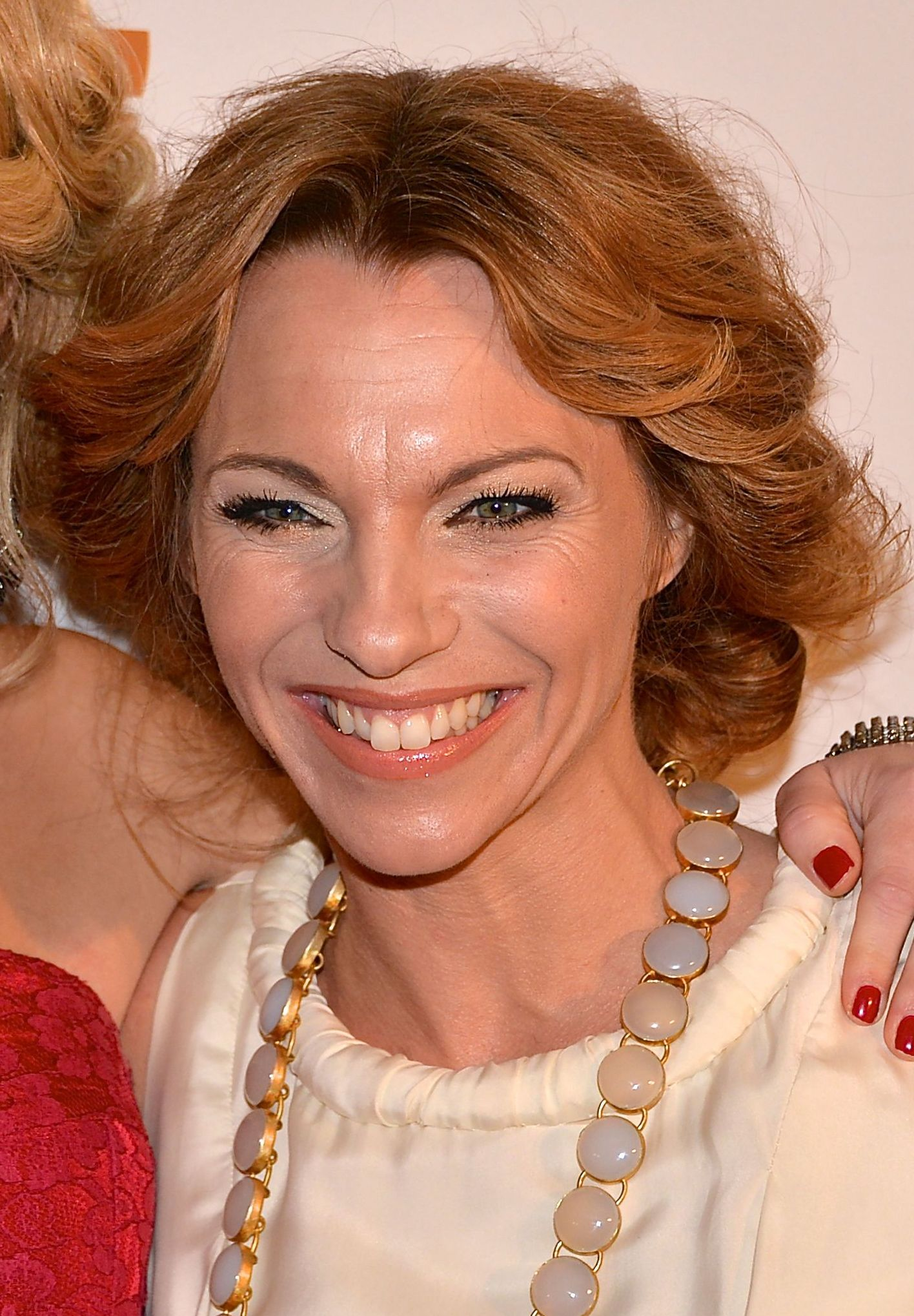
- Sofia Ledarp on Guldbaggegalan 21 January 2013 at Cirkus in Stockholm.
- Genre: Drama
- Starring: Sissela Kyle, Sofia Ledarp, Frida Hallgren
- Country of origin: Sweden
- No. of seasons: 4
- No. of episodes: 12

Original release
- Network: SVT
- Release: December 2013 – December 2017

Fröken Frimans krig ("Miss Friman's War") is a Swedish drama television series that first aired on SVT in December 2013 for three episodes during the Christmas and New Year’s weekend. Sissela Kyle plays women's rights advocate Dagmar Friman, a fictitious version of Anna Whitlock, who in 1905 founded the consumer cooperative Svenska hem. The series is written by Pernilla Oljelund, and is based partly on the book Svenska Hem – en passionerad affär (2005) by Monika Björk and Eva Kaijser. Following the success of the series, the book was re-released in 2013 under the name Svenska Hem – Den sanna historien om Fröken Frimans krig. Fröken Frimans krig is directed by Mikael Hellström and produced by Maria Nordenberg. A second season aired in December 2015, again for the Christmas and New Year’s weekend, with three more episodes. A third season aired in December 2016, and the fourth season aired in December 2017, with three more episodes each.

The series has been aired in Iran, Mexico, and Slovenia as of December 2015.

== Roles ==
- Sissela Kyle – Dagmar Friman
- Sofia Ledarp – Kinna Boman
- Frida Hallgren – Lottie Friman
- Maria Kulle – Emmy
- Lena T Hansson – Alma
- Emelie Wallberg – Tora Nilsson
- Kristoffer Berglund – Jon Oskarsson
- Gustaf Hammarsten – Axel Friman
- Ulla Skoog – Rut
- Allan Svensson – Frithiof Johannesson
- Emil Almén – Egon
- Suzanne Ernrup – Fru Zander
- Rolf Lassgård – Ruben Lehmann
- Edvin Ryding – Gunnar
- Nicole Gutniak – Ina
- Ann-Charlotte Franzén – Barnavårdskvinnan
- Henrik Norlén – Anders Lithner
- Sofia Rönnegård – Jungfru
- Douglas Johansson – Hennings doctor
- Per Svensson – Mauritz Collin
- Anders Johannisson – Fastighetsskötare
- Johannes Wanselow – Nordlund
- Claes Hartelius – Tore Berger
- Peter Carlberg – Veterinär
- Tobias Aspelin – Förrättare
- Erik Johansson – DN-redaktör
- Michael Petersson – Herr Nettelman
- Richard Ohlsson – Springpojken Kalle
- Magnus Krepper - Ernst Recke

== Criticism and fiction ==
In the Sveriges Radio show Vetenskapsradion Historia (aired 8 May 2014), historian Anita du Rietz stated that the series inaccurately portrays the situation of women during the early 1900s, and also misrepresents the work of Anna Whitlock. According to du Rietz, women's working situation at the time was much better than what is shown in the series.
