= Suzanne Ernrup =

Swedish actress

Suzanne Marie Ernrup (born 30 November 1954 in Stockholm) is a Swedish actress. She studied at Gothenburg Theatre Academy 1978–81. She is married to the actor Anders Sundquist and they have a daughter called Hedvig.

== Selected filmography ==
- 1981 – Tuppen
- 1984 – Åke and His World
- 1985 – Lösa förbindelser (TV)
- 1987 – Hip hip hurra!
- 1987 – Varuhuset (TV)
- 1989 – Hassel – Offren
- 1992 – Jönssonligan och den svarta diamanten
- 1992 – Sunday's Children
- 1992 – Rederiet (TV)
- 1994–95 – Du bestämmer (TV)
- 1995 – Snoken (TV)
- 1997 – Pelle Svanslös (TV ("Julkalendern"))
- 1997 – Skilda världar (TV)
- 2001 – Pusselbitar (TV)
- 2002 – Bella – bland kryddor och kriminella (TV)
- 2007 – En riktig jul (TV ("Julkalendern"))
- 2008 – LasseMajas detektivbyrå – Kameleontens hämnd
- 2013 – - Fröken Frimans krig
