= Tobias Aspelin =

Swedish actor

Joakim Tobias Aspelin (born 29 November 1968 in Lund) is a Swedish actor.

== Selected filmography ==
- 2009 - Beck – I stormens öga
- 2009 - Wallander – Prästen
- 2008 - Oskyldigt dömd (TV)
- 2007 - Den nya människan
- 2005 - Carambole
- 2005 - Krama mig
- 2001 - Familjehemligheter
- 2000 - Nya tider (TV)
- 2013 - Fröken Frimans krig (TV)
