= Ina Almén =

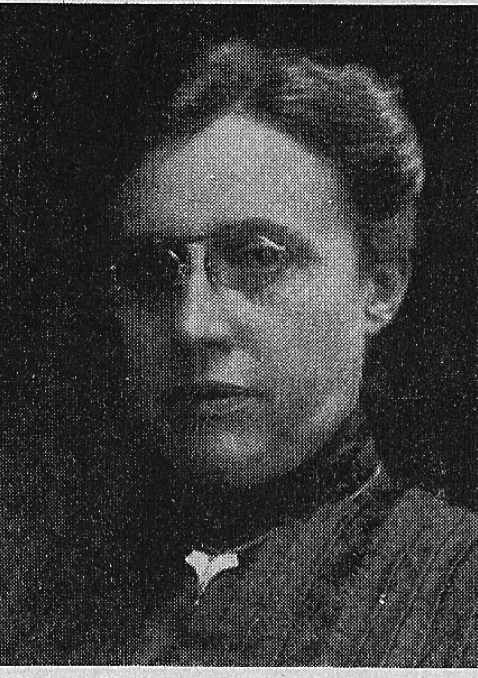
Kristina Almen

Kristina "Ina" Maria Almén (1863-1938), was a Swedish businessperson.

She was born to Professor August Almén and Sanna Fries. She never married.

She was educated at the Konstfack. She was employed as a draughts artist at the art and crafts firm of Selma Giöbel, and at the P.A. Norstedt & Söner publishing house.

She was the co-founder of Kvinnornas Andelsförening Svenska Hem with Anna Whitlock, and was its first managing director in 1905-1910.

She was a member of Nya Idun from 1902, and elected a member of the Idun Female Academy in 1918.
