= Oskyldigt dömd =

Swedish television series

- Created by: Johan Zollitsch; Jan Arnald; Inger Scharis; Karin Gidfors; Hans Rosenfeldt; Richard Holm; Molly Hartleb
- Starring: Mikael Persbrandt; Helena af Sandeberg; Marie Richardson; Sofia Ledarp
- Country of origin: Sweden
- No. of episodes: 24

Production
- Running time: approx. 45 minutes

Original release
- Network: TV4
- Release: 24 September 2008 – 16 December 2009

Oskyldigt dömd (English title: Verdict Revised) is a Swedish drama television series screened in 2008 and 2009. The first season was recorded in twelve episodes during February 2008 to be aired later during the fall. It premiered on the Finnish TV channel FST5 on 24 September 2008 and later the same evening on Swedish TV4. The series is produced by Filmlance. On 23 January TV4 announced that Mikael Persbrandt would be playing the main character and on 10 February other cast members were announced; Helena af Sandeberg, Sofia Ledarp, Marie Richardson and Mirja Turestedt. TV4 also announced that they had started to work on the second season before the first had even been aired., the first season was written by Johan Zollitsch, Jan Arnald, Karin Gidfors and Hans Rosenfeldt and the second one by Thomas Borgström and Sara Heldt. Filming the second season took place during spring 2009. TV4 refused to say how much money the filming has cost the channel, but they confirm that "a lot of money" has been used.

== Plot ==
Markus Haglund (Mikael Persbrandt) is a controversial professor of criminal law who fights for those who have been innocently convicted. Along with his four law students, Fia Jönsson (Sofia Ledarp), Anna Sjöstedt (Helena af Sandeberg), Belal Al-Mukhtar (Francisco Sobrado) and Roger Andersson (Leonard Terfelt), he helps the convicted fight for their innocence.

At Uppsala University, he leads a class called "Oskyldigt dömd" ("innocently convicted").

== Cast ==
Character	Actor/Actress
Markus Haglund	Mikael Persbrandt
Fia Jönsson	Sofia Ledarp
Anna Sjöstedt	Helena af Sandeberg
Belal Al-Mukhtar	Francisco Sobrado
Roger Andersson	Leonard Terfelt
Tomas Thomén	Magnus Mark
Ulrika Stiegler	Marie Richardson
Caroline Gustavsson	Anja Lundqvist
Jannike Storm	Susanne Barklund
Henrik Edin	Jamil Drissi
Tomas Storm	Johan Hedenberg
Daughter	Kim Jansson
Christian	Peter Järn
Li-Anne Persson	Franceska Löfgren
Robert Ekelund	Peter Schildt
Håkan Malm	Douglas Johansson
Kenneth Strömberg	Bengt Järnblad
Peter Berglin	Tobias Aspelin
Andreas Bergstedt	Reuben Sallmander
Svante	Erik Johansson
Nikki	Moa Gammel
Johannes	Peter Viitanen
Jens Renström	Johan H:son Kjellgren
Johnny Jönsson	Allan Svensson
Liselott Jönsson	Ing-Marie Carlsson
Fredrik Johnsson	Thomas Hedengran
Annika Hallin	Jessica Zandén
Alf Fransson	Niklas Falk
Jesper	Måns Nathanaelson
Leif Persson	Leif Andrée
Carina Persson	Malin Morgan

== Episodes ==
=== Season 1 ===
#	Date Aired on TV4	Official Ratings
01 - 01	24 September 2008	1,210,000
01 - 02	1 October 2008	975 000
01 - 03	8 October 2008	955 000
01 - 04	15 October 2008	955 000
01 - 05	22 October 2008	855 000
01 - 06	29 October 2008	790 000
01 - 07	5 November 2008	815 000
01 - 08	12 November 2008	790 000
01 - 09	19 November 2008	845 000
01 - 10	26 November 2008	820 000
01 - 11	3 December 2008	860 000
01 - 12	10 December 2008	705 000

=== Season 2 ===
#	Date Aired on TV4	Official Ratings
02 - 01	30 September 2009	720 000
02 - 02	7 October 2009	645 000
02 - 03	14 October 2009	512 000
02 - 04	21 October 2009	616 000
02 - 05	28 October 2009	660 000
02 - 06	4 November 2009	525 000
02 - 07	11 November 2009	595 000
02 - 08	18 November 2009	447 000
02 - 09	25 November 2009	638 000
02 - 10	2 December 2009	626 000
02 - 11	9 December 2009	655 000
02 - 12	16 December 2009	850 000
