= Sofia Ledarp =

Swedish actress (born 1974)

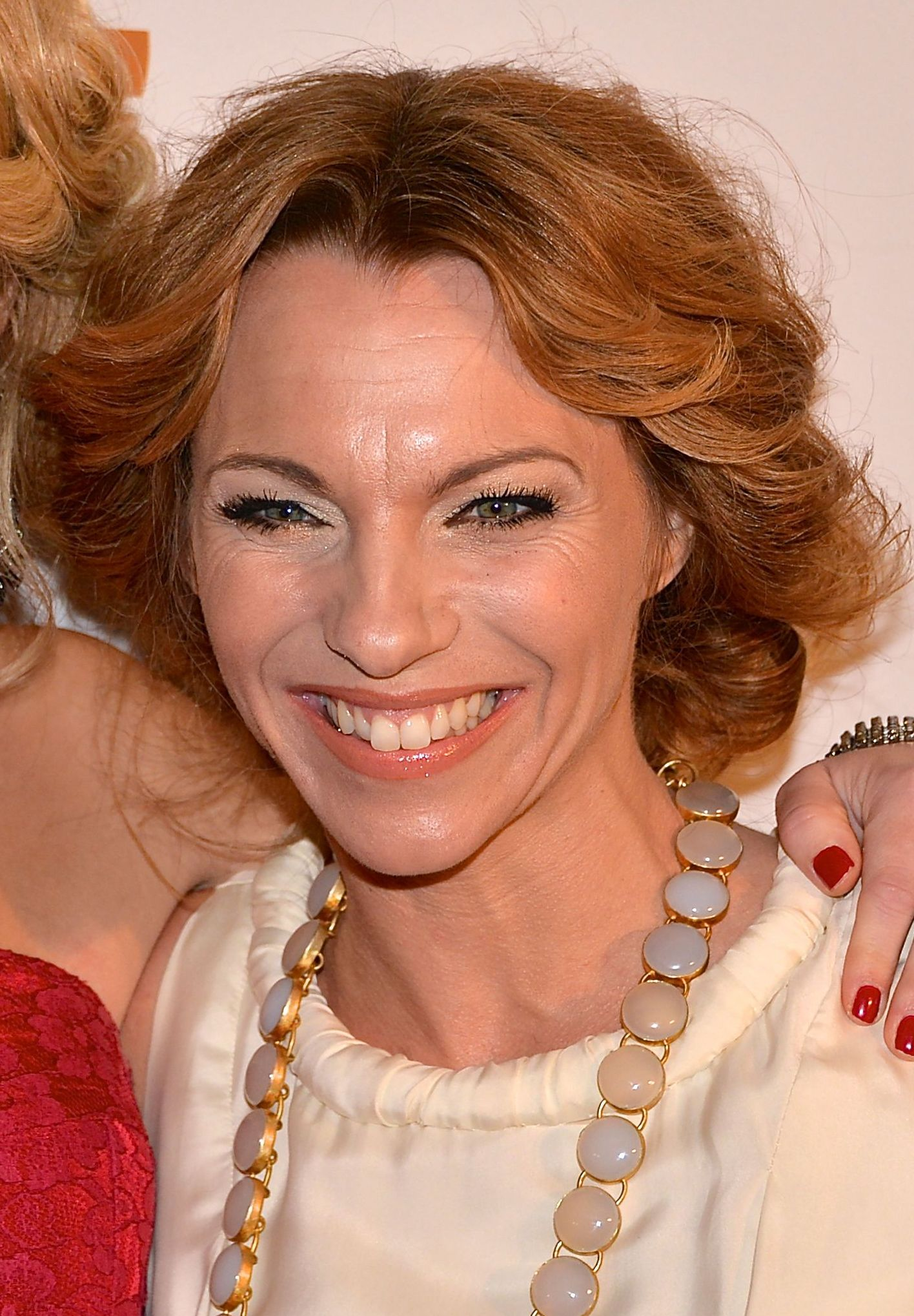
- Ledarp in 2013
- Born: Sofia Marianne Papadimitriou; 8 April 1974 (age 52); Stockholm, Sweden
- Education: Luleå Theatre Academy
- Occupation: Actress
- Years active: 2004–present
- Partners: Erik Molberg Hansen; Tobias Norenstedt (2013–present)
- Children: 2

Sofia Marianne Papadimitriou Ledarp (born 8 April 1974) is a Swedish actress. Born in the Stockholm suburb Hägersten, she studied at Luleå Theatre Academy 1996–2000. In January 2008, she received the Guldsolen and Guldbagge Awards for her role as Lena in the 2007 film Den man älskar. She is best known internationally for her role as Malin Erikson in the Millennium movies.

== Selected filmography ==
- 2004 - Om Stig Petrés hemlighet (TV)
- 2005 - Medicinmannen (TV)
- 2006 - Varannan vecka
- 2008 - Häxdansen (TV)
- 2008 - Oskyldigt dömd (TV)
- 2008 - Vi hade i alla fall tur med vädret – igen
- 2009 - The Girl with the Dragon Tattoo
- 2009 - Guds tre flickor
- 2009 - The Girl Who Played with Fire
- 2009 - The Girl Who Kicked the Hornets' Nest
- 2011 - Försvunnen
- 2012 - Hinsehäxan (TV)
- 2012 - Cockpit
- 2013 - Fröken Frimans krig (TV)
- 2014 - Blå Ögon (TV)
- 2015 - Glada hälsningar från Missångerträsk
- 2015 - Fröken Frimans krig (TV)
- 2025 - Åremorden (TV)
