= Cederström =

Swedish surname

Cederström is a Swedish surname. Notable people with the surname include:

- Gustaf Cederström, Swedish painter
- Carl Gustav Cederström, Swedish pilot
- Jacob Cederström (1817–1833), Gotland Governor in Sweden
- Carl Cederström (1766–1781), Dalarna Governor in Sweden
- Sven Cederström (1769–1775), Älvsborg County
- Rudolf Cederström, Swedish admiral, acting Over-Governor of Stockholm (1816–1818)
- Bror Cederström (1775–1785) Österbotten County
- Gustaf Albrekt Bror Cederström (d. 1877)
- Bror Cederström (1780–1877), Minister for Defence in Sweden
- Gary Cederstrom (born 1955), American baseball umpire
