= Sissela Kyle =

Swedish actress & comedian (born 1957)

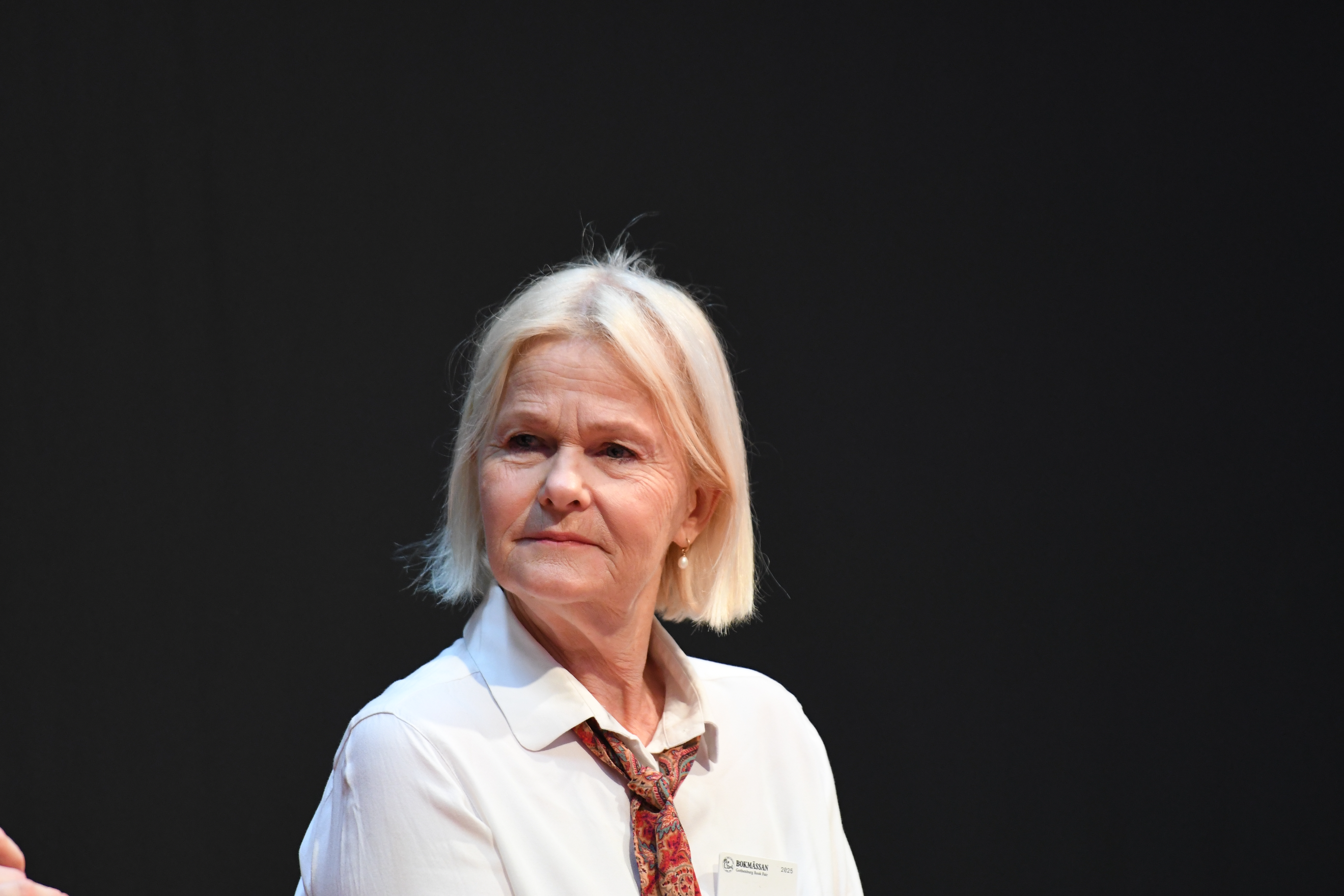
- Kyle in 2025
- Born: Sissela Maria Kyle; 17 March 1957 (age 69); Gothenburg, Sweden
- Occupations: Actress, comedian
- Years active: 1982–present
- Spouse: Mårten Eriksson (m. 1987; div. 1998)
- Partner: Per Naroskin (2011–present)
- Children: 2 (with Eriksson)

Sissela Maria Kyle (born 17 March 1957) is a Swedish actress, theater director and comedian.

== Biography ==
=== Early life ===
Sissela Kyle is the daughter of Per Gunnar Kyle and Gunnhild Kyle née Karlson (1921-2016). She grew up in Partille outside of Gothenburg.

During her upbringing she was very interested in theater, and became part of a theater group in Gothenburg. After moving away from home in 1976 she started to work as a teacher temp and in 1978 she was accepted in to the Theater School of Stockholm. She studied in the same class as Peter Stormare, Jessica Zandén, Maria Johansson and Tomas Norström.

=== Career ===
Kyle has appeared in numerous theater productions, for several theaters like the Stockholm City Theatre, Royal Dramatic Theatre, Boulevardteatern and Hamburger Börs. She early on established herself as a comedian, but also did serious roles in the theater productions Revisorn (1990) and Onkel Vanja (1994).

Kyle has also appeared in numerous television series like Skärgårdsdoktorn broadcast on SVT, Tjat om mat, Pistvakt, and as a comedian in the comedy show Parlamentet which is broadcast on TV4. She has appeared in the Sveriges Radio show Spanarna several times over the years.

Kyle has also presented her own episode of Sommar i P1 on Sveriges Radio telling about her life in 1994, 2000, 2005 and 2019. Kyle has presented the annual film gala Guldbaggen several times.

Kyle has acted in films like Livet är en schlager (2000) and the comedy film Kopps (2003).

In 2011, Kyle made her debut as director for theater when she directed Alan Ayckbourn's Vänner (Absent Friends) at the Stockholm City Theatre. She has also directed Carin Mannheimer's I sista minuten and Chris Lee's Det kan du drömma om Hilda, also at the Stockholm City Theatre.

In later years she has had a leading role in the SVT drama series Fröken Frimans krig as Dagmar Friman.

== Personal life ==
Since 2011, she is in a relationship with Per Naroskin.

Kyle has been awarded the Guldmasken for her work in theater for her work five times.

== Filmography ==
- 1983 – Limpan
- 1985 – Lösa förbindelser
- 1988 – Liv i luckan
- 1999 – Dödlig drift
- 2000 – Naken
- 2000 – Livet är en schlager
- 2001 – Familjehemligheter
- 2003 – Kopps
- 2003 – Håkan Bråkan
- 2004 – Eurovision Song Contest 2004 (In the sketch ABBA: The Last Video)
- 2004 – Miss Sweden
- 2004 – Bombay Dreams
- 2005 – Fyra veckor i juni
- 2006 – Min frus förste älskare
- 2007 – Hjälp!
- 2007 – En riktig jul
- 2007 – Sisselak
- 2013 – Crimes of Passion
- 2013 – Fröken Frimans krig
