= Carl Lindhagen =

Swedish lawyer, politician and pacifist

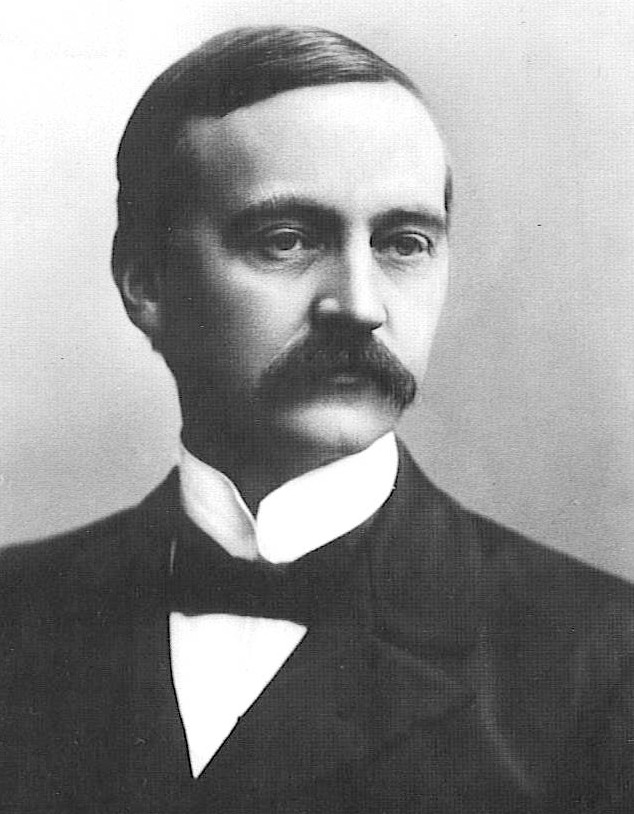
Carl Lindhagen

Carl Albert Lindhagen (17 December 1860 – 11 March 1946) was a Swedish lawyer, politician, and pacifist.

Carl Lindhagen was the chief magistrate (borgmästare) of Stockholm 1903–1930 (i.e. a legal position, not mayor).

== Life ==
Lindhagen was born in Stockholm. He was the son of Albert Lindhagen and the brother of Anna Lindhagen and Arthur Lindhagen. He studied law in Uppsala.

As a lawyer, Lindhagen participated as adviser for the executives of the testament of Alfred Nobel. He was the secretary of the Nobel Committee in 1899, and at times he was suggested as a nominee to receive the Nobel Peace Prize, for his anti-militarism commitments.

He started his political career in the Liberal party, which in the time before democracy was considered a radical movement. He joined the Swedish Social Democratic Party in 1909, when he was already almost 50 years old. He soon joined the leftist opposition against the party leader Hjalmar Branting. The left-wing was headed by the young Communist Zeth Höglund, and in 1917 the group broke away from the mother party and formed the Social Democratic Left Party of Sweden (SSV).

Lindhagen fought for democracy, women's rights and better conditions for the working class and working farmers. He was also an advocate for better conditions for the indigenous Sami people in mid- and northern Scandinavia.

Carl Lindhagen is known for his work for women's rights, and put forward a number of suggestions for the improvement of women's rights in the Swedish parliament, the most noted being that of women suffrage. In 1902, two motions regarding women suffrage reform were presented to the Swedish Parliament. One was from the Minister of Justice Hjalmar Hammarskjöld, who suggested that married men be given two votes, as they could be regarded to vote in place of their wives as well. The other motion was presented by Carl Lindhagen, who suggested women suffrage. The Hammarskjöld suggestion aroused anger among women's rights activists, who formed a support group for the Lindhagen motion. On 4 June 1902, National Association for Women's Suffrage (FKPR) was founded, which became the start point of the organized women suffrage movement in Sweden.

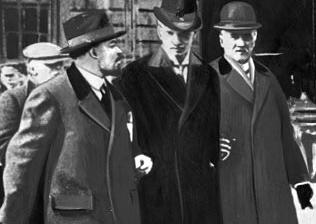
Lenin, Ture Nerman and Carl Lindhagen in Stockholm April 1917.

As the chief magistrate of Stockholm, Carl Lindhagen, together with Ture Nerman and Fredrik Ström, was part of a small delegation that greeted Lenin during his short visit in Stockholm in April 1917. The Swedish Socialists took Lenin to the PUB department store where they bought him a brand new suit so he would look good and clean coming back home to revolutionary Petrograd. Carl Lindhagen originally supported Lenin and the Bolshevik revolution in Russia, but he was also a pacifist and disagreed with some aspects of Communism. In 1921, he opposed the adoption of the Twenty-one Conditions of the ComIntern, and was thus expelled from SSV. He and fellow expellees formed a rump SSV.

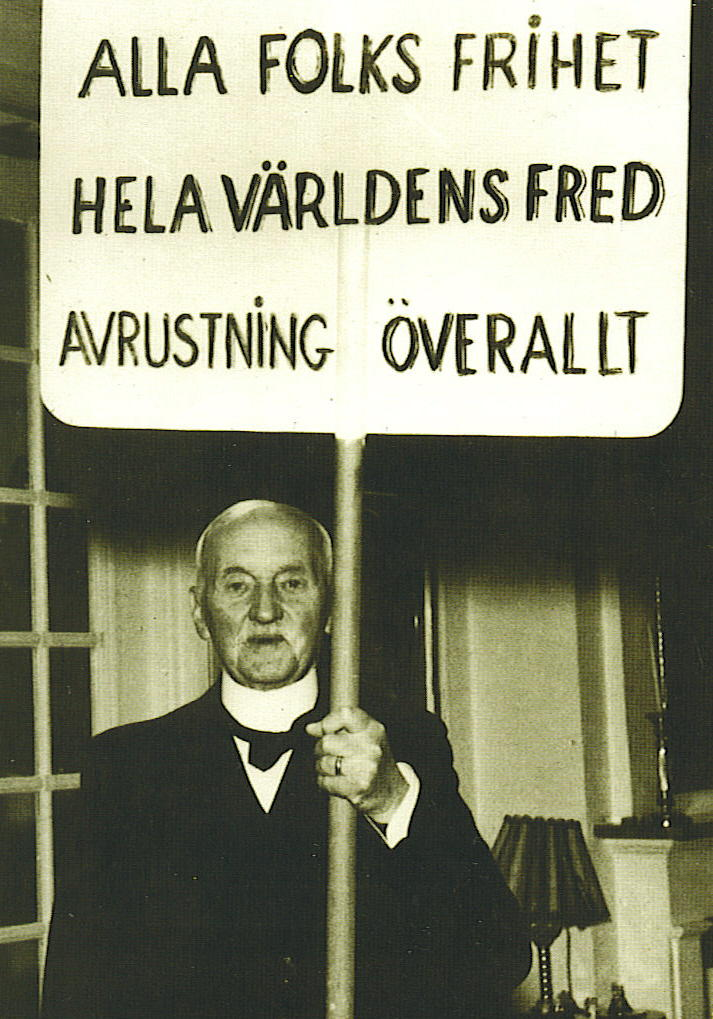
Carl Lindhagen holding his May Day sign saying: Alla folks frihet – Hela världens fred – avrustning överallt. (All people's freedom – World peace – Disarmament everywhere.)

In 1923 he, along with the rest of his party, rejoined the Social Democratic Party.

== Lindhagen and Esperanto ==
Lindhagen was a longtime supporter of the international language Esperanto. From 1911, he addressed the Swedish parliament almost every year about the idea of an international language. In 1928 he clearly proposed Esperanto. As a result, in 1929, 1930 and 1931 the Swedish parliament voted a sum of 2900 kronas for instructional Esperanto courses. He also participated in presenting the Esperanto course of Andreo Cseh for Swedish parliamentarians.

He gave the opening speech during the 1927 World Congress of Esperanto in Danzig, and also spoke during an instructional session during the 1934 Congress.

== Personal life ==
He married the first time in 1883 and his wife died after long sickness in 1902. He remarried in 1904 and had two children with his new wife, Jenny Lindhagen.
