= List of people from Stockholm =

This is a list of people connected to Stockholm, Sweden.

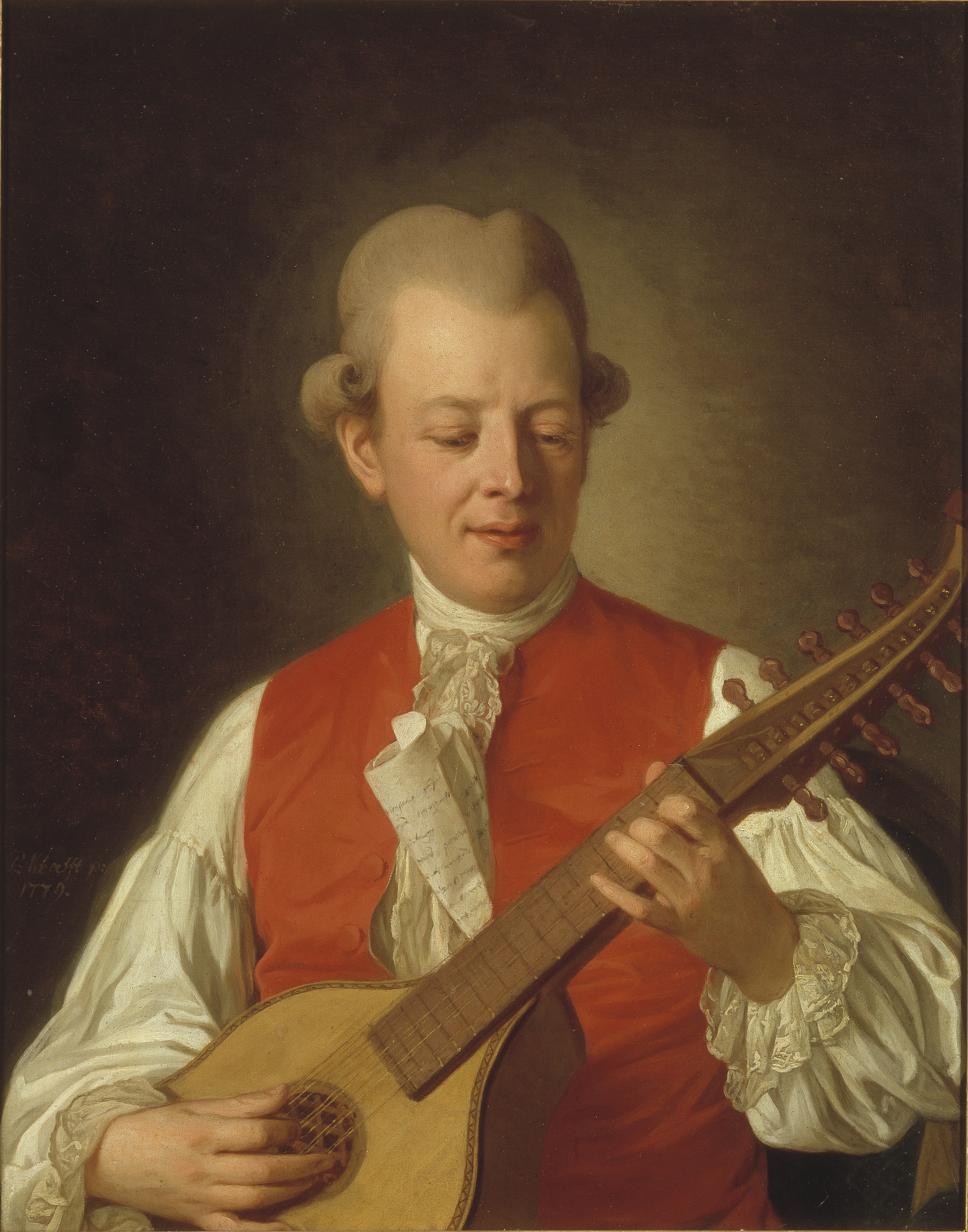
Carl Michael Bellman, 1779

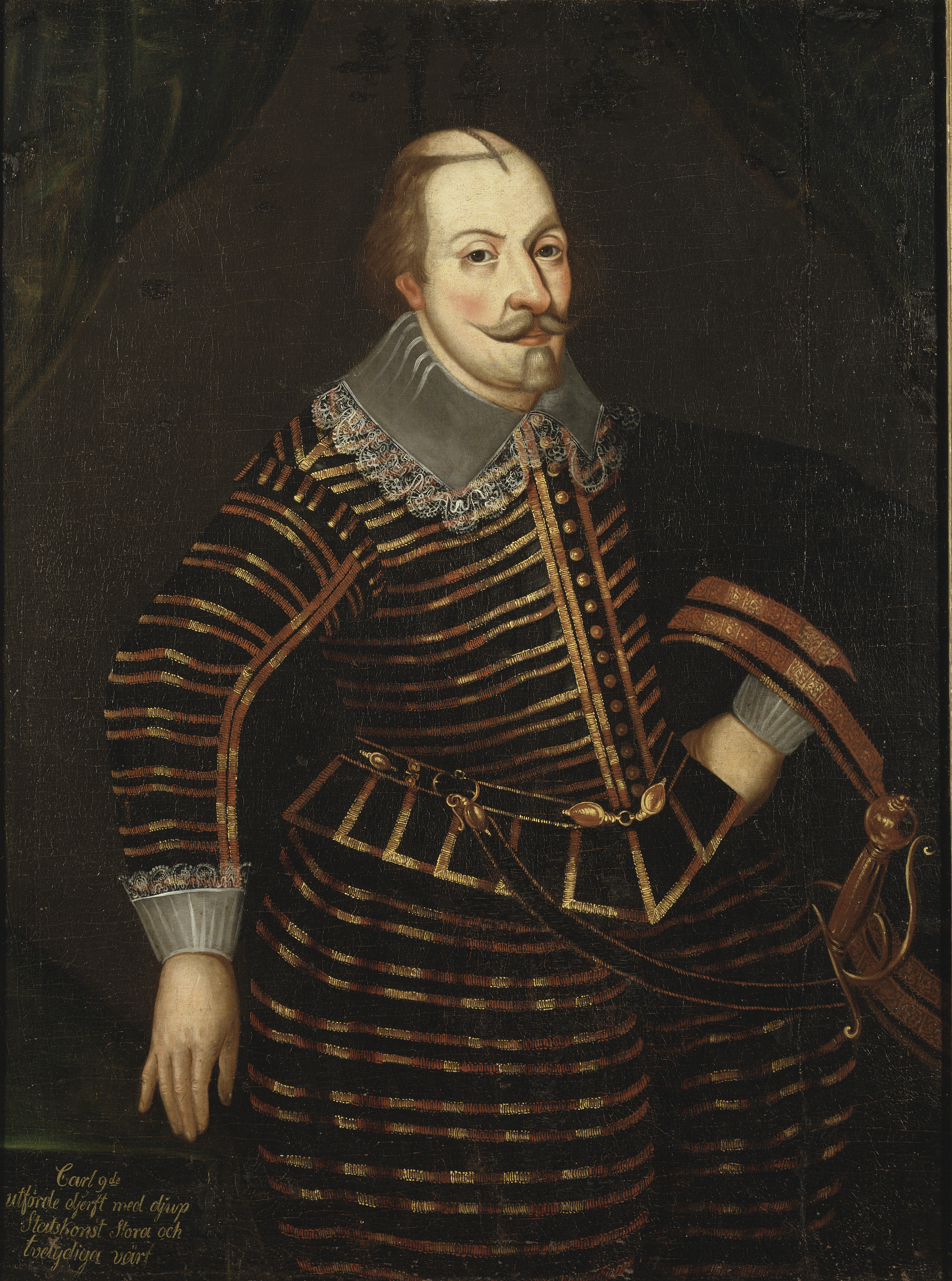
Charles IX of Sweden

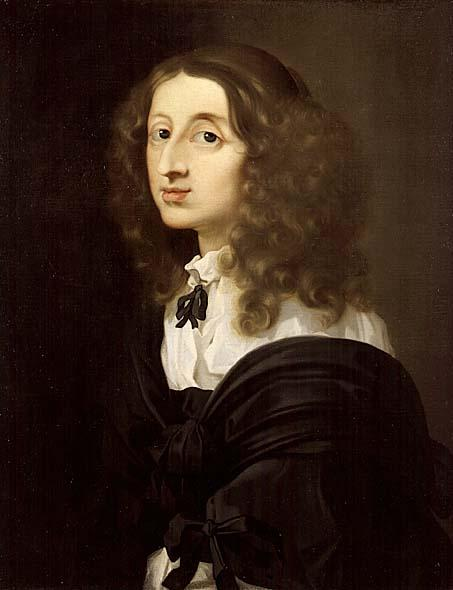
Queen Christina, 17th C.

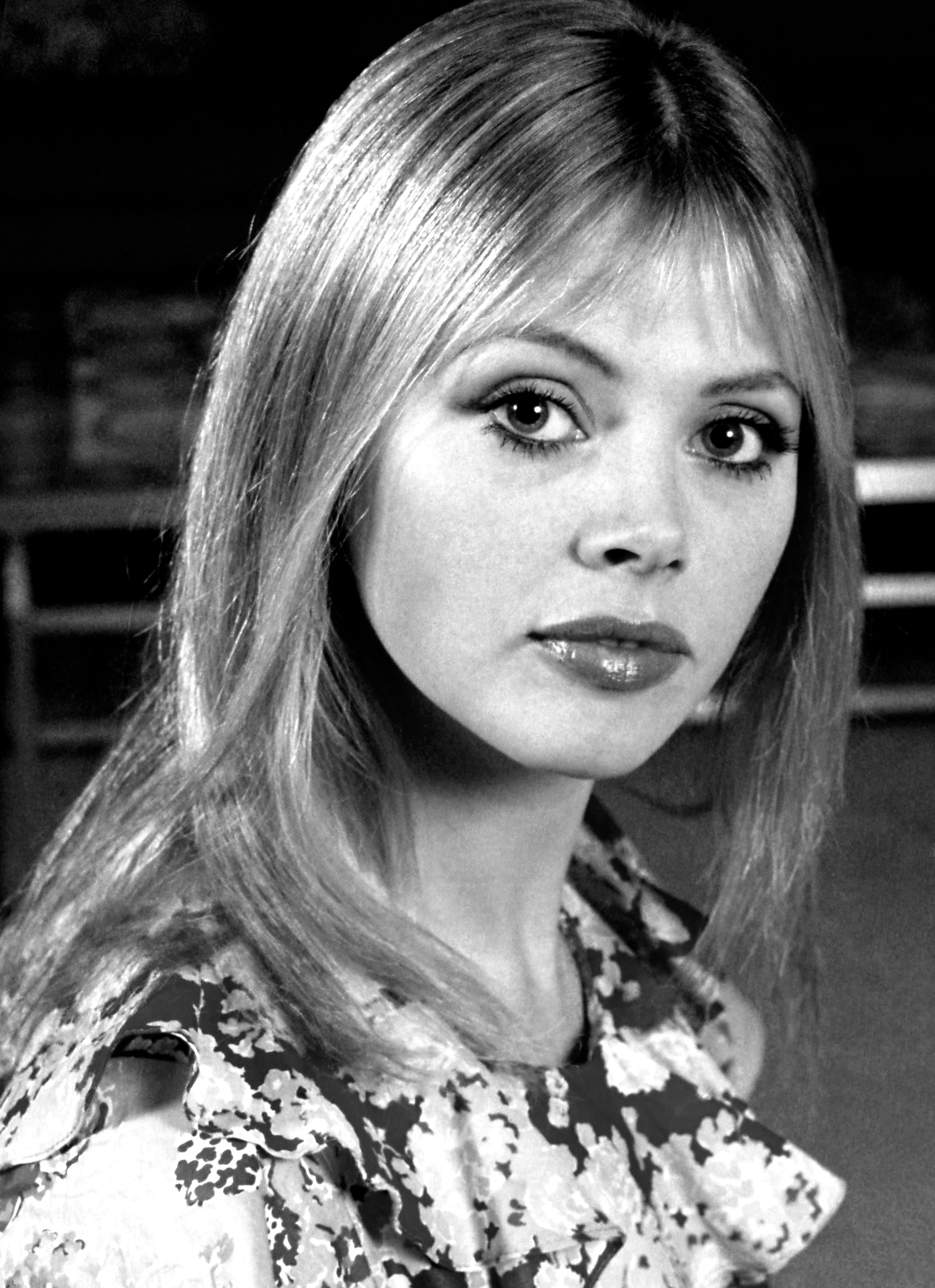
Britt Ekland, 1972

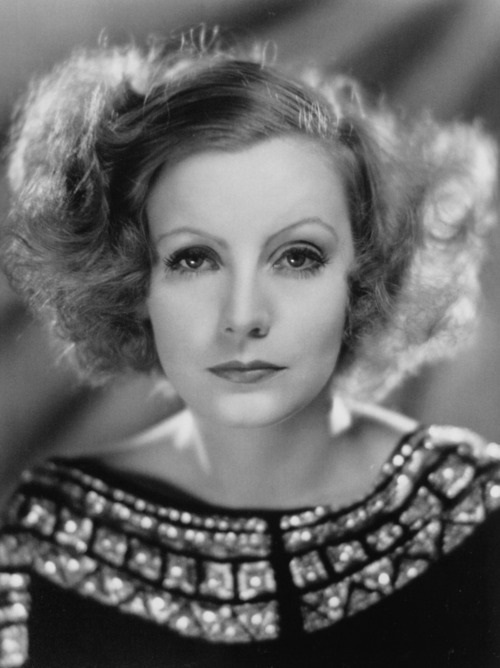
Greta Garbo, 1931

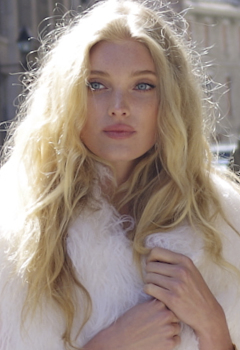
Elsa Hosk, 1987 in Stockholm

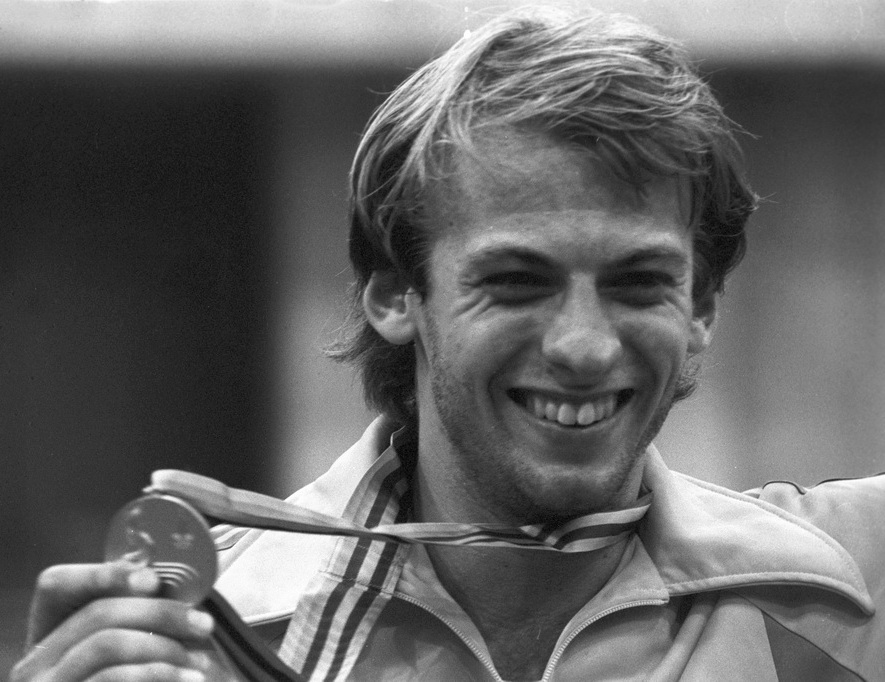
Johan Harmenberg, 1980

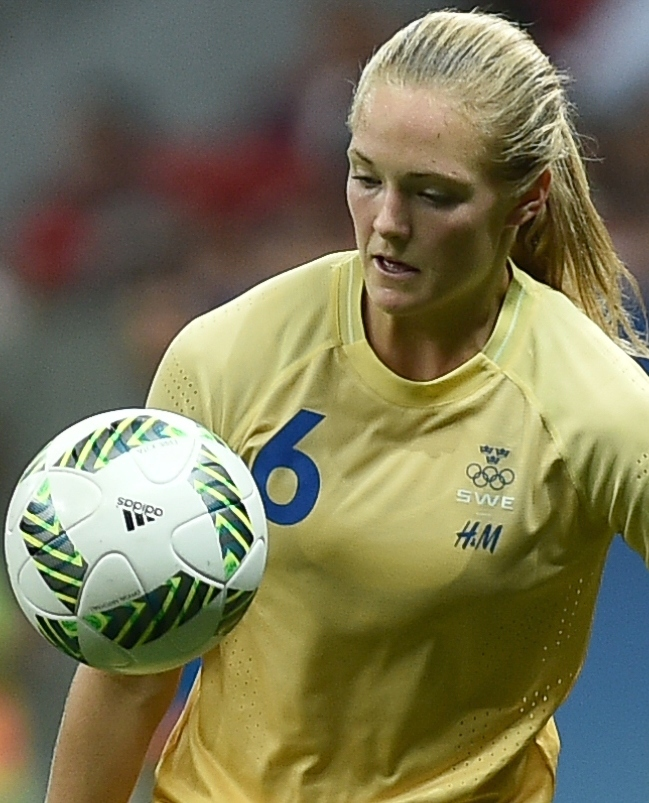
Magdalena Eriksson, 2016

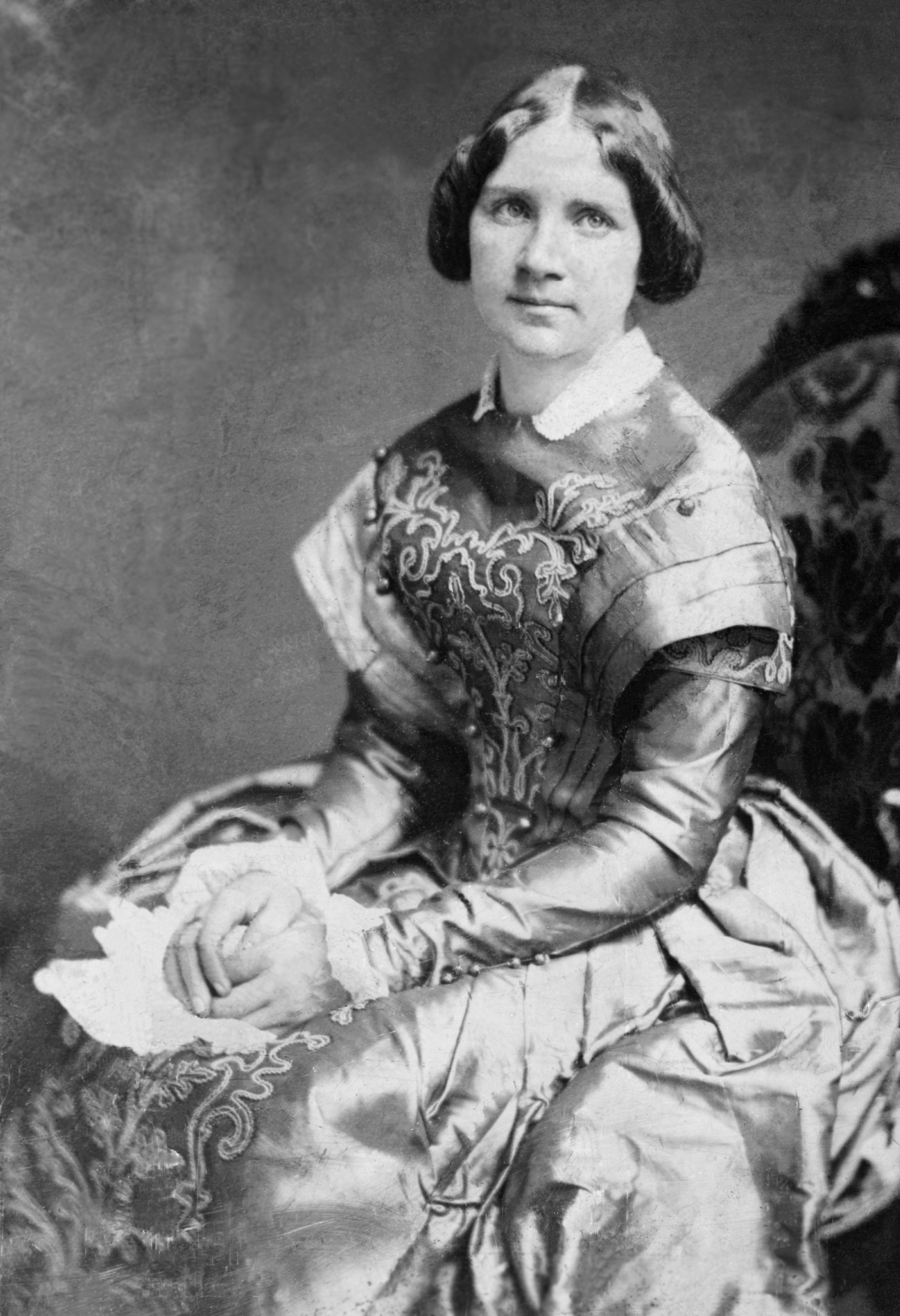
Jenny Lind, 1850

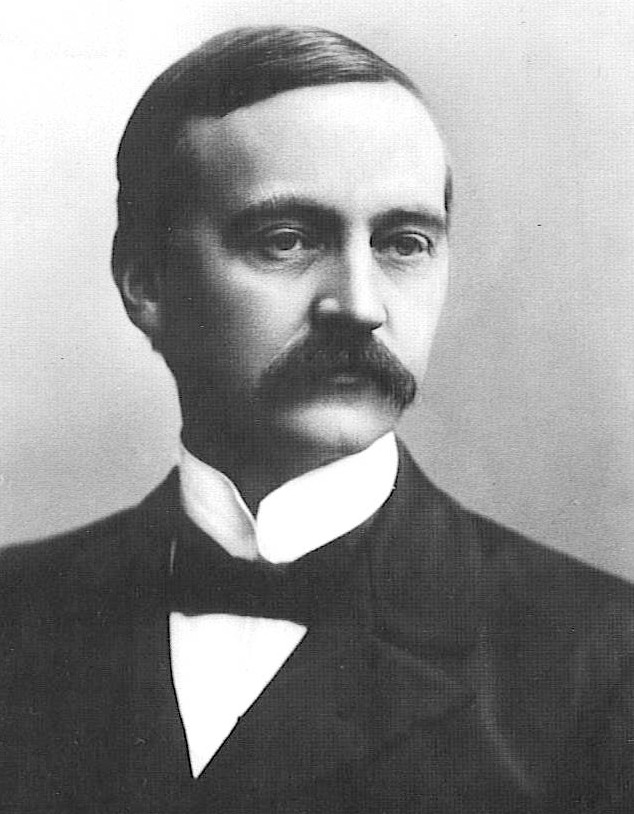
Carl Lindhagen, ca.1900

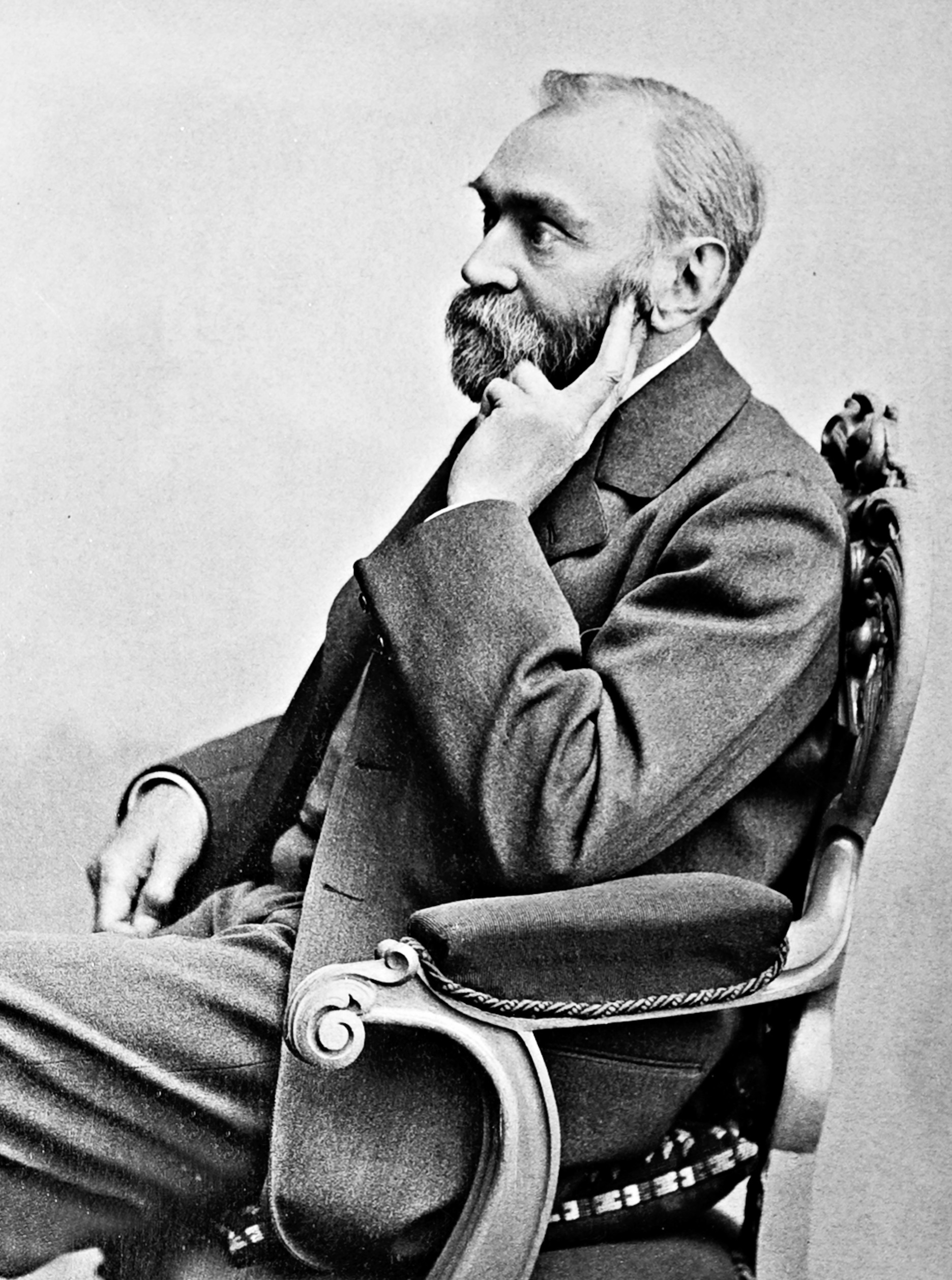
Alfred Nobel, pre 1896

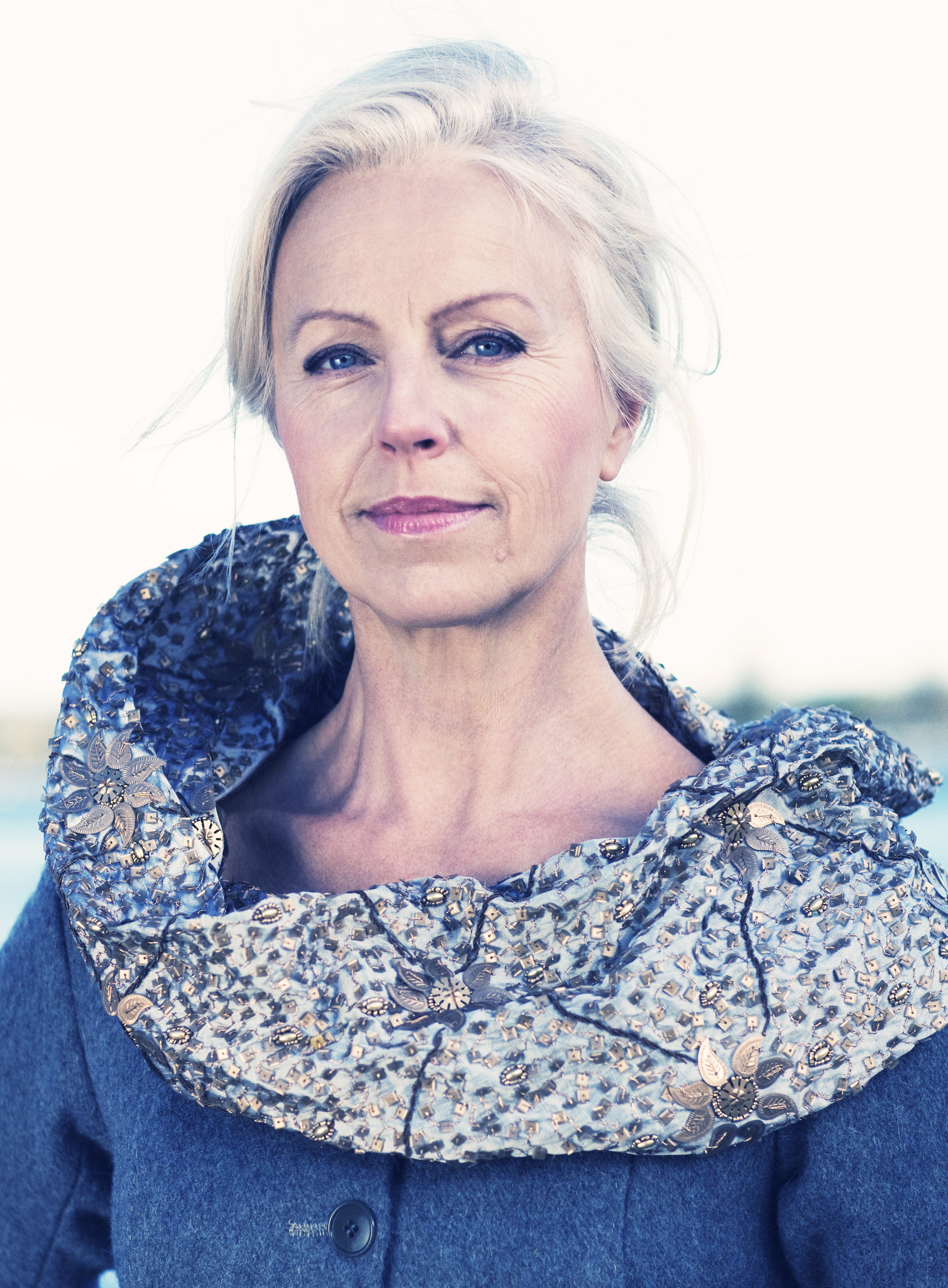
Anne Sofie von Otter, 2011

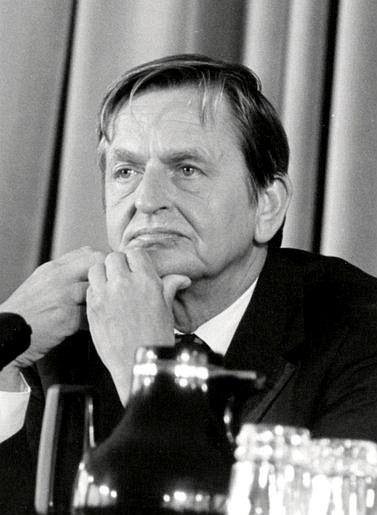
Olof Palme, 1984

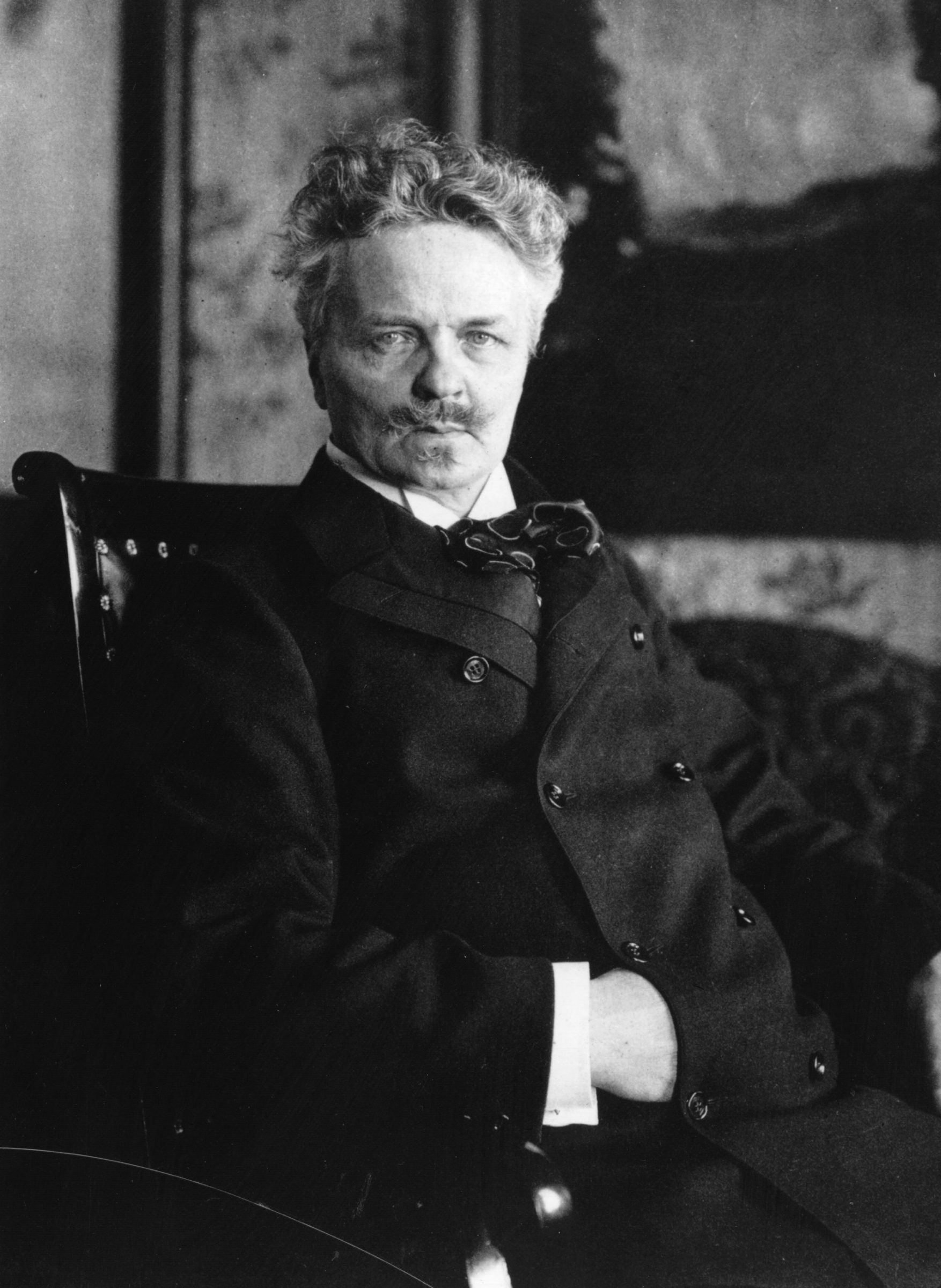
August Strindberg, ca.1900

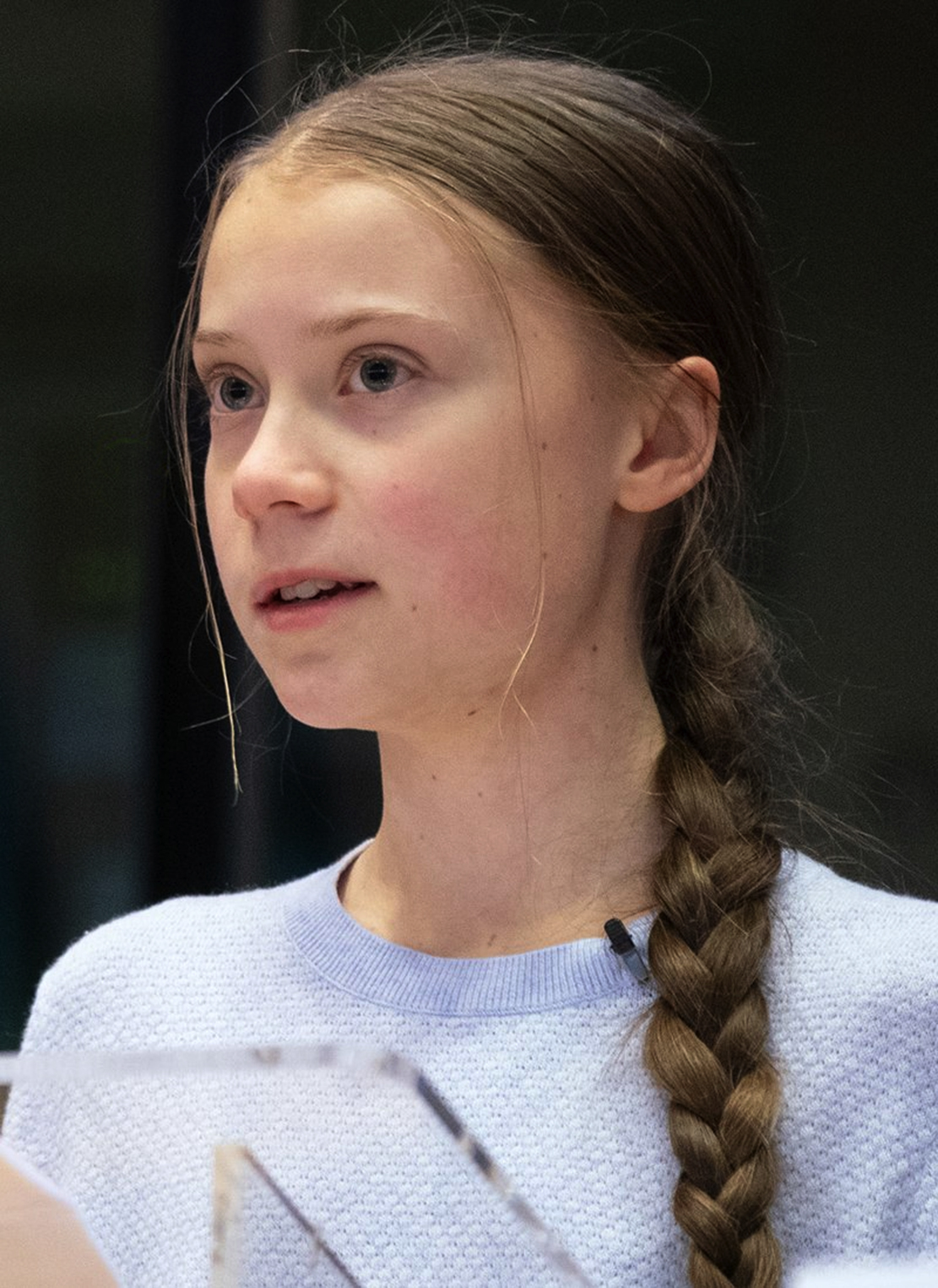
Greta Thunberg, 2020

== A ==
- Pontus Åberg (born 1993) ice hockey
- Vilma Abrahamsson (born 1999) football
- Per Ahlmark (1939–2018) politician
- Anna Ahlström (1863–1943) teacher
- Knut Ahnlund (1923–2012) historian
- Mikael Åkerfeldt (born 1974) musician
- Jonas Åkerlund (born 1965) films
- Hugo Alfvén (1872–1960) musician
- Carl Jonas Love Almqvist (1793–1866) author, poet and composer
- Lars Amble (1939–2015) actor
- Ellen Ammann (1870–1932) politician
- Bo Ancker (1926–1997) writer, journalist, radio personality
- Bella Andersson (born 2006) footballer for the Sweden national team
- Benny Andersson (born 1946) ABBA
- Bibi Andersson (1935–2019) actress
- Harriet Andersson (born 1932) actress
- Leif Erland Andersson (1943–1979) astronomer
- Max Andersson (born 1962) comics
- Björn Andrésen (1955–2025) actor and musician
- Johan Jacob Anckarström (1762–1792) military officer and royal assassin
- Mikael Appelgren (born 1961) table tennis
- Ellen Arkbro (born 1990) composer
- Maria Aspman (1865–1944) educator
- Rozita Auer (born 1952) belly dancer
- Tor Aulin (1866–1914) violinist

== B ==
- Amanda Zahui B. (born 1993) professional basketball player
- Sven-Erik Bäck (1919–1994) composer
- Carl Michael Bellman (1740–1795) songwriter, composer, musician and poet
- Natanael Berg (1879–1957) composer
- Tim Bergling (1989–2018), known professionally as Avicii, DJ, remixer, and music producer
- Bo Bergman (1869–1967) writer
- Ingrid Bergman (1915–1982) actress
- Hanna Bergstrøm (1885–1948) politician
- Sune Bergström (1916–2004) biochemist
- Folke Bernadotte (1895–1948) diplomacy
- Lennart Bernadotte (1909–2004) landscaper, filmmaker and photographer
- Jenny Berthelius (1923–2019) writer
- Astrid Berwald (1886–1982) pianist
- Franz Berwald (1796–1868) composer
- Johan Fredrik Berwald (1787–1861) violinist, conductor and composer
- Elsa Beskow (1874–1953) author
- Ivan Betskoy (1704–1795) education
- Carl Bildt (born 1949) diplomacy
- Hugo Birger) (1854–1887) painter
- Bladee (born 1994) rapper
- August Blanche (1811–1868) novelist
- Joakim Bonnier (1930–1972) Formula One driver
- Björn Borg (born 1956) tennis player
- Ali Boulala (born 1979) skateboarder
- Jesper Bratt (born 1998) ice hockey player
- Sophia Elisabet Brenner (1659–1730) poet
- Oscar Byström (1821–1909) composer

== C ==
- Bernt Carlsson (1938–1988) diplomat
- Sir William Chambers (1726–1796)
- Charles IX of Sweden (1550–1611)
- Charles XI of Sweden (1655–1697)
- Charles XII of Sweden (1682–1718)
- Charles XIII of Sweden (1748–1818)
- Charles XV of Sweden (1826–1872)
- Charles XVI of Sweden (born 1946)
- Eagle-Eye Cherry (born 1968) singer
- Neneh Cherry (born 1964) singer
- Queen Christina (1626–1689)

== D ==
- Michael Dahl (1659–1743) painter
- Count Erik Dahlbergh (1625–1703) military engineer and field marshal
- Birger Dahlerus (1891–1957) diplomacy
- Carl Dahlström (born 1995) ice hockey
- Tommy Denander (born 1968) guitarist
- Ernst Didring (1868–1931) author

== E ==
- Britt Ekland (born 1942) actress
- Pelle Eklund (born 1963) ice hockey
- Tzahi Elihen (born 1991) Israeli footballer
- Norman Ellis (born 1943) British trade union leader
- Tove Enblom (born 1994) footballer
- Erik XIV of Sweden (1533–1577)
- Magdalena Eriksson (born 1993) footballer
- Ulf von Euler (1905–1983) physiologist and pharmacologist

== F ==
- Rebecca Ferguson (born 1983) actress
- Axel von Fersen the Elder (1719–1794) statesman and soldier
- Axel von Fersen the Younger (1755–1810) diplomat and statesman
- Aron Flam (born 1978), comedian, podcaster, and writer, and actor
- Forsen (born 1990) video streamer
- Ruth Forsling (1923–1985) teacher and politician
- Erik Ivar Fredholm (1866–1927) maths

== G ==
- Greta Garbo (1905–1990) actress
- Anders Gärderud (born 1946) athlete
- Magnus Hedman (born 1973) footballer
- Nicolai Gedda (1925–2017) tenor
- Mikael Gerdén (born 1973) retired professional ice hockey player
- Elina Gravin (born 2007), Swedish gymnast
- Gustav II Adolf (1594–1632)
- Gustav III of Sweden (1746–1792)
- Gustav IV Adolf (1778–1837)
- Gustaf VI Adolf of Sweden (1882–1973)
- Allan Gutheim (born 1962) composer

== H ==
- Ivar Hallström (1826–1901) composer
- Lasse Hallström (born 1946) film director
- Kurt Hamrin (1934–2024) footballer
- Johan Harmenberg (born 1954) Olympic champion fencer
- Lee Hazlewood (1929–2007) singer
- Eli Heckscher (1879–1952) economist
- Sven Hedin (1865–1952) explorer
- Anders Hillborg (born 1954) composer
- Smilla Holmberg (born 1958) footballer for the Sweden national team
- Anna Höglund (born 1958) illustrator
- Hans Holmér (1930–2002) civil servant
- Count Anders Johan von Höpken (1712–1789) statesman
- Carola Häggkvist (born 1966) singer
- Elsa Hosk (born 1987) model and former Victoria's Secret Angel

== I ==
- Sebastian Ingrosso (born 1983) DJ

== J ==
- Mattias Janmark (born 1992) ice hockey player
- Agnes Janson (1861–1947) opera singer
- Lennart Johansson (1929–2019) UEFA
- Erland Josephson (1923–2012) actor

== K ==
- Mary Karadja (1868–1943) writer and spiritualist
- J F Karlsson (born 1996) ice hockey
- Oskar Klein (1894–1977) physicist
- Erland von Koch (1910–2009) composer
- Helge von Koch (1870–1924) mathematician
- Christian von Koenigsegg (born 1972) automotive mogul
- Vendela Kirsebom (born 1967) model
- Marcus Kruger (born 1970) ice hockey player
- Oliver Kylington (born 1997) ice hockey player

== L ==
- La Godiva (born 1992) DJ, producer, singer and songwriter (Teresa Nova)
- Lucie Lagerbielke (1865–1931), writer and painter
- Gabriel Landeskog (born 1992) ice hockey
- Carl Larsson (1853–1919) painter
- Zara Larsson (born 1997) singer
- Yung Lean (born 1996) rapper
- Jonna Lee (born 1981) singer
- Jenny Lind (1820–1887) singer
- Erik Lindahl (1891–1960) economist
- Christian Lindberg (born 1958) trombone player
- Alessandro Lindblad (born 1991) DJ
- Barbro Lindgren (born 1937) writer
- Carl Lindhagen (1860–1946) politician
- Paula Lizell (1873–1962) soprano
- Tove Lo (born 1987) singer and actress
- Anna-Lena Löfgren (1944–2010) singer
- Giovanni di Lorenzo (born 1959) editor
- Dolph Lundgren (born 1957) actor
- Fredrica Löf (1760–1813) actress
- Hedvig Lovén (1867–1943) botanist
- Ulf Lundell (born 1949) musician

== M ==
- Yngwie Malmsteen (born 1963) guitar
- Jenny Mannerheim (born 1977) arts
- Max Martin (born 1971) singer
- Mijailo Mijailović (born 1978) murderer
- Gösta Mittag-Leffler (1846–1927) maths

== N ==
- Alfred Nobel (1833–1896) chemist, engineer and inventor
- Michael Nobel (born 1940) entrepreneur
- H. C. Nordenflycht (1718–1763) poet
- Elsa-Brita Nordlund (1903–1987) child psychiatrist
- Lars Norén (1944–2021) playwright
- Ludvig Norman (1831–1885) composer
- Mattias Norström (born 1972) ice hockey
- Michael Nylander (born 1972) ice hockey
- Bobby Nystrom (born 1952) ice hockey

== O ==
- Claes Oldenburg (1929–2022) sculptor
- Lena Olin (born 1955) actress
- Sigrid Onegin (1889–1943) opera singer
- Oscar II (1829–1907) king
- Anne Sofie von Otter (born 1955) singer
- Bengt Gabrielsson Oxenstierna (1623–1702) statesman
- Johan Oxenstierna (1611–1657) count

== P ==
- Anna Palm de Rosa (1859–1924) artist
- Olof Palme (1927–1986) politician
- Jesper Parnevik (born 1965) golfer
- Ulrika Pasch (1735–1796) painter
- Johann Patkul (1660–1707) Livonian nobleman and politician
- Carl Fredrik Pechlin (1720–1796) politician and demagogue
- Markus Persson (born 1979) programmer
- Torsten Persson (born 1954) economist
- Count Carl Piper (1647–1716) diplomat and statesman
- Hedvig Posse (1861–1927) missionary in South Africa, linguist and hymn writer

== R ==
- Nino Ramsby (born 1972) musician
- Eddie Razaz (born 1988) singer
- Jonas Renkse (born 1975) musician
- Johan Helmich Roman (1694–1758) Baroque composer
- Robyn (born 1979) singer
- Keke Rosberg (born 1948) racing driver
- Karl Asmund Rudolphi (1771–1832) German naturalist
- Nina Rung (born 1981), feminist and criminologist
- Emilia Rydberg (born 1978) singer
- Edvin Ryding (born 2003) actor

== S ==
- Signe Salén (1871–1963) doctor
- Ilya Salmanzadeh (born 1986) singer
- Signe Schmidt-Nielsen (1878–1959) scientist
- Johan Tobias Sergel (1740–1814) sculptor
- Emma Sjöberg (born 1968) fashion model
- Maj Sjöwall (1935–2020) crime novelist
- Alexander Skarsgård (born 1976) actor
- Bill Skarsgård (born 1990) actor
- Gustaf Skarsgård (born 1980) actor
- Valter Skarsgård (born 1995) actor
- Lennart Skoglund (1929–1975) footballer
- Count Carl Snoilsky (1841–1903) poet
- Kristina Söderbaum (1912–2001) actress
- Hjalmar Söderberg (1869–1941) novelist
- Annika Sörenstam (born 1970) golfer
- Art Spiegelman (born 1948) cartoonist
- Wilhelm Stenhammar (1871–1927) composer, conductor and pianist
- Elisabet Strid (born 1976), opera singer
- August Strindberg (1849–1912) playwright, poet and painter
- Ulla Strömstedt (1939–1986) actress
- Mats Sundin (born 1971) ice hockey
- Anna Sundstrand (born 1989) singer
- Magna Sunnerdahl (1863–1935) philanthropist
- Emanuel Swedenborg (1688–1772) theologian, scientist and philosopher
- Annika Sörenstam (born 1970) golfer

== T ==
- Marie Taglioni (1804–1884) ballet dancer
- Carl Gustaf Tessin (1695–1770) count and politician
- Joakim Thåström (born 1957) singer
- Thora Thersner (1818–1867) artist
- Greta Thunberg (born 2003) activist
- Arne Tiselius (1902–1971) biochemist
- Sara Torsslow (1795–1859) actress

== V ==
- Astrid Varnay (1918–2006) soprano

== W ==
- Jan-Ove Waldner (born 1965) table tennis
- Gerda Wallander (1860–1926) painter
- Anna Warburg (1881–1967) educator
- Per Wästberg (born 1933) writer
- Alexander Wennberg (born 1994) hockey
- Knut Wicksell (1851–1926) economist
- Beppe Wolgers (1928–1986) poet and actor

== Z ==
- Sophie Zelmani (born 1972) singer
