= Karolina Widerström =

Swedish gynecologist

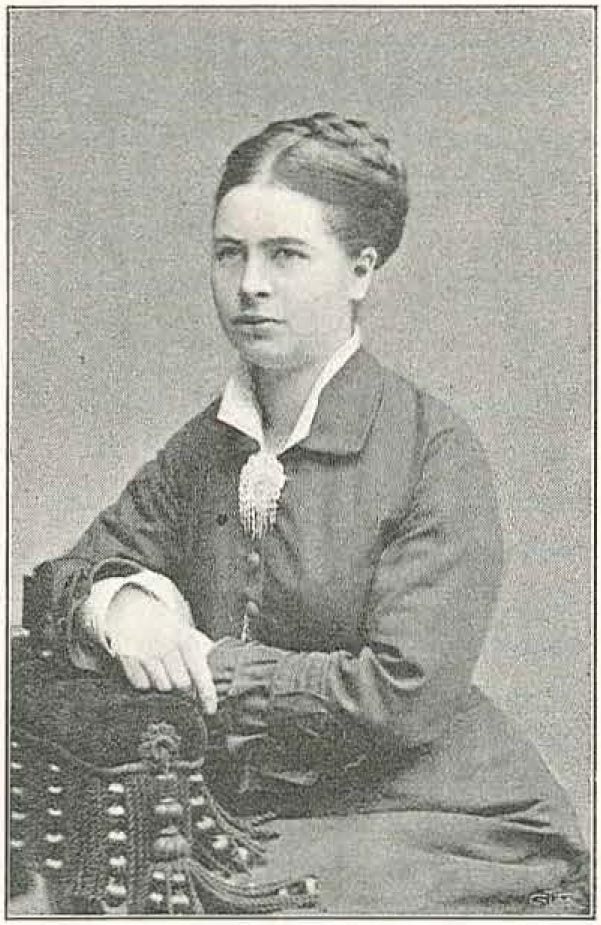
- Karolina Widerström
- Born: 10 December 1856; Helsingborg, Sweden-Norway
- Died: 4 March 1949 (aged 92)
- Education: Karolinska Institutet
- Occupations: doctor and gynecologist
- Known for: the first female physician with a university education

Karolina Olivia Widerström (10 December 1856 – 4 March 1949) was a Swedish medical doctor and gynecologist. She was the first female physician with a university education in her country. She was also a feminist and a politician, and engaged in the questions of sexual education and female suffrage. She was chairwoman of the National Association for Women's Suffrage and a member of the Stockholm city council.

== Early life and education ==
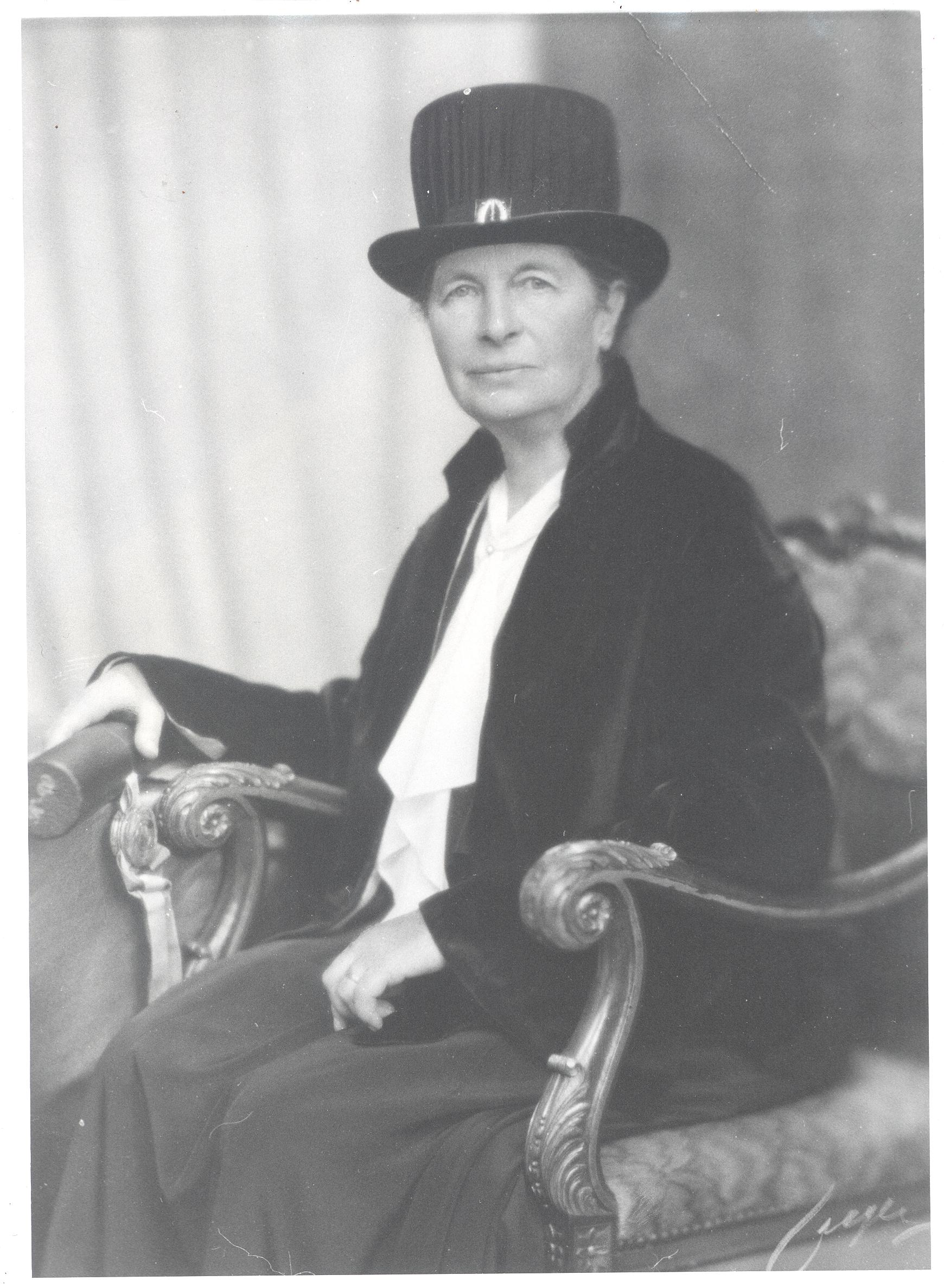
Karolina Widerström

Karolina Widerström was born in Helsingborg on 10 December 1856, was the only child of Olivia Erika Dillén and gymnastics teacher and veterinarian Otto Fredrik Widerström. The family moved to Stockholm in 1873. After her mother's death in 1909, she lived together with educator and headmistress Maria Aspman (1865–1944).

Women were officially admitted to the universities in Sweden in 1870. Widerström's father wished for her to be a gymnastics teacher like himself. In 1873–1875, Karolina Widerström was a student at the Royal Central Gymnastics Institute, and in 1875–1877, she was the assistant to Professor Branting. She was also active as a physiotherapist.

In 1879, she received a degree at Wallinska skolan and in 1880 a degree in medical philosophy at the university at Uppsala. In May 1884, she received a medical degree at the Karolinska Institutet in Stockholm.

== Medical career ==
Widerström wanted women and girls to know more about their own bodies, to dress more healthily, and to receive the same rights and possibilities as men. She was especially active within gynecology and women's health. Her best-known work within her field was Kvinnohygien ('Women's hygiene'), which was first published in 1899. It was reprinted in seven editions until 1932.

== Activism ==
She worked with the Kvinnliga Läkares Förening (Association for Female Doctors).

Concerned for women's health issues, she was a strong supporter of the Swedish Dress Reform Association and a vocal force in writing medical articles advocating against tight laced corsets, which at this point in time was a serious health issue.

From about 1900, Widerström was active in the struggle to abolish the so-called reglementation of prostitutes, that is to say the forced registration and regular examination for venereal diseases of prostitutes, a system highly debated among women's rights activists at the time, which organized in the Svenska Federationen to oppose it.

== Political engagement ==
Karolina Widström was elected to the Stockholm city council in 1912 for the Liberals, and served until 1915. She was elected chairwoman of the Swedish Society for Woman Suffrage in 1918, one year before the women suffrage was granted in Sweden in 1919, and became its last chairwoman when she stepped down after the organisation was dissolved in 1921, when the purpose of the organisation was fulfilled and both genders exercised the right to vote in the 1921 election.

== See also ==
- Charlotte Yhlen, first female Swedish physician who graduated from a university (though in this case, abroad)
- Hedda Andersson, second female physician in Sweden
- Emmy Rappe, first trained professional Swedish nurse
- Astrid Björkman, Sweden's first female chief physician and hospital manager
- Anna Stecksén, first Swedish woman to defend a doctoral thesis in medicine

== Sources ==
- Lena Hammarberg, Karolina Widerström - sexualreformator och föreningskvinna
- Ny svensk historia: Oscar II och hans tid, 1872–1907, Erik Lindorm 1936 s.231
- Sveriges befolkning 1890, (CD-ROM) Riksarkivet 2003
- University of Gothenburg website, Rösträtt, biografier
- Lundberg, Anna (2008). Läkarnas blanka vapen: svensk smittskyddslagstiftning i historiskt perspektiv. Läkarnas blanka vapen: svensk smittskyddslagstiftning i historiskt perspektiv. Sid. 85. ISBN 978-91-85509-08-9
