= La Godiva =

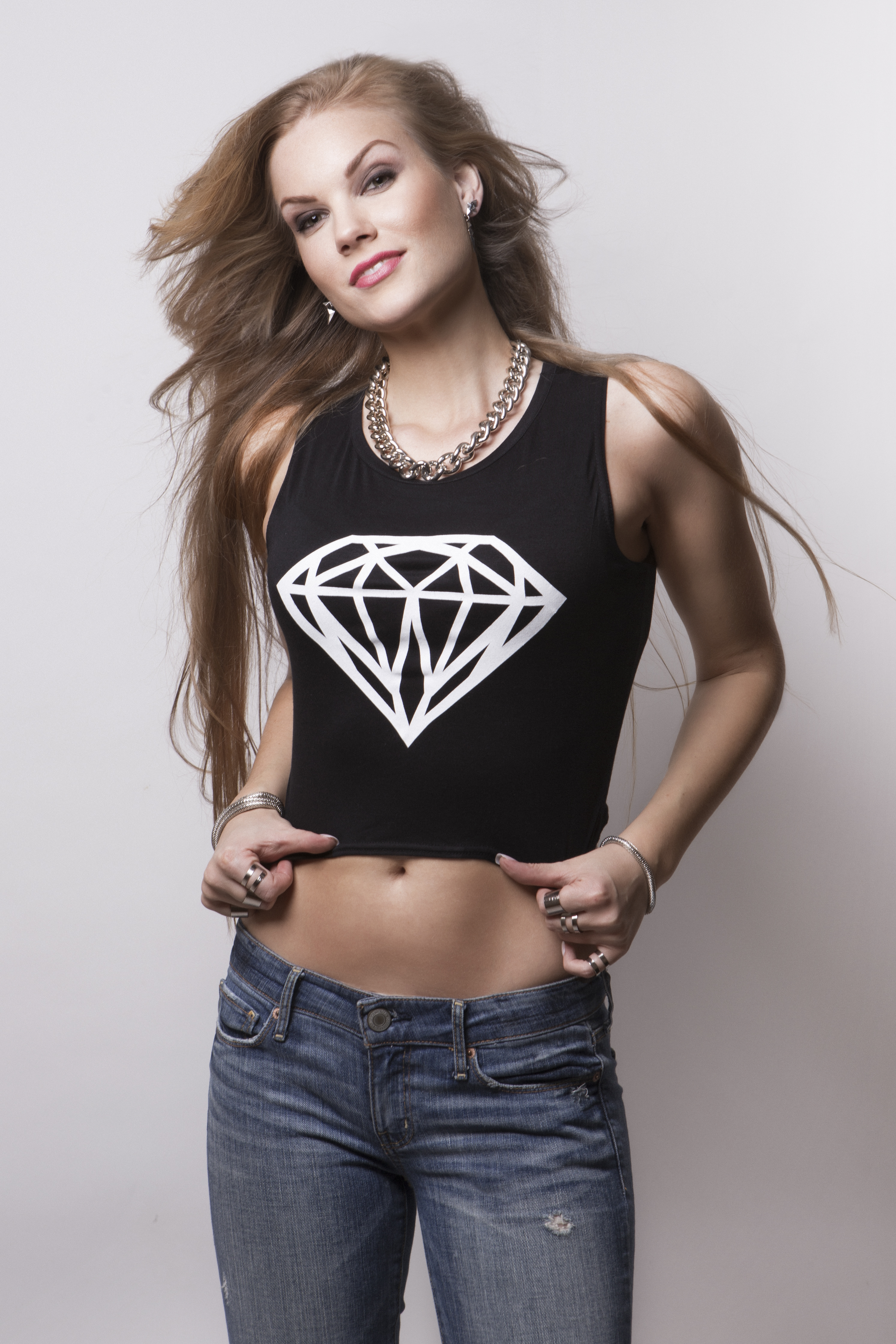

Background information
- Born: Teresa Nova; 8 May 1992 (age 34)
- Genres: R&B; Soul; Pop; EDM; House
- Occupations: Artist; DJ; Singer; Songwriter; Record producer
- Instruments: Vocals; Piano
- Years active: 2012–present
- Website: www.lagodiva.net

La Godiva is the stage name of the Swedish DJ, producer, singer and songwriter Teresa Nova (born 8 May 1992). As revealed in an interview in the Czech Good Morning TV Show, the stage name comes from the legend of Lady Godiva, as they both share the same trait: long strawberry blonde hair. She won the 2014 Indie Music Channel Songwriter Award for Best Dance Songwriter with the song Break. She also performed at the Baltic Song Contest in 2014, representing the Czech Republic. She has also been going on international tours, performing live on festivals and concerts, mainly in Sweden, the United Kingdom and the Czech Republic.

== Early life and education ==
Teresa Nova was born and raised in Stockholm, Sweden, with a Czech mother and a Polish father. She attended the local music school taking piano and violin lessons when growing up. She soon started to write and compose her own songs, and started singing a lot of Soul and R&B. She moved to Weston Super Mare when she was nine years old and attended a primary school. She and her family later moved back to Sweden, where she enrolled in an English primary and secondary school called Internationella Engelska Skolan, at the same time when the singers from First Aid Kit was attending the same school. The artist is fluent in four languages: Swedish, English, Czech and Polish.

== Music career ==
La Godiva has been recognized for her music to be a mix between R&B and House or Electronic dance music (EDM), especially her latest singles Break and You Never Call Me Back in 2014. She has appeared live on various shows, e.g. the Czech TV show Home Alone (Sama doma) and Na Forbine. Soon thereafter she appeared on the news at another Czech TV channel called ZAK.

In March 2014 she was an honored guest at the TV show Good Morning (Dobré ráno) in the Czech Republic. After the interview she performed an acoustic version of her new single You Never Call Me Back. In the interview she mentioned that she is going to be DJing at the DJ festival Wonderland in Prague, along with other DJs such as Danny Ávila and Twoloud. Other famous DJs that have previously performed at Wonderland are Hardwell, Alesso, Michael Woods, Sander van Doorn, Deniz Koyu, Marco V, Swanky Tunes, and more.

The artist has also performed at various festivals, such as Decibely Pomoci for charity sponsored by SOS Children's Villages in Jihlava (Czech Republic), and the Salford Music Festival, close to Manchester (UK). Her music has been picked up and aired at different radio channels (e.g. Paul FM Dance Music Radio ( www.paulfmradio.com ), Salford City Radio, EDM Radio Productions, Regina Radio, etc. ). She was also interviewed by the DJ legend and music journalist Miloš Skalka (a friend to the famous Czech singer Karel Gott) who also interviewed legendary artists like Paul McCartney.

== Discography ==
Music
Song	Genre	Release Type	Release name	Year
Farewell	Pop	EP	Farwell	2012
Superficial	EDM	EP	Farwell	2012
Liar	Pop/Rock	EP	Farwell	2012
Unfair	Pop	EP	Farwell	2012
Hell No	Blues	EP	Farwell	2012
Strong	EDM	EP	Strong	2013
Psycho	EDM	EP	Strong	2013
Busy World	EDM	EP	Strong	2013
When I've Got You	Pop	EP	Strong	2013
For So Long	Pop	EP	Strong	2013
You Never Call Me Back	EDM	Single	You Never Call Me Back	2014
Break	EDM	Single	Break	2014
