= Salford Music Festival =

- Genre: Indie, Rock, World, Electronic, Reggae, Folk, Hip-hop, Dance
- Dates: September
- Locations: Salford, England
- Years active: 2010-
- Website: Salford Music Festival

The Salford Music Festival is an annual festival held each September primarily to promote local artists although artists of all genres from other parts of Britain also perform. It is a not for profit group run by volunteers.

== History ==
The idea for the festival followed an exhibition organised by Salford Museum and Art Gallery celebrating the history of popular music in Salford entitled Quiffs Riffs and Tiffs which featured notable musicians from Salford: The Hollies to Joy Division to the Ting Tings, many of whom are credited as being from the neighbouring city of Manchester.

The first year was 2010 and about 60 artists and bands performed in 6 venues and was headlined by Salford's Mark E Smith and The Fall. In 2011, the festival grew to 120 bands and 15 DJ's and featured Molotov Jukebox fronted by Harry Potter star Natalia Tena. The main stage event had 4 rooms within the Willows, then home to Salford Rugby League Football Club. Three of the rooms were named after icons of music, two of whom came from Salford: Anthony H Wilson and Bryan Glancy while another paid tribute to John Peel. In 2012, has over 200 bands playing in 18 venues all within the City of Salford. The Fall performed 3 times. The main stage was The Lowry in Salford Quays adjacent to what is now called MediaCityUK to where the BBC recently located. An exhibition of photography of the 2012 Festival "Salford Music Yerrrr!" was held at the Salford Museum and Art Gallery in the Blue Stairs Gallery from August to October 2013. The exhibition was opened by the celebrated Salford artist Harold Riley

In 2013, the number of artists/bands increased to nearly 300 in 25 venues/27 stages. Opening headliner was Ren Harvieu

The 2014 festival ran from 25 to 28 September 2014

Most of the events are free and held in pubs and churches across the city conurbation.

In 2013 the festival organisers formed the Salford Music Foundation which is registered as a Nonprofit organization
