= Nina Rung =

Swedish criminologist and anti-domestic violence activist

Nina Rung (born 26 December 1981) is a Swedish debater and feminist who was awarded the 2020 Zaide Catalán prize for her efforts to combat sexual violence. A graduate in gender studies and political science from Stockholm University, Rung has worked with the Stockholm police to investigate sexual crimes against children. Together with her partner Peter Svensson, she has founded Huskuraged, a non-profit organization which provides guidelines for neighbours, encouraging them to act if they experiences signs of domestic violence. She now devotes much of her time to lecturing on violence prevention and supporting Huskurage.

== Biography ==
Born in Stockholm on 26 December 1981, Nina Rung attended Stockholm University, graduating in gender studies in 2004. She went on to earn a further bachelor's degree in criminology in 2007.

== Career ==
Rung is active as a criminologist with the Stockholm police where she has investigated serious acts of violence between partners as well as sexual violence against children. She devotes much of her time to lecturing on how people can help to diminish the problem. She has also been critical of the related shortcomings of the Swedish legal system. In 2014, together with her partner Peter Svensson, she created Huskurage which was designed to prevent domestic violence by encouraging neighbours to act if they become aware of indications that adults or children can be hurt. It provides simple guidelines on what to do if there are signs of violence in the neighbourhood.

== Awards ==
In 2020, Nina Rung was awarded the Zaida Catalán prize for disseminating knowledge about sexual violence and influencing public opinion through her Hushurage association. This was seen as a significant contribution to improved rights for children and women.
