= Maria Aspman =

Swedish educator specializing in women's vocational training

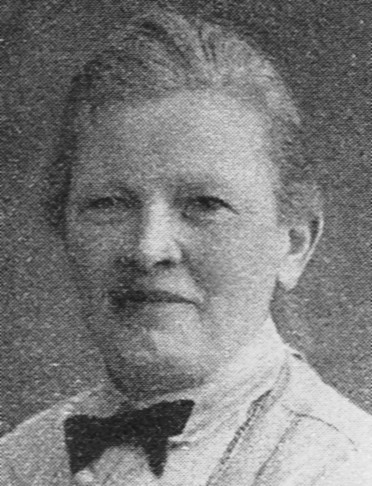
Maria Aspman c. 1930

Maria Elisabeth Aspman (10 March 1865, Stockholm — 4 March 1944, Stockholm) was a Swedish school teacher and headmistress who became a major contributor to improvements in vocational training for women in the early 20th century. After graduating in natural sciences in 1886, she was principal of Stockholm's Klara Folk High School until 1920. As a result of her efforts to reform women's underwear, she met Karolina Widerström, Sweden's first female physician, with whom she had a close relationship over the next 25 years. As members of the Swedish Dress Reform Association, the two collaborated in stressing the importance of sexual hygiene for young people. From 1920 to 1929, Aspman headed Högre Folkskola för Kvinnlig Utbildning, a folk high school devoted to vocational education for women.

== Early life ==
Born in Stockholm on 10 March 1865, Maria Elisabeth Aspman was the daughter of Bernhard Aspman, who managed a gardening nursery, and his wife Maria Ulrika Charlotta née Forsgren. She was one of the family's two daughters. Together with her sister, she attended Widellska flickskolan (Widell Girls' School) and Statens normalskola, a state school associated with teacher training. Specializing in natural sciences, Maria Aspman graduated in teacher training in 1886.

== Career ==
On graduating, Aspman taught at the Klara Folk High School in Stockholm where she remained until 1920. She developed what was known as Aspman's cupboard containing teaching aids including various preparations, minerals and stuffed animals. The idea won a prize at the 1904 St. Louis World's Fair. Aspman continued to improve her knowledge of natural sciences by attending non-graduate courses at Stockholm College and the Karolinska Institute. With the assistance of the politician Kerstin Hesselgren, Aspman established the Högre Folkskola för Kvinnlig Utbildning (Advanced Folk High School for Women's Teacher Training) where she was principal from 1920 to 1929.

As a result of her interest in improving women's underwear, Aspman established a friendship with Sweden's first female physician Karolina Widerström. They lived together for 25 years, both playing an active part in the National Association for Women's Suffrage and stressing the importance of sexual hygiene for young people. The also collaborated in training women to become science teachers. Aspman was successful in helping to introduce health education as a compulsory subject in Swedish elementary schools.

Maria Aspman died in Stockholm of breast cancer in 1944 and was buried in the Northern Cemetery.
