= Astrid Björkman =

Swedish medical doctor

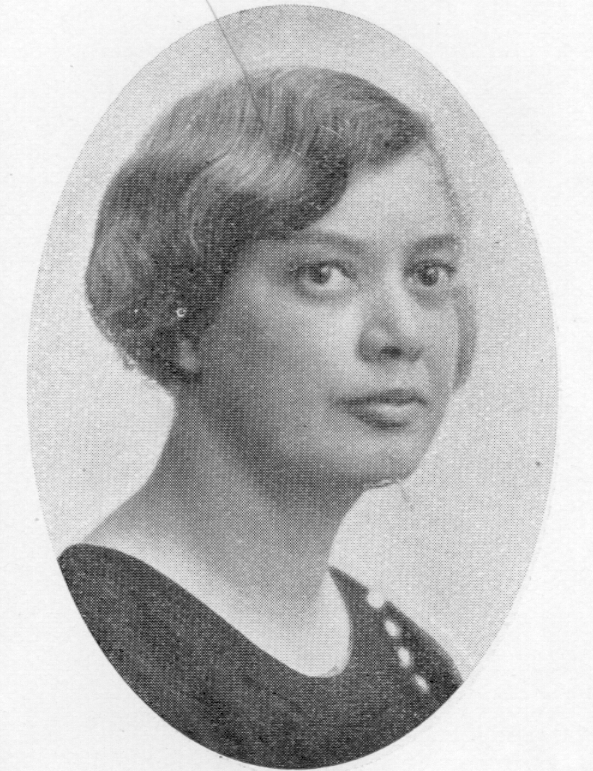
- Born: 9 January 1886; Oskarshamn, Sweden
- Died: 20 January 1967 (aged 81); Uppsala, Sweden
- Occupation: physician

Astrid Carola Björkman (9 January 1886 – 20 January 1967) was a Swedish medical doctor. She was the daughter of the pharmacist Karl Björkman and Matty Egerström, and the cousin of bridge designer Axel Björkman.

Björkman was born in Oskarshamn. She graduated from tertiary school in Stockholm in 1904, and qualified as Licentiate of Medicine at the Karolinska Institute in 1917. She worked as a physician at Uppsala epidemic hospital in 1912, at Säters hospital in 1917, and at Uddevalla Hospital in 1918. During the influenza epidemic, she worked at Borgholm's hospital from 1918 to 1919. Subsequently, she worked at Lund hospital 1919–1927, and at Helsingborg hospital 1927–1930, became chief physician at Källshagens hospital in 1930 and worked as hospital manager there 1931–1936 and at Restad's hospital in Vänersborg 1936–1951. Astrid Björkman was Sweden's first female chief physician and hospital manager. In 1945, she was awarded a ‘size 8’ Illis Quorum gold medal.
