= Rozita Auer =

Swedish belly dancer, actress and singer

- Born: Maud Rozita Auer; 4 August 1952 (age 73); Stockholm, Sweden
- Occupations: Actress, singer, belly dancer

Maud Rozita Auer (born 4 August 1952) is a Swedish belly dancer, actress and singer. She grew up in Gubbängen in Stockholm. Through friends she came into contact with Indian dance and then Turkish dance. She started working as a belly dancer at Klubb Kamelen in Gamla Stan in Stockholm in 1969. Besides doing that she also studied acting at Calle Flygares teaterskola.

As an actress she has participated in several theater plays and has had roles in a number of films and TV-productions. Amongst other plays she has participated in Povel Ramels stage show "Tingel Tangel på Tyro between 1989 and 1990. She became a pioneer in Sweden as the first professional belly dancer, she has also had classes in the art of oriental dance. She is the lead singer of the band Rozita Auer Band.

In 2016, Rozita published her autobiography called I Huvudet på en Magdansös.
