= Mikael Gerdén =

Swedish ice hockey player

- Born: 1 October 1976 (age 49) Stockholm, Sweden
- Height: 6 ft 2 in (188 cm)
- Weight: 178 lb (81 kg; 12 st 10 lb)
- Position: Goaltender
- Shot: Left
- Played for: Huddinge IK; Färjestads BK; Bofors IK; ESV Kaufbeuren
- Playing career: 1996–2004

Mikael Gerdén (born 1 October 1976, in Stockholm) is a retired professional Swedish ice hockey goaltender.

He played three seasons in the Swedish Elite League for Färjestads BK between 2000 and 2003. During that period, he won one Swedish Championship and two runners-up medals. He signed with Kaufbeuren in 2003 when he left Färjestad. But only after one season with them he moved back home and played one season with Skå IK, in the fourth highest league, before he retired from ice hockey.
