= Elsa-Brita Nordlund =

Swedish child-psychiatrist

Elsa-Brita Nordlund (29 April 1903 – 16 April 1987) was the first Swedish child psychiatrist. Her most notable work focused on the humanization of care in children's hospitals.

== Early life and education ==
Nordlund was born on 29 April 1903, in the Katarina Parish in Stockholm, Sweden. Her father was Karl Nordlund who was a senior lecturer at Uppsala University and her mother was Elsa Augusta Nordqvist. Nordlund showed interest in becoming a doctor at a young age. At 16, Nordlund transported Austrian children who were affected by war from Sassnitz, Germany, to Swedish homes as a medical scout.

After graduating from high school in Stockholm in 1922, Nordlund pursued a Bachelor's in Medicine at the Karolinska Institute which she completed in 1928. From 1929 to 1930, she studied child psychiatry in Vienna because child and adolescent psychiatry had yet to be established as a medical discipline in Sweden. Nordlund received her medical license in 1938 from the Karolinska Institute in 1938.

== Career ==
After returning from her studies in Vienna, Nordlund became the first child psychiatrist in Sweden. She was the acting doctor at the Mellansjö School for nervous and maladapted children in Täby, Sweden, until 1934 (she later returned to this position from 1940 to 1946) and a school doctor and part-time teacher at the Highland School in Stockholm for four years. Nordlund also served as a member of Stockholm City's Sex Education Committee and Permanent Abortion Committee. In 1950, she was appointed as chief physician at Norrtull Hospital's counseling office and child psychiatric ward and chief physician at Karolinska Hospital's child psychiatric ward from 1952 to 1969. From 1961 to 1973, Nordlund was the special rapporteur of the Swedish National Board of Medicine (now the National Board of Health and Welfare) for matters in child psychiatry. During this time, she was also a visiting professor at the University of Minnesota Medical School.

While she chiefly worked as a practicing doctor and physician, Nordlund used her extensive clinical knowledge to advocate for the humanization of the care of children in hospitals and clinics. Her efforts emphasized the important effect of external factors on the individual. Nordlund believed that understanding context, relationships and socio-economic status was vital to providing the proper care for a child's symptoms or behavioral problems. Notably, she applied this contextualization aspect of clinical care in the treatment of adolescents with anorexia nervosa. Nordlund went against typical treatments of the time such as routine weight checks and instead sought to understand the emotional functions of symptoms and the contexts in which they arose.

=== Positions held ===
Nordlund held the following positions:

- Acting Doctor at Mellansjö (School for nervous and maladapted children) in Täby 1930-34 and 1940-46
- Acting Doctor at Beckomberga Hospital 1938-40
- School Doctor and Part-time Teacher at Highland School in Stockholm 1940-44
- Acting Doctor at Serafimer Hospital's Neurology Clinic 1941-43
- Volunteer Assistant at Norrtull Hospital's Pediatric Clinic 1943-44
- Member of Stockholm City's Sex Education Committee 1943-46
- Assistant Physician at Stockholm City Advisory Bureau for Educational Issues 1944-47
- Assistant Physician at Norrtull Hospital's Pediatric Clinic 1944, Outpatient assistant 1944–46, member of Criminal Law Committee 1944-1956
- Chairman of the Board of Viggbyholmsskolan, Täby 1945
- Member of Stockholm City Permanent Abortion Committee 1946
- Acting Doctor at Norrtull Hospital's counseling office and child psychiatric ward in 1946, Chief Physician 1950
- Chief Physician at Karolinska Hospital's child psychiatric ward 1952-69
- Special Rapporteur of the Medical Board in child psychiatric matters 1961-73
- Visiting Professor at University of Minnesota Medical School in 1960s

== Selected publications ==
- Nordlund, E.B. (1943) The children and the sexual enlightenment. Hertha
- Nordlund, E.B. (1949). How a Child Guidance Clinic Works. Acta Paediatrica Vol. 38, No 1
- Nordlund, E.B. (1952) Upbringing Problems in a Children's Hospital 1. Acta Paediatrica Vol. 41, No 2
- Wallgren, A., Klackenberg, G., & Nordlund, E.B. (1959) .Child care and pediatric care: a textbook for pediatric nurses. Stockholm: Almqvist & Wiksell
- Stern, E.M., Castendyck, E., Junker, K.S., & Nordlund, E.B. (1957) Children with disabilities: Their upbringing and care: 2 edition. Lund
