= Bo Ancker =

Swedish author and culture reporter

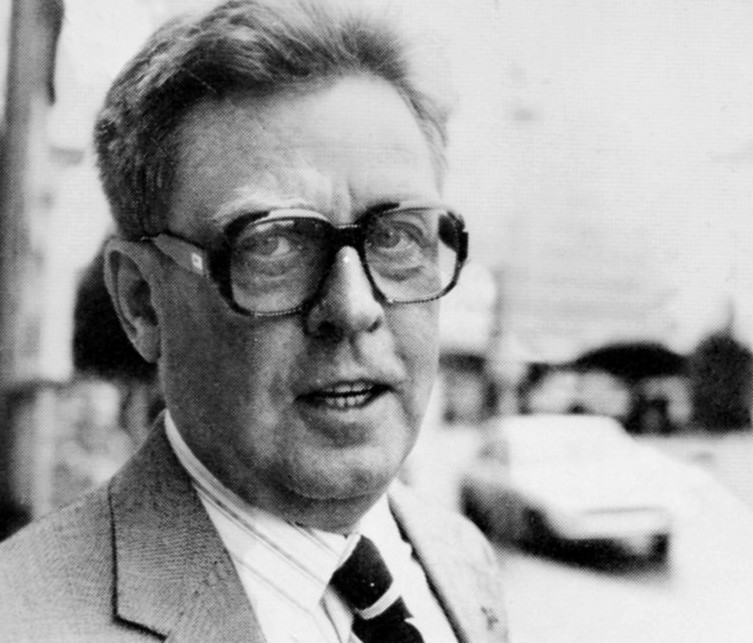

Bo Ancker (26 April 1926 – 10 October 1997) was a Swedish author and reporter. He was a culture reporter at Sveriges Radio between 1952 and 1989.

== Bibliography ==
- 1947 – Det stora reportaget : en bok för pojkar
- 1948 – Spöktåget
- 1954 – Vi på vinden
- 1959 – Ge mig en chans!
- 1965 – Bortom stadens yttersta staket
- 1965 – Mormors porter : Stockholmsminnen från 20-talet
- 1967 – I sommarstaden : en bok om Stockholm
- 1970 – Vaktparaden kommer! : en taktfast rapsodi
- 1972 – Stockholm 1940 : en autentisk rapsodi genom ett kritiskt och händelserikt år ISBN 91-7020-008-4
- 1974 – Ett litet stycke Stockholm : en rapsodi kring Adolf Fredriks församling och de tvåhundra åren 1774–1974 ISBN 91-7080-261-0
- 1977 – 21 promenader i Stockholm. D. 1, Innerstaden ISBN 91-29-50015-X
- 1978 – Turkiska paviljongen : berättelser från Stockholm med omnejd ISBN 91-29-51871-7
- 1979 – 21 promenader i Stockholm. D. 2, Utkanter : i de närmaste omgivningarna ISBN 91-29-53274-4
- 1980 – 21 promenader i Stockholm. D. 3, Vattenvägar : på och utmed våra vattenvägar ISBN 91-29-54101-8
- 1981 – I radions kvarter ISBN 91-522-1621-7
- 1982 – Mörka kroken : berättelser ISBN 91-29-55785-2
- 1988 – Lykttändarens dotter ISBN 91-7024-506-1
- 1989 – Se Skottland : en reseguide ISBN 91-7798-235-5
- 1995 – I hjärtat av Klara ISBN 91-7203-020-8
