= Staël von Holstein =

Baltic German noble family

- Coat of arms
- Country: Holy Roman Empire; Swedish Empire; Russian Empire
- Origin: Westphalia
- Founded: c. 1189
- Historic seat: Holstein Castle
- Titles: Freiherr (Holy Roman Empire); Friherre (Swedish Empire); Baron (Russian Empire)
- Motto: Exemplo suorum

The Staël von Holstein are an ancient German noble family with documented roots in 12th-century Westphalia. Originally taking their name from Holstein Castle in the Bröl valley, its members followed the crusading orders into Livonia in the late Middle Ages. Over eight centuries the family belonged to the nobility of the Holy Roman Empire, the Livonian Knighthood, the Estonian Knighthood, the Swedish House of Nobility, and the Russian imperial nobility.

The family's fortunes were broken and remade many times: its ancestral castle was razed in the feuds of the 13th century, and its knights were defeated at the Battles of Worringen and Grunwald. Later generations endured captivity in Russia during the Livonian War, the loss of their Baltic estates in the Great Northern War, and exile after the Russian Revolution. Among its best-known members are the military engineer Jakob Staël von Holstein, the field marshal George Bogislaus Staël von Holstein, the writer Germaine de Staël, and the painter Nicolas de Staël.

== History ==
=== Medieval origins ===
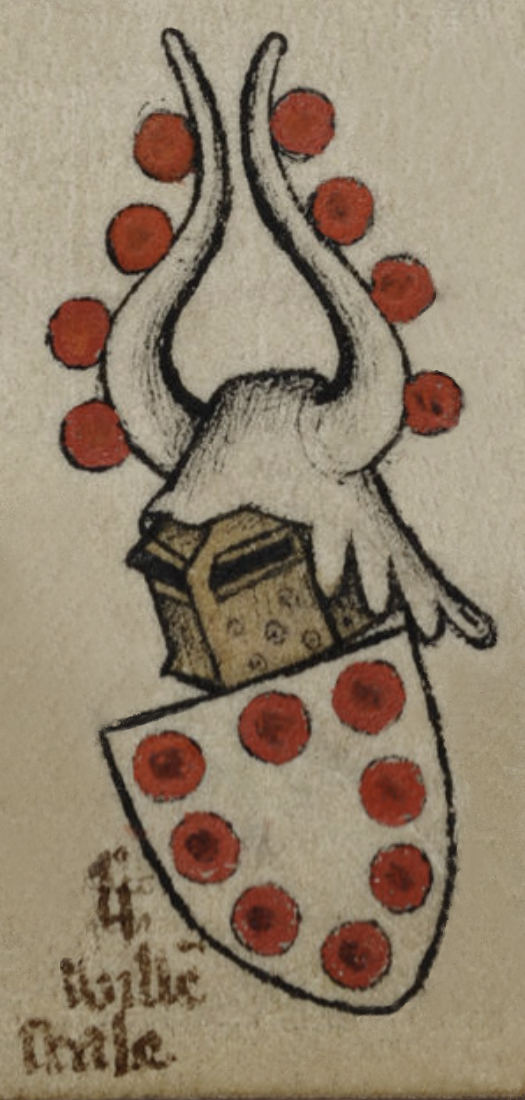
Arms of Wilhelm Staël von Holstein in the Armorial Gelre (c. 1370)

Ludewicus Flecke de Are, the family's earliest known ancestor, is attested in 1189 as a Vogt (advocatus) of Brodenheim, an estate of St. Pantaleon's Abbey, in a charter of Philip I, archbishop of Cologne, Duke of Westphalia and Angria. The family originated as edelfrei (free nobility) before entering ministerial service in the Electorate of Cologne as well as in the county of Are-Hochstaden. Ludewicus' son, the knight Hermannus Flecke de Holstein, served as Mundschenk (pincerna) to the archbishop of Cologne, Konrad von Hochstaden, exercising judicial authority in the archbishop's name. Hermannus' brother, Theodericus, was Vogt of Are Castle. A third brother, Henricus, was lord of Holstein Castle in the Bröl valley, near Nümbrecht, the family's ancestral seat.

By the early 13th century the family's holdings spanned both banks of the Rhine; on the right bank they dominated the confluence of the Sülz and the Agger and the principal military and commercial artery from Cologne through Dortmund and Soest into Westphalia. Fahne judged their position powerful enough to rival that of the Counts of Berg. It is during this period that the arms, a silver shield bearing eight torteaux, first appear in contemporary sources; according to tradition the charge commemorates the family having fed eight castles and their surrounding villages through a severe famine during the Crusades. Although Holstein Castle was destroyed amid the recurring regional feuds of the late 13th century, the family continued to bear the toponymic surname. From 1282 on, the name Flecke was displaced by the byname Stael (also written Stail or Stahl). The name Staël von Holstein therefore translates as "Steel of Holstein".

In 1288 three grandsons of Ludewicus, the knights Henricus, Theodericus, and Henricus called Stail, fought together at the Battle of Worringen on the side of Siegfried II of Westerburg, Archbishop of Cologne, which ended in the archbishop's defeat. In 1290, the brothers released Count Dietrich of Limburg, whom they had captured in an ensuing feud, and swore fealty to Count Adolf of Berg. William, Duke of Berg repeatedly named Wilhelm Staël von Holstein as his trusted vassal, including in his peace settlement with the Archbishop of Cologne in 1396, and for the ducal succession in 1397. His nephew Roprecht, known as der Prächtige ("the Magnificent"), lord of Hardenstein Castle, was councilor of the duke of Cleves, and became Statthalter (governor) of the neighboring County of Mark and the Sauerland. Roprecht's son Rabolt served in the retinue of Duke Gerhard VII of Jülich-Berg, founder of the Order of Saint Hubert; his arms appear six times in the Heroldsbuch des jülich-bergischen Hubertusordens (Herald's Book of the Order of St. Hubert), including in the duke's own miniature. Balduin Staël von Holstein (d. 1410), a knight of the Teutonic Order, rose to Komtur of Strasburg and was among the commanders who fell at the Battle of Grunwald. As the family continued to rank prominently among the knightly houses of the Rhineland, members increasingly followed the crusading orders into the Baltic, establishing new branches in Livonia, the contested region governed by the Livonian Order.

=== Livonia and the crusading orders ===
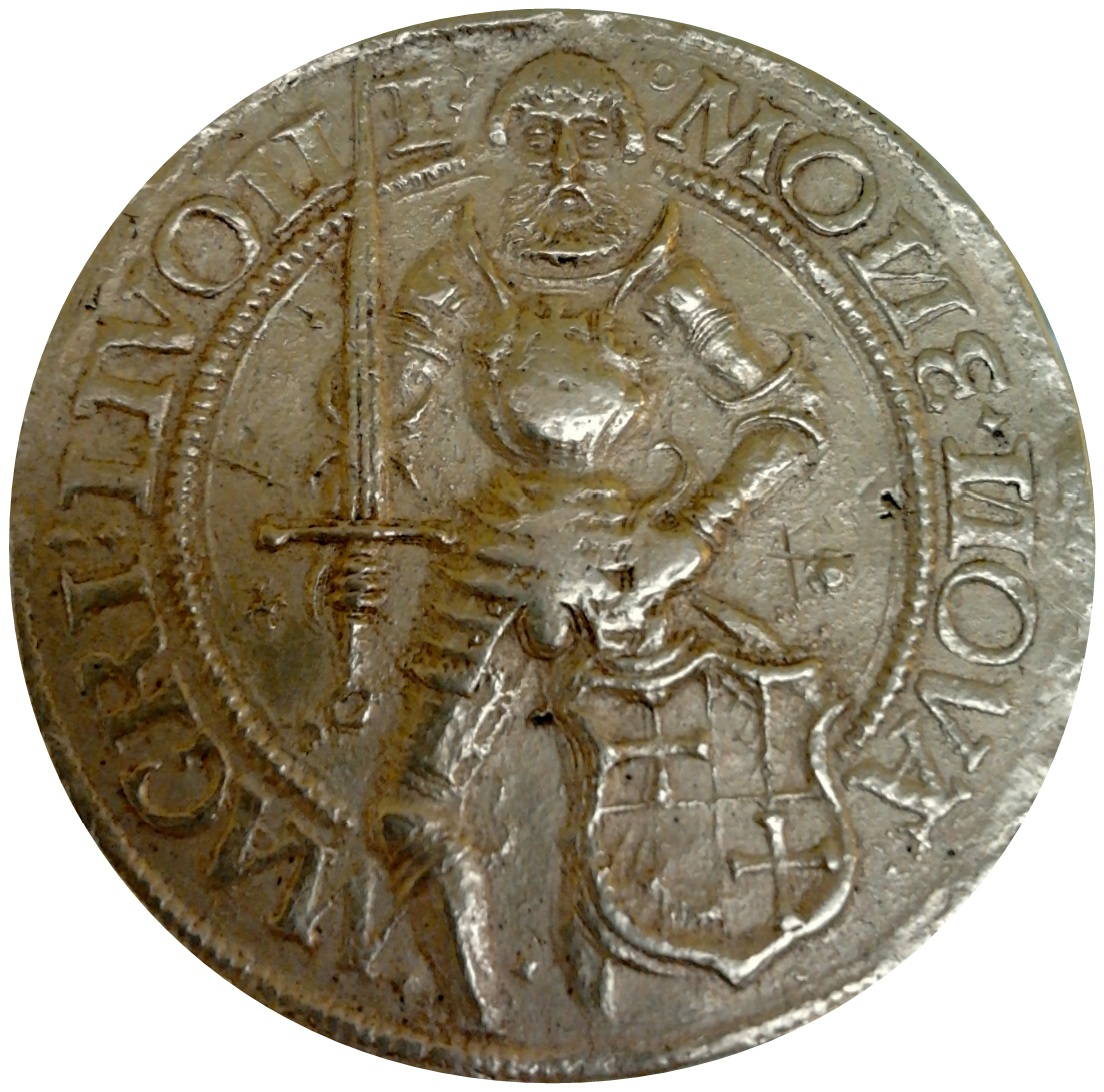
Portugalöser of Livonian Master Wolter von Plettenberg (c. 1525)

The family's service in the Baltic can be traced from the Livonian Brothers of the Sword through that order's absorption into the Teutonic Order in 1237. By the 15th century, members held commanding positions in the Order state, serving as Vögte of key Livonian fortresses and as close advisers to the Livonian Masters. Johann Stael von Holstein (d. 1512), son of Roprecht "the Magnificent", served as Vogt of Wesenberg from 1487 to 1492, then as Vogt of Järvamaa from 1492 to 1511, in what is now central Estonia, and was lord of the Order estates at Torma and Ubja. His nephew Robert Staël von Holstein (c. 1465–1527), settled permanently in Estonia through his marriage to Elsebe von Gilsen, heiress of Sonorm. He became councilor of Livonian Master Wolter von Plettenberg, who dispatched him as emissary to the court of Hans, King of Denmark, and other foreign courts. In 1505 Emperor Maximilian I enfeoffed him with half the County of Dortmund.

The Livonian War (1558–1583) brought catastrophe to the Baltic branch. Hildebrand Staël von Holstein (c. 1535–1587), lord of Teenuse Manor and Pebalg Castle, was captured by Russian forces, transported to Moscow, and held prisoner for seven years before returning to Livonia shortly before his death; his sons Johann and Matthias were left in poverty in Pärnu.

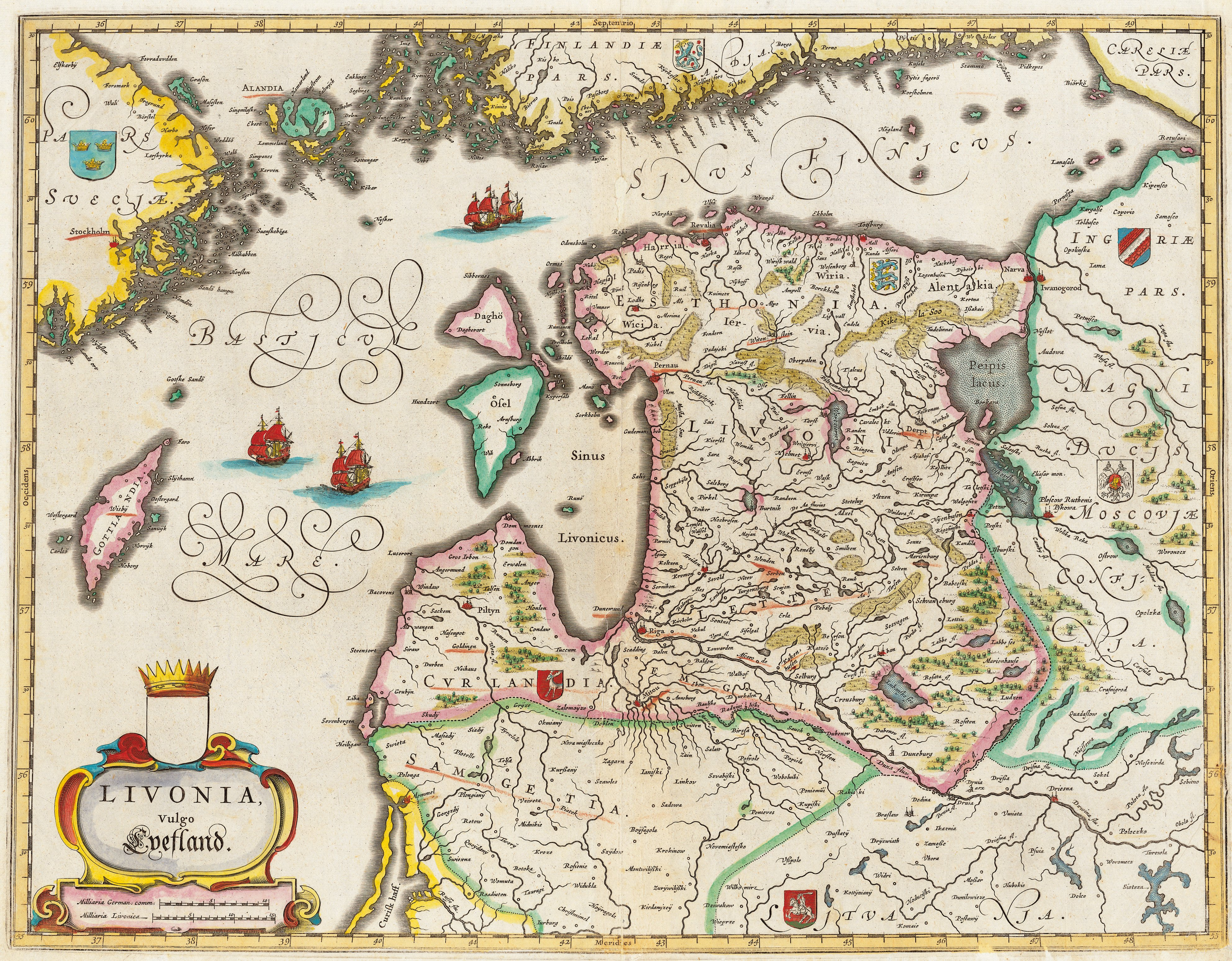
Livonia as depicted in Joan Blaeu's Atlas Maior (1662)

Following the war and the transition to Swedish governance, the brothers rebuilt the family's position. Having forfeited their claim to noble status by engaging in commerce, they were regranted letters of nobility by Queen Christina in 1652, and all surviving sons of both Matthias and Johann were formally introduced at the Swedish House of Nobility in Stockholm in 1675. Jakob Staël von Holstein (1628–1679) was a major general of artillery, director of fortification works in Livonia, Estonia, and Ingria, war councilor, Landmarschall of Livonia (Captain of the Livonian Knighthood), and governor of Reval. His son, Fabian Ernst Stael von Holstein (1672–1730), served as the Captain of the Estonian Knighthood. On 29 September 1710 he signed the knighthood's capitulation to the Russian lieutenant general Rudolf Felix Bauer at Hark near Reval, marking the transition of the Baltic provinces to Russian imperial rule while preserving broad self-government as Baltic Governorates. In 1742 the family was enrolled in the Livonian Knighthood, and in 1745 in the Estonian Knighthood, which declared it "a noble family known since the time of the Livonian Order Masters".

=== Swedish period ===
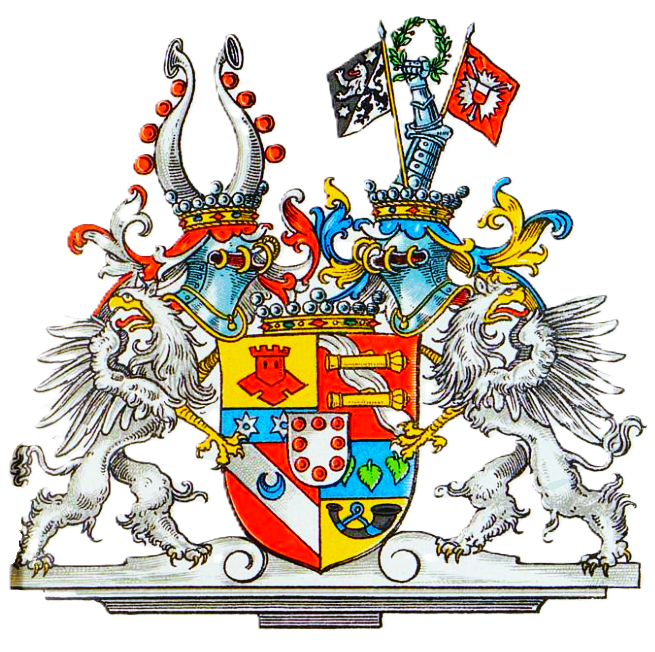
Arms of Baron George Bogislaus Staël von Holstein, Armorial of Westphalian Nobility

With their noble status restored, members of the family rose to prominence in Swedish military and administrative service. Three lines of the family were raised to baronial rank in Sweden: Otto Wilhelm Staël von Holstein in 1719, George Bogislaus Staël von Holstein in 1731 (extinct 1763), and Erik Magnus Staël von Holstein in 1788.

In 1700, George Bogislaus Staël von Holstein (1685–1763) volunteered for the Royal Guard of Charles XII and fought in the Great Northern War, campaigning in Livonia against Russian and Saxon forces. Captured after the fall of Narva, he was held captive in Siberia and near Moscow before being exchanged for a Russian officer in 1711. After his release, George Bogislaus led the counter-attack that repelled Peter Tordenskjold's assault on Nya Elfsborg, and eventually rose to the rank of field marshal. A leading figure of the Caps party during Sweden's Age of Liberty, he was chosen in 1743 to travel to Hamburg to inform Adolf Frederick of his election as heir to the Swedish throne. Together with Anders Koskull, he founded the Kosta Glasbruk glassworks in Småland, Sweden's oldest continuously operating glassworks, known today as Kosta Boda.

=== Diplomacy and the French Revolution ===
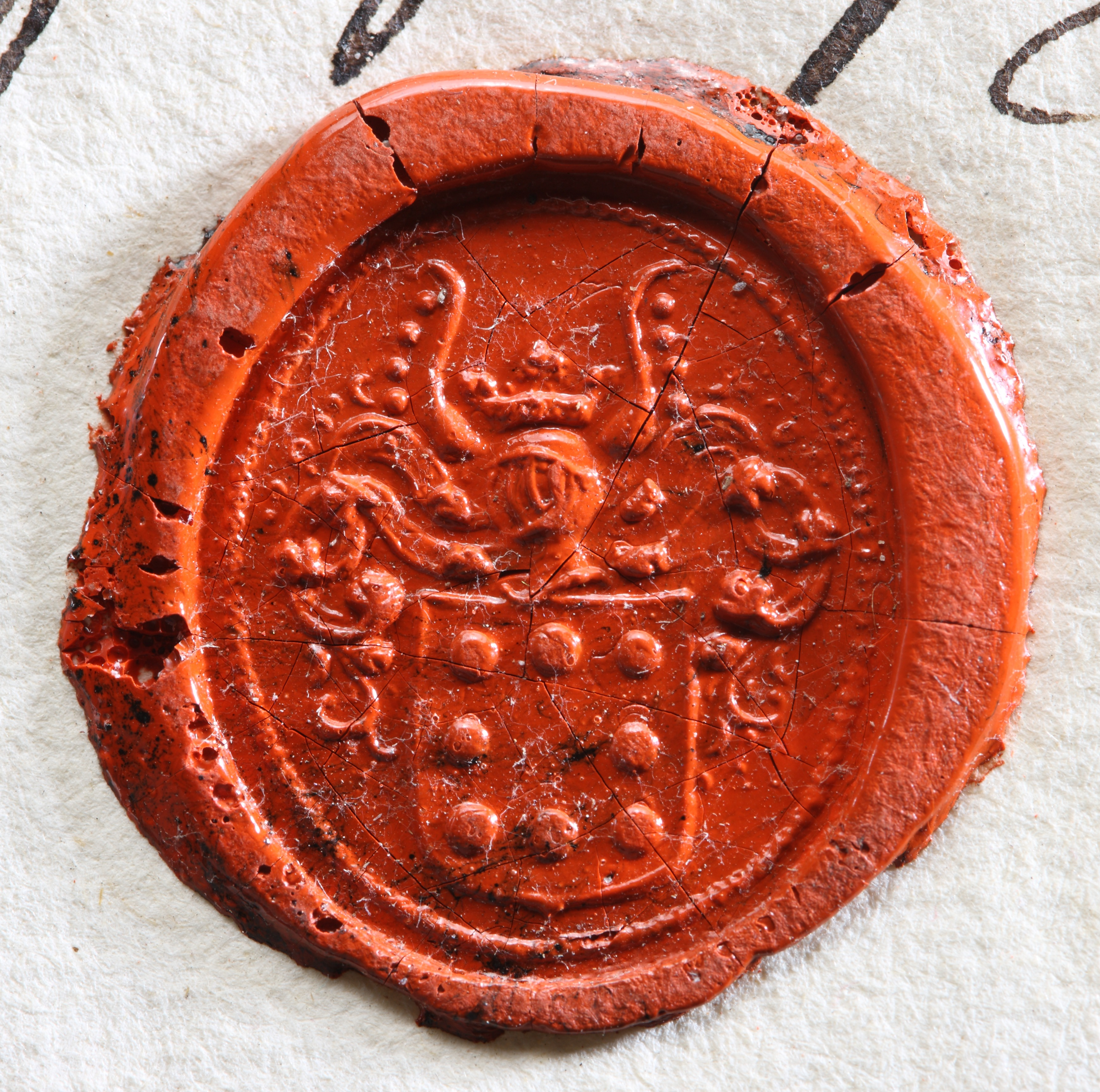
Wax seal of the Staël von Holstein family (18th century)

Baron Erik Magnus Staël von Holstein assisted Gustav III during the Revolution of 1772 and was subsequently appointed Swedish ambassador to France in 1785, where he navigated the final years of the Ancien Régime through most of the French Revolution. In 1786 he married Germaine Necker, daughter of the French finance minister Jacques Necker, in a match brokered with the involvement of Marie Antoinette and the Swedish crown.

A prolific gambler, Erik Magnus was nonetheless regarded by contemporaries as a skilled diplomat. On 23 April 1795 he stood before the National Convention to recognize the French Republic on Sweden's behalf, the first monarchy to do so. His wife Germaine, known as Madame de Staël, became an influential writer and political theorist.

=== The Russian imperial branch ===
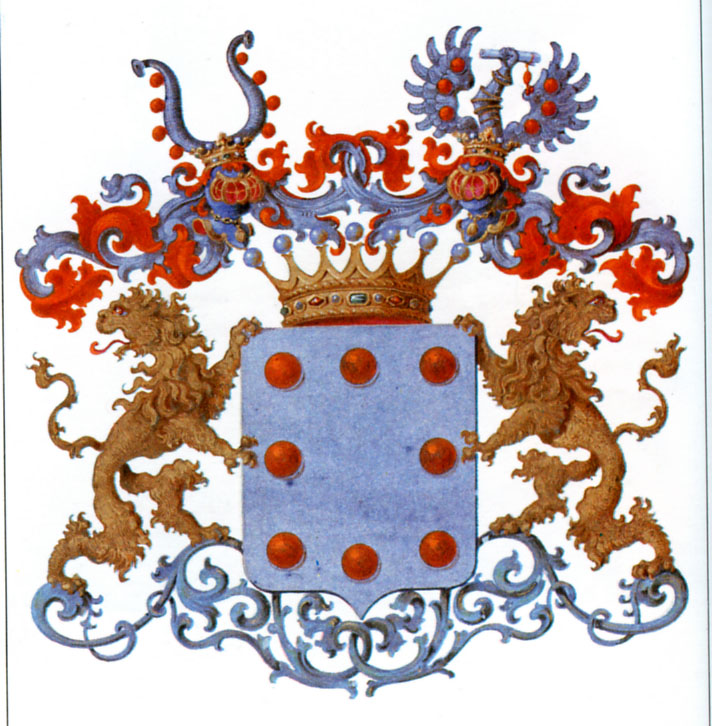
Arms of the Russian baronial line, from the General Armorial of the Noble Families of the Russian Empire (1882)

Following the Great Northern War and Peter the Great's absorption of the Baltic provinces into the Russian Empire, several members of the family entered Russian imperial service. The Estonian line received baronial recognition by Senate ukase No. 942 of 8 March 1869, and the Livonian line by Senate ukase No. 922 of 23 February 1881. Ivan Karlovich Staël von Holstein served as general of cavalry and adjutant general to Tsar Alexander II, and was commander of the 2nd Cavalry Division (1849–1860); he was a recipient of the Order of Saint George (4th class, 1838), the Order of the White Eagle (1859), and the Order of Saint Alexander Nevsky (1864). Other recipients of the Order of Saint George include Boris Yegorovich Staël von Holstein in 1855, and Robert Alexandrovich Staël von Holstein in 1916 (posthumous). In 1911 the family's Bessarabian branch, whose estates derived from a land grant in the Akkerman district, was enrolled in the nobility of the Bessarabian Governorate.

Among the more distinguished members of the Russian branch was Baron Vladimir Ivanovich Staël von Holstein (1853–1921), a lieutenant general who served as the last vice-commandant of the Peter and Paul Fortress in Saint Petersburg. On 12 March 1917, as revolutionary crowds stormed the city's prisons, Vladimir Ivanovich sealed the Peter and Paul Fortress, whose Trubetskoy Bastion was the capital's main political prison. The insurgents laid siege, and the next day a delegation of Duma deputies was admitted through the Saint John Gate, demanding the release of the prisoners.

=== Into the 20th century ===
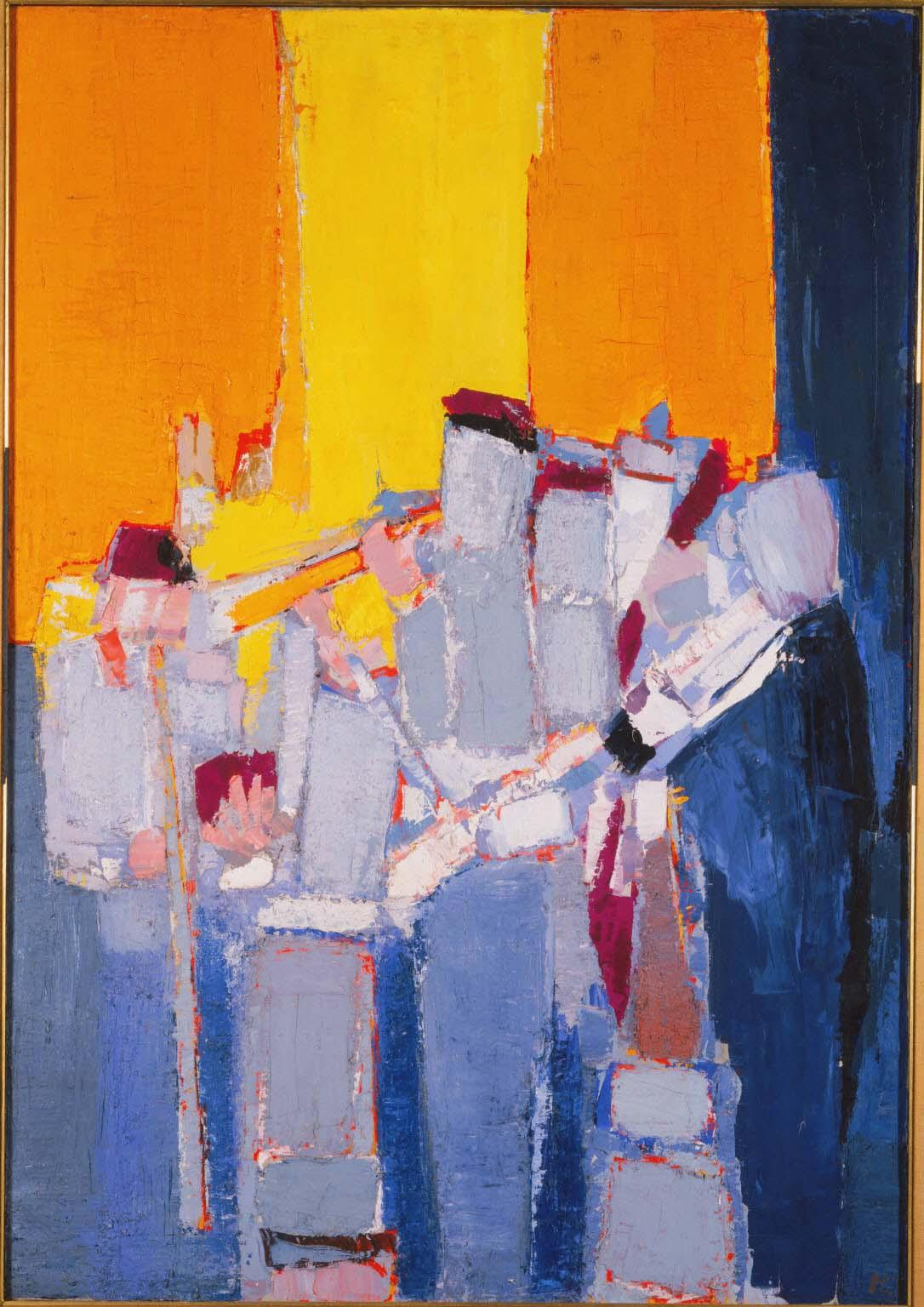
Les Musiciens, souvenir de Sidney Bechet, by Nicolas de Staël (1953)

Like many White Russians, the family was forced into exile; when both Vladimir and his wife Lubov died, the orphans Marina, Nicolas, and Olga were sent to Brussels to be raised by a Russian émigré family. After studying at the Académie Royale des Beaux-Arts and serving in the French Foreign Legion, Nicolas de Staël settled in Paris and emerged as one of the defining painters of post-war Europe.

The family's estates, accumulated over six centuries, were expropriated under Russian, Estonian, Latvian and Romanian land reform following the collapse of the Russian Empire. Baron Alexander Staël von Holstein (1877–1937), born on the family estate of Tõstamaa Manor (Testama) in Livonia, became an internationally recognized orientalist, sinologist, and Sanskritist specializing in Buddhist texts.

In Sweden, Mathilda Staël von Holstein (1876–1953) became the second woman to practice law in the country. A powerful advocate for women's rights, she served on the Ministry of Justice committee whose work produced the Competence Law of 1923, opening government office to women.

=== Branches and current status ===
The family is recorded as Uradel (immemorial nobility) in the Almanach de Gotha. The Rhenish-Westphalian Freiherren branches became extinct in the 19th century. The surviving Swedish and Russian branches both stem from the family's settlement in Livonia in the Late Middle Ages.

The Swedish branch remains centered on Vapnö Castle in Halland, now home to Sweden's largest dairy farm. Kosta Glasbruk, founded in 1742, continues to operate today as Kosta Boda. The Russian branch, scattered by the Revolution of 1917, established itself across Europe, North America, and Asia, with descendants active today in the arts and academia.

== Coat of arms ==
Staël arms in the Armorial Bellenville (c. 1355)

The family's arms are blazoned argent, eight torteaux in orle: three in chief, two on the flanks, and one in base (3-2-2-1). The crest, borne on the helm, is two buffalo horns, each charged on the outer edge with four torteaux; some bearers added a tournament hat or a torse. From the 17th century the arms also appear ensigned with a crown and supported by two lions, two horses, or two griffins.

The arms are recorded in numerous medieval armorials, including the Armorial Gelre, the Armorial Bellenville, the Codex Seffken, the Codex Bergshammar, and the Heroldsbuch des jülich-bergischen Hubertusordens. Some individual members varied the arms. Roprecht (1410–1462) bore rings in place of the roundels, and several members in the 15th and 16th centuries bore coins; marks of cadency include a star in the fess point (Theoderich 1320, Conrad 1333), a tournament label (Daniel 1320), and a bendlet (Johann 1463). The Zündorf cadet line bore the roundels in orle with an escallop in the fess point. Two instances in the Heroldsbuch des jülich-bergischen Hubertusordens show nine torteaux (3-3-2-1).

The family arms were taken into the civic heraldry of several places linked to its estates. The arms of the Essen district of Heisingen include roundels drawn from the Staël arms, recalling the family's lordship of Heisingen Castle. Those of Holzhausen (Georgsmarienhütte) near Osnabrück, granted in 1968, combine the lion of the lords of Varendorff with the eight Staël roundels. In Russia, the arms of Otradnoe in Novousmansky district, Voronezh Oblast, a former Staël estate, bear eight bezants from the family's arms.

Heisingen
(Essen-Heisingen)

Holzhausen
(Georgsmarienhütte,
Osnabrück)

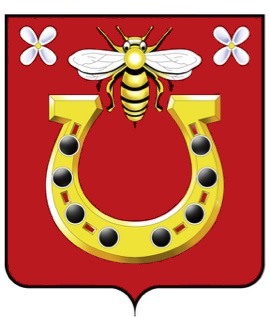
Otradnoe (Novousmansky, Voronezh)

== Notable members ==
- Ludewicus Flecke de Are (fl. 1189–1202), Vogt of Brodenheim, an estate of St. Pantaleon's Abbey; Truchsess of Are and Dahlheim
- Henricus Flecke de Are (fl. 1197–1218), crusader
- Everhardus Flecke de Are (fl. 1207–1220), crusader
- Theodericus Flecke de Are (fl. 1214–1247), Vogt of Are Castle
- Hermannus Flecke de Holstein (fl. 1218–1259), Mundschenk of Archbishop of Cologne, Konrad von Hochstaden; lord of Cuggenheim Castle
- Henricus Flecke de Holstein (fl. 1237–1256), lord of Holstein Castle
- Matthias Flecke de Holstein (fl. 1251–1292), Erbmundschenk of the Archbishopric of Cologne
- Theodericus Flecke de Holstein (fl. 1264–1312), Marschall (marshal) of the Archbishop of Cologne and Erbtruchsess (hereditary steward) of Hochstaden, captured by Count Walram von Jülich at the Battle of Worringen, ransomed himself the following year in exchange for half of an allodial estate at Morat
- Henricus Flecke de Holstein (fl. 1270–1315), Erbhofmeister of the Archbishopric of Cologne, member of the Teutonic Order
- Tilmann Staël von Holstein (d. 1333), knight; killed in a street affray with Cologne citizens in 1333, for which the city paid 150 marks annually in bloodwit to his heirs
- Lutter Staël von Holstein (fl. 1333–c. 1363), son of Tilmann Staël von Holstein; founder of the family's Lanquit and Sülz lines and direct ancestor of all surviving branches of the family
- Wilhelm Staël von Holstein (fl. 1366–c. 1403), Kämmerer, Erbhofmeister, Erbtruchsess of Berg; lord of Sülz and Eulenbroich, his arms appear in the Armorial Gelre, the Codex Seffken, and the Codex Bergshammar
- Balduin Staël von Holstein (d. 1410), Komtur (commander) of the Teutonic Order's Bailiwick of Koblenz (1396–1399) and of Strasburg (1409–1410); Vogt of the Neumark and Schivelbein (1402–1408) and of Grebin (1408–1409); killed at the Battle of Grunwald
- Roprecht der Prächtige ("the Magnificent") Staël von Holstein (c. 1410–1462), lord of Hardenstein Castle, Amtmann (bailiff) of Werden, Bochum, Neustadt and Gummersbach, and Statthalter of Mark and the Sauerland
- Dietrich Staël von Holstein (d. 1450), canon of Münster Cathedral and archdeacon of Warendorf
- Rabolt Staël von Holstein (fl. 1462–1494), lord of Heisingen Castle, Amtmann of Orsoy; his arms appear in the Heroldsbuch des jülich-bergischen Hubertusordens (c. 1480)
- Johann Staël von Holstein (d. 1498), canon and sacristan of Münster Cathedral and dean of Osnabrück Cathedral
- Wilbrand Staël von Holstein (d. 1510), canon of Münster Cathedral and head of the Gymnasium Paulinum (later the Jesuit College of Münster)
- Johann Stael von Holstein (fl. 1460–d. 1512), member of the Livonian Order, Vogt of Rakvere and Järvamaa
- Robert Staël von Holstein (c. 1465–1527), Livonian Order vassal, Hofrichter and councilor of Livonian Master Wolter von Plettenberg, deputy of the Livonian knighthoods of Harrien and Wierland at the assemblies of Rujen and Wolmar (1526)
- Hildebrand Staël von Holstein (c. 1535–1587), major in Polish–Lithuanian service during the Livonian War, lord of Teenuse Manor and Pebalg Castle; died shortly after seven years of Russian captivity in Moscow; progenitor of the family's Swedish branch
- Matthias Staël von Holstein (d. 1649), Bürgermeister of Pärnu
- Jakob Staël von Holstein (1628–1679), Swedish major general of artillery, director of fortification works in Livonia, Estonia, and Ingria, war councilor, Landmarschall of Livonia, and governor of Reval; planned and strengthened the fortifications of Narva, Ivangorod, Riga, and Vyborg; murdered on the open road in 1679, ambushed and shot from behind by Baron Gustav von Mengden and his son, the latter condemned to death by court-martial
- Otto Wilhelm Staël von Holstein (1668–1730), Swedish major general, commander of Holstein infantry forces, colonel of the Adelsfanan (Noble Banner) and the Halland and Uppland Regiments
- Fabian Ernst Staël von Holstein (1672–1730), Swedish lieutenant general and Captain of the Estonian Knighthood
- Jakob Axel Staël von Holstein (1680–1730), Swedish colonel and adjutant general to King Stanislaus of Poland; killed the Danish-Norwegian naval hero Peter Tordenskjold in a duel at Hildesheim in 1720, after Tordenskjold had accused him of being a card cheat
- George Bogislaus Staël von Holstein (1685–1763), Swedish field marshal, governor of Kalmar and Öland Counties (1734–1754) and governor of Malmöhus County (1754–1763), co-founder of Kosta Glasbruk, Commander Grand Cross of the Order of the Sword (1751) and Knight of the Order of the Seraphim (1754)
- Fabian Ernst Stael von Holstein (1727–1772), Captain of the Estonian Knighthood, curator of the Ritter und Domschule zu Reval, and agricultural reformer
- Erik Magnus Staël von Holstein (1749–1802), Sweden's ambassador to France (1785–1793, 1795–1799), Knight of the Order of the Polar Star (1788) and the Order of the Sword (1772); husband of Germaine de Staël.
- Corfitz Ludwig Staël von Holstein (1753–1819), Swedish army captain and leading voice of the liberal opposition in the Riksdag of the Estates (1800–1818); at the Riksdag of 1800 he backed proposals to open ownership of tax-exempt manors to commoners, and remained a persistent critic of royal power and noble privilege through the constitutional crises of 1809–1818
- Karl Gustav Staël von Holstein (1761–1816), Russian Imperial colonel, lord of Kotzum Manor
- Germaine de Staël, née Necker (1766–1817), French writer, political thinker, and leading adversary of Napoleon; known as Madame de Staël
- Auguste-Louis de Staël-Holstein (1790–1827), French writer and abolitionist
- Albertine Staël von Holstein (1797–1838), daughter of Erik Magnus and Germaine de Staël; through her marriage in 1816 to Victor, duc de Broglie, the ancestress of the ducal house of Broglie, including the prime minister Albert, duc de Broglie
- Ivan Karlovich Staël von Holstein (1798–1868), general of cavalry and adjutant general to Tsar Alexander II, commander of the 2nd Cavalry Division (1849–1860); recipient of the Order of Saint George (1838), the Order of the White Eagle (1859), and the Order of Saint Alexander Nevsky (1864); his daughters married into the comital and princely houses of Toulouse-Lautrec and Gagarin
- Otto Wilhelm Staël von Holstein (1802–1884), Swedish justice of the Supreme Court, Consultative State Councilor, and Postmaster General of Sweden
- Olga Alexandrovna Staël von Holstein (1837–1892), Countess Cancrin, married Count Valerian Cancrin in 1853. Their daughter Alexandra (1856–1934) married Count Matvey Ivanovich Tolstoy and, later, Philip Stanhope, 1st Baron Weardale
- Boris Yegorovich Staël von Holstein (fl. 1855), Russian major general, recipient of the Order of Saint George (4th class, 1855)
- Vladimir Ivanovich Staël von Holstein (1853–1921), Russian lieutenant general, last Imperial vice-commandant of the Peter and Paul Fortress (1908–1917); recipient of the Order of Saint Vladimir (2nd class, 1915) and the Order of the White Eagle (1916)
- Alexei Ivanovich Staël von Holstein (1858–1941), Russian lieutenant general, steward to Grand Duke Peter Nikolaevich (1889–1905); recipient of the Order of Saint Vladimir (1915), died in exile in Rome
- Mathilda Staël von Holstein (1876–1953), Swedish lawyer and women's rights advocate; second woman to practice law in Sweden and recipient of the Illis quorum (1946)
- Alexander Staël von Holstein (1877–1937), Estonian orientalist, sinologist and indologist; taught at Peking University (1918–1929), Honorary Fellow of the Institute of History and Philology of Academia Sinica (1932)
- Nicolas de Staël (1914–1955), Russian-born French painter, born in the Peter and Paul Fortress
- Stephen Ujlaki (b. 1943), American documentary filmmaker; nephew of Nicolas de Staël

== Former estates ==
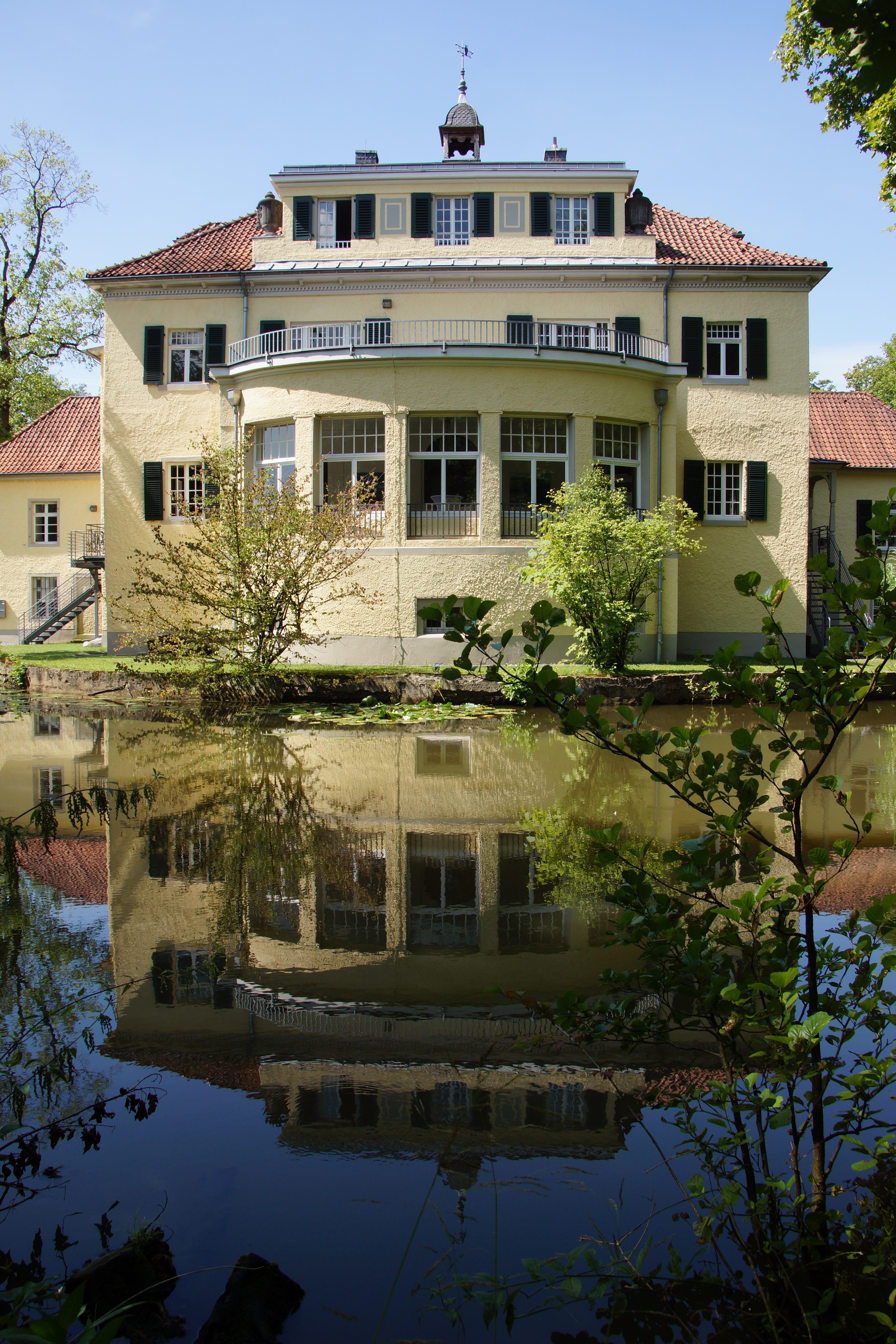
Eulenbroich Castle, Rösrath

Over more than eight centuries the family accumulated landed estates across Central, Northern, and Eastern Europe. From their ancestral seat at Holstein Castle in the Bröl valley, they held dozens of castles and fortified manors across the Rhineland and Westphalia, among them Eulenbroich Castle, Sutthausen Castle, and Steinhausen Castle.

From the late 15th century the Baltic branches held extensive estates across Livonia, Estonia, and Ingria, including Staëlenhof, Anija Manor, Kotzum Manor, and Tõstamaa Manor, all retained until the Estonian and Latvian land reforms.

The Russian branch acquired estates in Saint Petersburg, the Voronezh Governorate, and the Akkerman district of the Bessarabian Governorate, lost after 1917.

The Swedish branch's Vapnö Castle in Halland, purchased in 1741, remains in the family and is today the seat of Sweden's largest dairy farm.
