= Eva Andén =

Swedish lawyer (1886–1970)

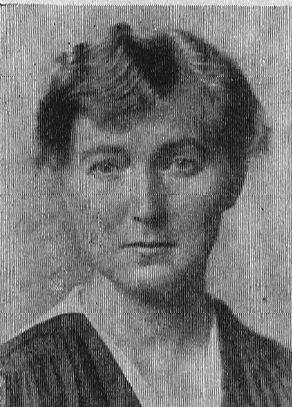
- A portrait of Eva Johanna Andén.
- Born: Eva Johanna Andén; 23 April 1886; Uppsala, Sweden
- Died: 26 March 1970 (aged 83); Danderyd, Stockholm, Sweden
- Burial place: Uppsala Old Cemetery, Uppsala, Sweden
- Education: Uppsala University (Candidate of Law)
- Occupation: Lawyer
- Years active: 1912–1970
- Organization: Swedish Bar Association
- Known for: First woman member of the Swedish Bar Association
- Partner: Lisa Ekedahl

Eva Johanna Andén (23 April 1886 – 26 March 1970) was a Swedish lawyer. She became the first woman member of the Swedish Bar Association on 14 March 1918.

== Early life and education ==
Andén was born in 1886 to merchant Heribert Andén and Elin Forssman. She had a brother named Anders Andén. Graduating secondary school in 1906, she enrolled in law at Uppsala University, as the only female member of her class. She had a interest in improving the legal status of children and women and received guidance from her mentor, Elsa Eschelsson, a lecturer in civil law.

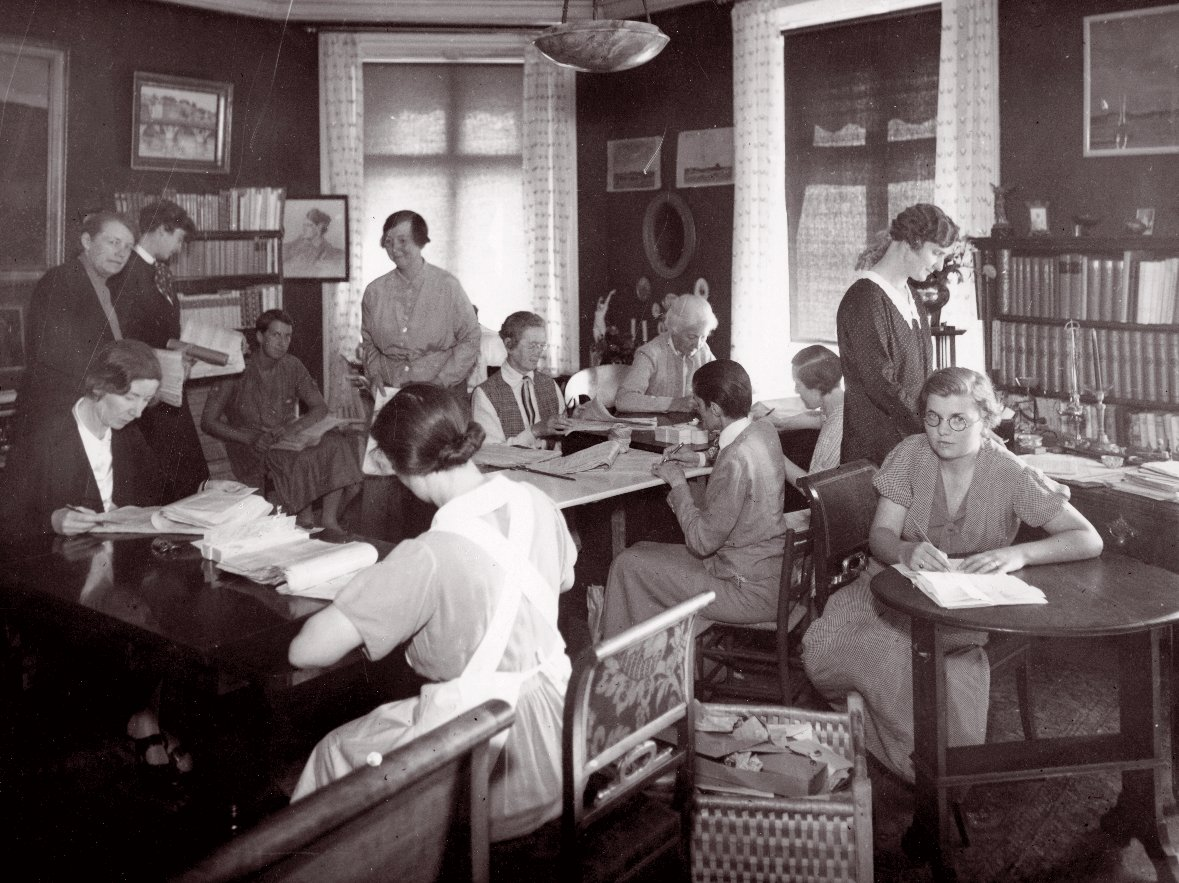
Editorial office of the weekly magazine Tidevarvet. Andén is standing in front of the window (1935).

== Career ==
Andén graduated in 1912 and became a lecturer in law. In 1912–1913, she toured Sweden and gave legal lectures on behalf of the National Association for Women's Suffrage (Sweden).Because of her gender, she was not allowed to work as a lawyer, but she managed to secure a position as a court clerk under the district judge in Falun between 1913–1914. With the help of her credentials from there, she was able to become an intern in Stockholm at the law firm Morssing & Nycander, owned by Johan Tjerneld, secretary of the Swedish Bar Association. As an intern, she was required to state during her work in court that she was unmarried, since a married woman was considered legally incompetent and needed her husband’s permission to work. It was not until the Qualifications Act of 1925 (Behörighetslagen), which granted equal status to male and female civil servants, that this provision was finally abolished.

In 1915, she took over the Women's Law Office of Anna Pettersson in Stockholm. In 1918, she was accepted as a member of the Swedish Bar Association following her application. The Association had no formal barriers barring women from becoming members, but the situation was cited as "exceptional". The Bar Association’s minutes from March 14, 1918, noted that: “Miss Eva Andén would be the first woman to gain admission to the Swedish Bar Association, and a press release would be issued regarding this.” After Andén was admitted as a member of the Bar Association, the name of her firm was changed to Eva Andén’s Law Office. The second woman lawyer in Sweden, Mathilda Staël von Holstein, practiced in her firm in 1919–1923.

Andén had a successful career until her death, and was particularly engaged in cases of divorce, allowance and other cases involving women and children. Barbro Alving, Selma Lagerlöf and Astrid Lindgren were among her clients. She was a member of the government's state legal committee which advised the government in the law reforms regarding women and children, which underwent major reforms during the year in which women's suffrage was introduced, and she contributed to the reforms in which the rights of children out of wedlock were strengthened (1917) and the reformed marriage law in which married women were freed from the legal guardianship of their husbands in 1920–1921.

== Personal life ==
She often contributed articles in the press, regarding the law and women's rights in issues of marriage, inheritance, abortion and prostitution. During the 1920s and 1930s she was a regular contributor to the liberal feminist weekly magazine Tidevarvet. She never married, but lived with the legal secretary Lisa Ekedahl for many years. She had many friends, among them Aleksandra Kollontai, Karolina Widerström and Ellen Fries. Andén served as chairman of the literary society Samfundet De Nio from 1949 to 1962.

== See also ==
- First women lawyers around the world
