= Lisa Ekedahl =

Swedish lawyer and campaigner for women's suffrage

Maria Elisabeth "Lisa" Ekedahl (16 July 1895 Växjö – 18 January 1980 Danderyd) was a Swedish lawyer and campaigner for women's suffrage. Her partner was Eva Andén, the first female member of the Swedish Bar Association. Ekedahl too was one of the first women in Sweden who worked with law. She started as a secretary at Andén's law firm around 1920, but she had not been allowed by her family to take the studentexamen, so she never received a law degree. Nevertheless, she worked with Andén throughout her professional life.
