= Mathilda Staël von Holstein =

Swedish lawyer and women's rights activist (1876–1953)

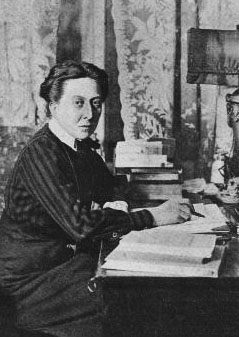
- Staël von Holstein in 1914
- Born: Christina Mathilda Staël von Holstein; 30 May 1876; Kristianstad, Sweden
- Died: 2 November 1953 (aged 77); Stockholm, Sweden
- Education: University College of Stockholm (jur.kand.)
- Occupations: Lawyer; teacher
- Partner: Ingegerd Palme
- Awards: Illis quorum (1946)

Christina Mathilda Staël von Holstein (30 May 1876 – 2 November 1953) was a Swedish lawyer, teacher and women's rights activist. Admitted to the Swedish Bar Association in 1921, she was the second woman to qualify as a lawyer in Sweden, after Eva Andén, with whom she was then in partnership. She sat on the government committee whose work produced the Competence Act of 1923, which opened state employment to women, and chaired the standing legal committee of the International Council of Women from 1938 to 1947.

== Early life and education ==
Staël von Holstein was born in the garrison parish of Kristianstad, the eldest of thirteen children of Colonel Axel Olof Staël von Holstein (1848–1908) and Cecilia Nordenfeldt (1854–1929). Her father's postings moved the family repeatedly, and she grew up partly at Björneborg ironworks in Värmland. She attended the girls' secondary school in Kristianstad from 1892 and took commercial school courses in Stockholm in 1901–02. Her father died in August 1908, after which she helped her mother support the younger children.

She worked as a correspondent at a Stockholm law firm from 1902 and then in municipal administration, including as amanuensis and acting treasurer at the city health board. Wanting more qualified work, she prepared for university by private tuition and self-study, obtained a dispensation from the studentexamen requirement she had never met, and enrolled at the University College of Stockholm in 1909, studying law while employed full-time. She took her juris kandidat degree on 20 April 1918, the tenth woman in Sweden to do so.

== Legal career ==
Staël von Holstein entered practice in 1919 as a partner of Eva Andén, the two trading as Andén och Staël von Holstein, and in 1921 was admitted to the Swedish Bar Association as its second female member, Andén having been admitted in 1918. The partnership ended in 1923, when she opened her own Stockholm firm, which she ran until 1945. Her biographer Magnus Ullman writes that both women were marked by the case of the Uppsala legal scholar Elsa Eschelsson, whose obstruction by the university and subsequent suicide made her a reference point for the first generation of Swedish women lawyers.

She combined family law with property law, the latter her particular field. In family matters she acted mainly in divorces, handling maintenance, custody, adoption and the division of marital property under the intricate provisions of the 1921 Marriage Code. Ullman describes her as exacting, demanding of herself and of her junior lawyers, but generous in sharing her expertise with younger colleagues.

== Women's rights and public life ==
A liberal in politics, Staël von Holstein sat on the board of the Stockholm branch of the National Association for Women's Suffrage from 1907 to 1909, was vice chair of the Women's Clerks' and Shop Assistants' Association from 1910 to 1918, where she laid the foundations of its work on women's rights, chaired the Stockholm Women's Students' Association in 1913–14, and from 1912 handled legislative questions for the Fredrika Bremer Association, later serving as its treasurer. She was a member of Stockholm City Council from 1919 to 1923.

Swedish law then restricted appointment to state office to a "Swedish man". In 1919 the government appointed a committee to remove the barrier, chaired by Emilia Broomé and the first Swedish royal committee led by a woman. Staël von Holstein served on it for the Association of University Women and the Fredrika Bremer Association. It reported in February 1920, and its work produced the Competence Act of 1923, which made women eligible for state employment on the same terms as men, excepting military and police posts and the priesthood. The fiercest resistance concerned senior and judicial appointments; she later recalled objections such as the claim that a young woman judge's silk-stockinged legs would distract counsel and the public, which she dismissed as nödargument, arguments of desperation.

She taught economics and civics for some twenty years at the elementary teachers' seminary in Stockholm and, like Andén, lectured on law and economics around the country. From 1938 to 1947 she chaired the standing legal committee of the International Council of Women, and in 1946 she was awarded the royal medal Illis quorum.

== Personal life ==
Staël von Holstein never married. For many years she shared a household with Ingegerd Palme, an estate agent who ran the property firm Tornet and was herself well known in the women's movement; the Svenskt kvinnobiografiskt lexikon describes Palme as her life companion. She had given up practice several years before her death in Stockholm on 2 November 1953. Letters from her are held at the university libraries of Gothenburg and Lund.

== Selected works ==
- Staël von Holstein, Mathilda (1908). Målsmanskapet och kvinnans ställning inom äktenskapet enligt gällande svensk rätt. Skrifter utgivna av centralstyrelsen i Landsföreningen för kvinnans politiska rösträtt (in Swedish). Vol. 3. Stockholm: Ekman.
- Staël von Holstein, Mathilda (1911). Vår äktenskapslagstiftning. Några synpunkter och önskemål (in Swedish). Stockholm.
- Staël von Holstein, Mathilda (1942). Kommentar till nya hyresregleringslagen (in Swedish). Stockholm: Fritzes bokförlag.

She also wrote for Social tidskrift and contributed some twenty-three pieces to the Fredrika Bremer Association's journal Hertha between 1915 and 1944.

== See also ==
- Eva Andén
- Anna Pettersson
