= Robert Staël von Holstein =

Councillor to the Master of the Livonian Order

Robert Staël von Holstein (born after 1455; died August 1527) was a Westphalian nobleman in Livonia, where he served as court judge and later councillor to the Master of the Livonian Order. In 1505 Emperor Maximilian I enfeoffed him with half the county of Dortmund. He acted as deputy of the knighthood of Harrien and Wierland at the diets of Wolmar in 1525 and 1526, where he spoke for the Livonian estates in the proceedings against Archbishop Johannes Blankenfeld.

== Family and origins ==
Robert was a son of Neveling Staël von Holstein and Maria von Eickell. His mother's first husband had been Heinrich von Lindenhorst, Stadtgraf of Dortmund.

His uncle, Johann Staël von Holstein, had served the Livonian Order as Vogt of Wesenberg and then of Jerwen between 1487 and 1511.

== Career in Livonia ==
Robert came to Livonia around 1490, and was at first Landsknecht of the convent estate of Kuimetz in Harrien. In 1499 he married Elsebe von Gilsen, heiress of Sonorm, whose family had itself come to Livonia through kinship with officials of the Order.

In the same year he was court judge (Hofrichter) to the Master of the Order Wolter von Plettenberg and travelled on his behalf to the court of Hans, King of Denmark. In the years that followed he was repeatedly sent to Germany "on the business of the Master and of the land", and by 1519 he was a councillor of the Master.

On 12 August 1505, Emperor Maximilian I enfeoffed him with half the county of Dortmund as Lehnsträger (feudal trustee) for his half-sister Katharina von Lindenhorst. In the same year Werden Abbey enfeoffed him with the manors of Gensind and Halswigk, which remained with the family until the end of the 17th century, along with the house of Zern near Dortmund. His principal residence remained Livonia, where from 1524 he held the estate of Mees in Harrien in addition to Sonorm.

== The diets of Wolmar ==
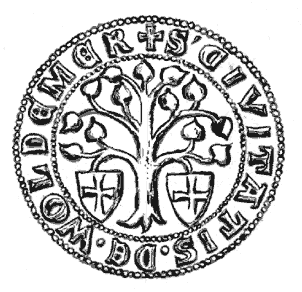
Coat of arms of the city of Wolmar as part of the State of the Teutonic Order

Since Livonia had no single sovereign, the Order, the bishoprics and the larger towns governed by continual negotiation. Johannes Blankenfeld, a Berlin patrician who became Archbishop of Riga in 1524, sought Moscow's help against his Livonian opponents in 1525.

At the diets of Wolmar in 1525 and 1526 Robert Staël represented the knighthood of Harrien and Wierland and spoke for the estates in the proceedings against the archbishop, whom they accused of treason. He is credited with the remark that Blankenfeld possessed "list und bohendicheit nach den Römischen stucken, de he mer kan, den dysen landen gudt ist" (cunning and craftiness after the Roman fashion, of which he knows more than is good for these lands).

Blankenfeld submitted, left Livonia in 1526 and died the following year, leaving the Order under Wolter von Plettenberg the dominant power in the country.

== Death ==
Robert Staël von Holstein died in August 1527, leaving two daughters. Anna married Gisbert von Boelswinge, of the Westphalian house of Bodelschwingh; Margaretha married Johann von Rosen of Schönangern and, after his death, Johann Dücker.

== Sources ==
- Arbusow, Leonid (ed.). Akten und Rezesse der livländischen Ständetage (in German). Vol. 3.
- Genealogisches Handbuch der estländischen Ritterschaft (in German). Vol. 1. Görlitz: C. A. Starke. 1931.
- Russwurm, Carl (1877). Nachrichten über das adeliche und freiherrliche Geschlecht Staël von Holstein, estländischer Linie: Urkunden und Regesten (in German).
