= Balduin Staël von Holstein =

Teutonic Order commander (died 1410)

Balduin Staël von Holstein (also recorded as Baldewin Stal and Baldwin von Stahl; died 15 July 1410) was a knight commander of the Teutonic Order who came from Westphalian and Rhenish nobility. Komtur of Strasburg from 1409, he was killed at the Battle of Grunwald.

== Early life ==
From the thirteenth century onward members of the Staël von Holstein family followed the crusading orders into the Baltic; the family's surviving branches were established in Livonia. Balduin instead made his career in the State of the Teutonic Order, in Prussia and the Neumark.

== Career ==
He is first recorded as Komtur of the Order's Bailiwick of Koblenz, one of the Kammerballeien reserved to the Grand Master, from 24 July 1396 to 15 December 1399.

The Order took the Neumark in pledge from Sigismund of Luxembourg in 1402, and Balduin was appointed its Vogt in that year, holding at the same time the older vogtei of Schivelbein. His letters to the Grand Master were issued from Samter, Dramburg, Schivelbein and, by June 1407, Soldin.

He left the Neumark in August 1408 to become Vogt of Grebin in the Vistula delta, an office he held until 15 December 1409. He was then appointed Komtur of Strasburg, succeeding Gottfried von der Kühle; the commandery had been held a few years earlier by Friedrich von Wallenrode, later Grand Marshal of the Order.

== Battle of Grunwald ==
Banner of Strasburg at the Battle of Grunwald

Balduin was killed at the Battle of Grunwald on 15 July 1410. Jan Długosz's Banderia Prutenorum (1448), which depicts the banners taken by the Poles in the battle, names him as leader of the banner of the commandery and town of Strasburg, listing it twenty-first and describing it as bearing a red stag on a white field.

Strasburg castle was not stormed after the battle. Its townspeople surrendered it to the Polish army, and it returned to the Order under the First Peace of Thorn on 1 February 1411.
