= George Bogislaus Staël von Holstein =

Swedish baron (1685–1763)

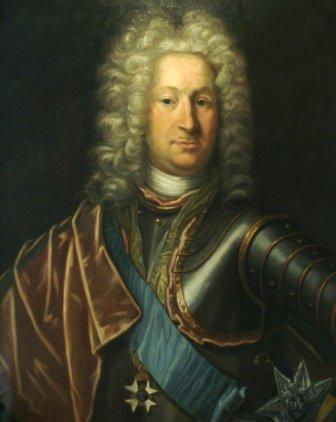
George Bogislaus Staël von Holstein

George Bogislaus Staël von Holstein (6 December 1685 in Narva – 17 December 1763 in Malmö) was a Swedish baron and field marshal who served as Governor of Malmöhus County from 1754 until his death.

== Family ==
Staël von Holstein was the son of Lieutenant Colonel Johan Staël von Holstein and Helena Juliana von der Pahlen. He belonged to the Staël von Holstein noble house, which was naturalized into the Swedish House of Nobility in 1652.

While a prisoner of war in Russia, he married Countess Ingeborg Christina Horn af Rantzien in 1710. She was a daughter of Field Marshal Henning Rudolf Horn af Rantzien, who had been taken captive together with his daughters during the Great Northern War. Staël von Holstein was exchanged for a Russian officer in 1711, but Ingeborg remained in captivity for another decade; his engagement to Sofia Elisabeth Ridderschantz in 1722 ended when she unexpectedly returned. He married Ridderschantz only after Ingeborg's death in 1761. His only daughter, Anna Helena Juliana, died in childhood, and the baronial line he had founded in 1731 died with her.

== Military career ==
Staël von Holstein entered the army on 20 February 1700 as a volunteer in the royal Life Guards, and was promoted to sergeant in the artillery the following year. As a cornet in Otto Vellingk's Ingrian Dragoon regiment he took part in the campaigns in Livonia against the Russian and Saxon armies. He was commissioned lieutenant in 1702 and, in 1703, captain in the infantry regiment of Adam de la Gardie. When that regiment was sent in 1704 to relieve Narva, then besieged by Russian forces, he was given command of its grenadier company.

The Swedish attack failed and Staël von Holstein was captured, spending years in prison camps in Siberia and later near Moscow before securing his exchange for a Russian officer in 1711. On his return he was appointed major in the Skaraborg Regiment by order of Charles XII, then in exile at Bender. He was promoted lieutenant colonel in 1713, colonel in 1717, and in 1718 led his regiment in the Norwegian campaign and the Siege of Fredriksten.

In 1719 the Skaraborg regiment was garrisoned in the fortress of Nya Elfsborg in Gothenburg under commander Johan Abraham Lillie, when the fortress was attacked by the Danish captain Peter Wessel Tordenskiold. Staël von Holstein led the artillery counter-attack that repelled Tordenskiold's assault and forced his fleet to withdraw.

Returning to Swedish service, he was made colonel and commandant of Kalmar Castle in 1733, governor of Kalmar and major general in 1734, and lieutenant general in 1743; that year he was sent to Hamburg to inform Adolf Frederick of his election as heir to the throne. A leading figure of the Caps, he was invested as a Knight of the Royal Order of the Seraphim in 1754, appointed governor of Malmöhus County and commandant of Malmö Castle the same year, and raised to field marshal in 1756, with seniority backdated to 1753.

== Civilian life ==
Staël von Holstein established a textile manufactory at Kalmar in 1737, and in 1742 he and Anders Koskull, governor of Kronobergs län, founded the Kosta Glasbruk glassworks, whose name combines the first syllables of their surnames. He also acquired the estate of Vapnö in Halland, which remains in the family's hands.
