= Codex Seffken =

Late 14th-century armorial manuscript

- Library of the Herold society, Berlin
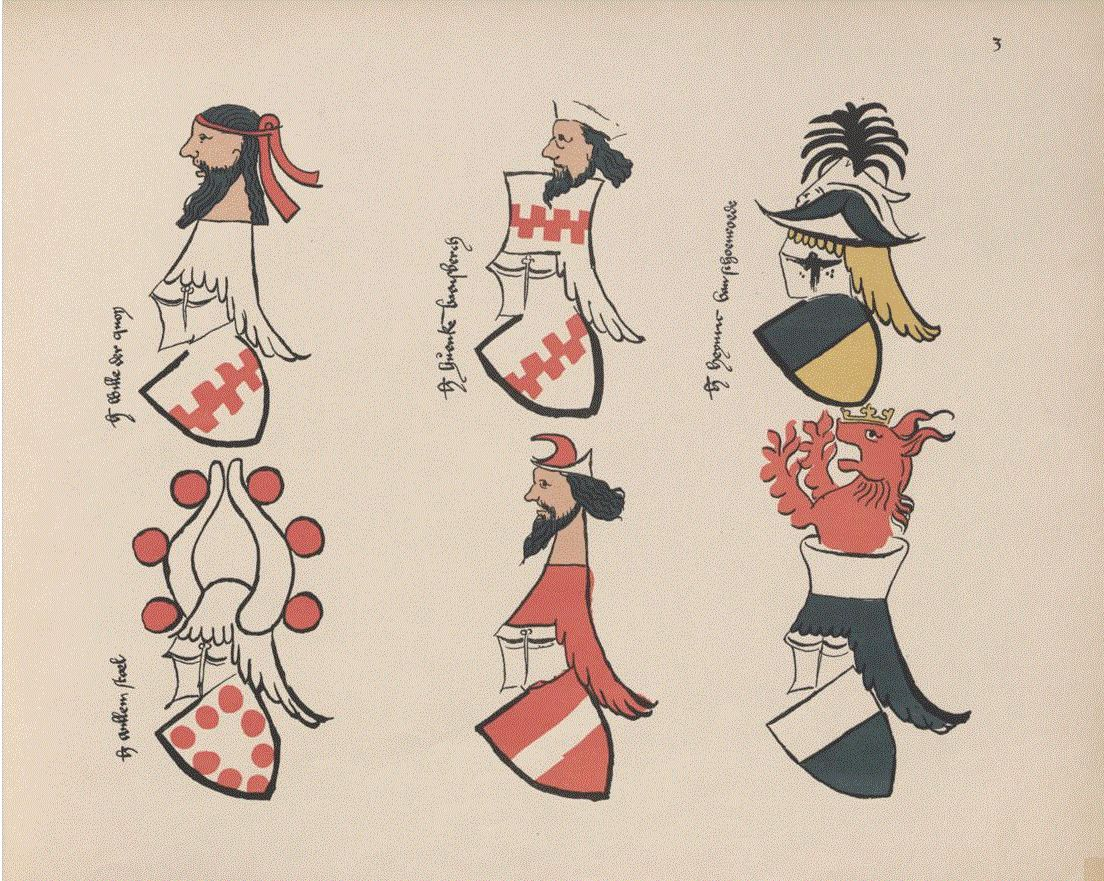
- folio 3r
- Date: late 14th century
- Size: 77 leaves
- Accession: B.109

The Codex Seffken, properly the Wappenbuch von den Ersten (German for "armorial of the foremost"), is an armorial manuscript of the late 14th century. It is a paper folio with six coats of arms to a page, many of them left unexecuted or unidentified. It is held by the Berlin heraldic society Herold under the shelfmark B.109 and is cited in heraldic scholarship by the siglum ERS. Gustav Adelbert Seyler described it in 1895 as the oldest known heraldic manuscript after the Zürich armorial.

== Name ==
The usual name derives from an inscription on the edge of the block of leaves, which Count Rudolf von Stillfried-Rattonitz read as Wappenbouch von den Sefken, mistaking the letter sequence Erssten for Seffken. The reading was corrected in 1892 by the heraldist Carl Teske and the librarian Antonius van der Linde, who took the disputed characters for Erssten, a reading supported by the contents of the book, understood to present the foremost lineages.

== Rediscovery and dating ==
The manuscript was offered for sale in about 1855 to Stillfried-Rattonitz, who was outbid by a purchaser he was never able to identify. His public appeal for its whereabouts, published in 1871 in the Anzeiger für Kunde der deutschen Vorzeit, went unanswered. In November 1891 Seyler received the book on approval from a South German antiquarian and identified it from a specimen sheet the count had copied. He then had it bought for the Herold society's library.

Two expert opinions drawn up at The Hague in 1857 and 1859 accompanied the manuscript. The first dated the paper from its three watermarks, a P, a fleur-de-lis and a bull's head, which were attested only between 1380 and 1399. The second, by M. F. A. G. Campbell of the Royal Library at The Hague, observed that plate 27 gives the arms of Van Hornes as those of the bishop of Liège, and narrowed the date to the episcopate of Arnold van Hoorn, which Campbell placed in 1379–1389.

The Herold society had the manuscript reproduced by hand by the heraldic artist Adolf Matthias Hildebrandt and published it in 1893 with a preface and notes by Seyler.

== See also ==
- Gelre Armorial
- Zürich armorial
