= Holstein Castle =

Former water castle near Nümbrecht, Germany

- Nümbrecht, North Rhine-Westphalia, Germany
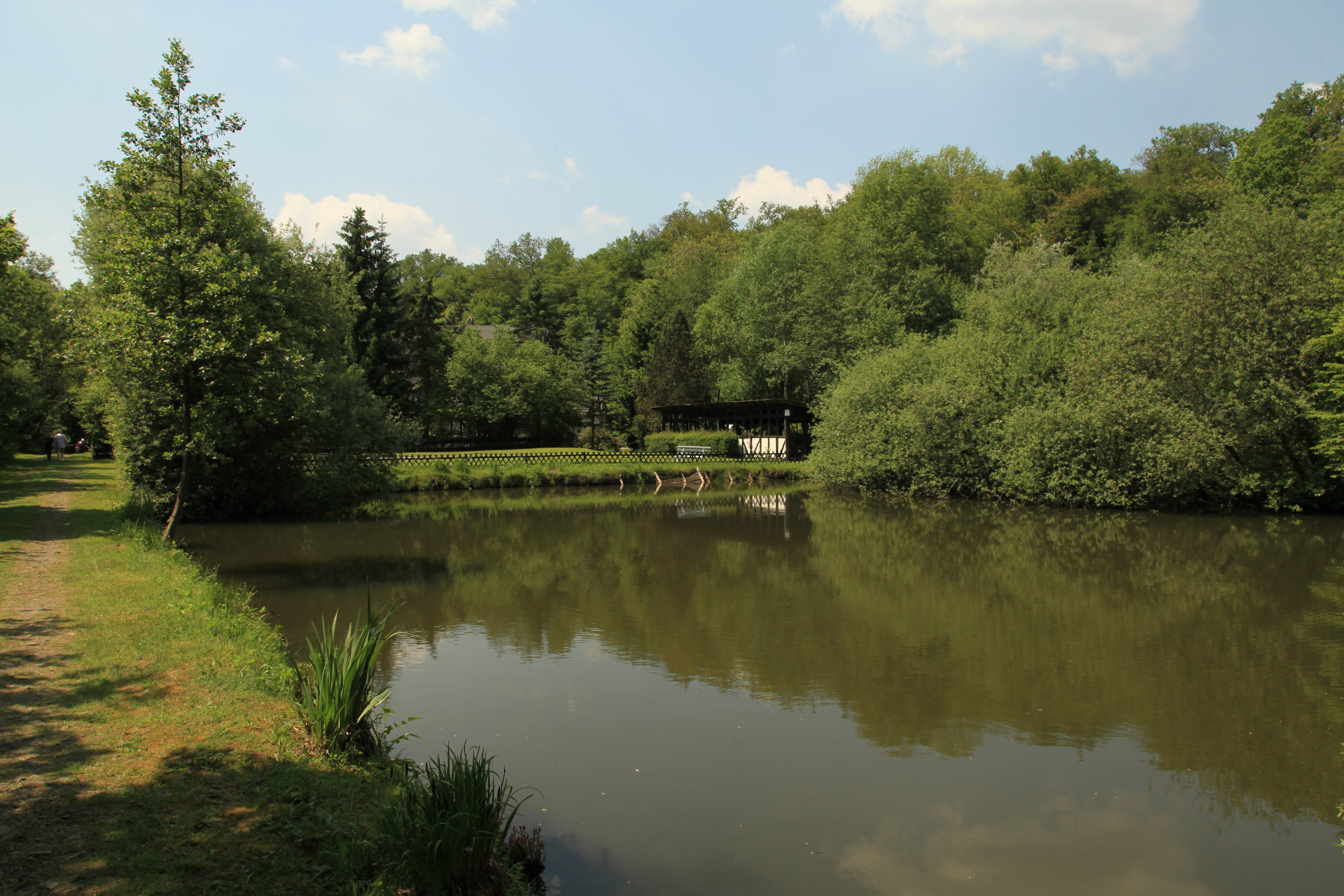
- The castle moat, now the mill pond of Holsteins Mühle

Site information
- Type: Moated water castle
- Condition: Protected ruin

Location
- Location within North Rhine-Westphalia
- Coordinates: 50.9206°N 7.5416°E

Site history
- Built: c. 900

Holstein Castle (German: Burg Holstein) was a moated water castle on the river Bröl near Nümbrecht, in the Oberbergischer Kreis of North Rhine-Westphalia, Germany. It was the ancestral seat of the Staël von Holstein family, who held it in fief from the Counts of Sponheim. The castle is believed to have been destroyed amid the recurring regional feuds of the late 13th century, although the date and circumstances are unknown. Its site survives as a protected archaeological monument, adjacent to the historic mill Holsteins Mühle.

== History ==
The Staël von Holstein family, originally surnamed Flecke de Are, is attested as early as 1189, when Ludewicus Flecke de Are is recorded as Vogt of Brodenheim, an estate of St. Pantaleon's Abbey, in a charter of Philip I, archbishop of Cologne. Ludewicus's son, Henricus Flecke de Are (also styled as Henricus Flecke de Holstein), is attested from 1237.

On 11 June 1256, Henricus' widow Heilewigis transferred the castle to their daughter Benedicta and her husband Theodericus de Schinne. On 16 July 1270 the brothers Henricus and Theodericus Flecke de Holstein renounced their claim to the castle in favour of Count Godefridus I de Sayn. Although the castle was lost to the family, its members continued to bear the toponymic surname.

== Site ==
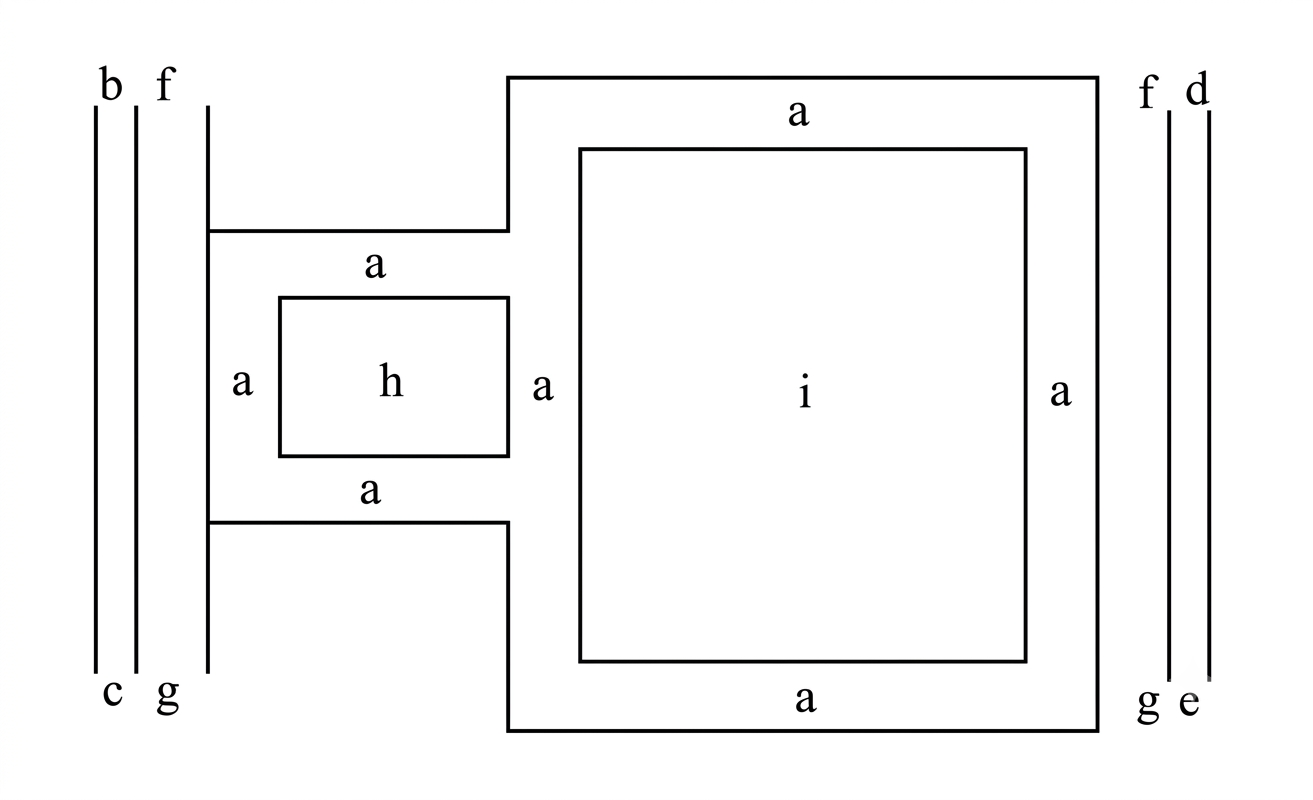
Fahne's survey of the castle plan (1871)

The castle stood in the valley of the Bröl, a location corroborated by a 1279 grant of the abbot of Siegburg Abbey. The site was surveyed in the 19th century by the historian and genealogist Anton Fahne, who recorded the ruins of a massive fortification set on two islands: a smaller island approximately 30 paces by 30 paces entirely covered with stonemasonry, and alongside it a second, larger island, approximately 90 paces by 90 paces, reduced to a meadow. Both islands were enclosed by moats fed by the Bröl. Excavation uncovered the foundations of the water castle beneath Holsteins Mühle, which was later built over them; an ancient well survives inside the mill building. The site is entered as Bodendenkmal No. 40 in the heritage register of the municipality of Nümbrecht (listed 30 September 1983).

The hilltop Homburg Castle of the Counts of Sayn, first documented in 1276, was the successor of the earlier valley water castle. The historian Albrecht Brendler, citing historical confusion with the nearby Homburg Castle, has stated that it is possible the two names denote a single site.

== See also ==
- Staël von Holstein
- Homburg Castle
