= Eulenbroich Castle =

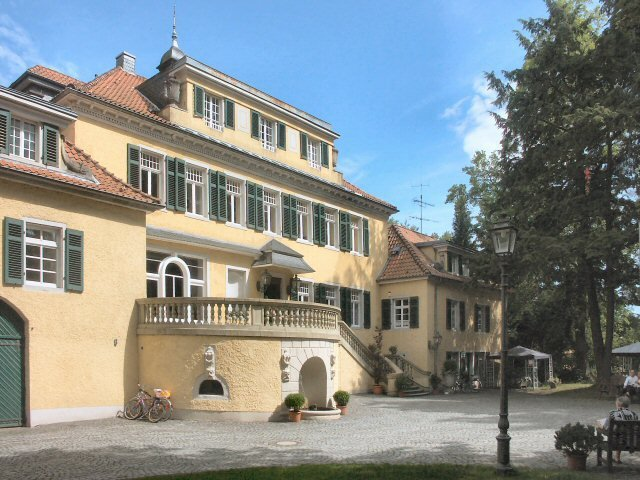
- The manor house
- Interactive map of Eulenbroich Castle
- 50°53′58.82″N 7°11′8.68″E
- Location: Rösrath, Germany

History
- Built: 13th century

Eulenbroich Castle (German: Schloss Eulenbroich) is a former moated castle in Rösrath, near Cologne in North Rhine-Westphalia, Germany, on the Sülz river.

== History ==
Excavations uncovered remains of an earlier castle on the site, dating to the 13th century; nothing is known of its occupants. The Staël von Holstein family held the castle from 1401 until 1762.

In 1762 Johann Werner Freiherr von Francken bought the estate and reconfigured the manor house in Baroque style. The Cologne manufacturer Robert Rohr acquired it next; as mayor of Rösrath, he made the manor house his official residence from 1851 to 1878. In 1908 the industrialist Emil Biedermann commissioned the Cologne architect Hermann Eberhard Pflaume to remodel the compound as a bourgeois villa, adding a winter garden to the east front.

After the Second World War the complex housed a boarding school for Belgian girls. It then stood empty from 1955 until a private old-people's home opened there in 1969. The municipality of Rösrath took over the estate in 1981 and opened it to the public in 1984.

== Gatehouse ==
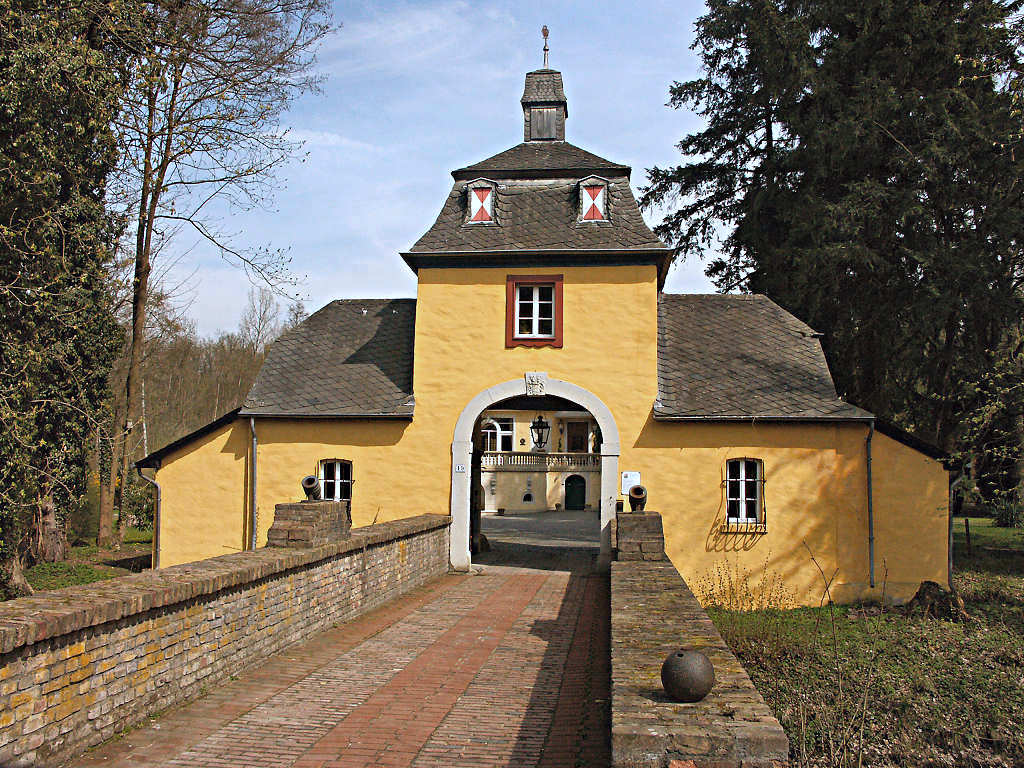
Eulenbroich Castle gatehouse

The former bailey, today the gatehouse, dates from the 18th-century. The wooden gate bears the arms of the builder, Johann Werner Freiherr von Francken. The gatehouse is the emblem of Rösrath, used as the town's logo on its letterheads and website.

== Present use ==
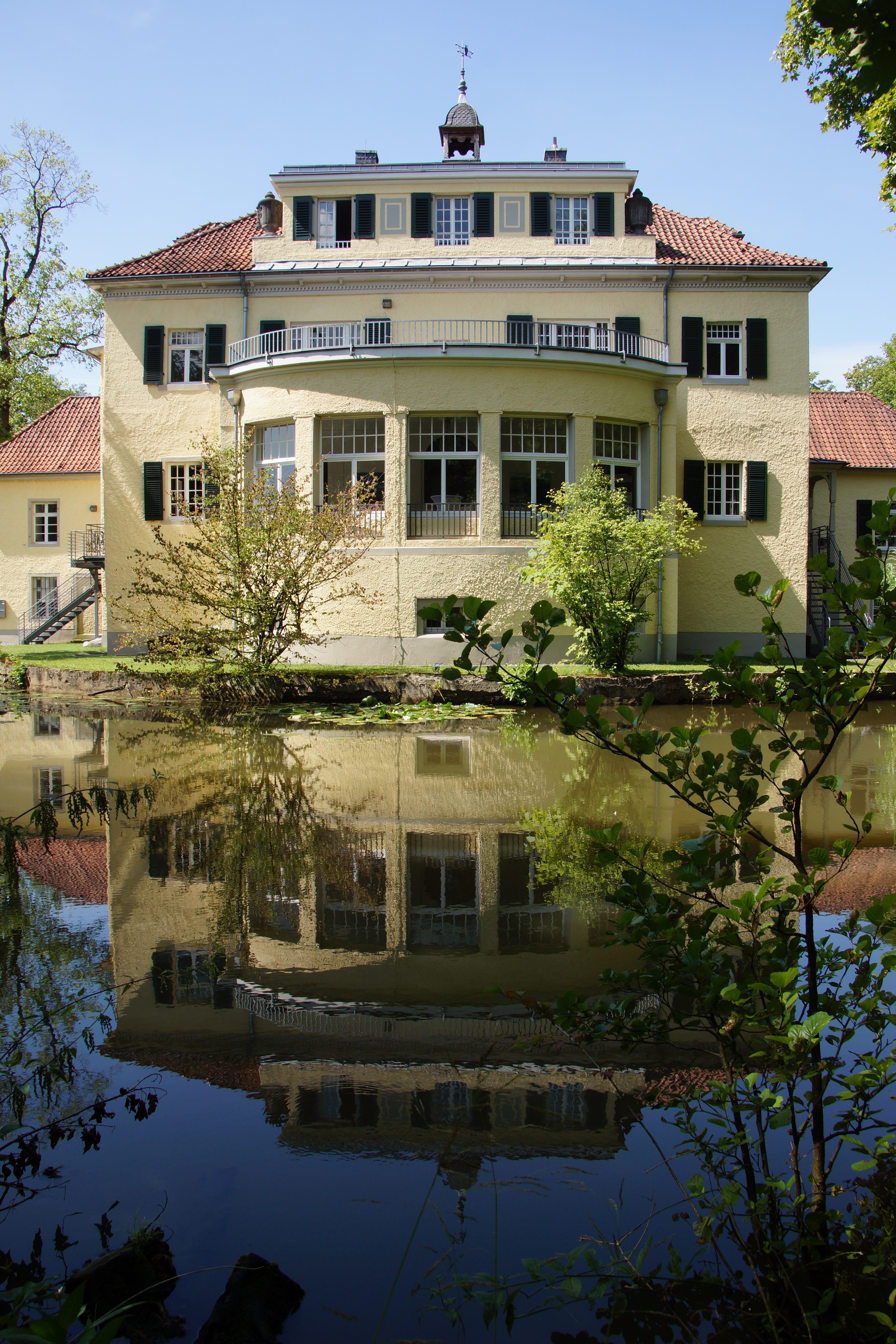
Rear view with moat

The castle today is a civic cultural center hosting weddings, art exhibitions, theater and literary events as well as the Rösrath-Overath music school. The gatehouse houses the Rösrath historical society.

== See also ==
- Staël von Holstein
- Staël von Holstein family residences

== Literature ==
- Hans Haas (ed.): Von der Burg zum Bürgerhaus. Festschrift der Gemeinde Rösrath und des Geschichtsvereins zur Einweihung von Haus Eulenbroich am 9. Mai 1984. (Schriftenreihe des Geschichtsvereins für die Gemeinde Rösrath und Umgebung, vol. 11.) Rösrath 1984.
