= Armorial Bellenville =

Late 14th-century armorial manuscript in the Bibliothèque nationale de France

- Bibliothèque nationale de France, Paris
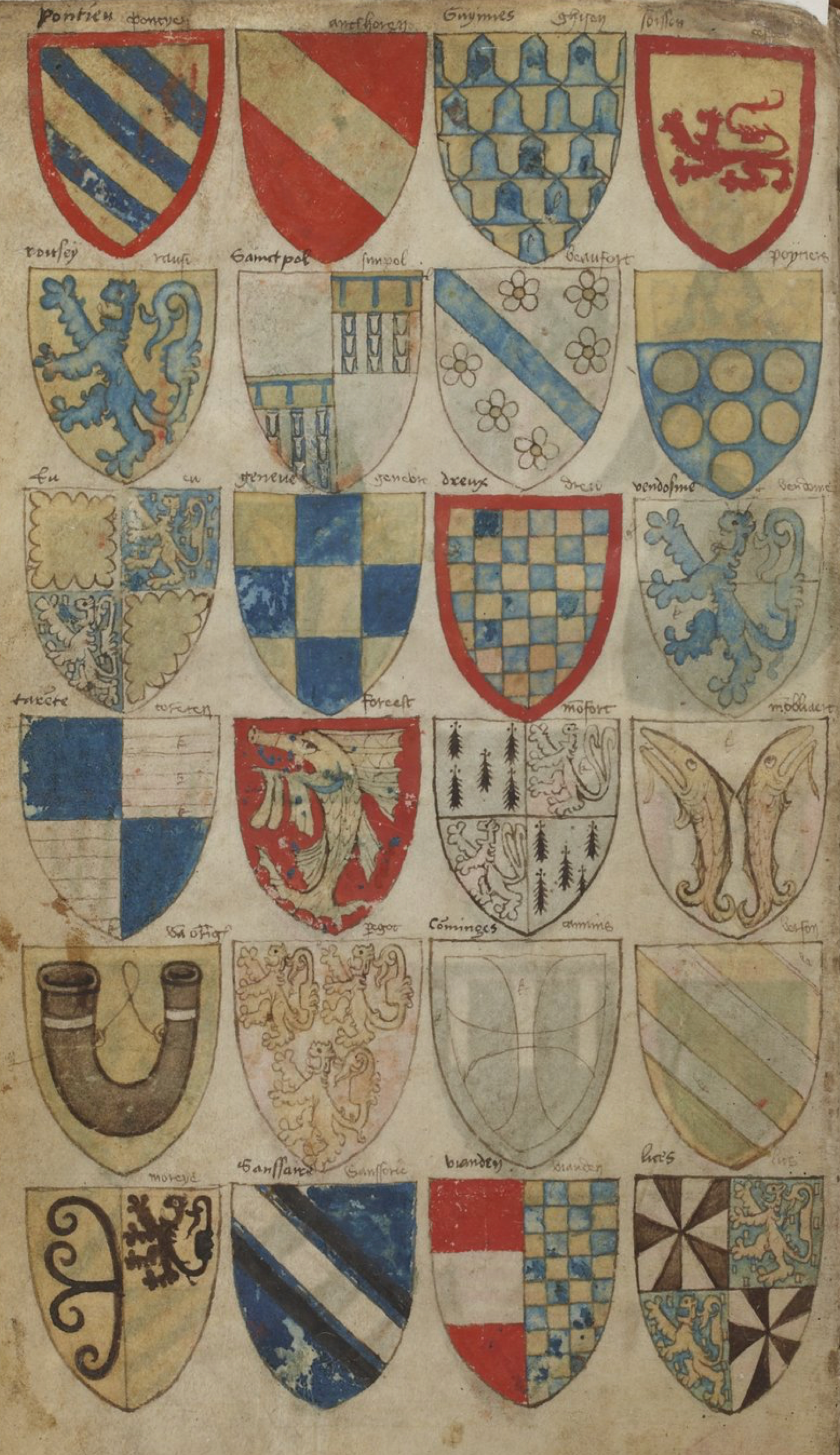
- folio 1v
- Date: c. 1355–1400
- Place of origin: northern Low Countries or the Lower Rhine
- Language: mostly Middle Dutch
- Size: 75 folios, 70 used
- Illumination: more than 1,700 painted coats of arms
- Accession: Français 5230 (formerly 9815)

The Armorial Bellenville, also known as the Bellenville Armorial or the Armorial Beaulaincourt, is a painted armorial made in the Low Countries in the second half of the 14th century, now in the Bibliothèque nationale de France as ms. Français 5230. With more than 1,700 coats of arms it is among the largest surviving medieval armorials and, with the Gelre Armorial and the Zürich armorial, a principal source for the heraldry of late medieval northern Europe.

== Description and contents ==
The manuscript is painted on parchment and has 75 leaves, foliated A and 1 to 74, five of them blank; some pages were never finished. The shields are set on a ruled grid, the principal arms of each group drawn larger and surmounted by a helmet and crest.

It falls into two parts. The first, on folios 1r–54v, gives the arms of kings, dukes, counts and lesser nobles in 44 segments answering to the marches d'armes, the regional jurisdictions used by heralds, among them Brabant, Brittany, Flanders, Guelders, Jülich and Denmark. The second, on folios 55r–72v, records eleven groups of men present at tournaments and at the Preußenfahrten, the expeditions of western nobles who campaigned with the Teutonic Order in the eastern Baltic. Despite their differences the two parts were not separate books bound together later.

== Origin and authorship ==
Léon Jéquier dated the individual segments to about 1355–1380, while Michel Pastoureau and Michel Popoff put the painting between 1375 and 1385, continuing to about 1400. Most of the legends are in Dutch and roughly 60 per cent of the arms are Netherlandish or Rhenish, so the manuscript is now placed in the northern Netherlands or the Lower Rhine rather than in Flanders, as the BnF catalogue suggests.

Neither compiler nor patron is named. Two painted figures of heralds appear, on folios 63r and 70r, the first wearing the arms of Guelders, and this has prompted repeated attempts to link the armorial to Claes Heinenzoon, the Gelre Herald and author of the Gelre Armorial; Jéquier's comparison of the two works argued against a common compiler, and no direct evidence identifies the maker.

== Provenance ==
Folio A verso bears the note Au sieur de Bellenville, roi d'armes en Artois, the source of the manuscript's name. This was Antoine de Beaulaincourt (died 1559), Toison d'or King of Arms to the Order of the Golden Fleece. The book later belonged to the Parisian collector Alexandre Petau (1610–1672) and passed with other Petau manuscripts into the French royal library.

== Editions ==
Jéquier published a study and partial edition in 1983, and Pastoureau and Popoff a facsimile with a volume of commentary in 2004. The manuscript is digitized in full on Gallica.

== Gallery ==
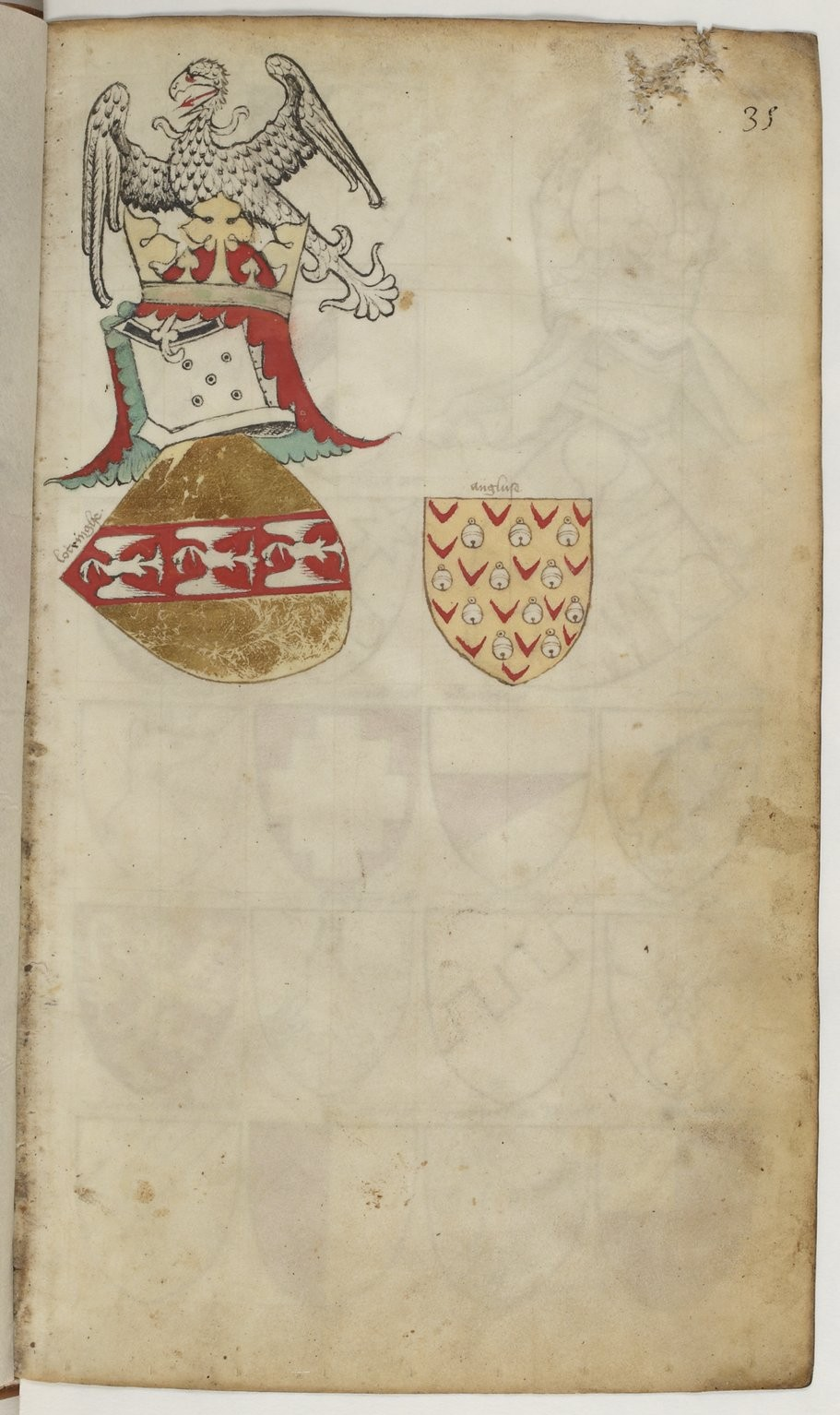
Folio 35r

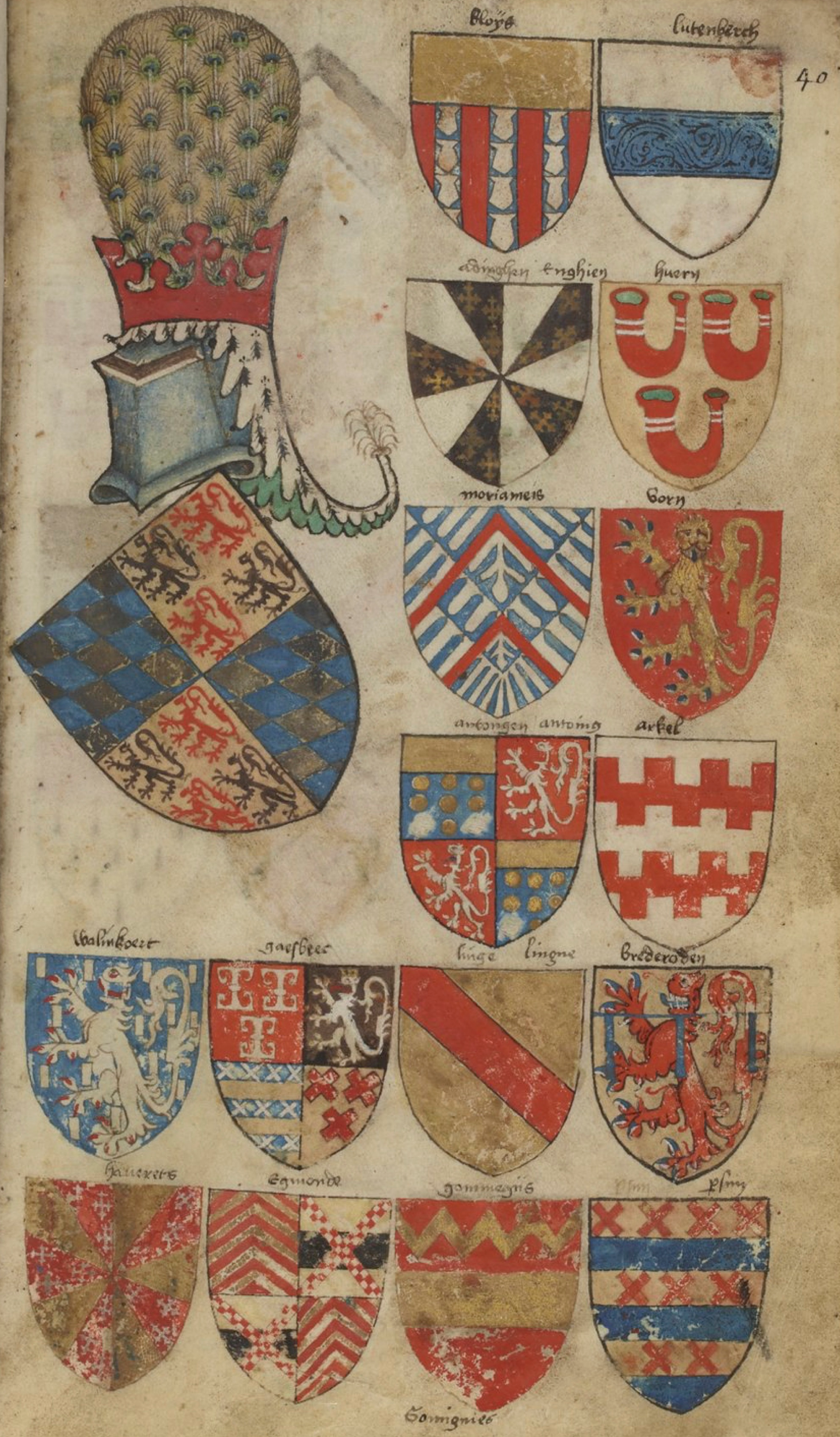
Folio 40

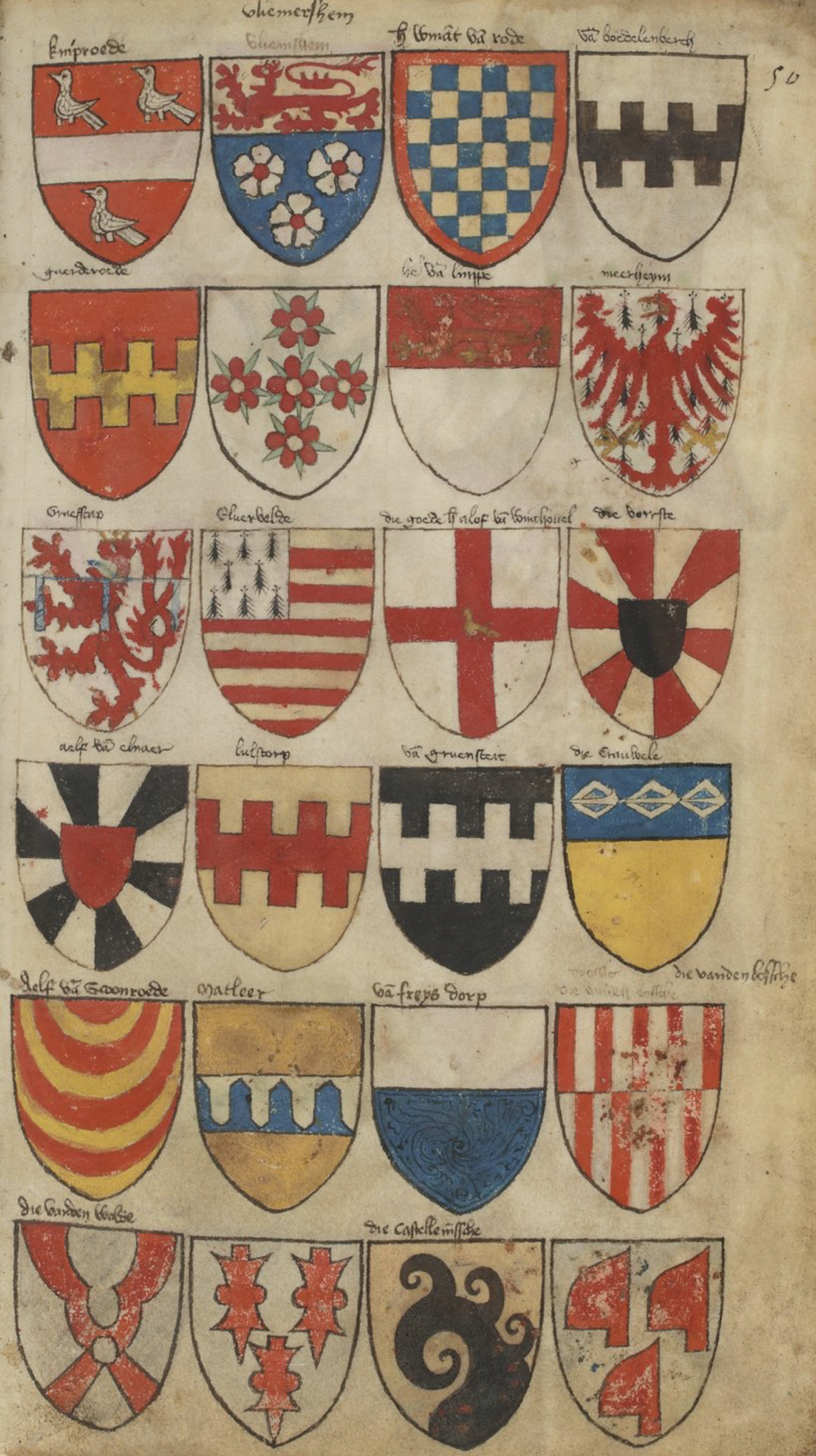
Folio 50

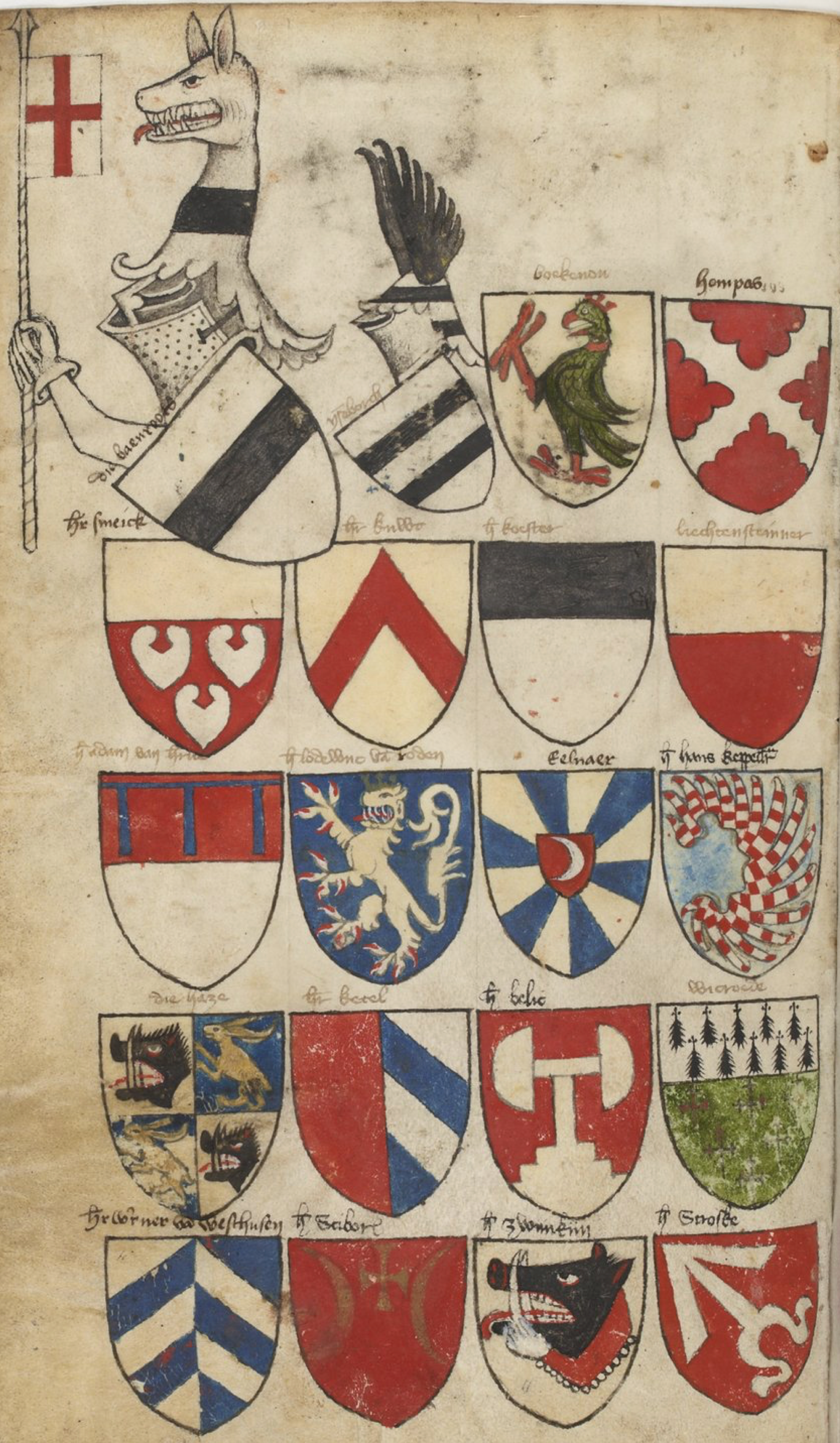
Folio 60v

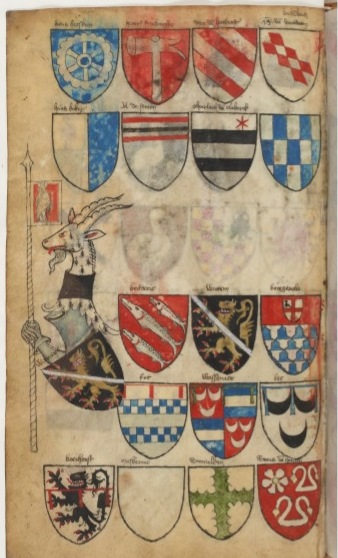
Folio 61r

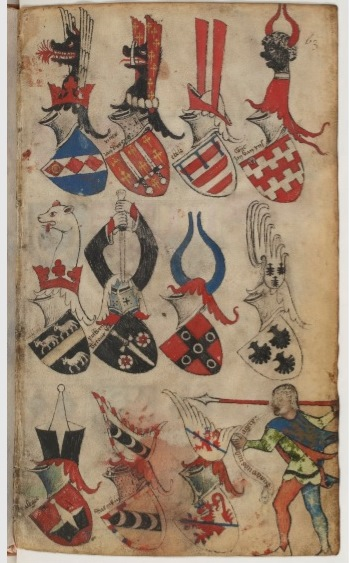
Folio 63

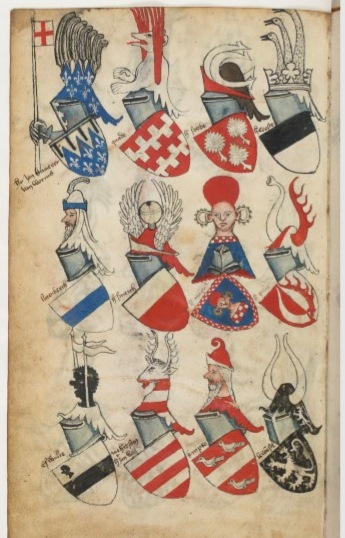
Folio 66r

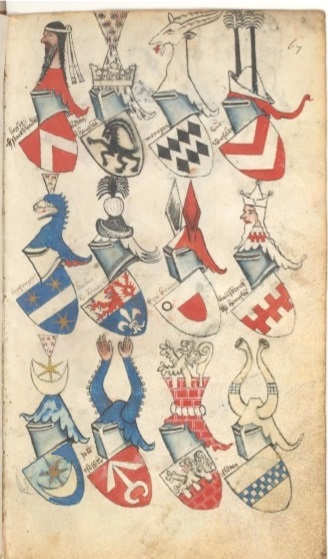
Folio 67

== See also ==
- Roll of arms
- Gelre Armorial
- Zürich armorial
