= Codex Bergshammar =

15th-century armorial manuscript in the National Archives of Sweden

- Stockholm, Riksarkivet
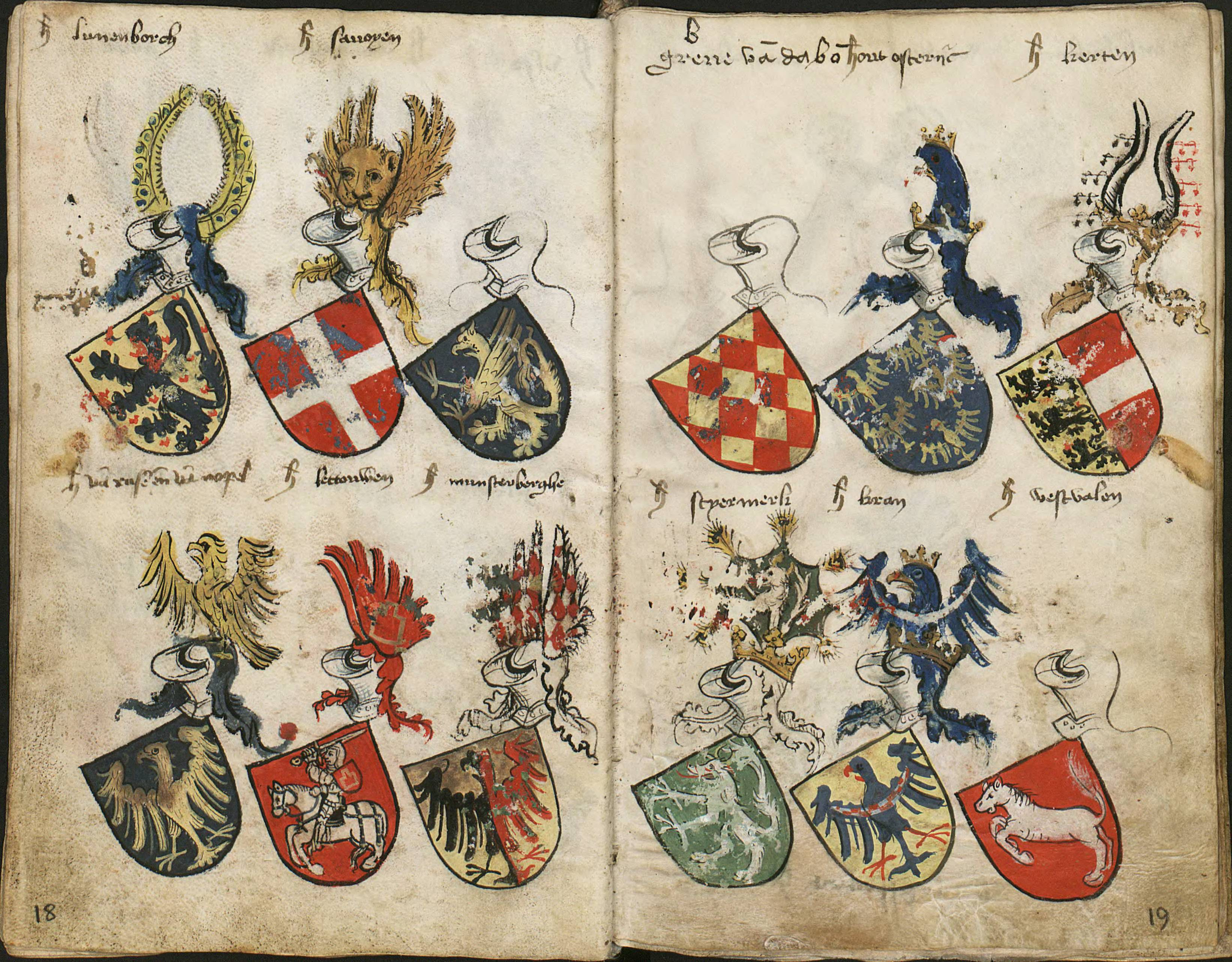
- Date: mid-15th century
- Material: parchment
- Size: 243 folios, 235 used
- Illumination: c. 3,400 painted coats of arms

The Codex Bergshammar (Swedish: Bergshammarvapenboken), also called the Bergshammar armorial, is a mid-fifteenth century armorial manuscript. With some 3,400 painted coats of arms it is among the largest surviving medieval rolls of arms. It is thought to have been made in the Southern Netherlands; nothing is known of its maker or of the purpose for which it was compiled.

== Description ==
The armorial is held in the National Archives of Sweden in Stockholm, shelfmark SE/RA/720085/Z. The manuscript is on parchment and measures 220 × 140 × 70 mm. It has 243 folios, of which 235 are used, in 23 quires, and retains its original binding. Steen Clemmensen counts 3,388 items.

Execution is uneven across the book. Some pages carry only the outlines of helmets and shields, others crests without shields, and elsewhere neither helmets nor crests appear. The drawings vary in size between sections, and captions are sometimes absent, sometimes written horizontally above the arms and sometimes vertically.

== Contents ==
The armorial opens with the arms of European sovereigns and high nobility arranged by rank, and then continues by political entity, each section headed by a ruler and followed by his vassals. The emphasis falls on the Holy Roman Empire, France and England. Most items are identified by family name, personal name or territory.

At the head of a number of sections is a display in which the ruler's arms are set in the centre, surrounded by those of four ancestors: his parents and two grandmothers. Comparable displays occur in the Lyncenich armorial.

== Sources and date ==
Jan Raneke, whose 1975 Lund dissertation remains the fullest study of the manuscript, showed that more than half of its contents could derive from two earlier armorials, the Gelre and the Toison d'or, with a smaller debt to a third, the Lyncenich. Clemmensen, who has traced the sources of more than 85 per cent of the book, agrees that it was compiled by a herald but rejects Raneke's view that the compiler added to it over many years, proposing instead that it was desk work painted over a relatively short period from exemplars available to him. Clemmensen's datings for individual sections extend to 1456.

== Digitisation ==
A digital facsimile was made freely available on the website of the National Archives of Sweden in 2018. Clemmensen has separately published blazons of the arms in English with an ordinary and an index of names.

== See also ==
- Roll of arms
- Gelre Armorial
- Armorial Wijnbergen
