= Wasserburg =

Wasserburg may refer to:

- Water castle, a castle surrounded by a body of water

== Places ==
- Krausnick-Groß Wasserburg, a municipality in Brandenburg, Germany
- Wasserburg am Inn, a town in Upper Bavaria, Germany
  - TSV 1880 Wasserburg, a multi-sport club
  - Wasserburg am Inn (district), a former district
- Wasserburg am Bodensee, a municipality in Bavaria, Germany
- Wasserburg, a late Bronze Age settlement near Bad Buchau, Germany
- Führer Headquarters Wasserburg, a Nazi German military headquarters near Pskov in the Soviet Union
- Wasserbourg (German: Wasserburg), a commune in Grand Est, France

== Other uses ==
- Gerald J. Wasserburg (1927–2016), American geologist
- Philipp Wasserburg (1827-1897), German writer and member of the parliament
- 4765 Wasserburg, an asteroid
