= Anton Fahne =

German author, jurist, genealogist and historian

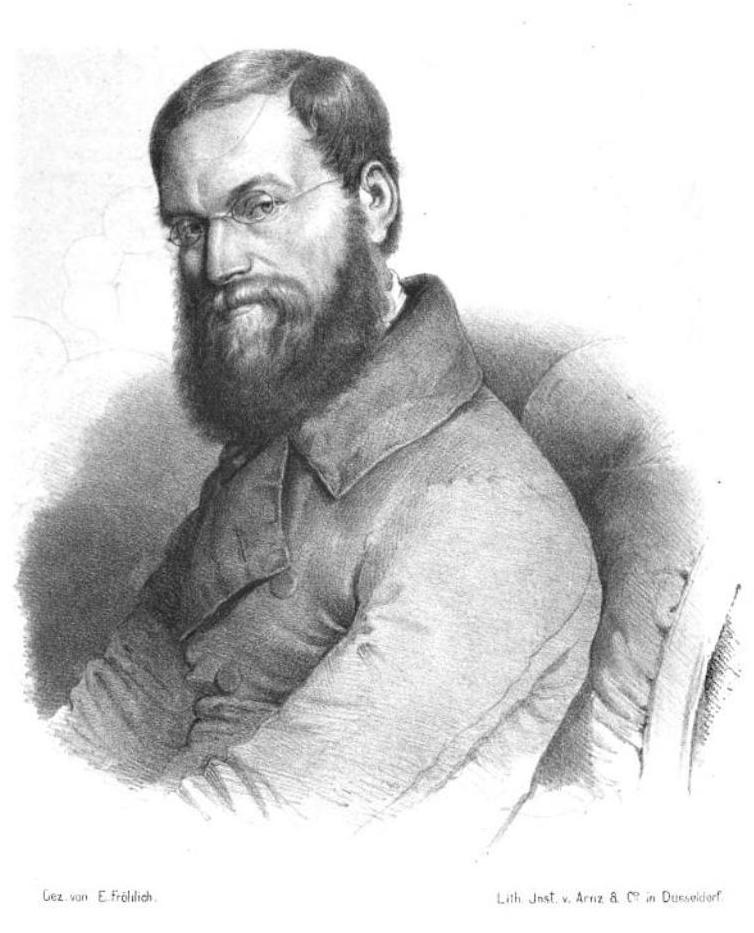
- Born: 28 February 1805; Münster
- Died: 12 January 1883
- Education: University of Bonn, Humboldt University of Berlin
- Occupations: Author; historian; writer; Genealogist; jurist
- Spouse: Julie Stommel

Anton F. Fahne (28 February 1805 – 12 January 1883) was a German author, jurist, genealogist and historian.

Fahne was born in Münster and studied medicine at the University of Bonn and law at the Humboldt University of Berlin. He produced several genealogical and local historical writings. Fahne helped to found the Historischen Verein für den Niederrhein (Historical Society of the Lower Rhine) in 1854.

Fahne died in Düsseldorf. He was buried at the Gerresheimer Waldfriedhof in Düsseldorf-Gerresheim. His estate manages the Historical Archive of the City of Cologne.

It is a common mistake that Anton Fahne and the poet Friedrich von Uechtritz are the same person.
