= Wapnö Castle =

Castle in Halland, Sweden

Coordinates: 56°42′47″N 12°50′28″E

- Sweden
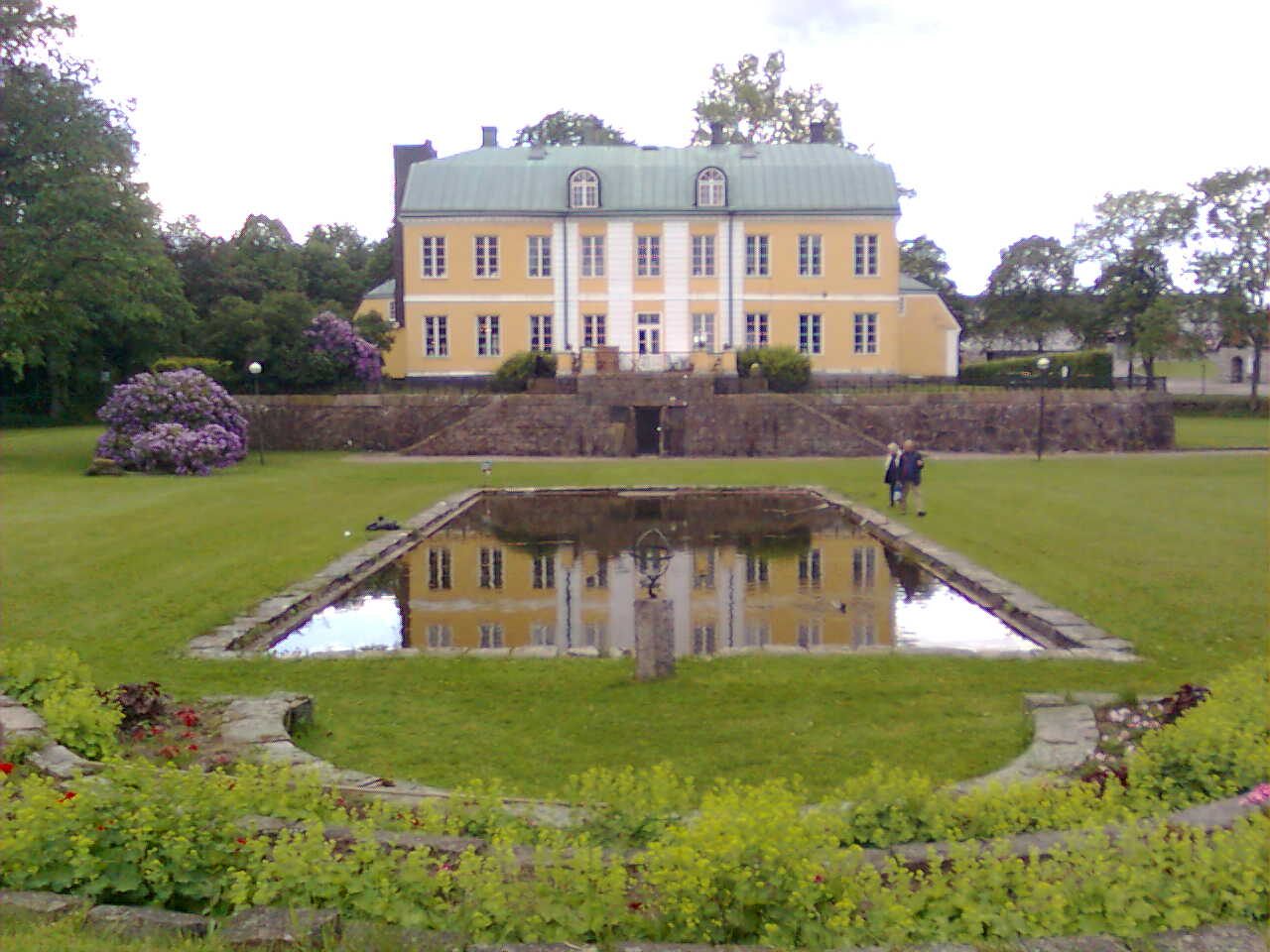
- Vapnö slott

Wapnö Castle (Vapnö slott) is located in Vapnö parish in Halmstad Municipality, Halland, Sweden. The main building houses a restaurant and conference center. The estate comprises 1400 hectares of productive agricultural land and 433 hectares of forest land. The main activity of the estate is milk production and operation of a dairy.

== See also ==
- List of castles in Sweden
