= Behörighetslagen =

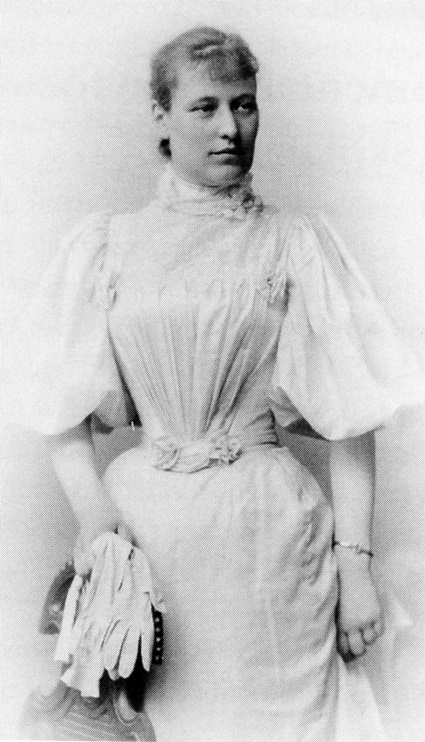
Anna Ahlström ca. 1890

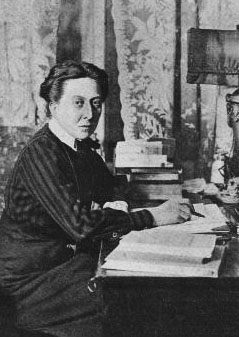
Mathilda Stael von Holstein

Behörighetslagen (lit. 'Competence Law') was an historical law in Sweden, which formally guaranteed men and women equal right to all public professions and positions in society, with certain specified exceptions. The law was passed in 1923, and enforced in 1925. It was dropped in 1945, because it contained exceptions which started to be seen as a problem by that point. The exceptions consisted of the right to become priests of the state church (which was allowed in 1958) and to hold military office (which was allowed in a series of reforms in 1980–1989).

== Background ==
The background to the law was the raising employment rate of women in the educated professions, both in public and private, which took place during the later half of the 19th-century, particularly after women gained access to university education in the 1870s. Because women were suddenly employed in professions where their presence had previously been unknown, such as those of civil servant (5,000 by 1870 and 15,000 by 1890), clerks, telegraph-, post- and bank officials, secretaries and assistants, numerous problems aroused. These professions had previously been de facto reserved for men, and women's employment in them often resulted in discrimination.

The most common problem was that Paragraph 28 of the constitution demanded that application forms for positions within government institutions were phrased with the word "Swedish man", which made it impossible for women to apply for them. This was illustrated by the fact that women physicians could not be employed in public state hospitals, only in private hospitals; nor could women teachers be employed above the level of subject teacher in a public state school, because such position, if in state institutions, were defined as government service, and all supplicants to government service professions were by Paragraph 28 defined as a "Swedish man".

== Campaign ==
While the Swedish Parliament did address these issues, they did so by removing the qualification restriction of Paragraph 28 from one profession at a time, which was a very slow method. The problem was illustrated by the teaching profession. When the state introduced a regulated elementary school system in 1842, women teachers were employed by dispensation until the profession of public elementary school teacher was open to them in 1853, and fifty years later, they were still not allowed to teach above the level of subject teacher in state schools.

The profession of teacher was the most common profession for an educated woman, and in 1903, it was the women teachers under the leadership of Anna Ahlström who petitioned the government with a demand for equal employment opportunities for male and female teachers. When the petition proved unsuccessful, Anna Ahlström formed the Akademiskt Bildade Kvinnors Förening or ABKF ('Society of Women Academics') to address the issue.

Frustrated by the traditional method of removing the gendered qualification from one office at a time, they demanded the general removal of Paragraph 28 from all government and civil servant professions, which would automatically open all professions for women in any state institution and any profession defined by law as government service once and for all.

In 1909, the ABKF succeeded in their campaign and the gendered qualification of Paragraph 28 was finally removed from all application forms to state professions and government service. The removal of Paragraph 28 formally allowed women access to all professions simply because it no longer banned them from it, but because the reform did not explicitly say so, there were still room for de facto discrimination of women from higher offices. The ABKF could therefore not consider the removal of Paragraph 28 as a full success of their goal.

== Committee of 1919 ==
In 1919, a committee was formed by the Justice Department to address the issue. At this point in time, there was an urgent need from the point of view of the government to reform the status of women. Women suffrage was passed in 1919, which necessitated numerous reforms before they could use this right in the coming Election of 1921. Among other things, married women would have to be freed from their husbands' guardianship before they would be able to vote. The 1919 committee was therefore to perform a major reform in women's rights and status. The 1919 committee was headed by Emilia Broomé, which was the first time a government committee was headed by a woman, and included Mathilda Staël von Holstein among its members.

== Behörighetslagen ==
The work of the committee resulted in a new marriage law and legal majority of married women as well as the Behörighetslagen. The Behörighetslagen was passed in 1923 and enforced in 1925. The law explicitly gave women access to all professions and positions in society, with two exceptions: women would still not be allowed to become priests in the state church, nor would they be allowed to hold military office (this included the police force, as the main objective was to exclude women from professions in which they could legally use the monopoly on violence). The reform had visible effect: between 1910 and 1930, the number of women civil servants grew from 30,000 to 60,000 in the public sector, and from 10,000 to 40,000 in the private sector.

Behörighetslagen was in effect until 1945. At that point, however, the exceptions within it caused it to be viewed as a problem. Women were allowed in the Police force on equal terms with men between 1944 and 1954, women were allowed to become priests in the state church in 1958, and all the military offices were opened to women in a series of reforms between 1980 and 1989.
