= Zürich armorial =

14th century Swiss roll of arms

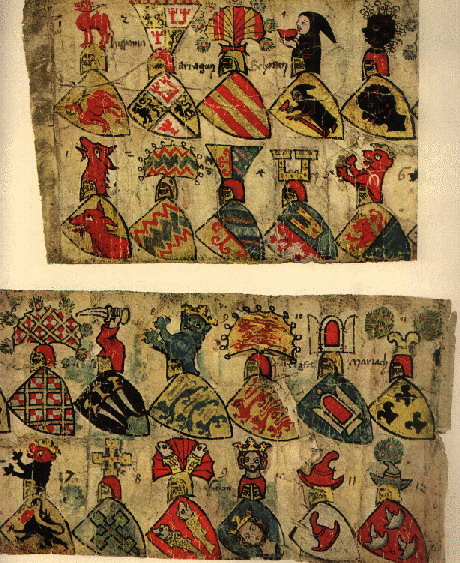

The Zürich armorial (German: Zürcher Wappenrolle) is a roll of arms made in c. 1340 presumably in what is now eastern Switzerland (in or near what is now the canton of St. Gallen); it is now kept in the Swiss National Museum in Zürich.

The document was owned by Zürich naturalist and historian Johann Jakob Scheuchzer (1672–1733). Its previous history is unknown. It was given to the Zürich city library by Scheuchzer's nephew in 1750.

The Zürich armorial is one of the oldest and most important surviving collection of arms of the lower nobility of the Holy Roman Empire. Its geographical focus is that of greater Swabia, including the Lake Constance area, German-speaking Switzerland, Elsass, and Baden.

It consisted of four parchment strips 12.5 cm wide, with a combined length of four meters. One of the four parts was lost; on the surviving three parchment strips, a total of 559 coats of arms and 28 flags of bishoprics are depicted. A further 108 coats of arms depicted on the lost portion survive in manuscript copies, including one in the library of the counts of Königsegg-Aulendorf and one made by Hans Conrad Bernhauser (1698–1761) kept in Zürich Central Library.

== See also ==
- Heraldry of the Holy Roman Empire
