= Swedish Bar Association =

- Type: Bar association
- Region served: Sweden
- Website: www.advokatsamfundet.se

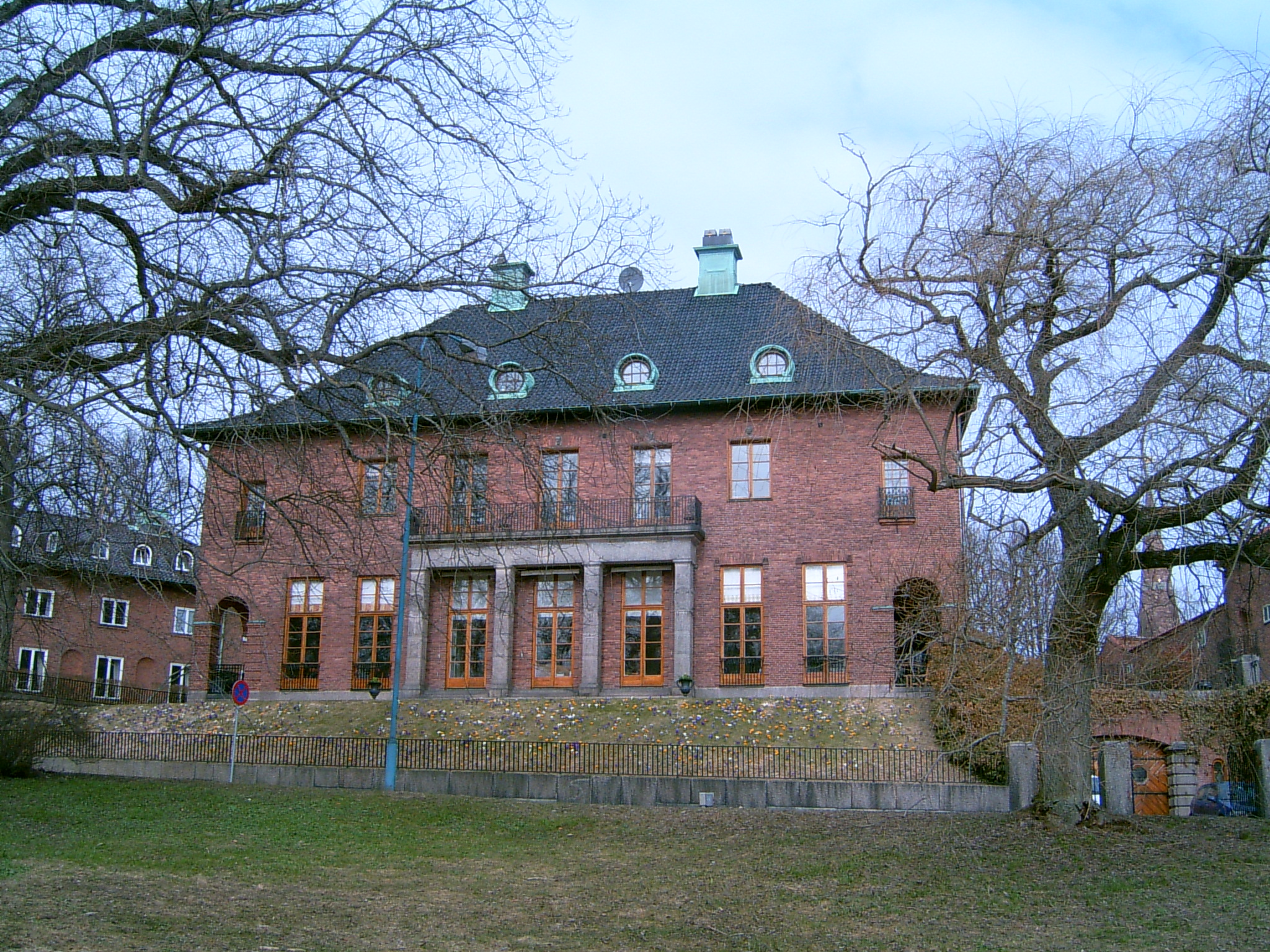
Tryggerska villa in Diplomatstaden, Stockholm was originally built as a private residence for Ernst Trygger.

The Swedish Bar Association (Swedish: Sveriges advokatsamfund) is an organisation for Swedish lawyers, including members of the Bar practicing law, under the title of advokat, a title which is protected by Swedish law and reserved for the exclusive use by the members of the Association.

Since 1981, the association is located at Tryggerska villan in Diplomatstaden, Stockholm.

== See also ==
- Advocate
- Law of Sweden
