= Gelre Armorial =

Medieval armorial

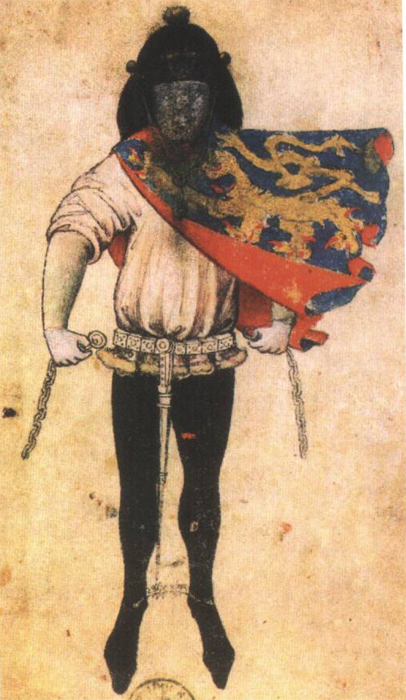
- Material: Paint on vellum
- Size: 264.5 centimetres (104.1 in) x 21 centimetres (8.3 in)
- Created: 14th century
- Present location: Royal Library of Belgium

The Gelre Armorial (Dutch: Wapenboek Gelre) is a medieval armorial.

== History ==
The armorial was compiled before 1396 by one Claes Heinenzoon (or Heynen, fl. 1345−1414) who was a herald in the service of the Duke of Guelders and also the creator of the Beyeren Armorial. The book displays some 1,800 coats-of-arms from all over Europe, in color, and is one of the most important sources for medieval heraldry.

The Gelre Armorial manuscript is nowadays preserved in the Royal Library of Belgium (signature code ms. 15652-5). A copy from around 1500, produced by Cornelis Enghebrechtsz, is preserved in the library of Hoge Raad van Adel. This version, however, only contains 1400 arms. From 1880 to 1905, Victor Bouton produced 60 copies with hand-colored arms, of which only 45 were sold.

=== Earliest known colour depiction of the Danish Flag ===
The book also contains the oldest known depiction linking the Danish king to the red flag with white cross. It also depicts the Danish Coat of arms. On folio page 55v of the armorial, behind the sinister horn is a lance tip with a banner, displaying a white cross on red. The text left of the coat of arms says die coninc van denmarke (Dutch for "the king of Denmark"). This is the earliest known coloured image of the Dannebrog (Danish flag).

== Bibliography ==
- Victor Bouton: Wapenboeck, ou Armorial de 1334 à 1372 : contenant les noms et armes des princes chrétiens ecclésiastiques et séculiers, suivis de leurs feudataires selon la constitution de l'Europe et particulièrement de l'empire d'Allemagne… / par Gelre, héraut d'armes, Paris 1897. (Digitalisat 1)(Digitalisat 2)

== Gallery ==
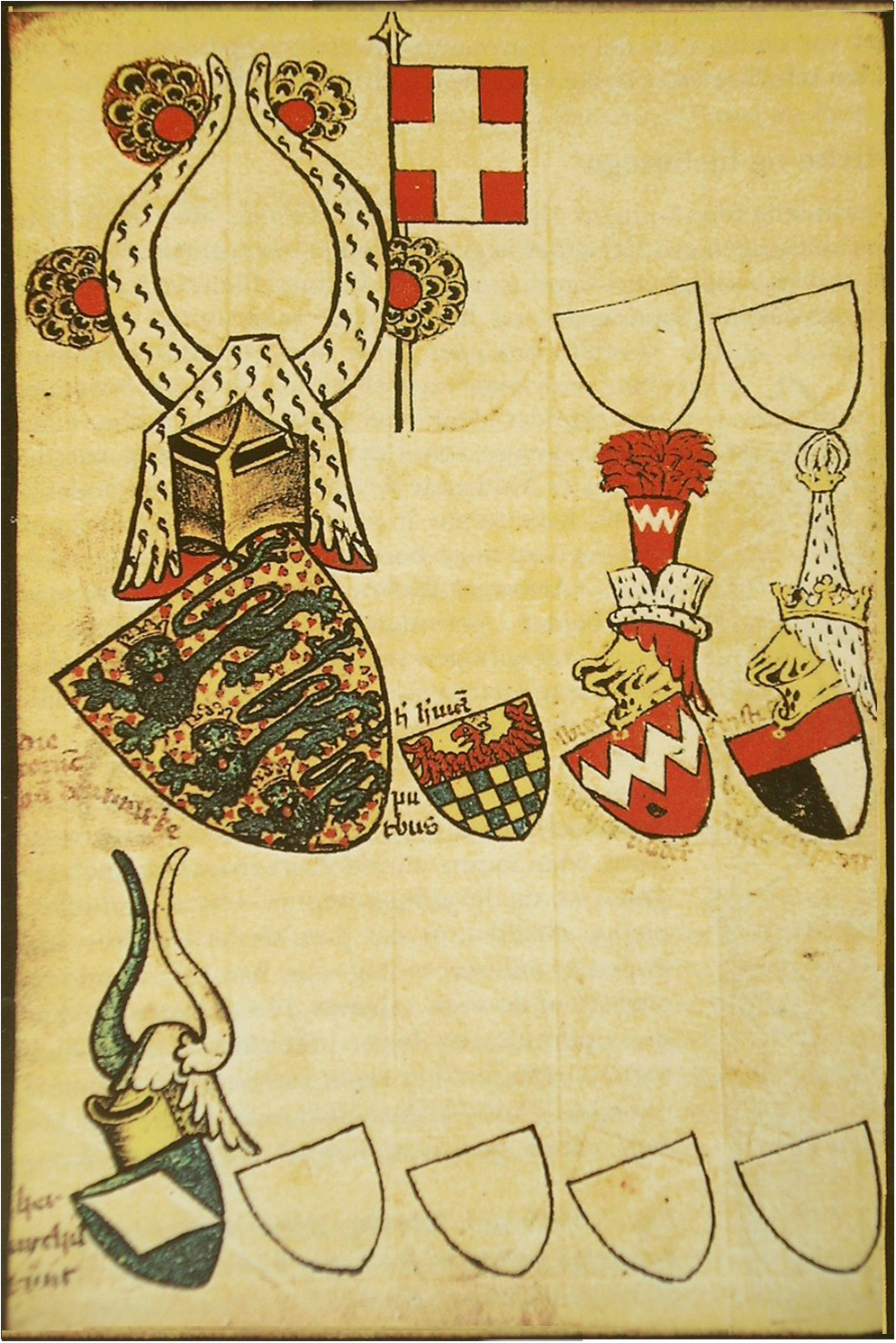
folio page 55v depicting the Dannebrog flag.

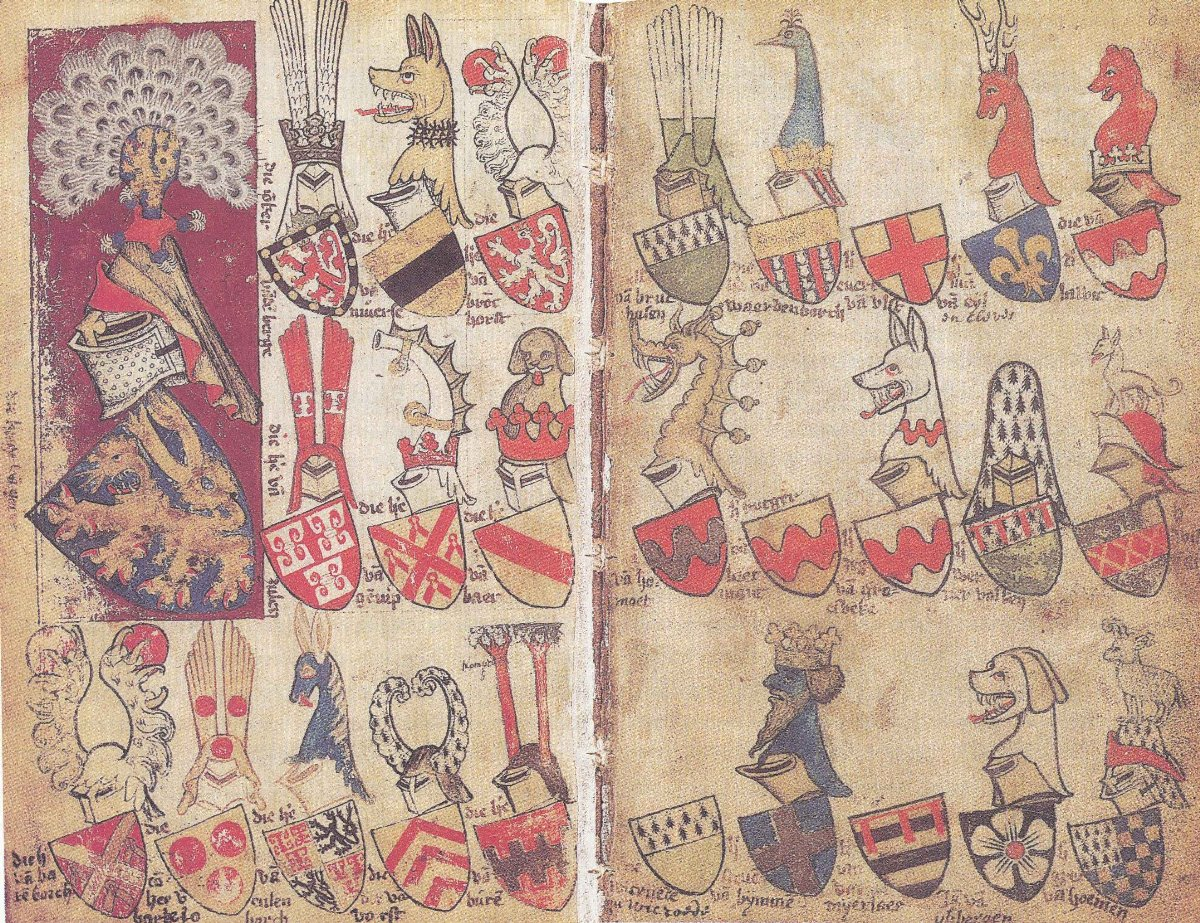
The folio pages 88v and 89r depicting the arms of noble families in the Duchy of Guelders.
