= Staël von Holstein family residences =

Landed estates of the Staël von Holstein family

Arms of the Staël von Holstein

The Staël von Holstein family residences are palaces, castles and houses which are, or were, occupied by members of the Staël von Holstein family in Europe.

Over more than eight centuries the Staël von Holstein family has held landed estates across Central, Northern, and Eastern Europe. From their medieval seat at Holstein Castle in the Bröl valley, the family accumulated dozens of castles and fortified manors across the Rhineland and Westphalia. From the late 15th century, after entering the service of the Livonian Order, members acquired estates in Livonia, Estonia, and Ingria; later branches held property in Sweden and across the Russian Empire.

Most of the holdings were lost in stages: the Ingrian and Livonian estates through the Great Northern War (1700–1721), the Rhenish and Westphalian estates with the extinction of the German branches in the 19th century, and the Baltic and Russian estates through the land reforms that followed the collapse of the Russian Empire in 1917–1921.

== Rhineland and Westphalia ==
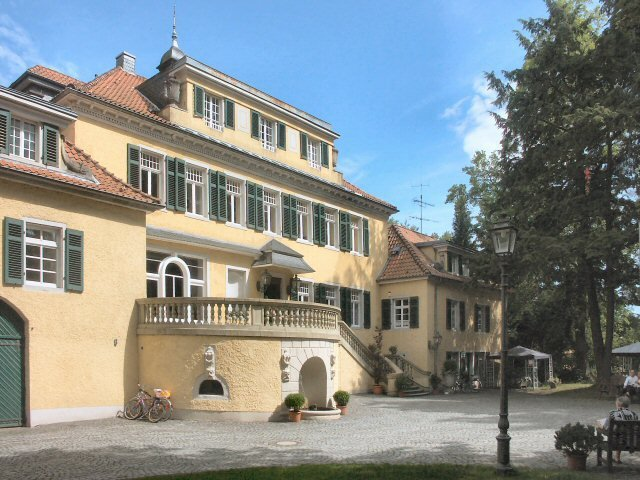
Eulenbroich Castle held c. 1388–1762

From the medieval period onward the family held numerous castles and fortified manor estates across the Rhineland and Westphalia, from the Bröl and Sülz valleys to the County of Mark and the Osnabrück region.

- Holstein Castle (Bröltal, near Nümbrecht), the ancestral seat, destroyed late 13th century; survived by Holstein Castle Mill
- Cuggenheim Castle (Kuchenheim, Euskirchen), held 13th century
- Berghausen Castle (Berghausen, near Langenfeld), held c. 1282–1433
- Schleidt Castle (Monheim am Rhein), attested 1282
- Oustorp Castle, attested 1285
- Graven and Lanquit Manors (Richrath), held c. 1281–1566
- Pesch Manor (Pesch, Cologne), attested 1342
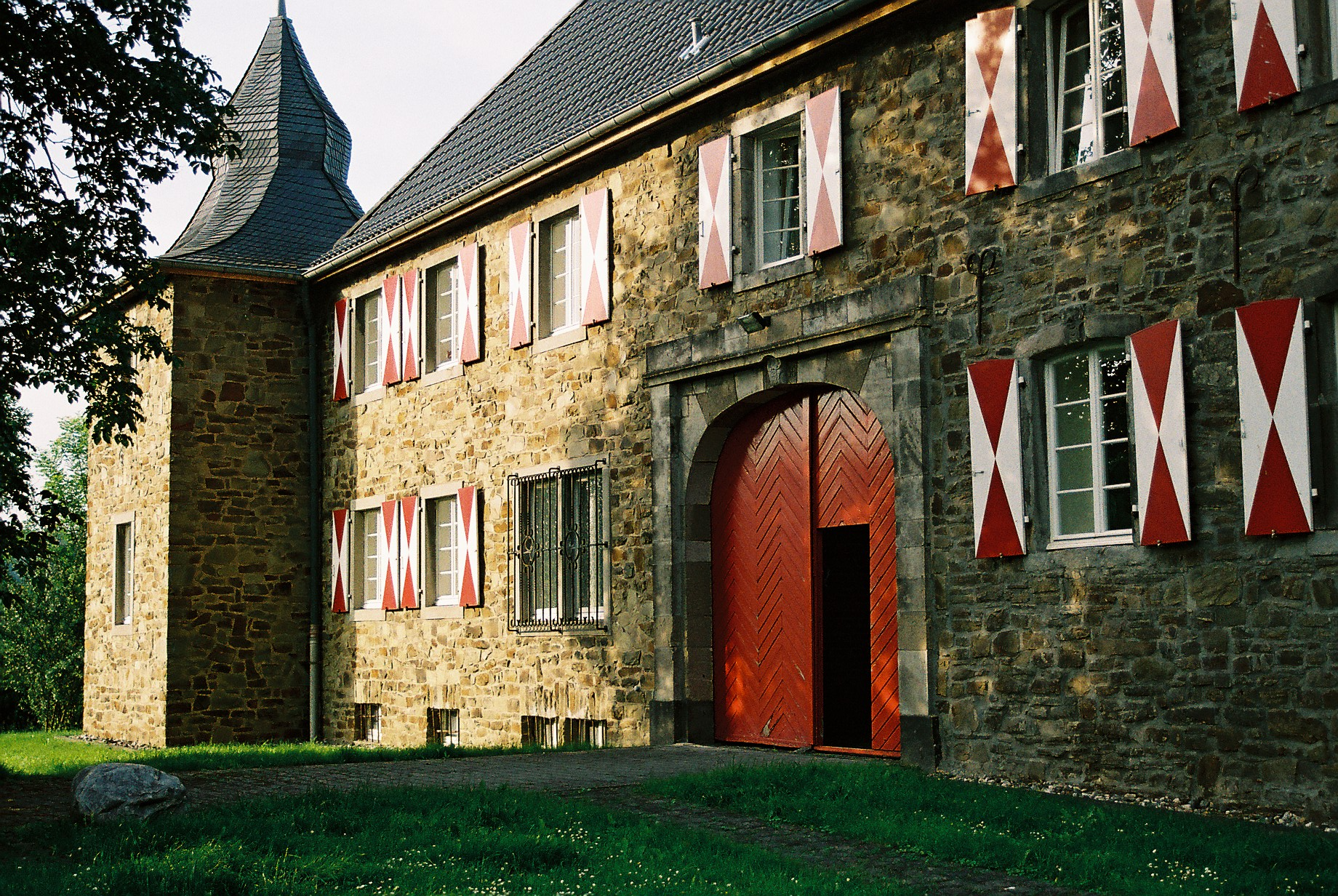
  Sülz Castle
- Mutzenrath Castle (Stommeln), held 1374–c. 1563
- Ickte Manor (Kettwig), held 1387–c. 1582
- Dahlhausen Manor (Dahlhausen), held c. 1380s–c. 1520s
- Eulenbroich Castle (Rösrath), held c. 1388–1762; now a civic cultural center
- Sülz Castle (Lohmar), held c. 1396–1547
- Honrath Castle (Lohmar), held c. 1259–c. 1363

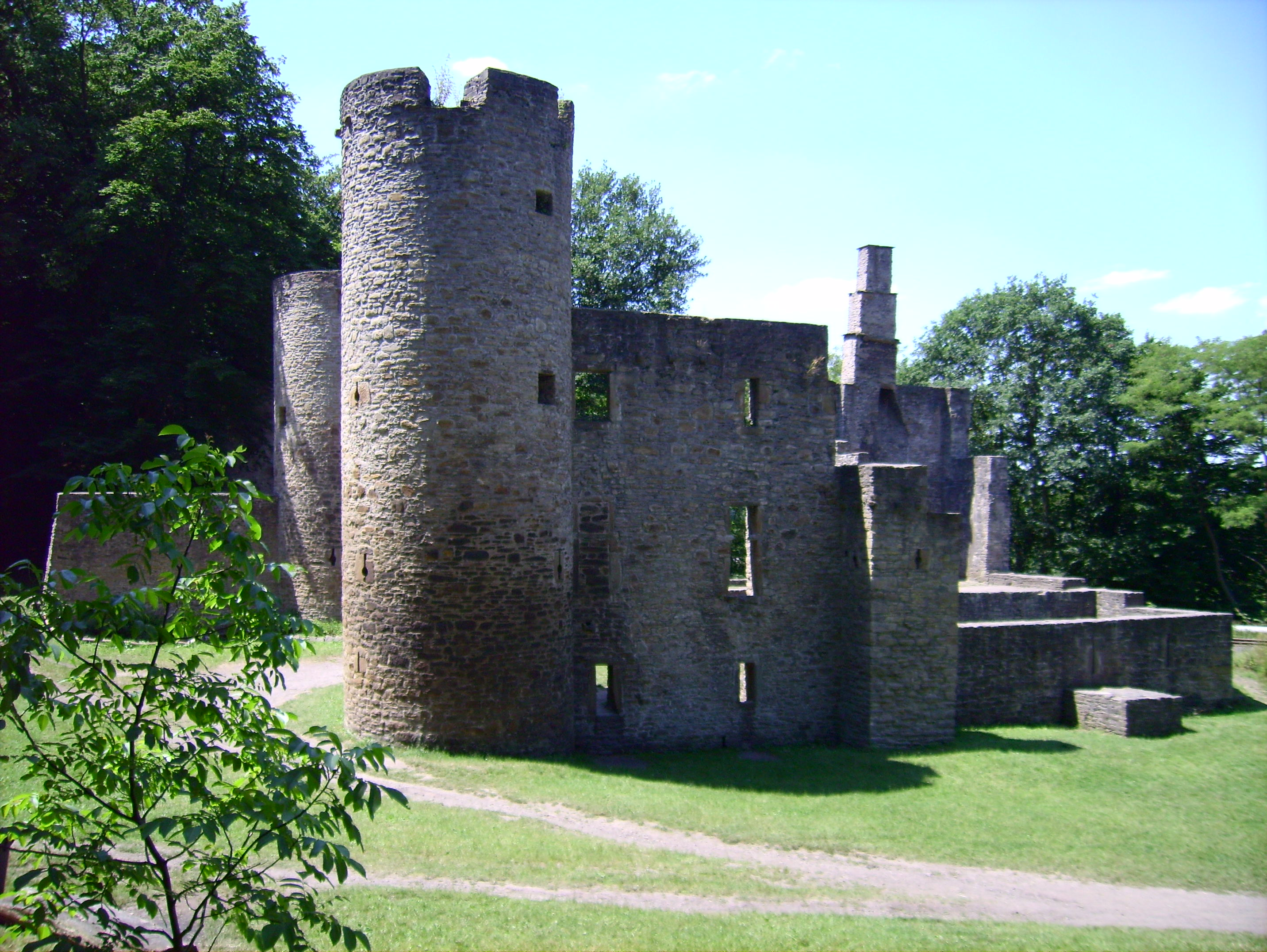
Ruins of Hardenstein Castle

- Steinbüchel Castle (Steinbüchel), attested 1429
  Sutthausen Castle, held c. 1438–1848
- Hardenstein Castle (Witten), held c. 1439–1525; now a maintained ruin
- Sutthausen Castle (Osnabrück), held c. 1438–1848; now a Franciscan convent
- Nergena Castle (Goch), held 14th century
- Hof Beckmann (Bochum), acquired 1452; now part of Ruhr University Bochum
- Steinhausen Castle (Witten), held 1455–1732

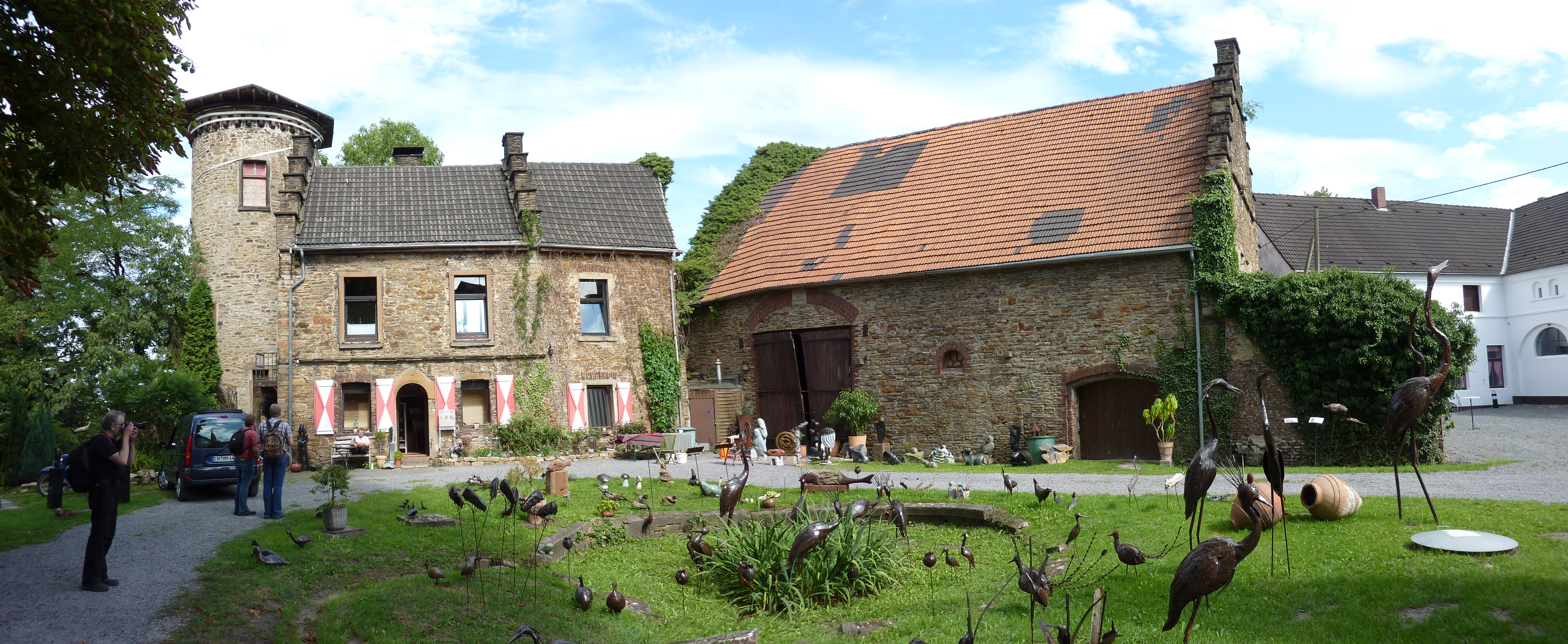
Steinhausen Castle

- Heisingen Castle (Essen-Heisingen), held c. 1458–1696

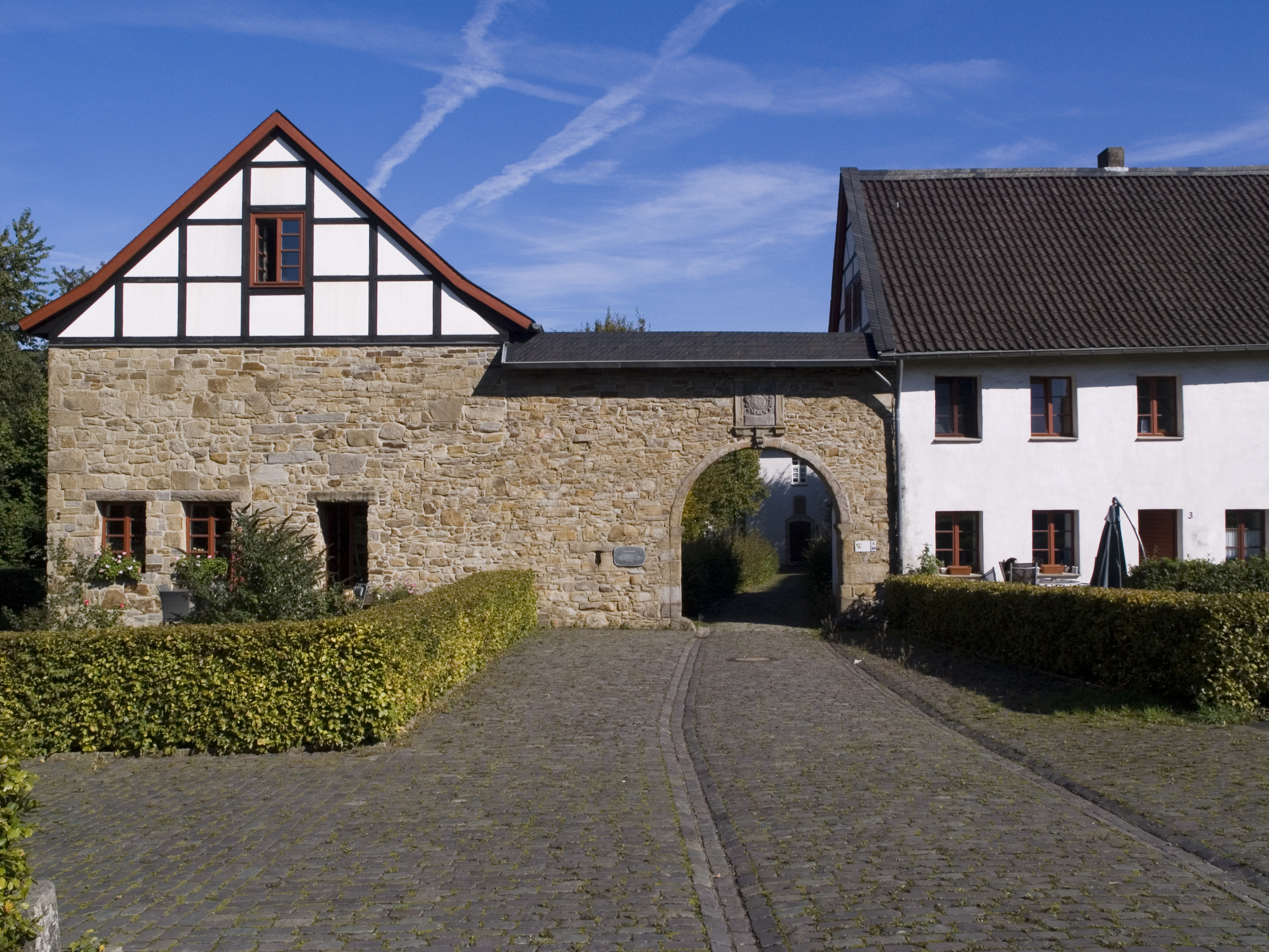
Heisingen Castle gatehouse

- Kliff Manor (near Hattingen), attested 1470
- Uedem Manor, attested 1478
- Eschmar Manor (Troisdorf), attested 1485
- Mühlfurt Manor (Grevenbroich), held c. 1481–1563
- Hardenberg Castle (Velbert-Neviges), attested 1497
- Herbeck Manor (Hagen), held 1497–1659
- Rheidt Manor (Niederkassel), held c. 1500–c. 1547
- Ickern Castle (Ickern, near Dortmund), held 1500s–c. 1580
- Gensind and Halswigk Manors, held 1505 – c. 1600s; enfeoffed by Werden Abbey to Robert Staël von Holstein
- Bergheim Manor (Bergheim, Troisdorf), held 1512–1520
- Stael Manor, near Roisdorf (Bornheim), attested 1577
- Vortlage Manor (near Lengerich), attested 1580
- Herl Castle (Merheim), held 1601–1702
- Eulenburg Manor (near Bensberg), held 1650–1709
- Martfeld Castle (Schwelm), held 1659–1724; now the municipal museum of Schwelm

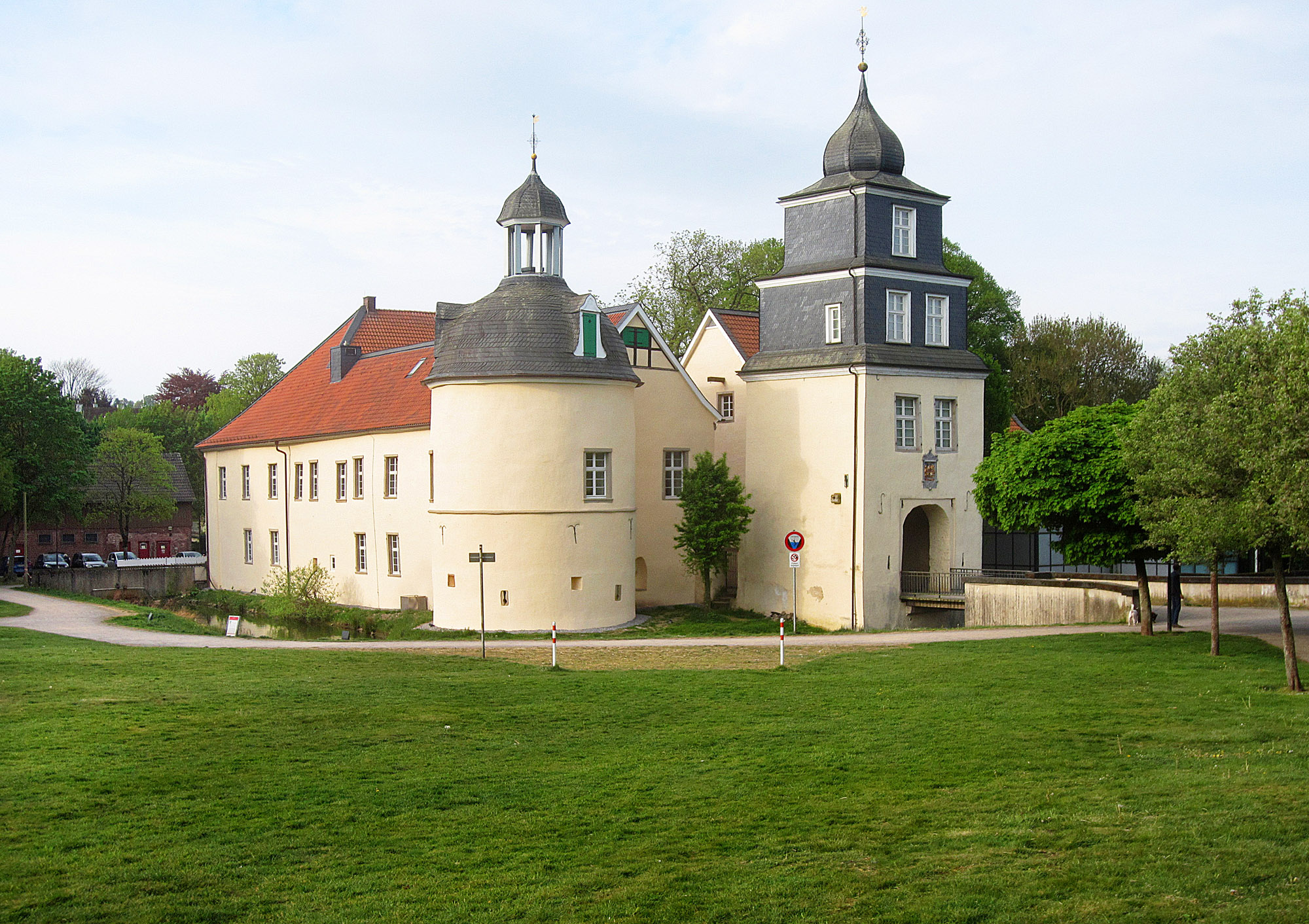
Martfeld Castle

- Milspe Manor (Ennepetal), attested 1699
- Sauernbach Manor, attested 1766
- Sechtem Manor (Bornheim), held 1780–1807
- Wulften Manor (Osnabrück), held 1782–1848

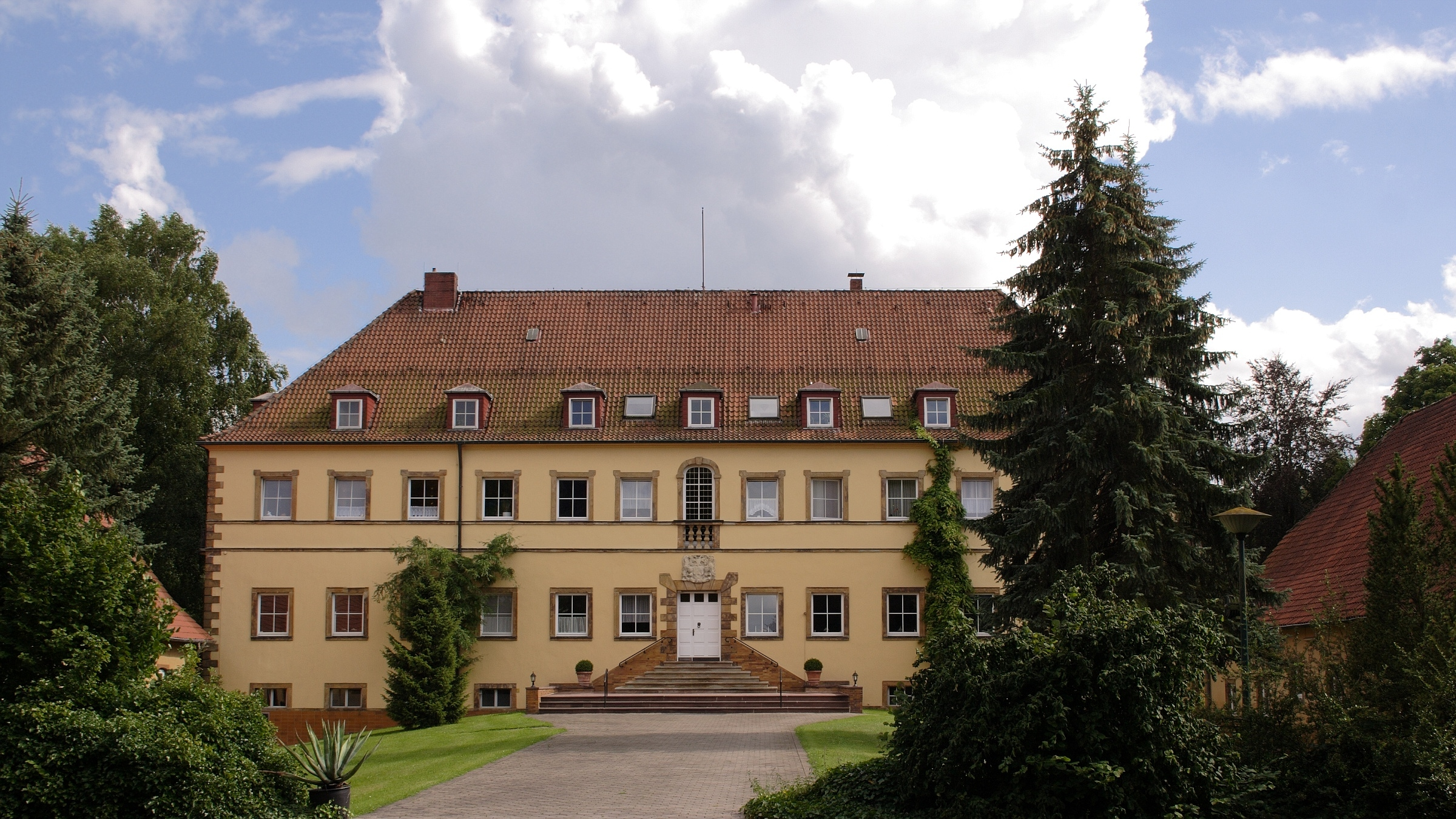
Wulften Manor

- Nette Manor (near Osnabrück), attested 1788
- Rheine Manor, held 1807–1823
- Berensterz Manor (Wermelskirchen) and Schönholthausen, dates uncertain

== Livonia and the Baltic ==
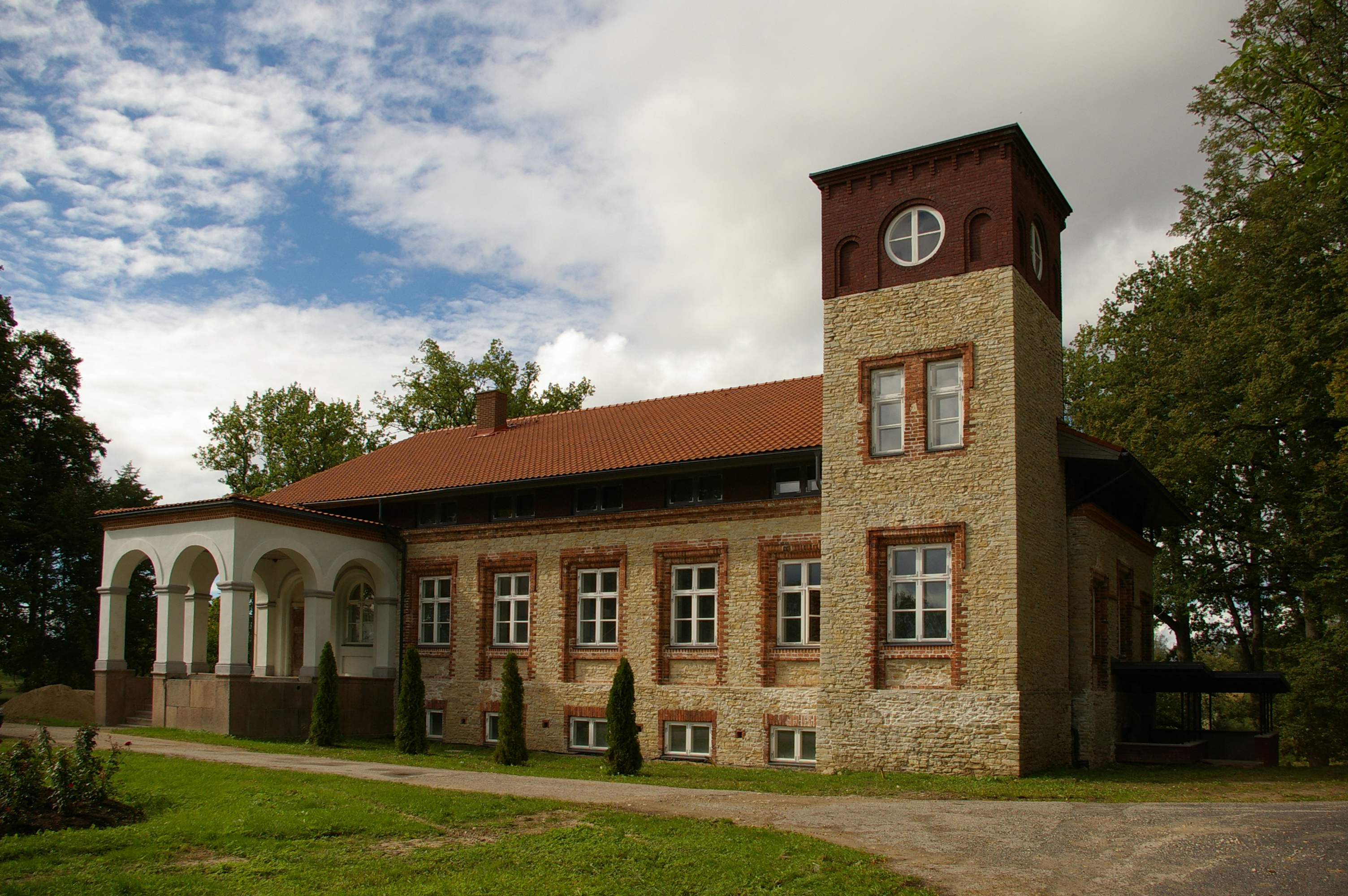
Staëlenhof (Taali Manor), held 1619–1919

From the late 15th century the family held numerous estates across Livonia, Ingria, and the Baltic Governorates, first as vassals and officers of the Livonian Order and later under Swedish and Russian rule.

=== Estonia ===
- Torma and Ubja Manors (near Wesenberg, Lääne-Viru County), held c. 1487–1511
- Meks Manor, now Ravila (Kose Parish, Harju County), held c. 1500–1527

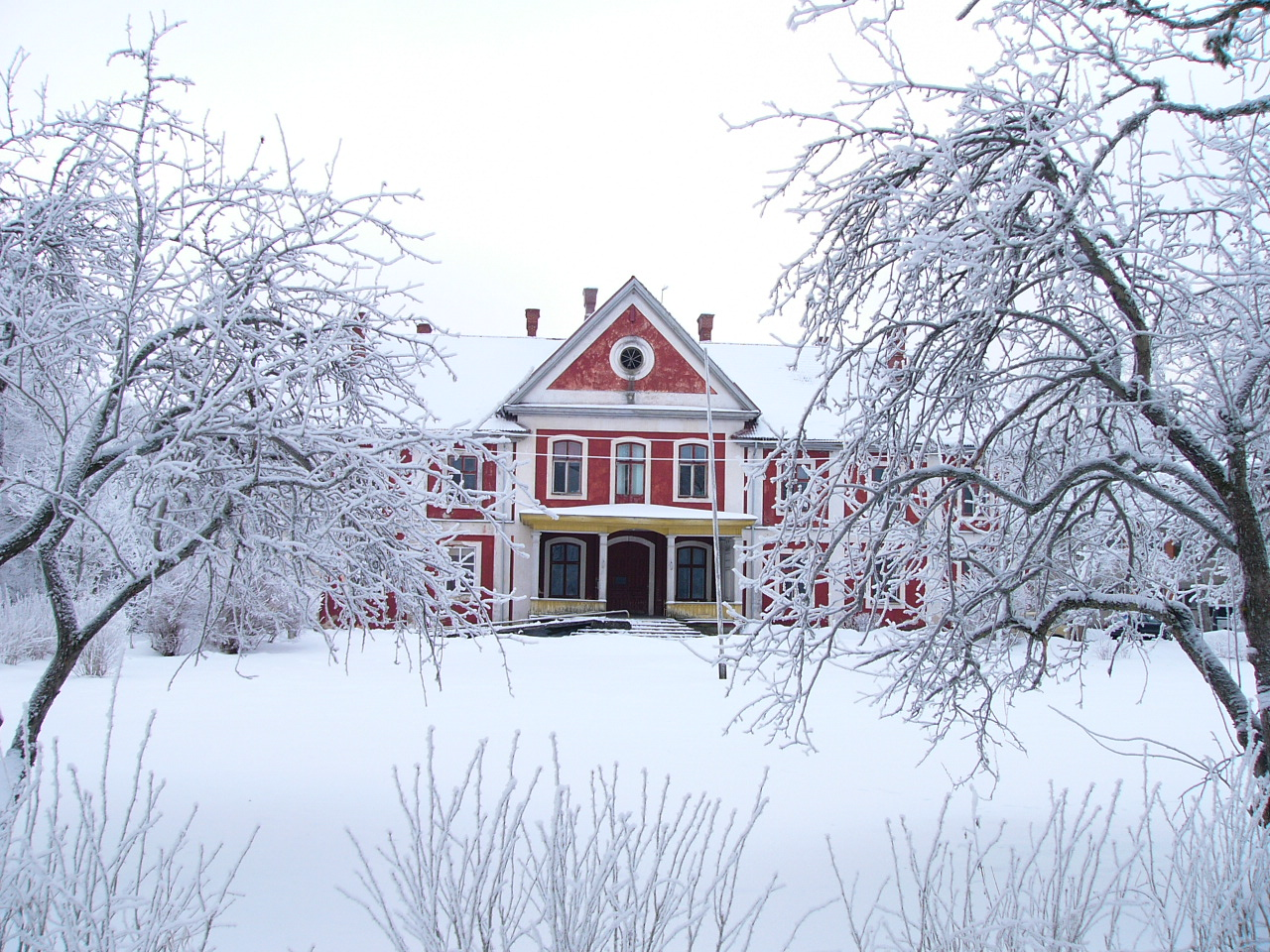
Meks Manor (Ravila)

- Teenuse Manor (Martna Parish, Lääne County), held 16th century
- Sonorm Manor, now Roosna-Alliku (Järva County), held c. 1500–1527
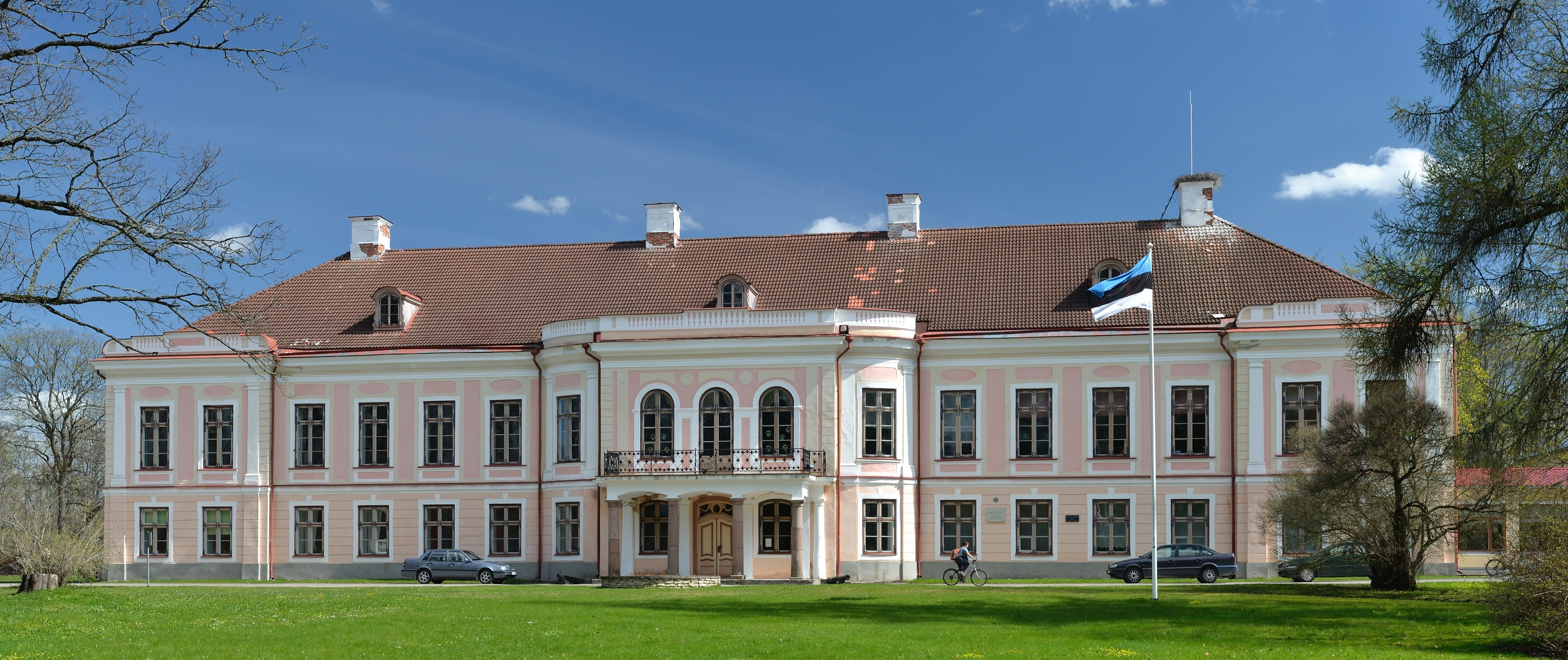
  Sonorm Manor (Roosna-Alliku)
- Wasahof (Vaivara Parish, near Narva), held 17th century until lost in the Great Northern War
- Groß-Soldina and Klein-Soldina (Vaivara Parish, near Narva), held 17th century until lost in the Great Northern War
- Goldina (Vaivara Parish, near Narva), held 17th century until lost in the Great Northern War
- Anija Manor (Hannijöggi), now Anija (Harju-Jaani Parish, Harju County), held 1671–1840

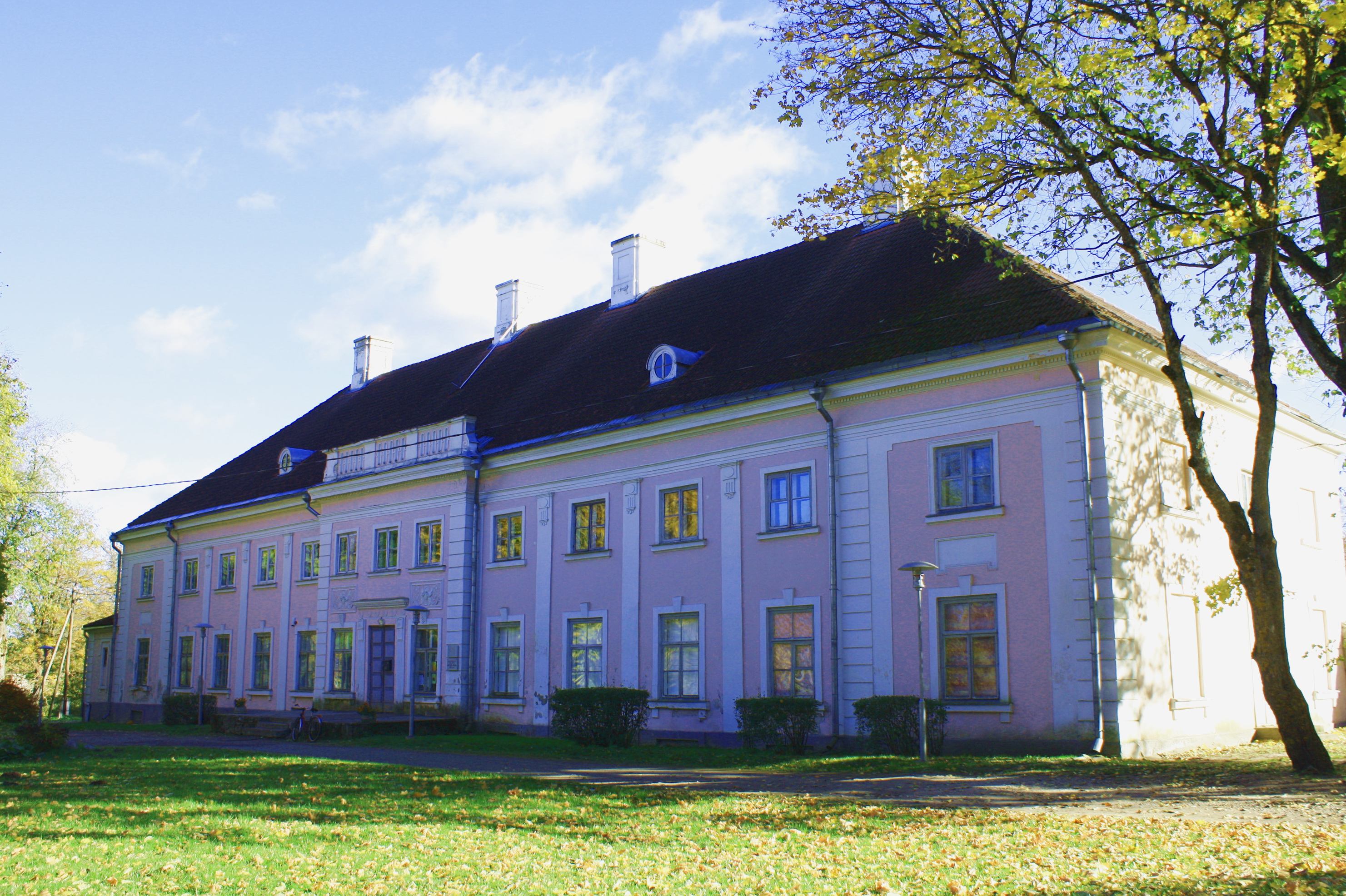
Anija Manor, held 1671–1840

- Jeglecht Manor (Jõelähtme) (Harju County), held with Anija, 1671–1840
- Undel Manor (Kadrina Parish, Lääne-Viru County), held 1735–1769
- Känick Manor (Harju County; adjunct of Kotzum from 1769), held 1769–1857
- Rummu Manor (Jõelähtme Parish, Harju County), held 1758–1857
- Kotzum Manor, now Kodasoo (Kuusalu Parish, Harju County), held 1769–1857

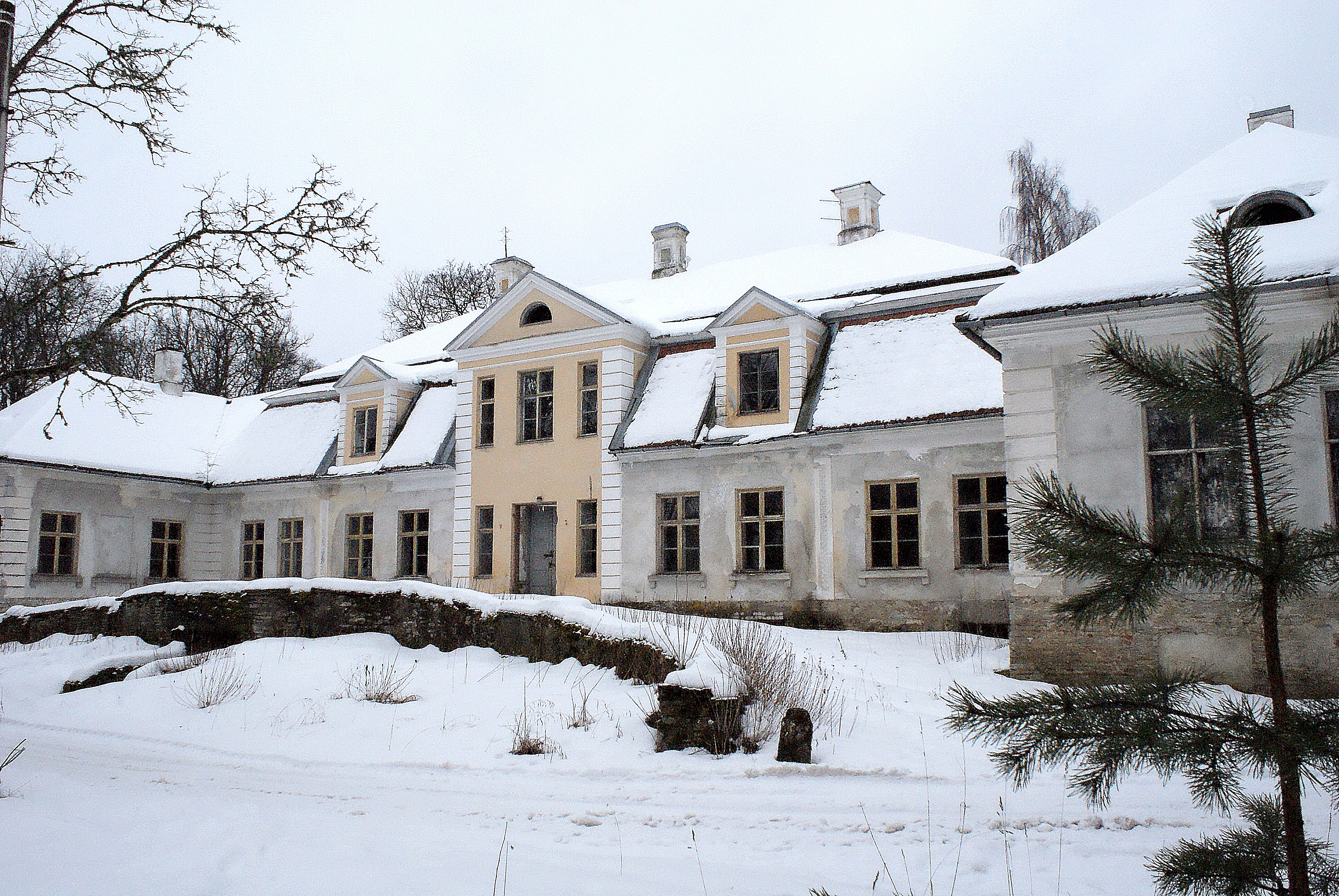
Kotzum Manor (Kodasoo)

- Assik Manor, now Päinurme (Peetri Parish, Järva County), held c. 1700–1772
- Saha Manor (Saage) (Jõelähtme Parish, Harju County), held 1807–1840
- Kuusiku Manor (Rapla Parish), held early 19th century
- Samm Manor, now Samma, held to 1919
- Staëlenhof, now Taali Manor (Tori Parish, Pärnu County), held 1619–1919
- Tammist Manor, now Tammiste (Pärnu County), held 1619–1812
- Surri Manor, now Surju (Pärnu County), held 1819–1919
- Uulu Manor (Uulu, Pärnu County), held 1819–1919
- Tõstamaa Manor (Tõstamaa Parish, Pärnu County), held 1831–1919
- Waldhof Castle, now Vaskrääma (Pärnu County), held 1819–1918
- Sindi Manor (Pärnu County), held 1819–1918
- Lindi Manor (Audru Parish, Pärnu County), leased, 17th century

=== Latvia ===
- Pebalg Castle (Vecpiebalga Parish), held 16th century
  Treyden Castle (Turaida)
- Kujen and Heydenfeld Manors (Lasdohn parish, southern Livonia), held 1661–1751
- Hintzenberg Manor (Stahlenhof, parish of Neuermühlen), held 1662–1682
- Ramkau Manor (southern Livonia), held 1670–1732
- Ķeipene Manor (Riga district), held 18th century
- Treyden Castle (Turaida) and Aula (Vidzeme), held until the 1920 Latvian land reform

=== Ingria ===
- Lawoja Manor (Koporje County), attested 1661
- Liliehagen Manor (Koporje County), held 1664 until lost in the Great Northern War
- Duderhof Manor, now part of southern Saint Petersburg, held 17th century until lost in the Great Northern War

== Sweden ==
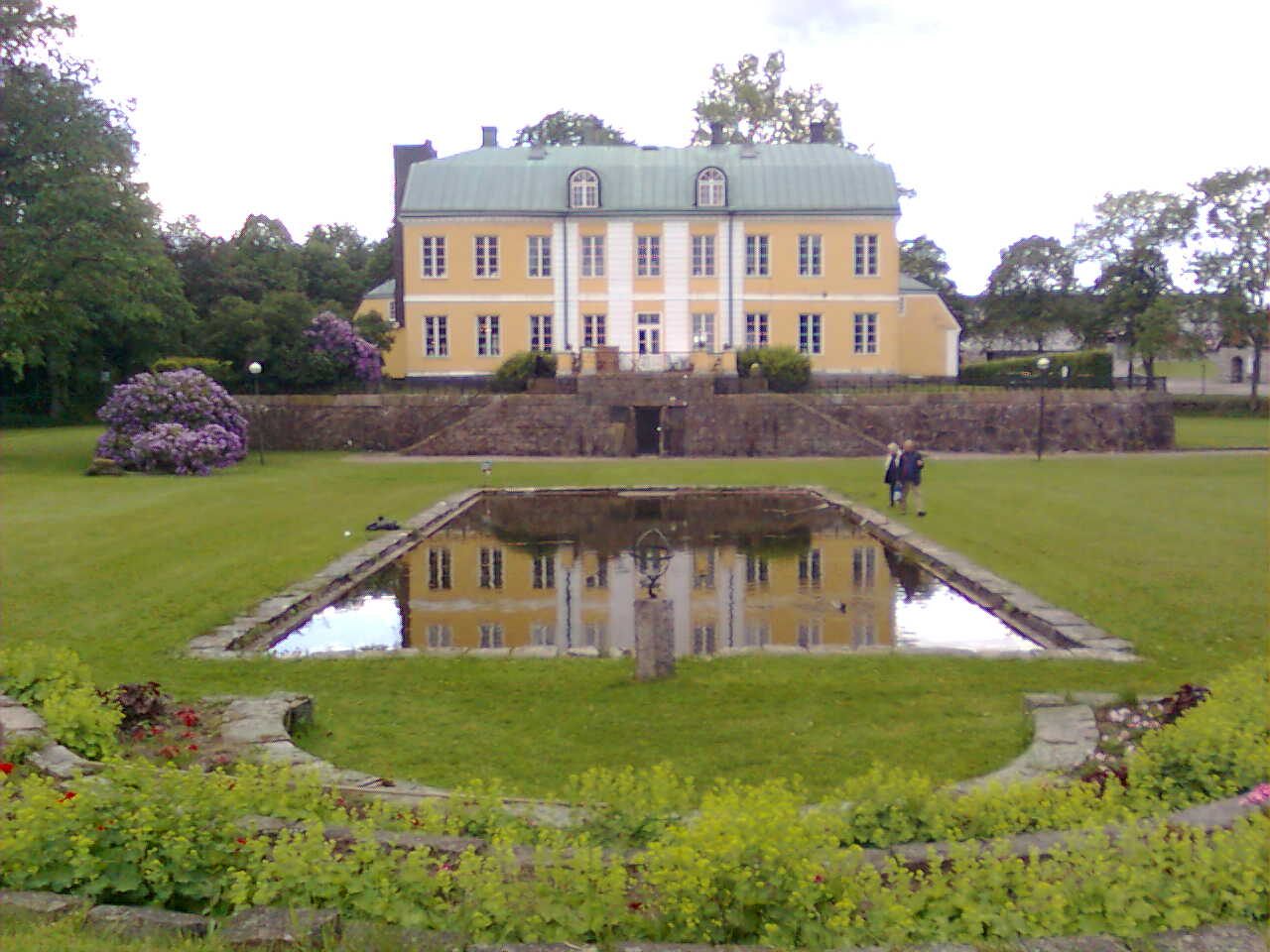
Vapnö Castle

- Vapnö Castle (Halmstad, Halland), purchased by George Bogislaus Staël von Holstein in 1741
- Arlösa Manor (Halmstad, Halland), held 1820–1876

== Russian Empire ==
From the 18th century the Russian branch established itself in Saint Petersburg, Moscow, and the Voronezh Governorate through marriage alliances into the imperial aristocracy, acquiring estates across these regions and, in the 19th century, in Bessarabia.

- Town mansions in Saint Petersburg, early 18th century–1917
- Alexeyevskoye Manor and its surrounding villages (Repnoye, Voronezh Oblast), held 1837–1917
- Nikolskoye Manor (near Voronezh), held 1837–1917
- Otradnoe Manor (Otradnoe, Voronezh Oblast), held 1830s–1917; the settlement's coat of arms bears eight bezants drawn from the family's arms
- Sofyino Manor (near Voronezh), with a brickworks stamping its bricks "SH", held to 1917
- Estates in the Kursk Governorate, held mid-19th century
- Estates in the Akkerman district of Bessarabia, held from the mid-19th century until the Romanian land reform

== France ==
- Le Castelet (Ménerbes, Vaucluse), a former fort bought by the painter Nicolas de Staël in 1953

== See also ==
- Staël von Holstein
- Baltic nobility
- Manor houses in Estonia
