= Wipperfelder Bach =

River in Germany

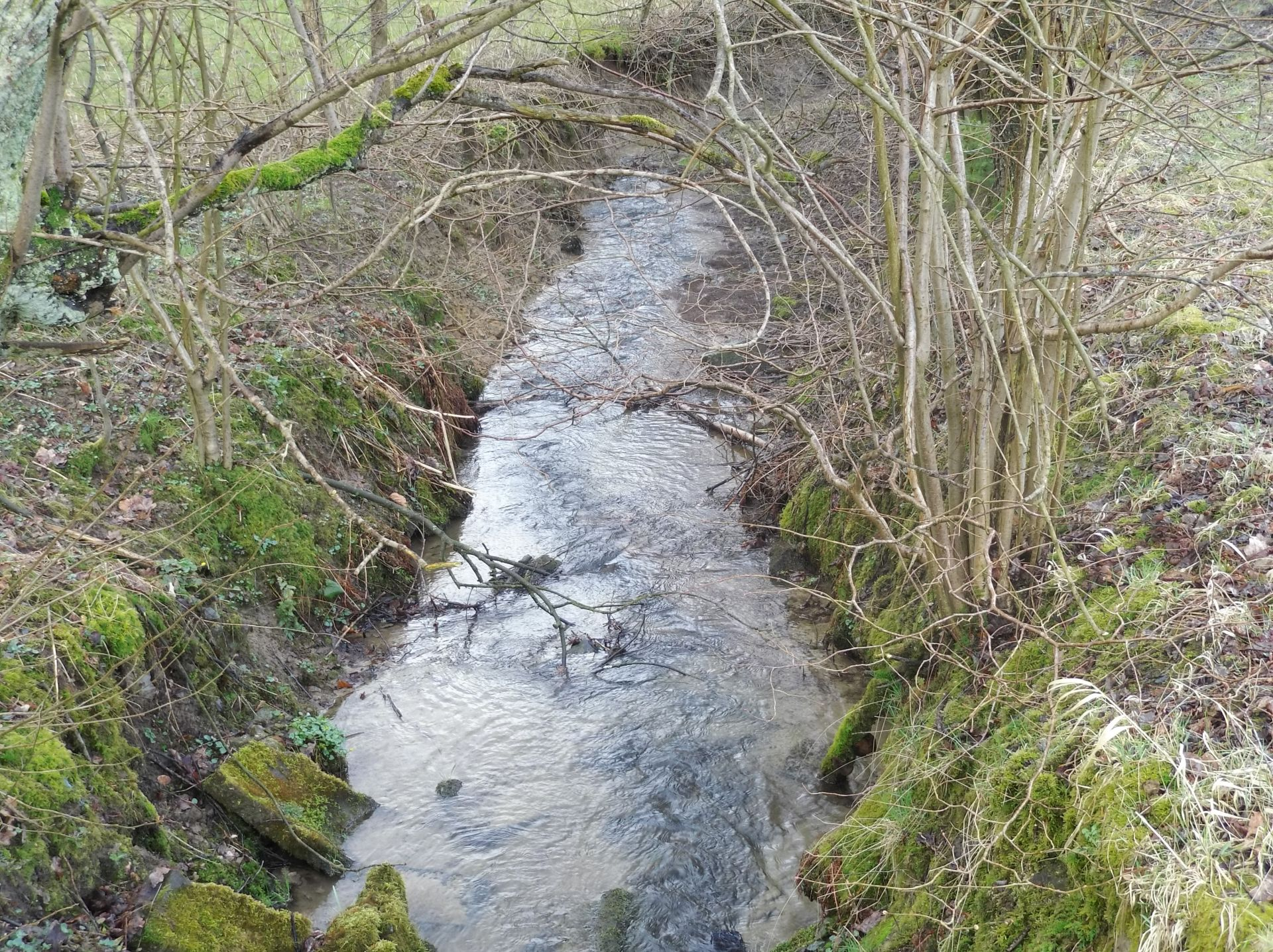

Location
- Country: Germany
- State: North Rhine-Westphalia

Physical characteristics
- Source
  - elevation: 271 metres (889 ft)
- Mouth
  - location: Kürtener Sülz
  - coordinates: 51.0692°N 7.3207°E
- Length: 3.4 kilometres (2.1 mi)
- Basin size: 3 km^{2} (1.2 sq mi)
- Depth
  - average: 25 centimetres (0.82 ft)

Basin features
- Progression: Kürtener Sülz→ Sülz→ Agger→ Sieg→ Rhine→ North Sea

Wipperfelder Bach is a river of North Rhine-Westphalia, Germany. It is 3.4 kilometres (2.1 mi) long. It is an orographic right tributary of the Kürtener Sülz.

== Topography ==
The river rises at the southern edge of Unterholl at 271 metres (889 ft) above sea level. From here, the creek flows south. The river drains a catchment area of about 3 square kilometres (1.2 sq mi). The Wipper Felderbach has an average water depth of about 25 centimetres (0.82 ft).

== Ecosystem ==
One of the native animals of the river is the Brown Trout.

== See also ==
- List of rivers of North Rhine-Westphalia
