= Brunsbach =

Brunsbach may refer to:

- Brunsbach (Sülz), a river of North Rhine-Westphalia, Germany, tributary of the Sülz
- Brunsbach (Wupper), a river of North Rhine-Westphalia, Germany, tributary of the Wupper
