= Elvy Kalep =

Estonian aviator and artist

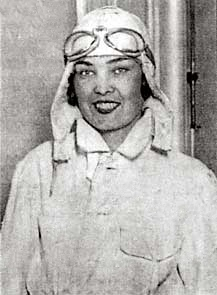
- Elvy Kalep in 1930
- Born: Alviine-Johanna Kalep; 26 June 1899; Taali, Tori Parish, Kreis Pernau, Governorate of Livonia, Russian Empire
- Died: 15 August 1989 (aged 90); Lake Worth, Florida, U.S.
- Occupations: Aviator, author, artist
- Known for: First Estonian female pilot

Alviine-Johanna Kalep (26 June 1899 – 15 August 1989), known as Elvy Kalep, was an Estonian aviator and the country's first female pilot, as well as an artist, toy designer and a one-time children's author.

Kalep grew up in Estonia and Russia, and subsequently moved to China to escape the Russian Civil War. She worked briefly as an interpreter for military officials in China before settling in Paris to study art with Alexandre Jacovleff. In 1931, she qualified as a pilot in Germany, becoming the first Estonian female pilot. Befriending American aviator Amelia Earhart, she joined the Ninety-Nines and took up the cause of encouraging other women to take up aviation. She wrote and illustrated a children's book about flying, Air Babies, which was first published in 1936.

After settling in the United States, Kalep founded a toy manufacturing business in New York. Although she was forced to close the business in 1946 due to her poor health, she made a living through the 1950s by selling patents to toy designs to larger businesses. In later decades, she created artworks out of leather, which she exhibited across the United States. She died in Florida in 1989.

== Early life ==
Kalep was born on 26 June 1899 in the village of Taali in Tori Parish, Pärnu County. She was the only child of Joanna (née Liidemann) and locksmith Aksel Emil, who both died when she was a young girl. She attended Tallinna Tütarlaste Kommertsgümnaasium, a girls' secondary school in Tallinn. As a teenager, Kalep moved to Russia to live with an aunt in Saint Petersburg. She witnessed the events that sparked the February Revolution in 1917, and spent a night in police detention as an eyewitness. She made a failed attempt to flee at the outset of the revolution, during which time she witnessed six men being shot while waiting in line to buy train tickets out of the country. She and her aunt moved to Vladivostok, where she married a Russian general, Count Slastšov, and had a son. She lived in Vladivostok for eight years, during which time she made numerous escape efforts, before her new family was able to successfully flee to China, a refuge they chose because of Slastšov's ties to Zhang Zuolin.

Within a year of arriving in Harbin, China, Kalep's son died and her husband disappeared. Kalep was able to support herself by working as an interpreter—she spoke Russian, German, English and Chinese—for a British general in Shenyang. She was also employed by Zhang Zuolin and later his son, Zhang Xueliang, but decided to return to Estonia in 1925. She traveled through Indonesia, Italy and France before eventually arriving in Tallinn in 1926. Soon afterwards she settled in Paris, where she studied the art of oil painting with Russian painter Alexandre Jacovleff. She married Rolf Baron von Hoeningen-Bergendorff, who was of German or Austrian descent.

== Aviation career ==
Kalep took up flying in the late 1920s, when she met Dutch aviator Anthony Fokker while holidaying in St. Moritz and asked him to teach her to fly a plane. She completed five hours of flying with Fokker and, after breaking her arm during a sledding accident in the winter of 1931, took her pilot's test in Germany on 1 August 1931. She passed, becoming the first qualified female pilot from Estonia, and the seventh woman to pass the exam in Germany. Soon after receiving her license, Kalep and Valter Mayer, a German mechanic, co-piloted a small Klemm plane from Berlin through the Baltic region, stopping in Szczecin, Gdańsk, Kaunas, Jelgava and Riga, finally landing in Tallinn on 18 August. Upon her arrival in Tallinn, Kalep was greeted by a crowd of journalists and officers of the Estonian Air Force; she briefly visited relatives in Nõmme before beginning her return journey to Amsterdam.

In May 1932, Kalep traveled from France to New York on the steamship SS Paris with the intention of flying back to Europe across the Atlantic Ocean; at the time, no woman had made a solo transatlantic flight. She befriended American aviation pioneer Amelia Earhart, who, unbeknownst to Kalep, was planning a similar feat. After Earhart's successful flight from Canada to Ireland on 20 May, Kalep decided that it would not be worthwhile to make her own attempt at flying across the Atlantic, since she would no longer be the first woman to do so. She continued to encourage other women to enter the field of aviation, however, and became a member of the Ninety-Nines, an international organisation for women pilots which was founded by Earhart and 98 other female aviators. In August 1932, Kalep planned to fly with Roger Q. Williams from Los Angeles to Athens to celebrate the former city's hosting of the 1932 Summer Olympics, but their flight was canceled. Soon after, it was reported that Kalep had remarried to W. E. Hutton-Miller, an American stockbroker.

In 1936, Kalep published the first edition of Air Babies, a children's book that she wrote and illustrated to teach children about flying. The story followed two young planes, Happy Wings and Speedy, and a 1938 reprint included a foreword from Earhart, who embarked on her last flight three days after writing the piece; she disappeared while flying in 1937. Kalep later said of Earhart's disappearance: "I miss her very much. When I heard that Amelia had disappeared, well, I fell apart." She visited the 1939 New York World's Fair to promote Air Babies on television and to speak at the National Woman's Party luncheon.

== Art and design career ==
After the outbreak of World War II in 1939, and with the dissolution of her third marriage, Kalep began a new business venture in the American toy market. She designed a doll named Patsie Parachute which, when thrown into the air, would fall down slowly as a parachutist would. The dolls were produced in a New York factory where Kalep herself was forced to work to sustain the business. Her health deteriorated, however, and her profits from the business were spent almost entirely on medical costs; she was forced to close the factory in 1946. She had recovered by 1950 and made a living by selling patents for toy designs to larger businesses. One of her successful designs was Scribbles Dolls—toy dolls with blank faces that could be individually decorated by children—which was inspired by the 50,000 doll heads she had left over from the closure of the Patsie Parachute factory.

In the 1960s, while living in Palm Beach, Florida, Kalep began creating leather artworks which she sold to her neighbours to make a living. She created three-dimensional paintings made out of small pieces of coloured leather imported from France. Throughout the 1970s she showcased her art in exhibitions across the United States and sold works to high-profile customers including Eugene Ormandy.

== Death ==
Kalep died on 15 August 1989, aged 90, in the Regency Health Care Center of Lake Worth, Florida. She had lived in the facility since 1986. She had been married three times but had no surviving family at the time of her death. Obituaries for Kalep were published in the Florida newspaper the Sun-Sentinel and Vaba Eesti Sõna, an Estonian-language newspaper published in New York.
