= Kotzum Manor =

- Kodasoo mõis (Estonian)
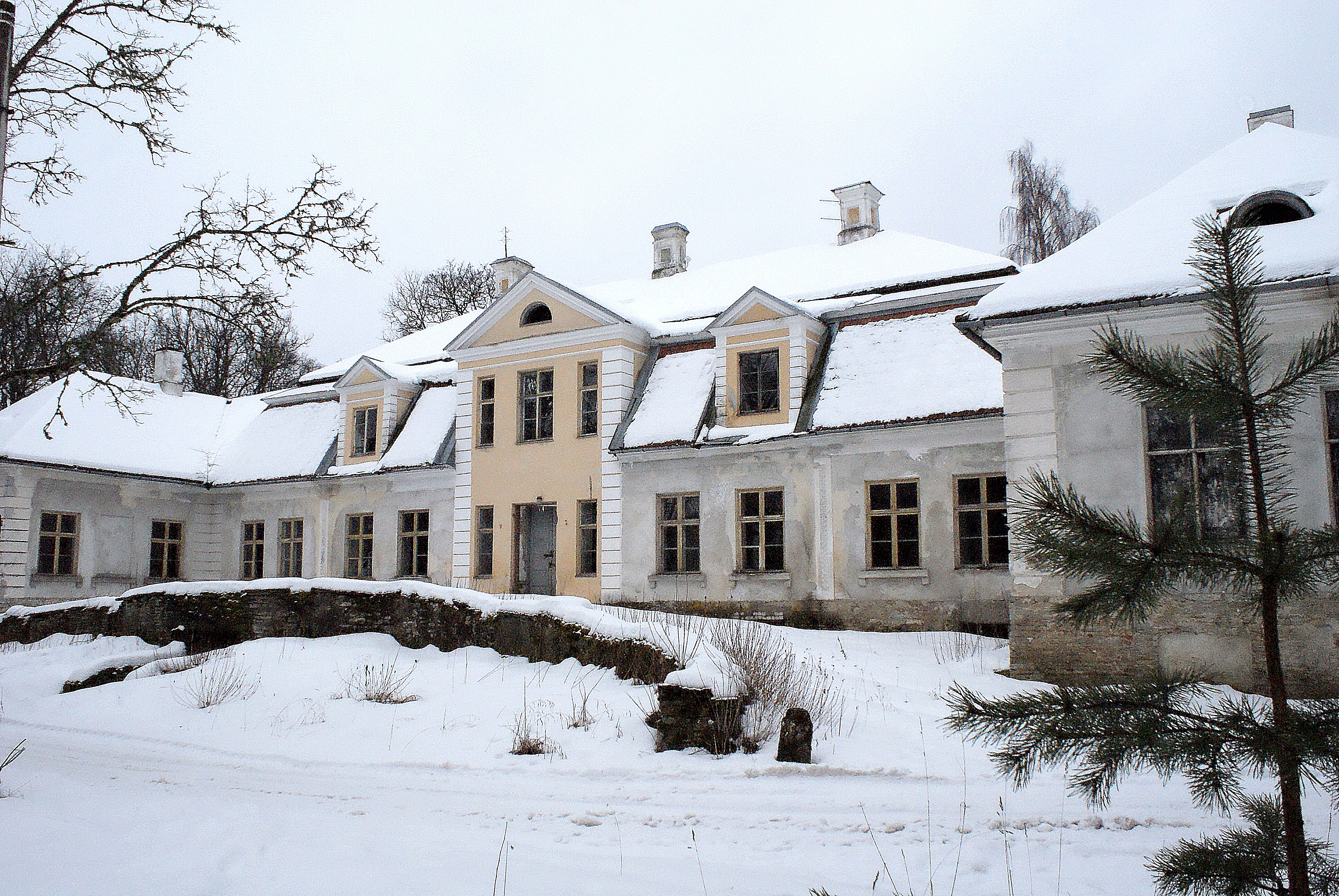
- Main building
- Interactive map of Kotzum Manor
- 59°26′45″N 25°16′4″E
- Type: Manor house
- Location: Kodasoo, Kuusalu Parish, Harju County, Estonia

History
- Built: 1770s

Site notes
- Architectural style: Early Classicist

Kotzum Manor (German: Kotzum; Estonian: Kodasoo mõis) is a former knightly manor in Kodasoo, Kuusalu Parish, Harju County, in northern Estonia. Historically it belonged to Kuusalu Parish.

== History ==
The estate was first mentioned in 1485, as Kottasem. In 1749 it was bought by Adam Johann von Tiesenhausen. The Staël von Holstein family held the manor from 1769 until 1857. From 1857 until nationalization in 1919 the manor belonged to the Rehbinder family, the last owner being Count Alexander Rehbinder.

== Manor complex ==
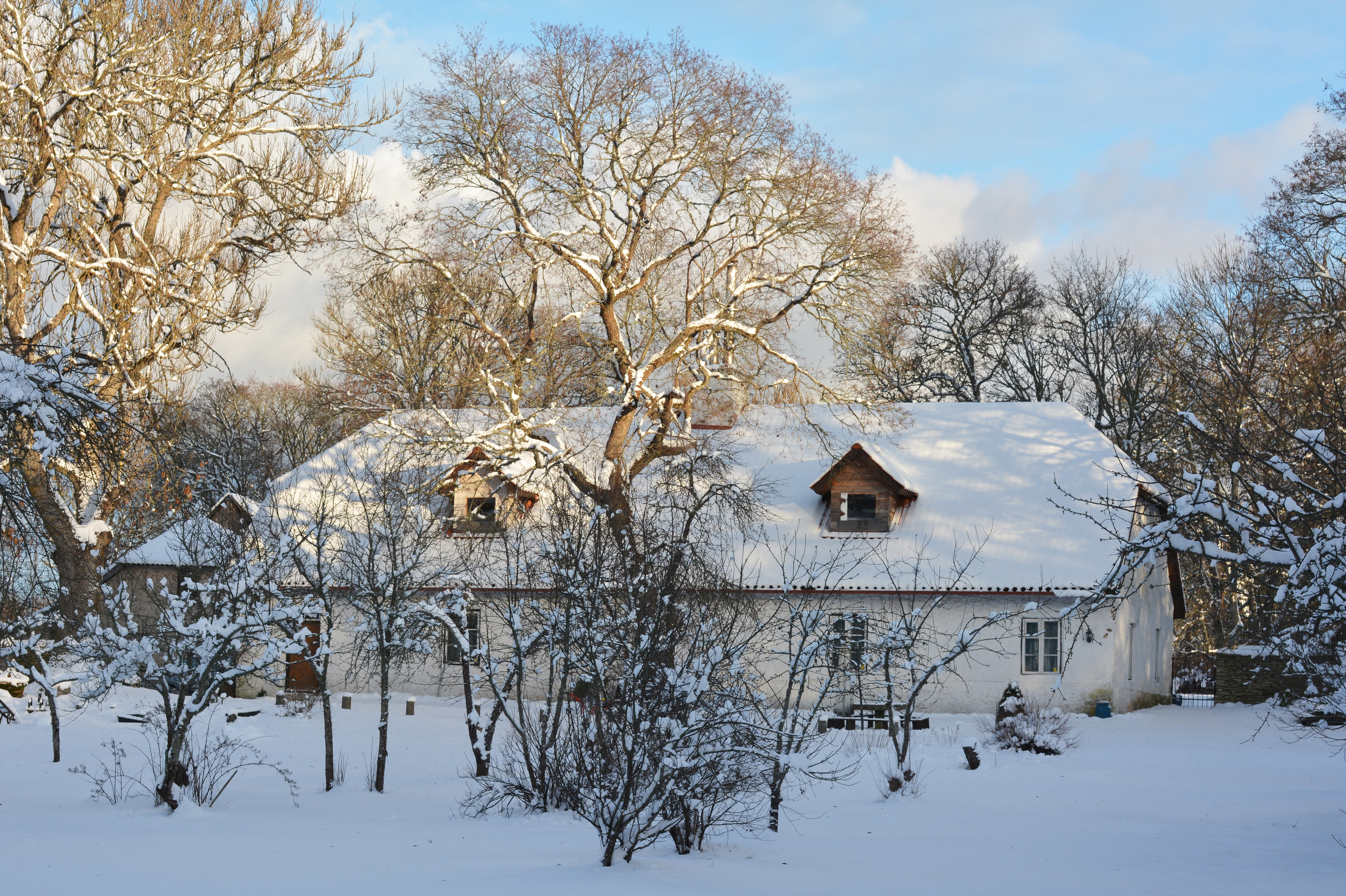
Manor house

Around 1770 the cavalry major Karl Gustav Staël von Holstein had the largely single-story main building erected in early Classicist style, with projecting wings, rusticated corners, and walls articulated by pilaster strips. The center of both the front and rear facades is marked by a projection topped with a triangular pediment three windows wide. An older building from the early 18th century survives and later served as the estate manager's house.

The estate also includes a barn, stables, and a carriage house facing the main building. The main building, the park, and eight outbuildings are entered in the Estonian national register of cultural monuments.

== See also ==
- Staël von Holstein
- Staël von Holstein family residences
- List of palaces and manor houses in Estonia
