= Brunsbach (Sülz) =

River in Germany

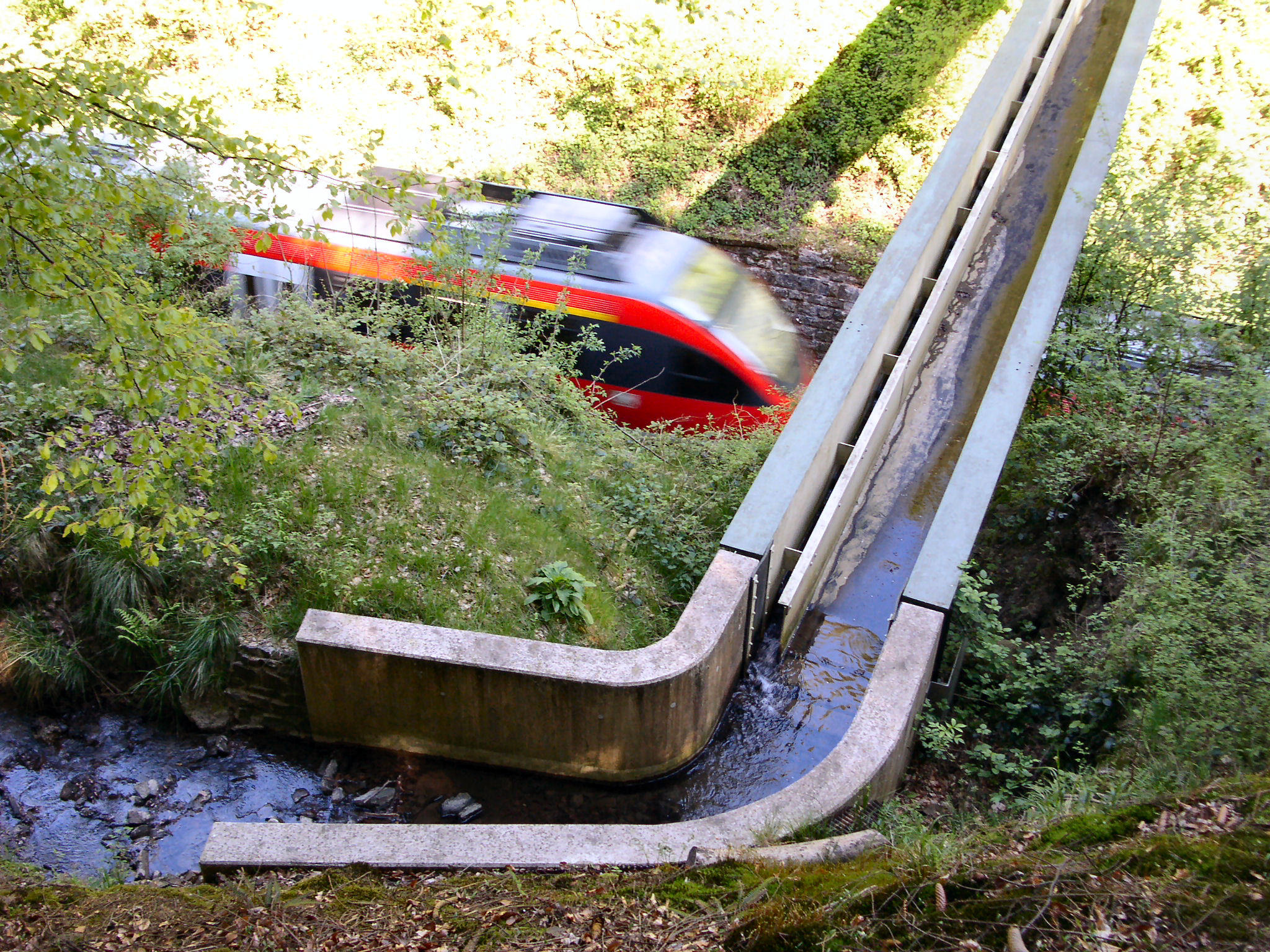

Location
- Country: Germany
- State: North Rhine-Westphalia

Physical characteristics
- Mouth
  - location: Sülz
  - coordinates: 50.9144°N 7.1958°E

Basin features
- Progression: Sülz→ Agger→ Sieg→ Rhine→ North Sea

Brunsbach (also: Knipperbach) is a small river of North Rhine-Westphalia, Germany. It is a left tributary of the Sülz. It flows into the Sülz near Rösrath.

== See also ==
- List of rivers of North Rhine-Westphalia
