= Tammist Manor =

- Tammiste mõis (Estonian)
- Interactive map of Tammist Manor
- 58°22′28″N 24°34′02″E
- Type: Manor house
- Location: Tammiste, Pärnu, Pärnu County, Estonia

History
- Built: Probably second half of the 16th century

Site notes
- Architectural style: Historicist

Tammist Manor (Estonian: Tammiste mõis) is a former knightly estate in the former Pärnu parish, Pärnu County, Estonia. The manor lies today on the bank of the Pärnu River in the Tammiste district of Pärnu. The historical main building survives and forms part of the Tammiste care home complex.

== History ==
A farm called Tampste is recorded in 1560, and by 1601 and 1638 Tammest appears as a manor. The estate was probably founded in the second half of the 16th century.

In the Middle Ages the Tammiste lands belonged to the Pärnu commandery of the Livonian Order. The original fortified manor is thought to have been destroyed during the Livonian War.

The existing building was first held by the Staël von Holstein family from 1619 until 1812. By the 19th century the manor had passed to the Seeberg family. Between 1865 and 1890 the estate grounds became a popular venue for the people of Pärnu, hosting concerts and public events. After Alexander von Seeberg died in 1901, the manor was sold at auction to Josef David Wulff, a merchant of Riga and of the Moscow second guild; he was its last private owner before the Estonian land reform of 1919. In 1917 part of the estate was bought by the Sindi cloth factory. The manor was expropriated in the 1919 land reform, though the complex remained in the factory's use under lease, and much of the former manor land was parceled into smallholdings in 1924. In 1919 the riverside lands and the manor house were incorporated into the town of Pärnu.

== Tammiste Nursing Home ==
On 1 September 1945 the Pärnu municipal care institituion was liquidated and its inventory transferred to the Tammiste Manor complex. Today the site houses the Tammiste Nursing Home; the historical manor building is part of its premises.

== See also ==
- Staël von Holstein
- Staël von Holstein family residences
- List of palaces and manor houses in Estonia
