= Heisingen Castle =

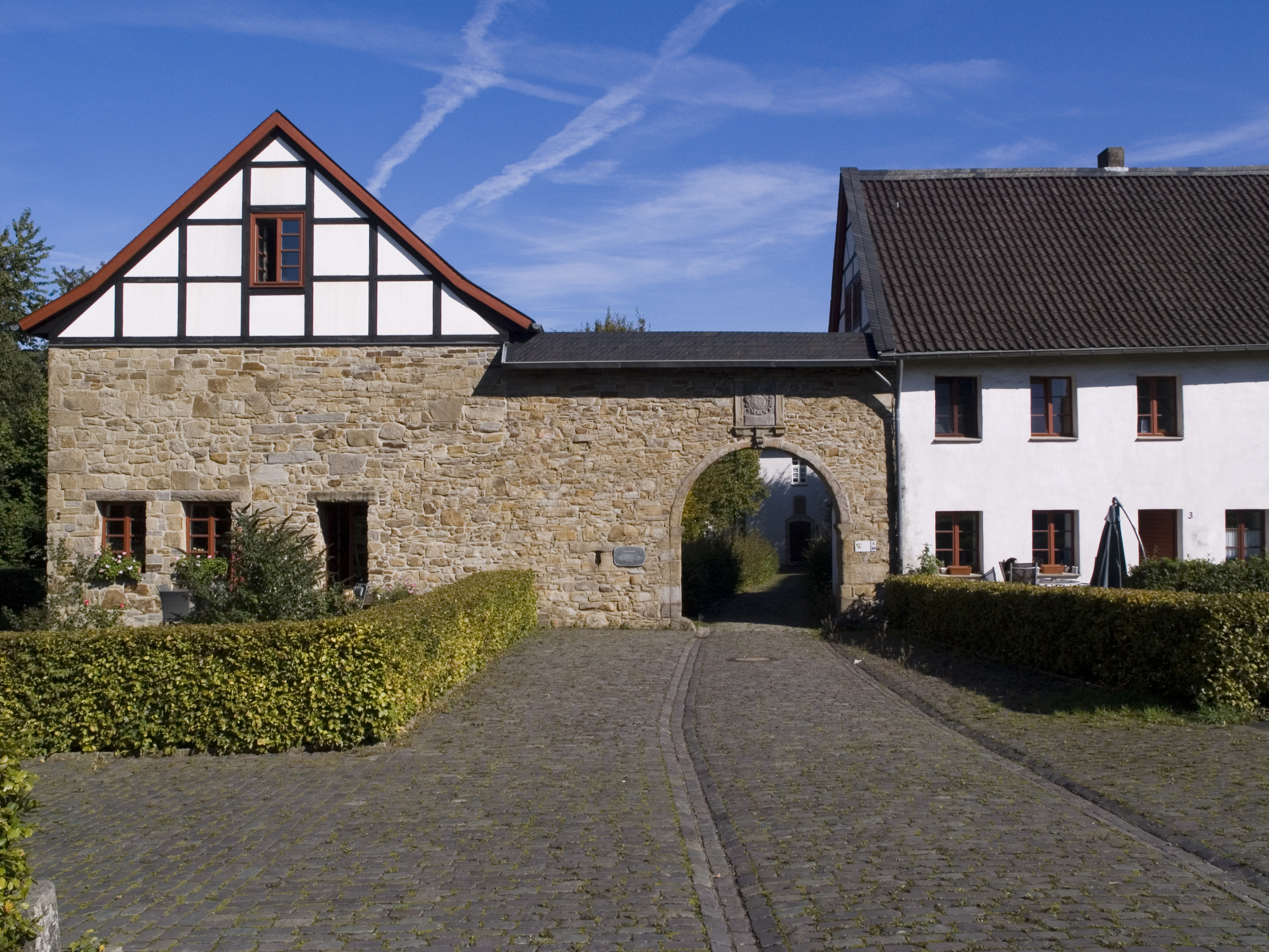
- Heisingen Castle gatehouse
- Interactive map of Heisingen Castle
- 51°24′01.7″N 7°4′27″E
- Location: Essen-Heisingen, Germany

History
- Built: 12th century

Heisingen Castle (German: Haus Heisingen) is a former Rittergut, or manor estate, on the right bank of the Ruhr in the Heisingen district of Essen, Germany. Its oldest surviving components date to the 12th century.

As a fief of Werden Abbey, it was held for more than two centuries by the barons Staël von Holstein starting in 1458, before being rebuilt in the early 18th century as a summer residence for the abbots of Werden. The complex today contains rental apartments.

== Description ==
The complex consists of a manor house and a two-winged L-shaped farm building, both dating from the 18th and 19th centuries. A rubble-stone wall bounds the site.

The manor house is the oldest component. Above its entrance are the arms of the Werden abbot Coelestin von Geismar, once accompanied by a Latin inscription recording that he incorporated the castle into the abbey of St. Ludger in 1709 and restored it from its decayed state.

The Baroque round-arched portal bears the arms of Benedikt von Geismar, who had the gate erected in the 1740s. Near the entrance, a structural survey uncovered the foundations of a round tower 6.20 meters in diameter, part of a medieval predecessor and probably demolished in 1779.

== History ==
Arms of Heisingen

The importance of the castle is reflected in the coat of arms of Heisingen, which shows the castle's round-arched stone gateway beneath red roundels, taken from the arms of the Staël von Holstein family.

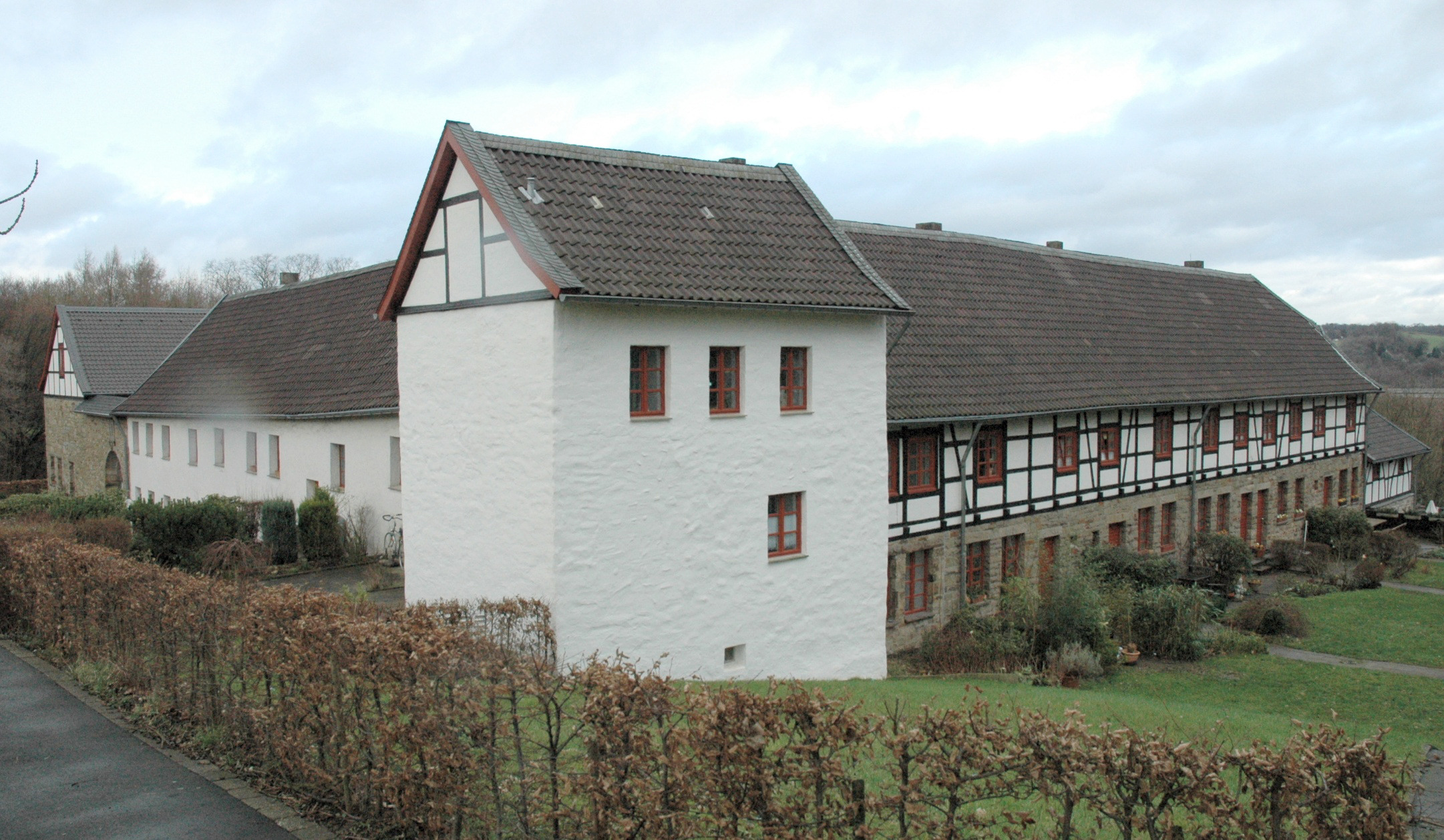
Heisingen Castle, southern façade

Heisingen Castle developed out of an Oberhof, or principal farm, of Werden Abbey; by the 11th and 12th centuries it had been fortified into a small castle, and from the early 13th century it was a Mannlehen, or male fief, of the abbey. On 31 May 1458 Ruprecht Staël von Holstein, Vogt and steward of the abbey, purchased the estate.

The Staël von Holstein held the property until 1709, when the dilapidated complex was sold for 23,000 Reichsthaler to the Werden abbot Coelestin von Geismar, who rebuilt it as a summer residence, reconstructing the manor house, adding an L-shaped farm range and, under his successor Benedikt, a Baroque portal.

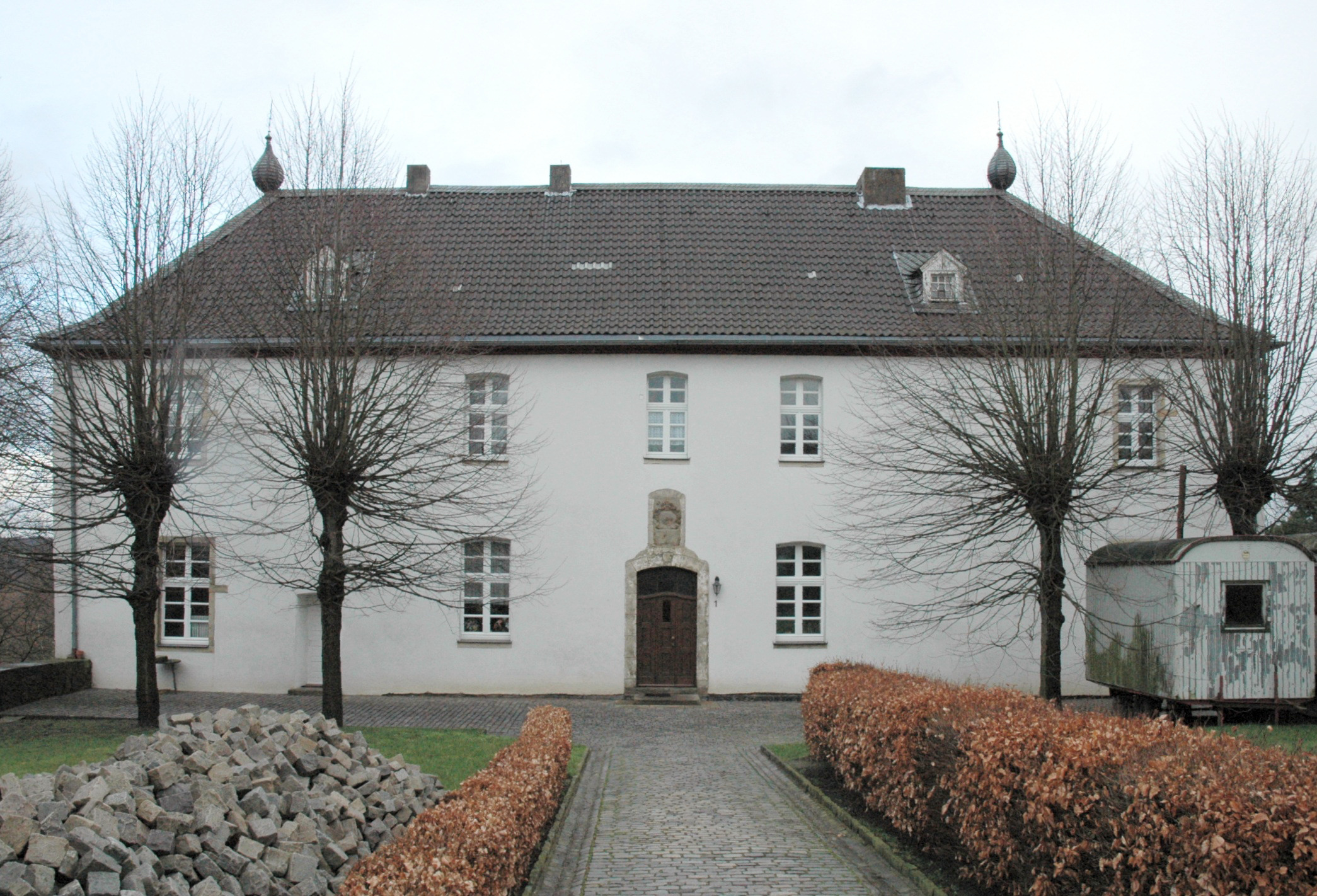
The manor house

Through secularization the estate passed to France in 1803 and, by the Congress of Vienna, to Prussia in 1815. Prussia sold it in 1842 to a mining company, and on 2 July 1890 the Heisingen merchant Johann Sonnenschein acquired it; his family remains the owner today.

== See also ==
- Staël von Holstein
- Staël von Holstein family residences
- Werden Abbey
