= Lindlarer Sülz =

River in Germany

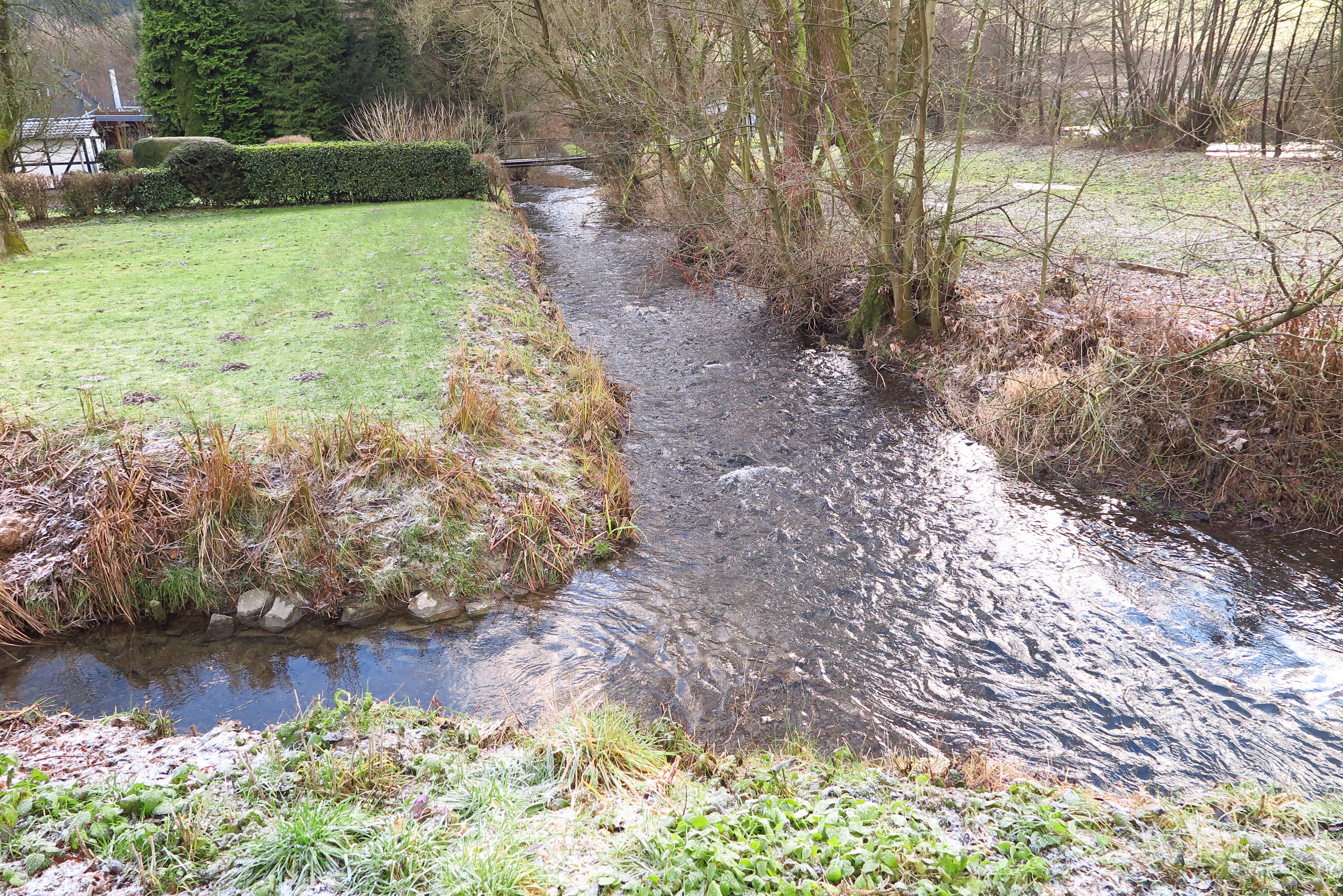
- Lindlarer Sülz near Hartegasse

Location
- Country: Germany
- State: North Rhine-Westphalia

Physical characteristics
- Source
  - location: Near Obersiemeringhausen
  - coordinates: 51°5′4.9″N 7°30′4.9″E
  - elevation: 387 m (1,270 ft)
- Mouth
  - location: Sülz
  - coordinates: 51.0075°N 7.2826°E
  - elevation: 128 m (420 ft)
- Length: 23.8 km (14.8 mi)

Basin features
- Progression: Sülz→ Agger→ Sieg→ Rhine→ North Sea

Lindlarer Sülz is a river of North Rhine-Westphalia, Germany. The Sülz is formed by the confluence of the Kürtener Sülz with the Lindlarer Sülz in Lindlar-Hommerich. .

== See also ==
- List of rivers of North Rhine-Westphalia
