= Kürtener Sülz =

River in Germany

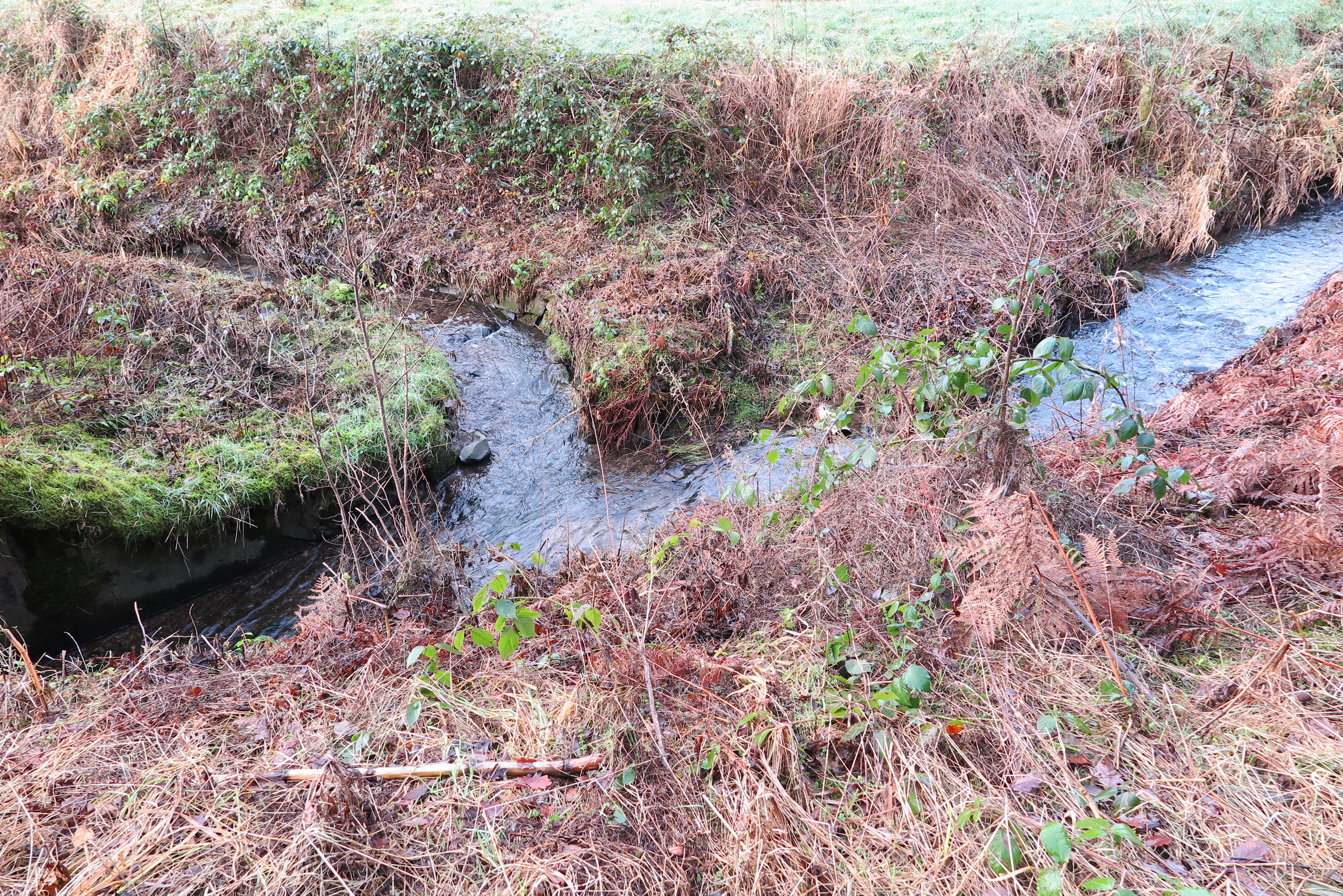

Location
- Country: Germany
- State: North Rhine-Westphalia

Physical characteristics
- Mouth
  - location: Sülz
  - coordinates: 51.0075°N 7.2826°E
- Length: 20.4 km (12.7 mi)

Basin features
- Progression: Sülz→ Agger→ Sieg→ Rhine→ North Sea

Kürtener Sülz is a river of North Rhine-Westphalia, Germany. The Sülz is formed by the confluence of the Kürtener Sülz with the Lindlarer Sülz in Lindlar-Hommerich.

== See also ==
- List of rivers of North Rhine-Westphalia
