= Kodasoo =

Village in Estonia

Coordinates: 59°27′N 25°16′E

- Village
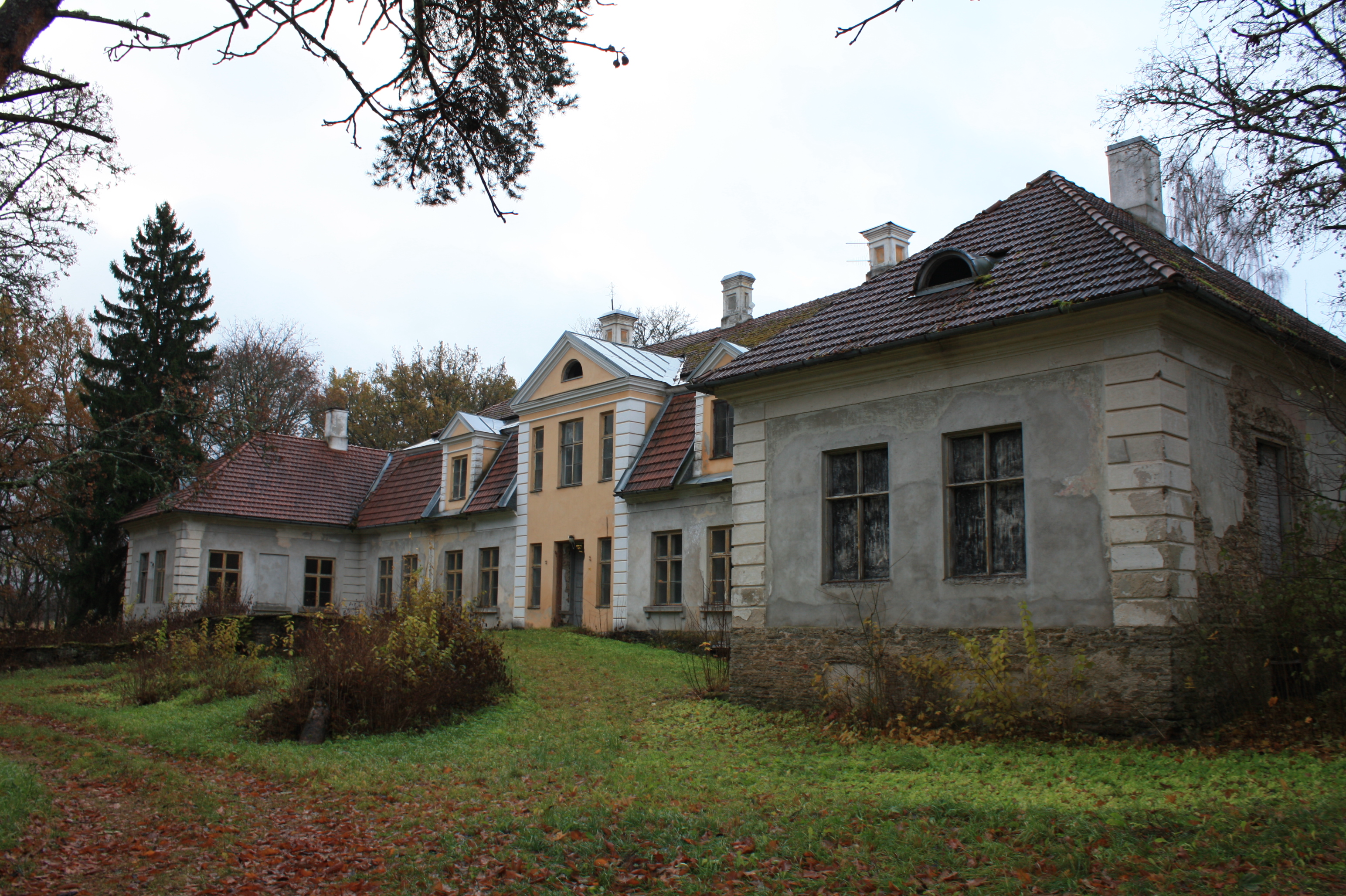
- Kodasoo Manor
- Interactive map of Kodasoo
- Country: Estonia
- County: Harju County
- Parish: Kuusalu Parish
- Time zone: UTC+2 (EET)
  - Summer (DST): UTC+3 (EEST)

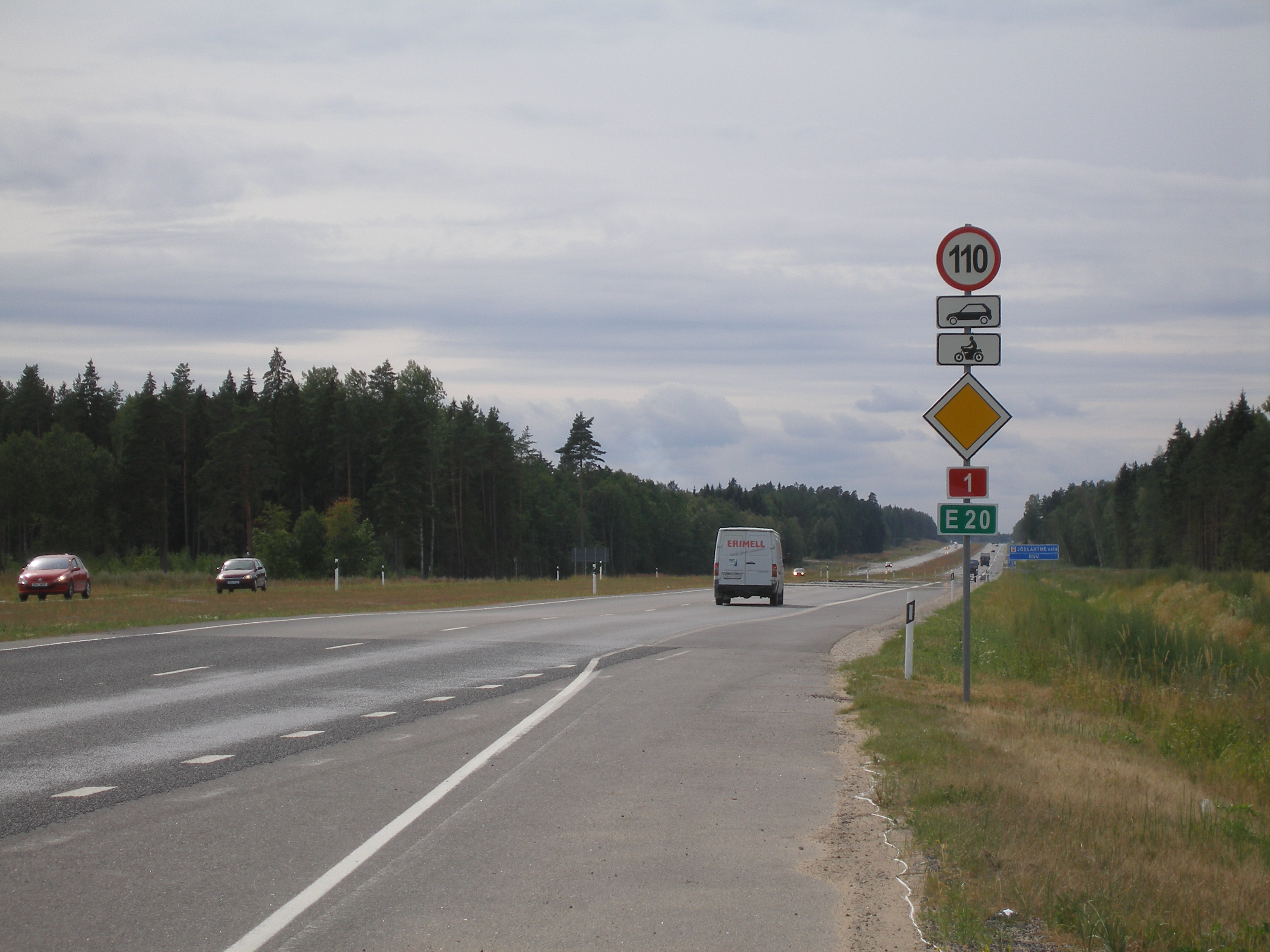
Tallinn–Narva road (part of European route E20) on the territory of Kodasoo village

Kodasoo is a village in Kuusalu Parish, Harju County in northern Estonia.
