= Ravila =

Borough in Estonia

- Small borough
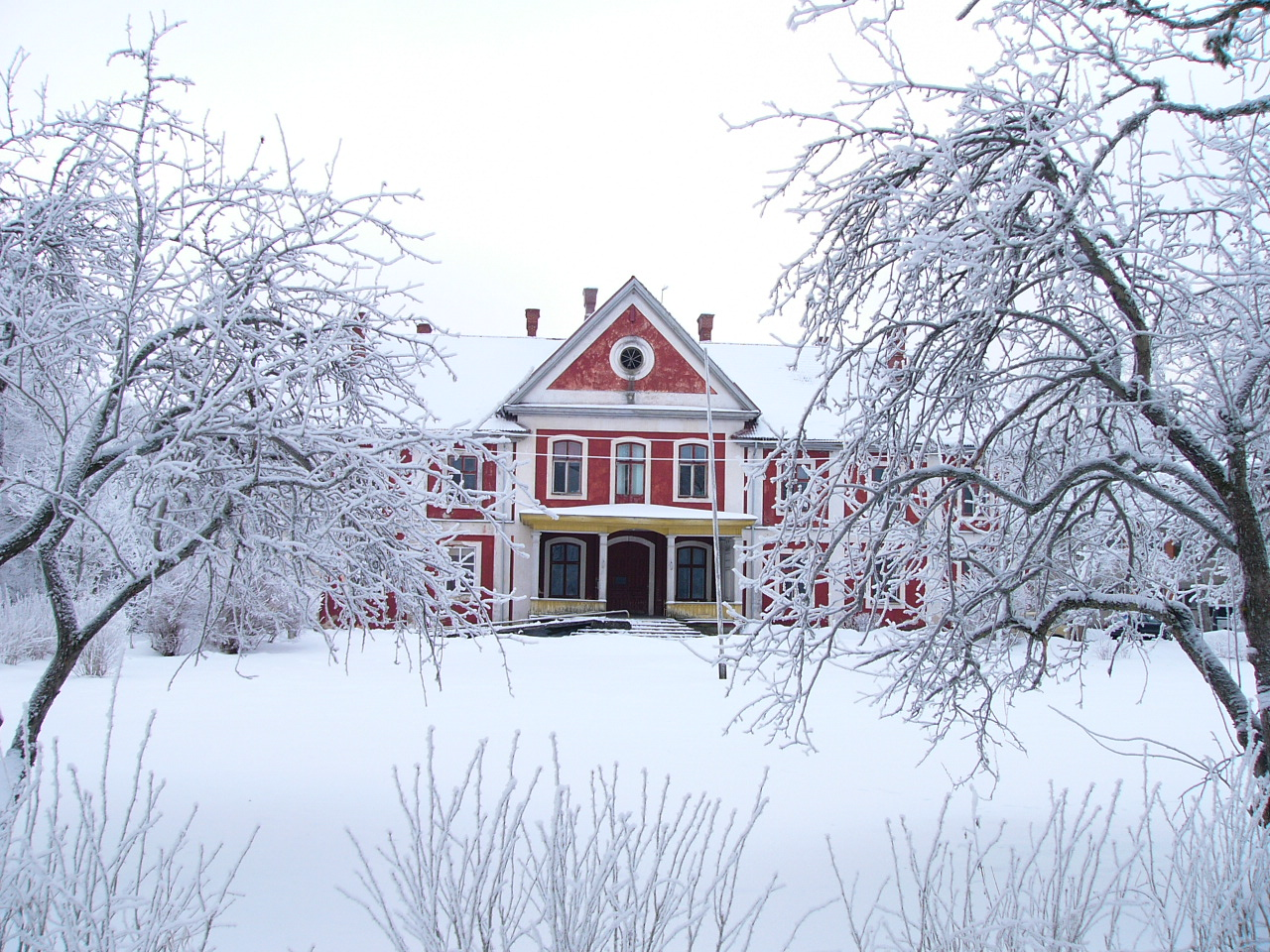
- Ravila Manor

- Location in Estonia
- Coordinates: 59°11′06″N 25°13′22″E
- Country: Estonia
- County: Harju County
- Municipality: Kose Parish

Ravila (German: Meks) is a small borough (alevik) in Kose Parish, Harju County in northern Estonia.

== Ravila Manor ==
Ravila was first referred to as the location of a manor in 1469. A later baroque building was burned down during the Revolution of 1905, and only the grand granite stairs facing the park survives from that building. It was rebuilt shortly afterwards, but smaller and in a Baroque Revival architecture|neo-Baroque style. It was the home of writer Peter August Friedrich von Manteuffel. In the late 1800s Ravila Manor was managed by Alexander Otto Lesthal who lived in the adjacent Governor's House. Estonian photographer Arthur Lesthal was born in the Governor's House as well as his brother, Eesti Lloyd insurance director Paul Lesthal.
