= Sutthausen =

District of Osnabrück, Germany

Coordinates: 52.2361°N 8.0272°E

Sutthausen is a district of Osnabrück, Germany, with a population of about 4,500 residents. It is located in the south of the city, close to the Teutoburg Forest; it originally arose from two separate estates, Gut Sutthausen and Gut Wulften. The district has both Protestant and Catholic churches - respectively the Apostelkirche and the Marienkirche.

== History ==
Until it was incorporated into the city of Osnabrück on 7 March 1970, Sutthausen was part of the municipality of Holzhausen. The area of Alt-Holzhausen is today part of Georgsmarienhütte.

=== Gut Sutthausen ===
Gut Sutthausen was first mentioned in records in 1282. At that time it was owned by local squire Johann von Sutthausen; the name referred to its origins in the south of Osnabrück. The waters of the Düte – a small nearby river – were used to supply the castle moat. Over the centuries the castle had a multitude of different owners and in 1935 came into the possession of the Thuiner sisters of the Franciscan order. They set up the Berufsfachschule am Marienheim (Marienheim Training College), whose main subject areas were housekeeping, childcare, social care and social assistance.

Other features of the property include the castle chapel (built in 1893) and the mill, which dates from the year 1589. The site is surrounded by an extensive park with ponds and a small zoo for indigenous animals.

=== Gut Wulften ===
The first appearance of the Gut Wulften in records was in 1147, at which time it was most likely the seat of the family Wulvena. It also changed hands regularly, before being bought by the city council of Osnabrück in 1929. A single-class Catholic school was based here until 1936. The castle was severely damaged during World War II and left derelict for a while before being rebuilt and renovated by the merchant Emil Krone in 1962. The building is today home to 20 apartments and a shop selling English antiques.

=== Wulfter Turm ===
The Wulfter Turm (Wulfter Tower) was built around 1300 during the formation of the city's territorial army. It is the last surviving tower of its kind. Some of the walls and trenches from this period can still be seen around the area surrounding the tower.

== Transportation ==
The Osnabrück-Sutthausen railway station lies on the Osnabrück-Bielefeld line, on which the “Haller Willem” (RB 75) regional train provides an hourly service. A city bus route connects Sutthausen to Osnabrück city centre. Regional rail transport is provided by NordWestBahn using Bombardier’s diesel “Talent” railcars.

In addition Sutthausen is also the location of a motorway junction, leading onto Bundesautobahn 30 and European route E30.

== Works ==
- Geschichten aus Sutthausen – Chronik eines Stadtteils (published by Geschichtswerkstatt Sutthausen/Historical Workshop Sutthausen)
- Von Bruch, R., Die Rittersitze des Fürstentums Osnabrück (2nd republished edition, Osnabrück, 1982)
- Steinwascher, G. (ed), Geschichte der Stadt Osnabrück (Belm nr. Osnabrück, 2006)
- Von Wällen und Gräben (published by Stadt Osnabrück/Osnabrück city council, 1999)

== Links ==
- Vierteljährliche Informationen des Referates Stadtentwicklung und Bürgerbeteiligung, Bereich Statistik, 4/2008 (PDF file, 1,49 MB)
- Stadt Osnabrück, Referat für Stadtentwicklung und Bürgerbeteiligung -Statistik-, 11/2009 (PDF file, 35,40 KB)
