= Taali (village) =

Village in Estonia

Coordinates: 58°27′N 24°47′E

- Village
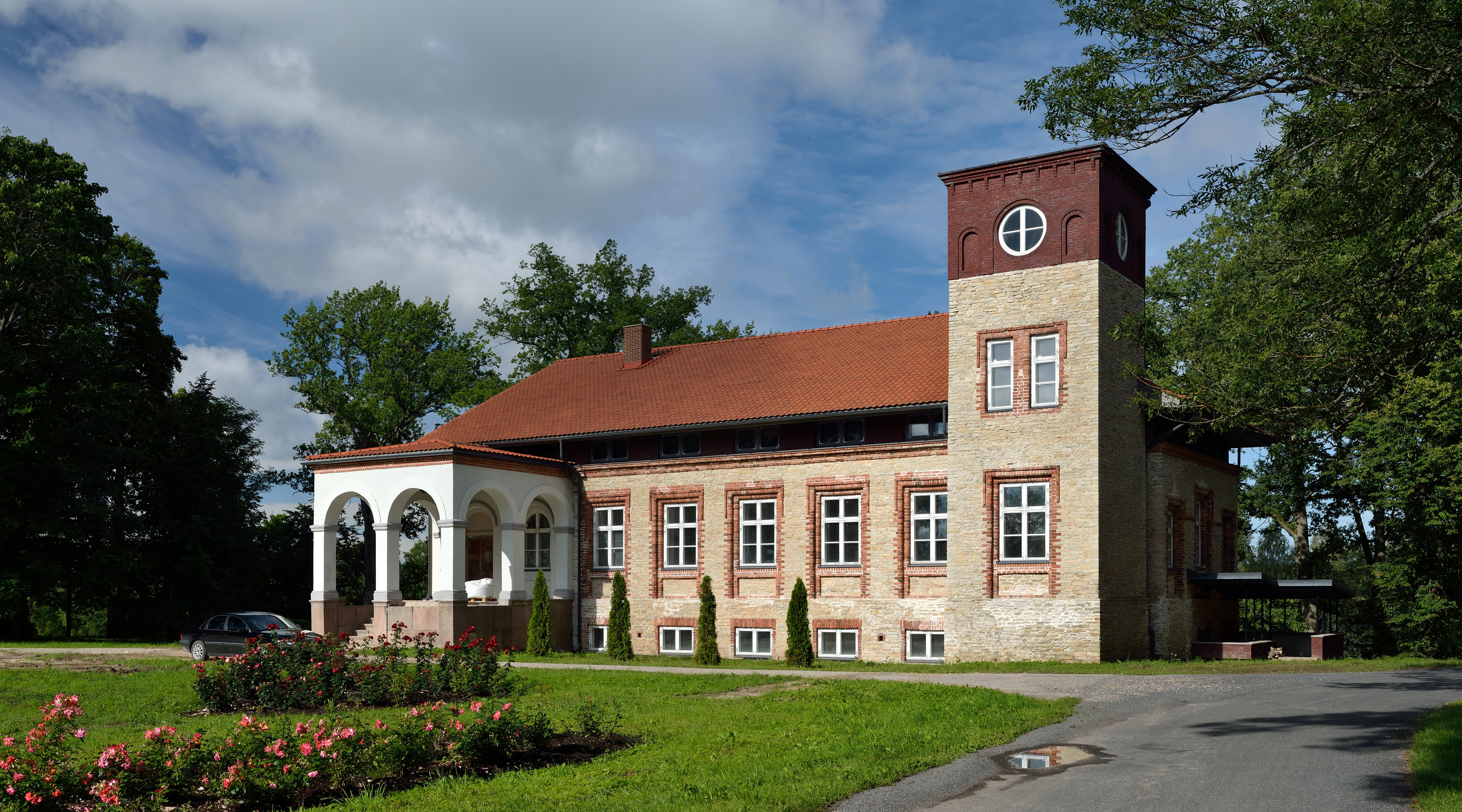
- Taali manor
- Interactive map of Taali
- Country: Estonia
- County: Pärnu County
- Parish: Tori Parish
- Time zone: UTC+2 (EET)
  - Summer (DST): UTC+3 (EEST)

Taali is a village in Tori Parish, Pärnu County in southwestern Estonia.

== Taali manor ==
Taali manor derives its name (German: Staelenhof) from the family Staël von Holstein, who received the estate as a gift in the 17th century and who were the owners until the Estonian land reform of 1919. The present-day limestone building, in neo-Renaissance style, was built in 1852 but heavily damaged during World War II. Today only about one third of the original building remains.
