= Sülz (river) =

River in Germany

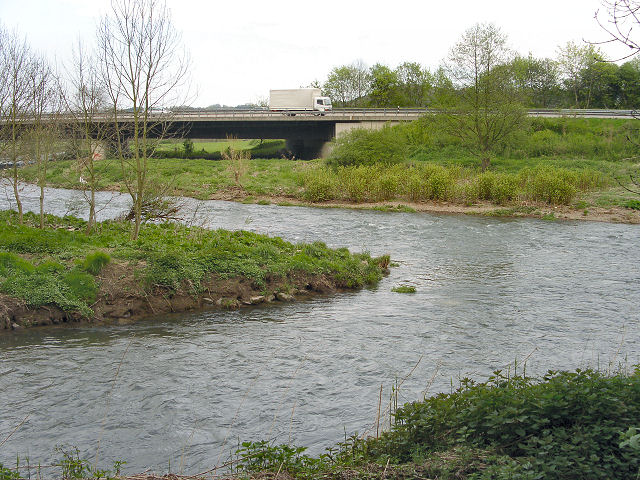

Location
- Country: Germany
- State: North Rhine-Westphalia

Physical characteristics
- Mouth
  - location: Agger
  - coordinates: 50.8519°N 7.2137°E
- Length: 48.7 km (30.3 mi)
- Basin size: 245 km^{2} (95 sq mi)

Basin features
- Progression: Agger→ Sieg→ Rhine→ North Sea
- Tributaries
  - left: Lindlarer Sülz
  - right: Kürtener Sülz

Sülz (German pronunciation: [zʏlts]) is a river of North Rhine-Westphalia, Germany. It flows into the Agger near Lohmar. Its total length is 48.7 km, including its main source river Lindlarer Sülz.

== See also ==
- List of rivers of North Rhine-Westphalia
