= Swedish nobility =

Socially privileged class in Sweden

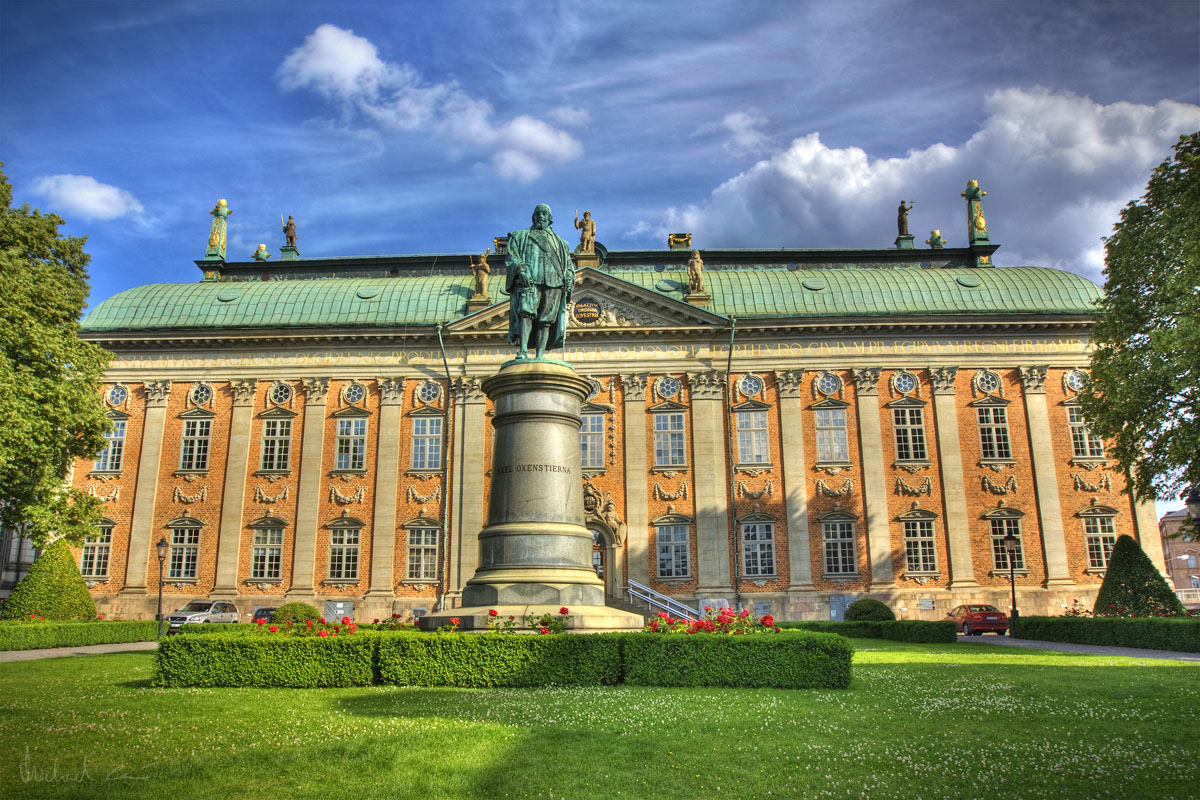
The Swedish House of Nobility in Stockholm, Sweden.

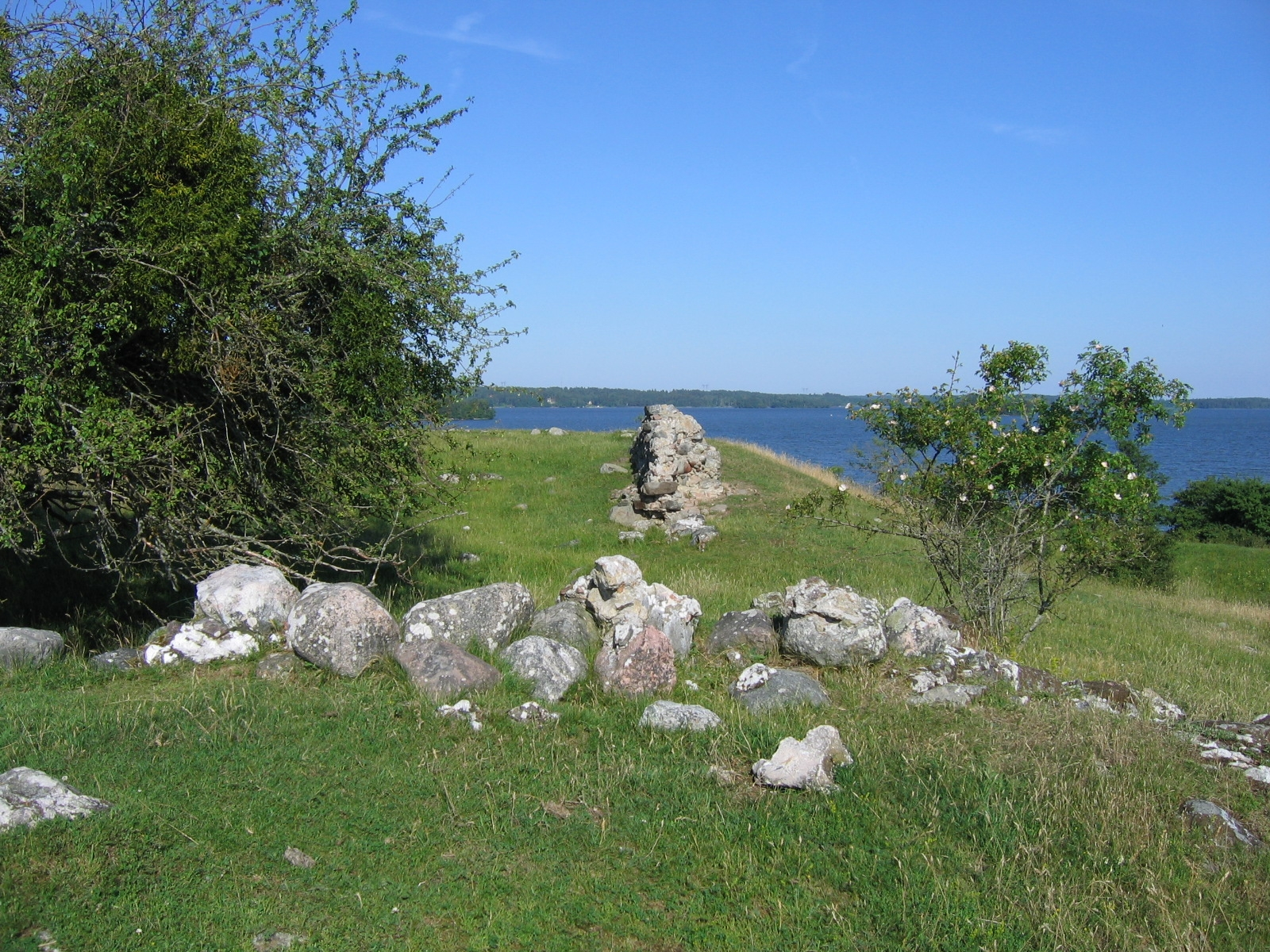
Ruins of Alsnö Castle, where the first known ordinance of Swedish nobility was given in 1280 by King Magnus Ladulås.

The Swedish nobility (Swedish: Adeln, or Ridderskapet och Adeln, lit. "The Knights and the Nobility") has historically been a legally or socially privileged class in Sweden, and part of the so-called frälse (a derivation from Old Swedish meaning free neck). The archaic term for nobility, frälse, also included the clergy, a classification defined by tax exemptions and representation in the diet (the Riksdag). Today the nobility does not maintain its former legal privileges although family names, titles and coats of arms are still protected. The Swedish nobility consists of both "introduced" and "unintroduced" nobility, where the latter has not been formally "introduced" at the House of Nobility (Riddarhuset). The House of Nobility still maintains a fee for male members over the age of 18 for upkeep on pertinent buildings in Stockholm.

Belonging to the nobility in present-day Sweden may still carry some informal social privileges, and be of certain social and historical significance particularly among some groups. Sweden has, however, long been a modern democratic society and meritocratic practices are supposed to govern all appointments to state offices by law. No special privileges, in taxation or otherwise, are therefore given to any Swedish citizen based on family origins, the exceptions being the monarch and other members of the royal family.

In 1902, Sven Hedin became the last person, other than members of the royal family, to be ennobled in Sweden. The 1974 Instrument of Government ended the monarch's right to ennoble; no new people can therefore be ennobled in Sweden. As of 2004 there were about 619 existing noble families in Sweden, with about 28,000 members. They are classified as counts (46 families), barons (124 families) and untitled nobility (449 families).

Until 2003 the nobility was regulated by a government statute, but in that year the statute was lifted so that governmental sanction and legal regulation of the nobility was discontinued. The House of Nobility is now a private institution, run as any private corporation under civil commercial law, and is owned by its members. Today, the only privilege of the nobility is the right to use a helm with an open visor in their coats of arms, this according to a 1762 royal act; commoners using open visors or "noblemen's shield" (Adelig Sköld) are subjected to a fine. When an association called Ofrälse och löske mäns samfund för bruk af öppne hjälmar (Commoners' and vagabonds' society for the use of open visors) petitioned the Swedish government for amnesty (Swedish: abolition) in regards to violations of the 1762 act, the petition was not tried nor granted. The Supreme Administrative Court of Sweden ruled, in 2013, that, since no one has the right to amnesty, the government's decision did not concern anyone's civil rights according to the European Convention on Human Rights, and could thus not be examined by the court.

== Organization ==
Swedish nobility is organized into three classes according to a scheme introduced in riddarhusordningen (Standing orders of the House of Knights) 1626

- the Class of Lords (Swedish: Herreklassen), comprising counts (greve) and barons (friherre, baron), two titles introduced in 1561 by Erik XIV;
- the Class of Knights (Swedish: Riddarklassen), untitled descendants of Swedish Privy Councillors and since 1778 the 300 oldest families in the Class of Esquire as well as the "commander families", who are of the descendants of commanders of Swedish royal orders;
- the Class of Esquires (Swedish: Svenneklassen), other untitled nobles.

The two last classes contains the so-called untitled nobility (Swedish: obetitlad adel). The division into classes has roots in the Middle Ages when the nobility frälse was divided into lords in the Privy Council, knights and esquires. Until 1719 the three classes voted separately, but in the Age of Liberty all classes were voting together with one vote for each family head (Swedish: huvudman). This made the vast majority of the untitled nobility in power, for example officers and civil servants were represented.

In 1778 Gustav III restored the classes and class voting and at the same time he reformed the Class of Knights. Originally this class only contained family descendants of Privy Councillors and was the smallest class of the three classes. But Gustav III also introduced in this class the 300 oldest families in the Class of Esquire and also the "commander families", who are of the descendants of commanders of the Order of the North Star and the Order of the Sword. No more commander families were introduced in the House of Knights after 1809, and thereafter also the class voting was abolished and the nobility was then voting as during the Age of Liberty.

A Swedish duke (hertig) has almost always been of royal status and counted as such. The exception in medieval times was Bengt Algotsson. Two men were also created princes (furstar) in the 18th century: Fredrik Vilhelm von Hessenstein and Wilhelm Malte zu Putbus but neither were introduced.

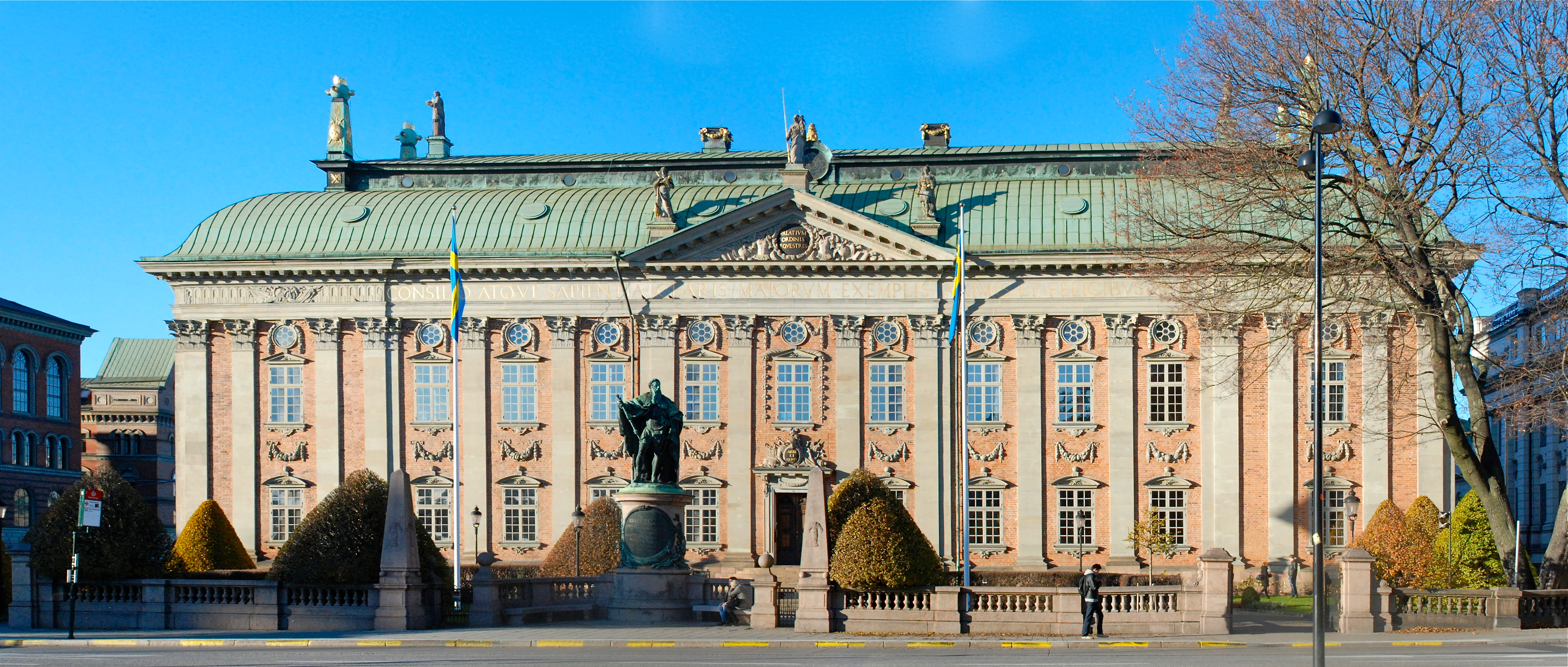
The House of Nobility (Riddarhuset) in Stockholm

Following the elevation of a commoner into nobility by the Swedish monarch, the new nobleman had to seek introduction in order to be a fully recognised member of the House of Nobility (Riddarhuset), a term that also refers to its function as a chamber in the Riksdag of the Estates, the Swedish Parliament. In 1866 the Nobility was formally separated from government and incorporated as a separate institution, governed by statutes handed down by the monarch (from 1975: the government). This last link to the government and state was abolished in 2003. The Palace of the Nobility served as official representation for the nobility and was regulated by the Swedish government, but this regulation ceased completely in 2003, as have the privileges. The membership roster is published every three years.

== Medieval nobility: Frälse ==
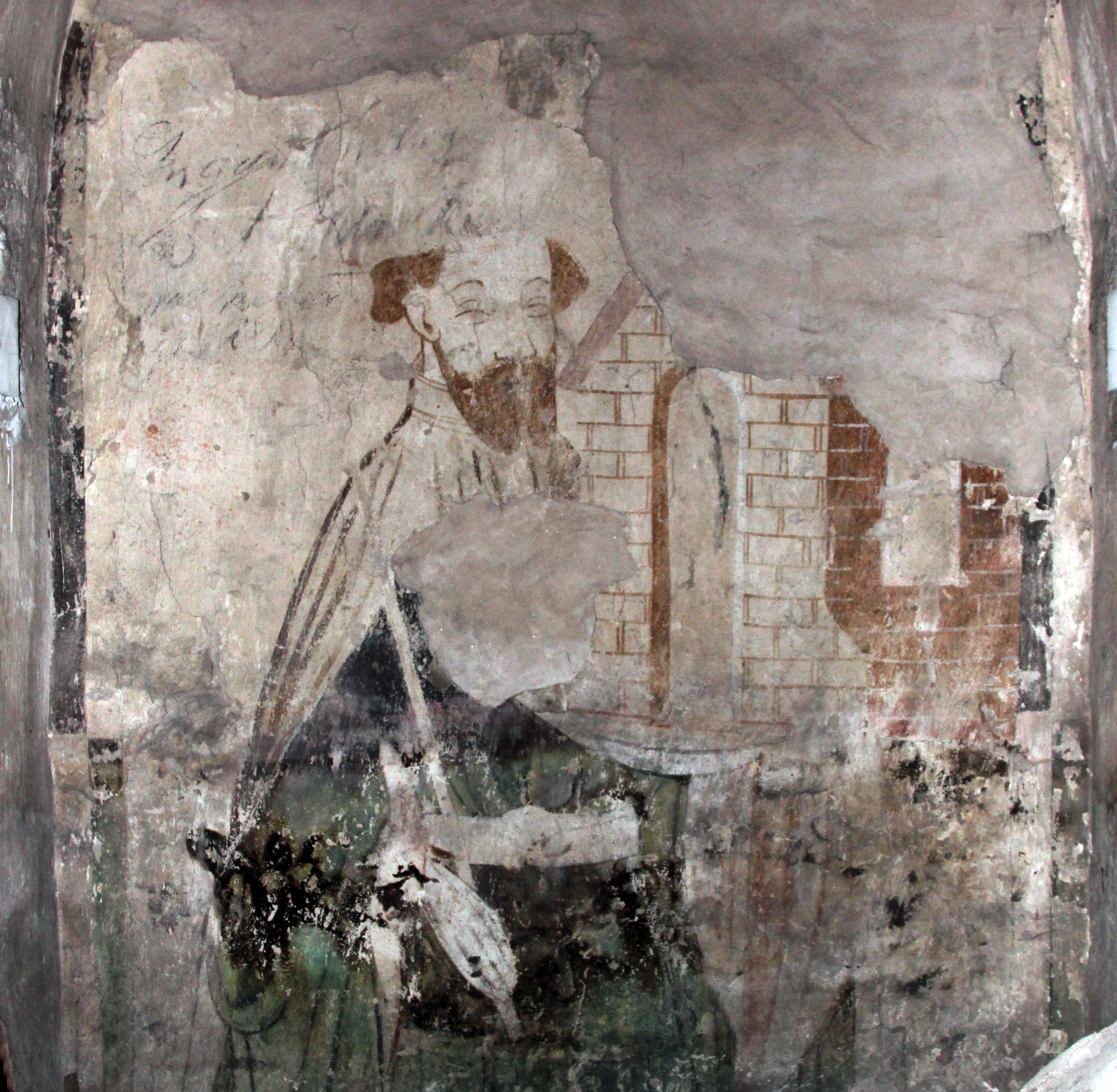
King Magnus Ladulås

The institution of Swedish (and Finnish) nobility dates back to 1280, when it was stated by King Magnus Ladulås in the Decree of Alsnö that magnates who could afford to contribute a mounted soldier to the cavalry were to be exempted from tax - at least from ordinary taxes - just as the clergy already had been. The archaic Swedish term for nobility, frälse, also included the clergy with respect to their exemption from tax. Generally, the nobility grew from wealthier or more powerful members of the peasantry, those who were capable of assigning work or wealth to provide the requisite cavalrymen. These became knights, councilors and castle commanders.

The background for this was that the old system of a leiðangr fleet and a king constantly on travel through the realm (between the estates of Uppsala öd) had by this time become outmoded. The crown's court and castles were now to be financed through taxes on land.

Soon it was agreed that the king should govern the realm in cooperation with a Privy Council (or Royal Council), in which the bishops and the most distinguished magnates (i.e. the most prominent contributors to the army) participated. When critical decisions were necessary, the whole frälse was summoned to the diets.

Swedish nobility had no hereditary fiefs. In the case where a noble was granted a castle belonging to the crown, his heirs couldn't later claim their ancestors' civil or military rights. The lands of the magnates who constituted the medieval nobility were their own and not "on lease" from a feudal king. If they by their own means or exploitation of peasants built a castle and financed troops, then the castle was theirs, but the troops were expected to serve as a part of the army of the realm. In Sweden, there never existed serfdom. Hence, nobility was basically a class of well-off citizens, not owners of other human beings. In the Middle Ages and much of the modern age, nobles and other wealthy men were landowners, as well as lords of peasants and servants. Members of the nobility utilized their economic power and sometimes also other powers to have small-farm owners sell their lands to manor lords, so landowning centralized gradually more in the hands of the noble class.

For extended periods, the commander of Viborg at the Novgorod/Russian front did, in practice, function as a margrave, keeping all the crown's income from the fief to use for the defense of the realm's eastern border. But despite heavy German influence during the medieval period, the elaborate German system with titles such as Lantgraf, Reichsgraf, Burggraf and Pfalzgraf was never applied in Sweden.

== Ancient nobility ==
Swedish ancient nobility (Swedish: uradel) is the term used for families whose de facto status as nobility was formalised by the Ordinance of Alsnö in 1280.

These noble families have no original patents of nobility, the first known being from 1360. The somewhat loose cut-off date or rather rule of thumb for what constitutes ancient Swedish nobility is therefore set to during mid 14th century but no later than 1400.

Some Swedish ancient families are still extant at the Swedish House of Nobility or the Finnish House of Nobility; some have been further elevated from Class of Esquires to Class of Knights or to titled nobility (count or baron). In 1778 all ancient noble families in the Class of Esquires were elevated to the Class of Knights.

Some ancient noble families:

- Aspenäs
- Banér
- Bese
- Bielke (extant, Sweden's second oldest noble family)
- Björn
- Bååt
- Bonde (extant)
- Carpelan (extant)
- Eka
- Hiort af Ornäs (extant)
- Hård af Segerstad (extant)
- Jägerhorn af Spurila (extant)
- Leijonhufvud (extant)
- Lilliehöök (extant)
- Natt och Dag (extant, Sweden's oldest noble family)
- Oxenstierna (extant)
- Porse
- Posse (extant)
- Ribbing (extant)
- Rosenstråle
- Sparre (extant)
- Stenbock (extant)
- Trolle (extant)
- Ulfsparre
- Örnsparre

== Nobility after 1561 ==
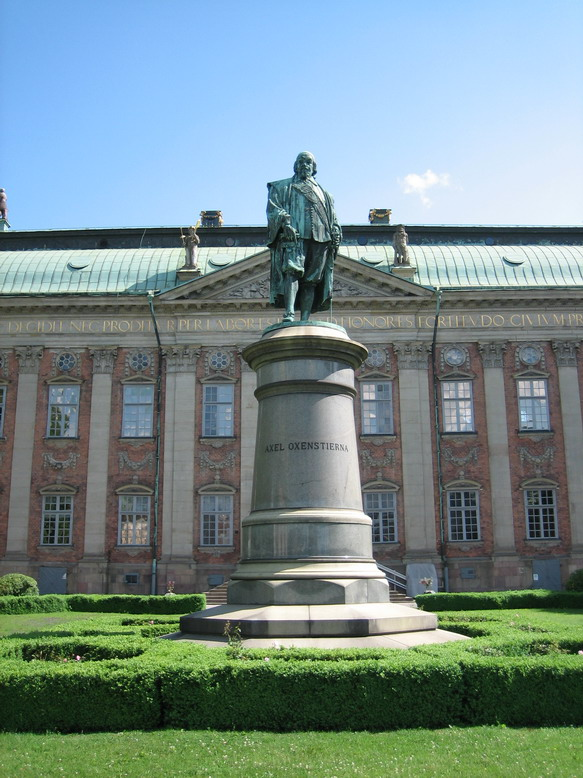
Axel Oxenstierna secured all government appointments to be filled by nobles.

At the coronation of Eric XIV in 1561, Swedish nobility became formally hereditary for the first time upon the creation of the higher titles of Count (greve) and Baron (friherre). The House of Knights was organized in 1626. The grounds for introduction into this chamber became either birth into an "ancient" noble family or ennoblement by the sovereign. Consequently, genealogy flourished.

The Lord High Chancellor, Axel Oxenstierna, was the architect of the Instrument of Government of 1634, which laid the foundation of modern Sweden. It guaranteed that all government appointments were to be filled by candidates from the nobility, a move which helped mobilize support for, rather than opposition to, a centralized national government.

Due to the many wars fought by Sweden, the crown needed some means of rewarding its officers, and since the royal coffers were not without end, ennoblement and grants of land were useful substitutes for cash payments. During the 17th century, the number of noble families grew by a factor of five. In less than a century, the nobility's share of Swedish land ownership rose from 16% to over 60%, which led to considerably lower tax revenue for the crown. The "Reduction" of 1655 and 1680, however, brought land back into the crown's possession.

Historically all members of a noble family were generally titled. If the family was of the rank of a Count or a Baron, all members received that title as well. However, following the new Instrument of Government from 1809, a change was made more in line with the British system so that, for later nobility, only the head of the family would hold the title (if there is one). There are a few families where these systems overlap such that the vast majority are nobles pre-1809 without title, while the heads of the families have been elevated to count or baron after 1809. The vast majority of noble families are still of the old kind where all members are regarded as nobles.

No hereditary title of nobility has been granted since 1902, when explorer Sven Hedin was ennobled by the King (that honor was hereditary, but he left no heirs). Since 1975 the Swedish monarch and government no longer have the right to ennoble or to confer knighthoods and orders on Swedes. Titles are still given to members of the Swedish royal house where princes and princesses are made non-hereditary dukes or duchesses of selected provinces, but these are honorary titles within that house, not titles of nobility.

== Unintroduced nobility ==
Unintroduced families could use their titles, if they had any, and noble elements and styles in their coats of arms. There has never been legislation in Sweden preventing anyone from purporting to belong to nobility. The recognition of such noble status in society was of a social, not a legal, nature, as has all Swedish nobility become since it was separated from the government more recently.

Sweden has had a significant number of unintroduced noble families (as of 2010 comprising 99 living families and around 450 individuals), several of which have been historically prominent. The families fall into four groups:

1. Foreign nobility, being families of foreign origin (most commonly Baltic German) which had noble status in a different country than Sweden, and which partially or wholly live in Sweden. This group is the largest.
2. Families of Swedish origin which were granted noble status and/or titles by a foreign country (for example, members of the royal House of Bernadotte have been granted Belgian and Luxembourgish princely and comital titles).
3. Families which have been ennobled by the Swedish monarch, but which have not been introduced at the House of Nobility. This group is small.
4. Armigerous families of foreign origin which have traditionally been included in the various directories of unintroduced nobility, but whose original noble status has not been proven. They are included in Swedish unintroduced nobility for traditional reasons, such as having been considered noble in Sweden for an extended period of time. This group is also small.

Three successive almanach series of unintroduced nobility have been published; the first in 1886, the second in 1912, and the third in 1935; it came out most recently in 2010. An association of unintroduced nobility, Sveriges Ointroducerade Adels Förening, private club with no official standing, was founded in 1911. Several branches of the House of Bernadotte have chosen to become members of this association, as a result of members of the royal family being denied the use of Swedish titles upon marrying non-royals, but being granted foreign (Luxembourgish or Belgian) titles. Carl Johan Bernadotte was chairman of the association for many years.

== Titles of high nobility ==
=== Introduced ===
According to the Nordisk Familjebok: The first counts and barons, created in 1561 by Eric XIV were:

- Svante Sture of Hörningsholm, 1562 count of Vestervik and later also Stegeholm
- Peder Joakimsson Brahe of Rydboholm, 1562 count of Visingsborg
- Göstaff Johansson of Haga, 1562 count of Bogesund (originally Enköping)
- Stenbock Gustaf Olofsson, baron of Torpa
- Leijonhufvud Sten Eriksson, baron of Grevsnes
- Grip Birger Nilsson, baron of Vines
- Oxenstierna Gabriel Kristersson, baron of Mörby
- Lars Fleming, baron of Arvasalo (in Finland)
- Gera Karl Holgersson, baron of Björkvik
- Gera Göran Holgersson, baron of Ållonö
- Horn af Åminne Klas Kristersson, baron of Joensuu (in Finland)
- Stenbock Erik Gustafsson, baron of Torpa (younger son of Gustaf Olofsson)

John III granted the first baronial titles accompanied by territorial grants (earlier titles elevated the family's hereditary estate to comital or baronial status):

- Öresten and Kronobäck to Erik Gustafsson of Torpa
- Lundholm to Nils Göransson Gyllenstierna, new baron
- Viikki (in Finland) to Klas Eriksson Fleming, new baron
- Läckö to Hogenskild Bielke, new baron
- Ekholmen to Pontus De la Gardie, new baron
- Kungs-Lena to Olof Gustafsson Stenbock (elder son and heir of Gustaf Olofsson)
- county of Raseborg (in Finland) to baron Sten Eriksson of Grevsnes' widow Countess Ebba Lilliehöök and heirs in 1571

Charles IX created only one:

- barony of Nynäs (in Finland) to Abraham Leijonhufvud

(he made Svante Bielke and Nils Bielke barons without grant of entailed lands)

Gustav II Adolf granted:

- county of Läckö to Jacob De la Gardie
- county of Pärnu (in northern Livonia, now Estonia) to Franz Bernhard von Thurn (son of Jindřich Matyáš Thurn)
- barony of Kimito (in Finland) to Axel Oxenstierna
- barony of Bergkvara to Carl Carlsson Gyllenhielm
- barony of Tuutarhovi (in Ingria) to Johan Skytte
- barony of Orreholm to Jakob Vilhelmsson Spens

Christina granted:

- county of Södermöre to Axel Oxenstierna
- county of Vasaborg (in Finland) to Gustav Gustavsson, her illegitimate half-brother
- county of Ortala to Lennart Torstenson
- county of Kuressaare (later exchanged for Pärnu) to Magnus Gabriel De la Gardie
- county of Sortavala (in Finland) to Johan Adam Banér
- county of Björneborg (Pori) (in Finland) to Gustav Horn
- county of Vestervik and Stegeholm to Hans Kristofer von Königsmark
- county of Korsholm and Vasa (in Finland) to Gabriel Bengtsson Oxenstierna
- county of Bogesund to Fredrik Stenbock
- county of Salmi and Suistamo pogosta (in Finland) to Carl Gustaf Wrangel
- county of Kruunupori (in Finland) to Ture Oxenstierna
- county of Nyborg (in Finland) to Arvid Wittenberg
- county of Karleborg (in Finland) to Klas Tott
- county of Liljenborg to Axel Lillie
- county of Mariestad to Lars Kagg
- county of Skeninge to Robert Douglas
- county of Skövde to Kristofer Karl von Schlippenbach
- county of Enköping to Antonius von Steinberg
- barony of Vibyholm to Gustav Gustavsson, her illegitimate half-brother
- barony of Virestad to Lennart Torstensson
- barony of Kronoberg to Peder Sparre
- barony of Korpo (in Finland) to Nils Bielke
- barony of Härlunda to Seved Bååt
- barony of Kajaani (in Finland) to Per Brahe
- barony of Örneholma (in Finland) to Johan Adler-Salvius
- barony of Liperi (in Finland) pogosta to Hermann Fleming
- barony of Oulu (in Finland) to Erik Gyllenstierna
- barony of Kitee (in Finland) pogosta to Axel Lillie
- barony of Loimijoki (in Finland) to Arvid Wittenberg
- barony of Limingo (in Finland) to Matias Soop
- barony of Marienburg to Gustav Horn af Marienborg and certain of his relatives
- barony of Vöyripori (in Finland) to Carl Gustaf Paijkull
- barony of Tohmajärvi (in Finland) pogosta to Lars Kagg
- barony of Kokkola (in Finland) to Gustav Banér
- barony of Sund to Erik Ryning
- barony of Laihia (in Finland) to Karl Bonde
- barony of Pyhäjoki (in Finland) to Klas Hansson Bjelkenstjerna
- barony of Iijoki (in Finland) to Åke Axelsson Tott
- barony of Ikalapori (in Finland) to Schering Rosenhane
- barony of Hailuoto (in Finland) to Bernt Taube
- barony of Hedensund (then Arnäs) to Knut Posse
- barony of Vinberg to Gustaf Adolf Leijonhudvud
- barony of Lindeberg to Carl Gustav Wrangel and his brothers
- barony of Lindeborg to Lorentz von der Linde
- barony of Willenbruch and Harzefeld to Pierre Bidal
- barony of Ludenhof (Luua, now in Palamuse Parish, Estonia) to Hans Wrangel
- barony of Eksjö to Reinhold Lieven
- barony of Elfkarleby to Mårten Leijonhufvud
- barony of Gudhem to Lauri Cruus
- baron of Skälby to Robert Douglas
- barony of Koivisto (in Finland) to Hans Wachtmeister
- barony of Lempäälä (in Finland) to Johan Kurck
- barony of Wetter-Rosenthal to Adolf Friedrich Wetter,
- barony of Närpes (in Finland) to Jakob and Anders Lilliehöök,
- barony of Elimäki (in Finland) to Kasper and Karl Henrik Wrede af Elimä,
- barony of Lais to Erik Fleming,

Charles X Gustav granted:

- county of Sölvesborg to Corfitz Ulfeldt
  - (Lars Kagg, then Carl Gustav Wrangel, obtained the county of Sölvesborg in exchanges)
- baron of Örneholma (in Finland) to P. Wuertz
- barony of Kastell Ladugården to Rutger von Ascheberg

Charles XI granted:

- county of Börringe and Lindholm to Gustaf Carlson, his out-of-wedlock half-brother

=== Unintroduced ===
The following titled families of high nobility are included in Kalender öfver i Sverige lefvande ointroducerad adel (1886–1899), Sveriges ointroducerade adels kalender (1912–1944), and/or Kalender över Ointroducerad adels förening (1935–), which are directories of the living (at the time of publication) unintroduced noble families resident in Sweden. Five of these families have titles as Princes, Dukes or Marquis, the others as Counts and Barons. Most unintroduced noble families, however, are untitled, similar to the introduced families. Some of these families, or their titled branches, have since become extinct.

Princes

- Bernadotte (Belgian princely title awarded to Prince Carl Bernadotte)
- Cantacuzino (Romanian princely family)
- Putbus (Created princes by king Gustav IV Adolf, Duke of Swedish Pomerania, in 1807, not included in the calendar)

Dukes

- D'Otrante (Napoleonic nobility)

Marquis

- Joussineau de Tourdonnet (French nobility)
- Lagergren (Papal/Italian nobility)

Counts

- Bernadotte of Wisborg (Luxembourgish title awarded to various members of the House of Bernadotte)
- Crapon de Caprona
- Fouché d'Otrante (Napoleonic nobility)
- von der Groeben (German nobility)
- von Hallwyl (Swiss nobility)
- Joussineau de Tourdonnet (French nobility)
- Lagergren (Papal/Italian nobility)
- Landberg
- Moltke (German/Danish nobility)
- Moltke-Hvitfeldt (German/Danish nobility)
- de Paus (Papal/Italian nobility)
- von Platen-Hallermund (German nobility)
- Révay (Hungarian nobility)
- Reventlow (Danish/German nobility)
- Stolberg (German nobility)
- Tolstoy (Russian nobility)
- von Trampe (German nobility)

Barons

- von Bonsdorff (Finnish nobility)
- von Bredow (German nobility)
- von Buddenbrock
- von Buxhoeveden
- Cronstedt
- von Grothusen
- von Gussich
- von Leithner
- von Mecklenburg
- von der Osten-Sacken
- von der Pahlen (Russian nobility)
- von Rosen (Hoch-Rosen)
- Rosenørn-Lehn (Danish nobility)
- von Strauss
- von Wangenheim
- de Wendel (Portuguese nobility)

== Peerage and families ==
- List of Swedish noble families
- Duchies in Sweden
  - Duke of Estonia
  - Duke of Finland
  - Duke of Halland
- Swedish royal family

== Surnames ==
Surnames in Sweden can be traced to the 15th century, when they were first used by the Gentry (Frälse), i.e., priests and nobles. The names of these were usually in Swedish, Latin, German or Greek. The adoption of Latin names was first used by the Catholic clergy in the 15th century. The given name was preceded by Herr (Sir), followed by a Latinized form of patronymic names.

Starting from the time of the Reformation, a common naming practice among the clergy was to use the Latinized form of their birthplace (e.g. Laurentius Petri Gothus, from Östergötland). Later merchants and other social groups discarded the formerly used family names (such as patronymic surnames). Instead they adopted high-sounding Latin surnames. Another subsequent practice was the use of the Greek language, with the ending of -ander (the Greek word for man). The use of surnames was still quite uncommon in the 17th century among the nobility and the educated class. Furthermore, the concept of hereditary surnames was also limited to a few families.

When a family was ennobled, it was usually given a name—just as with lordships of England and other Western European countries. This was a period which produced a myriad of two-word Swedish-language family names for the nobility (very favored prefixes were Adler-, "eagle"; Ehren-, "honor"; Silfver-, "silver"; and Gyllen-, "golden"). The regular difference with Britain was that it became the new surname of the whole house, and the old surname was dropped altogether.

== Privileges ==
The noble estates are not abolished in Sweden, but their privileged position has been weakened step by step since 1680. The nobility's political privileges were practically abolished by the reformation of the Riksdag of the Estates in 1866, and the last rights of precedence to certain governmental offices were removed in the 1920s. By then the last tax exemption privileges had also been abolished. However, some minor privileges remained until 2003, including the right to be beheaded by sword, when the law granting these noble privileges was completely abolished and the government no longer has the right to call the heads of families to be assembled in session.

The prerogatives of nobility today are limited to protection of noble titles and certain elements and styles used in their coats of arms (this according to a 1762 act): a helm with an open visor, a coronet showing rank, a medallion and the use of supporters. Modern Swedish law makes no distinctions on the basis of nobility.

=== Crowns and coronets of rank ===
Royal (Kunglig) crown

Comital (Grevlig) coronet

Baronial (Friherrlig) coronet

Noble (Adlig) coronet

== Exceptional cases ==
Outside Sweden, Saint Bridget (1303–1373) became known as the Princess of Nericia, which appears to have been a noble, rather than a royal title, since she was not the daughter of a king.

== Gallery ==
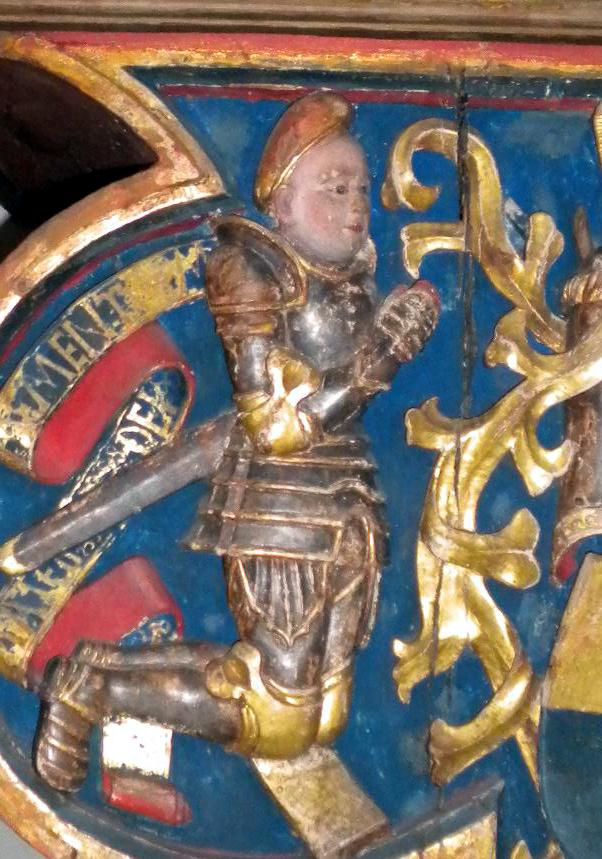
Sten Sture the Younger, statesman and regent of Sweden, during the era of the Kalmar Union.

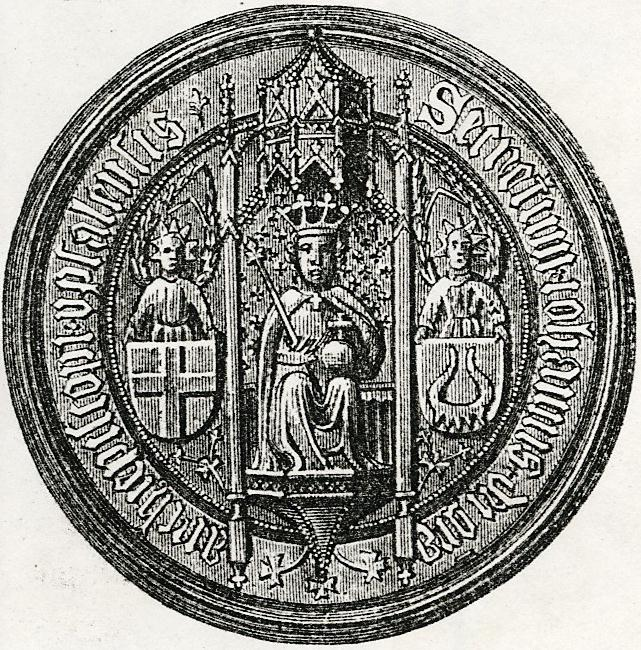
Jöns Bengtsson Oxenstierna, archbishop of Uppsala (1448–1467) and regent of Sweden, under the Kalmar Union

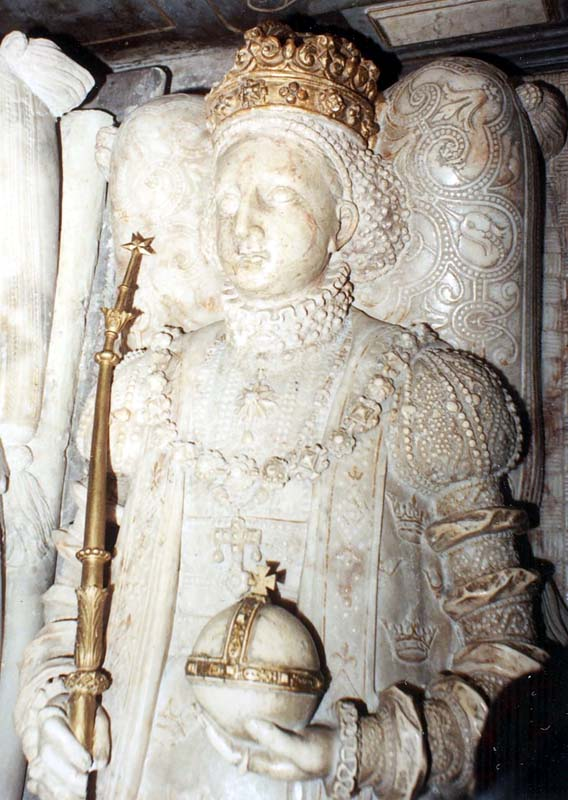
Margaret Leijonhufvud, noblewoman, Queen Consort of Sweden (1536-1551) and mother of kings

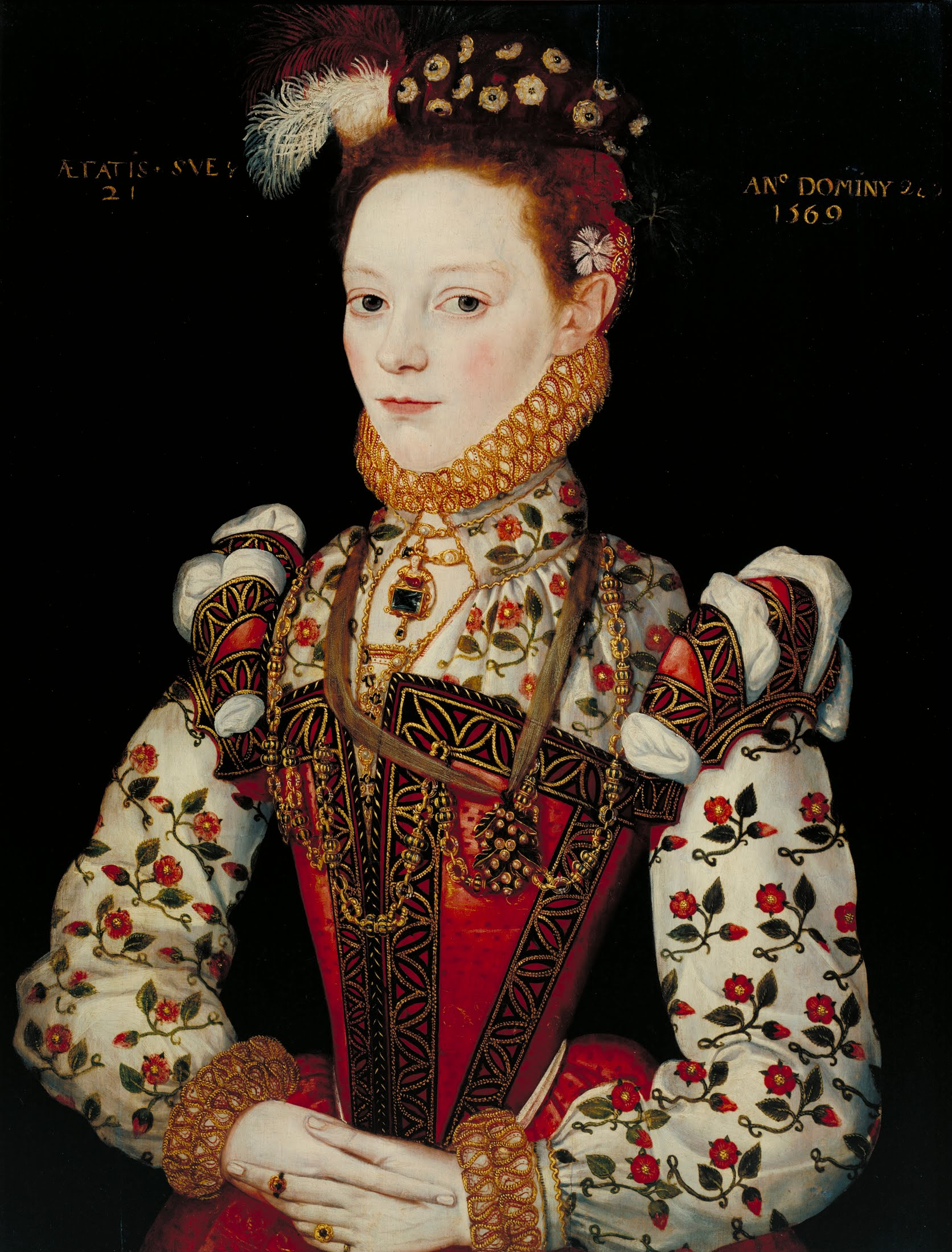
Helena Snakenborg, noblewoman, Maid of Honour of Queen Elizabeth I of England, and Marchioness of Northampton

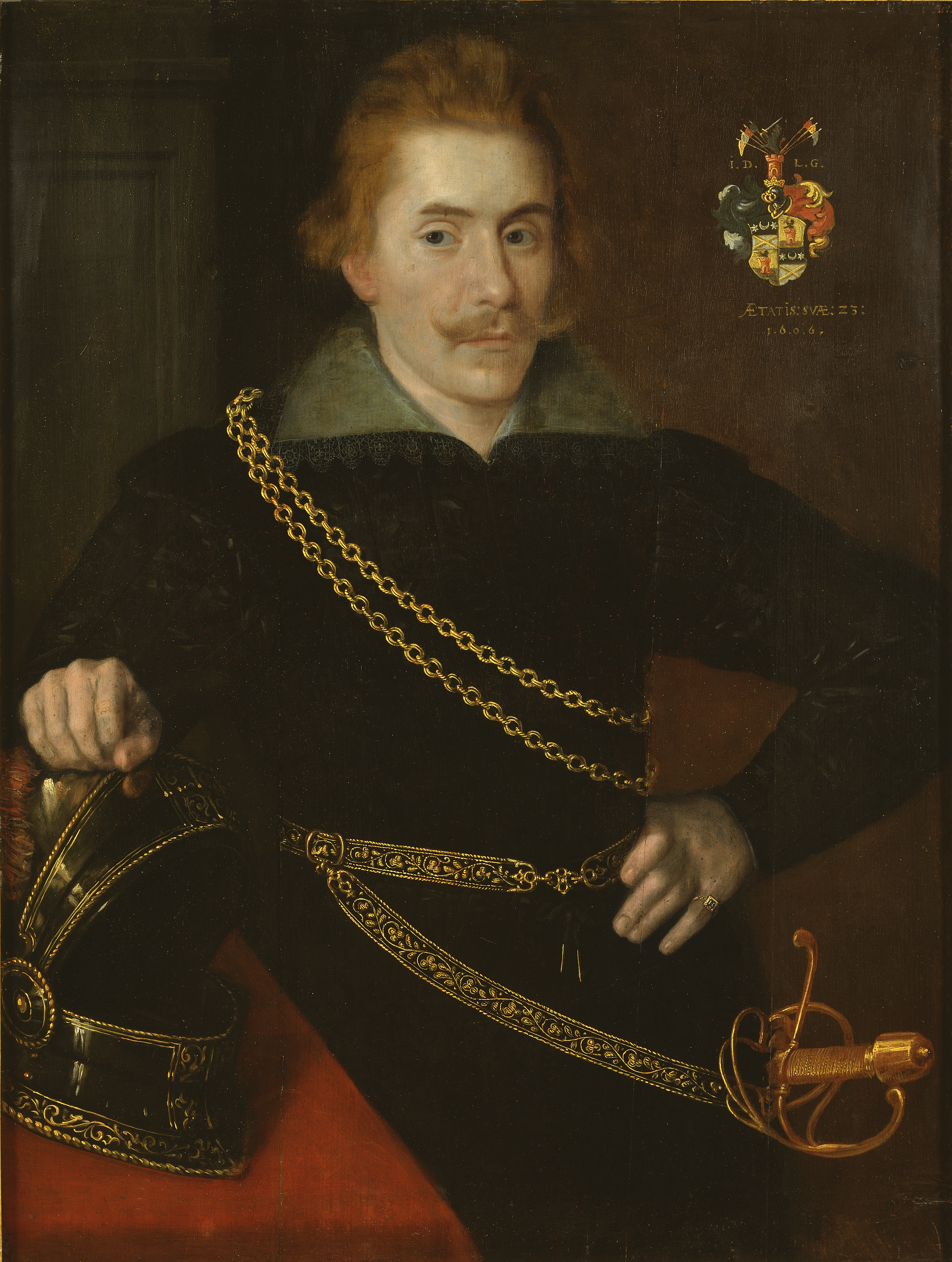
Count Jacob De la Gardie, statesman and a soldier of the Swedish Empire.

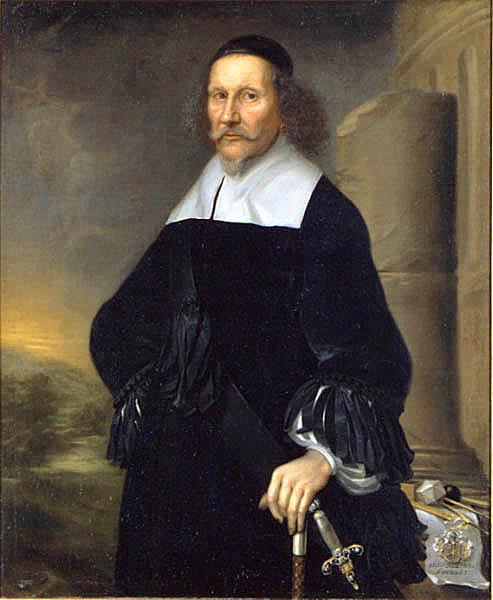
Georg Stiernhielm, civil servant, linguist and poet.

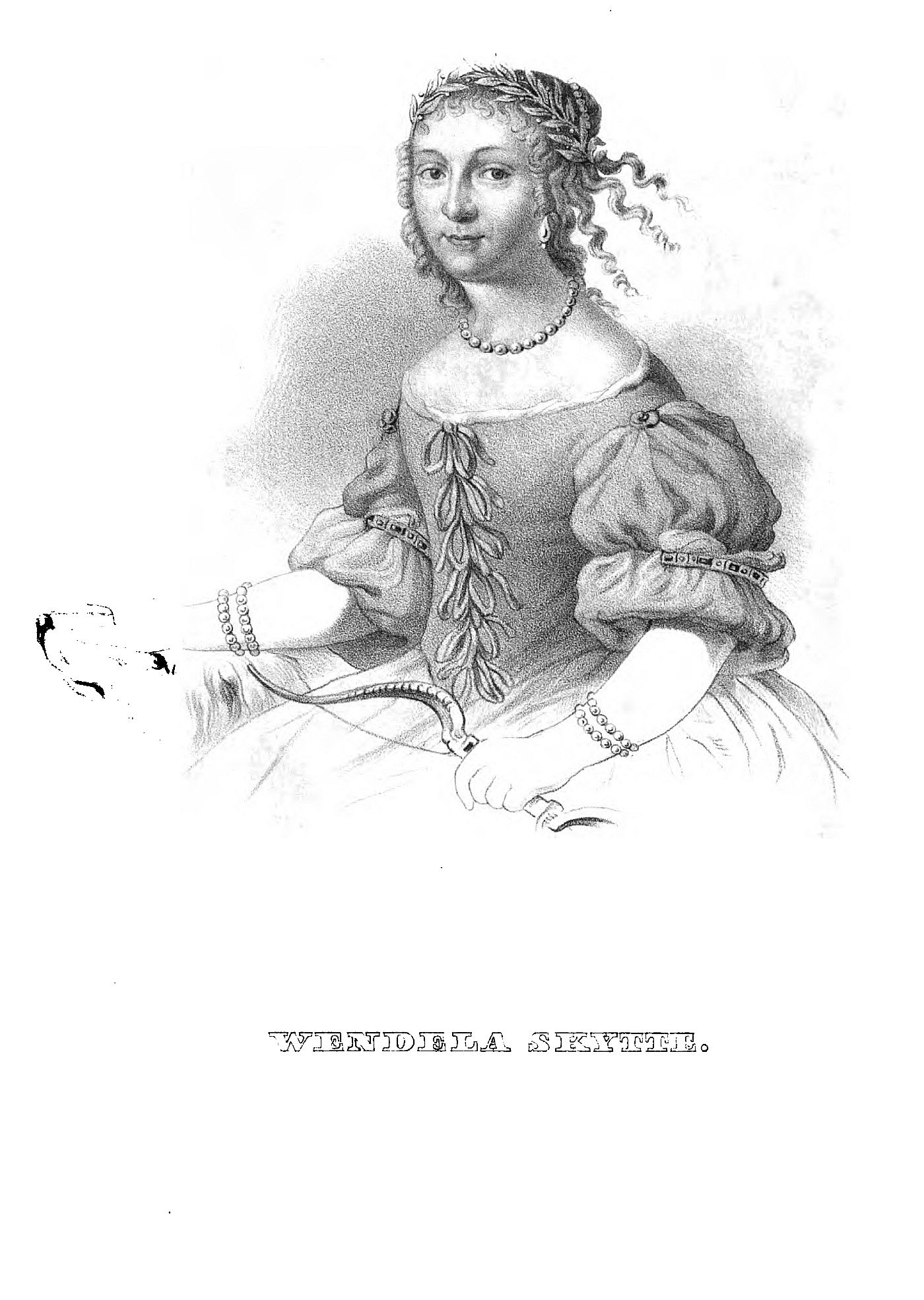
Vendela Skytte, salonist and writer, poet and Lady of Letters

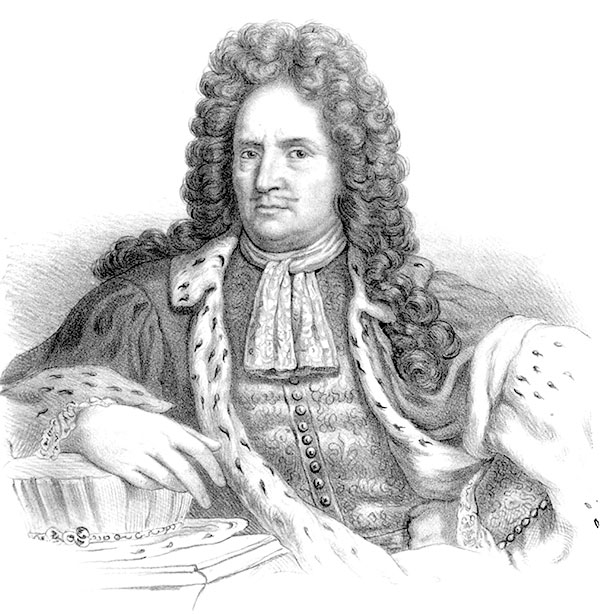
Erik Dahlbergh, engineer, soldier, and field marshal

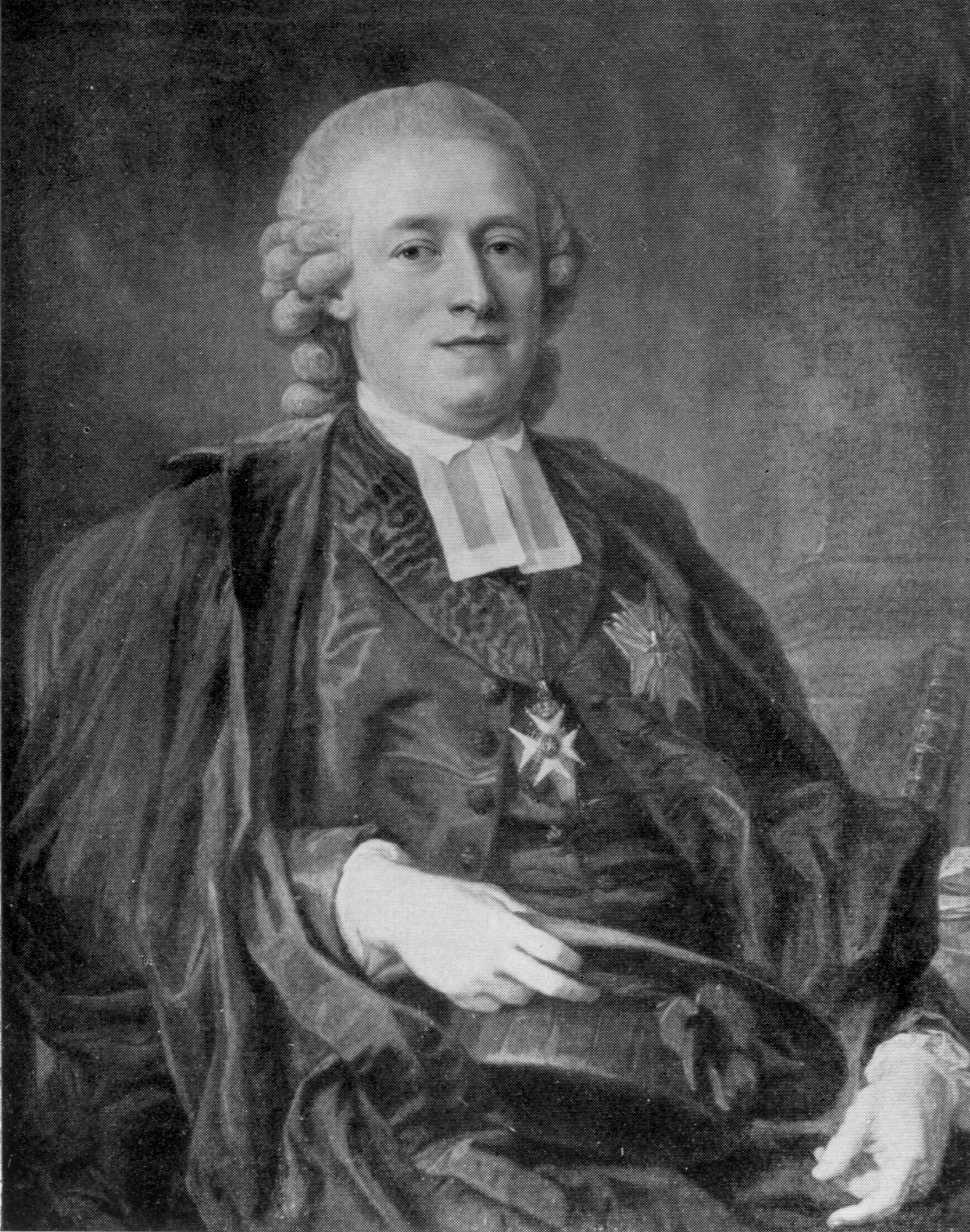
Uno von Troil, Archbishop of Uppsala

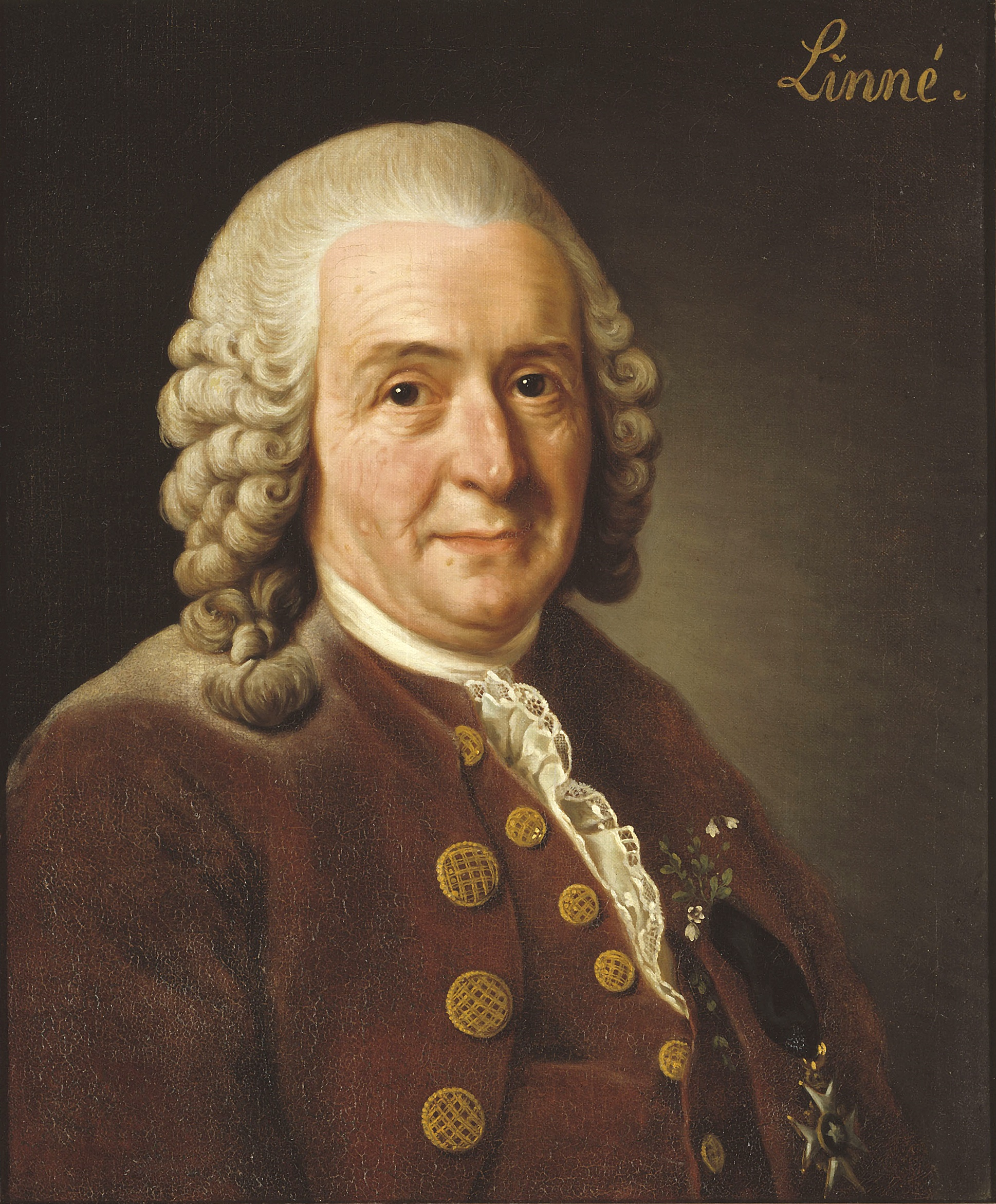
Carl von Linné, botanist, physician, and zoologist

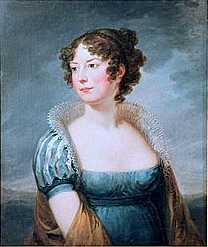
Countess Sophie Piper, Swedish noble and lady in waiting.

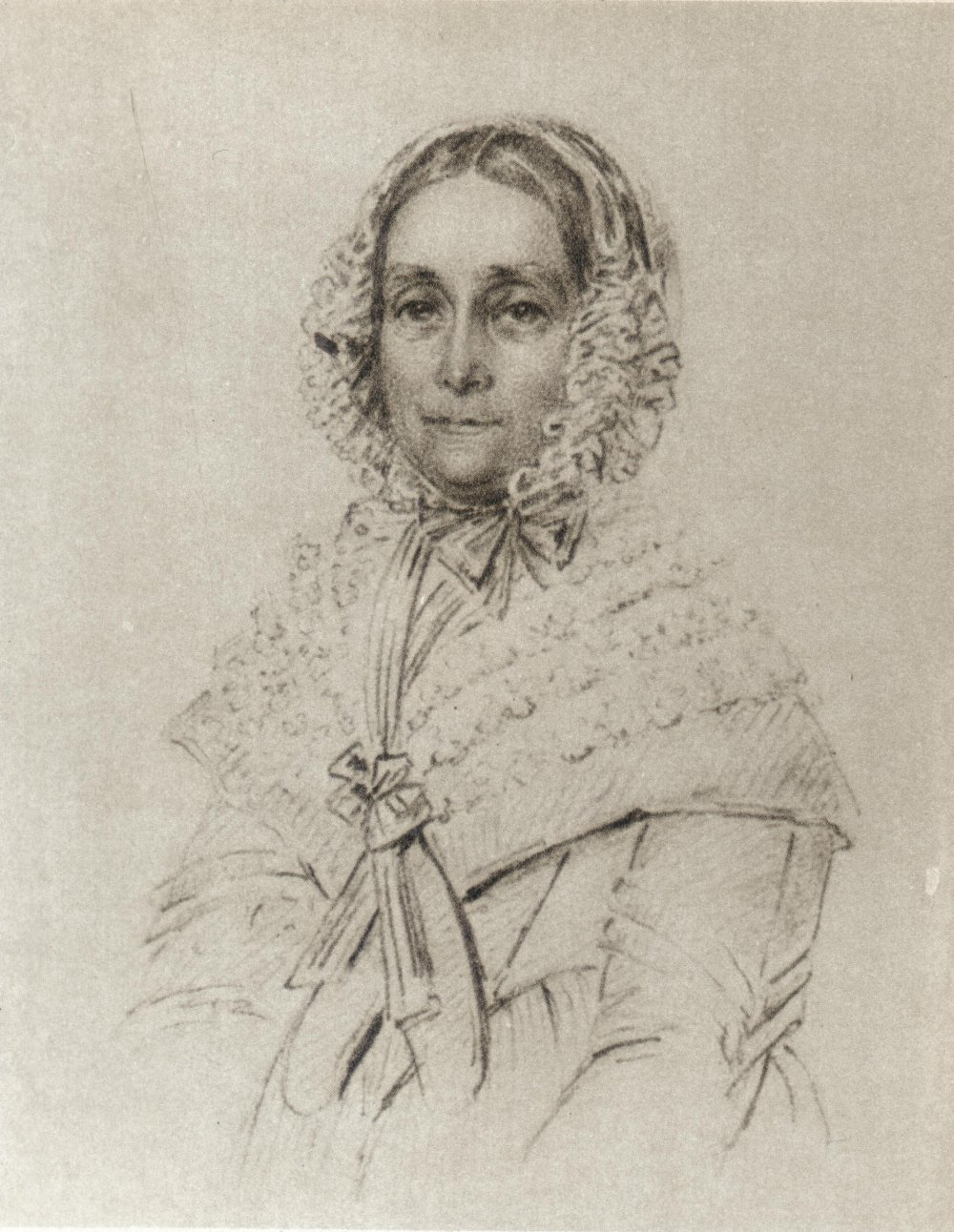
Malla Silfverstolpe, writer and salon hostess.

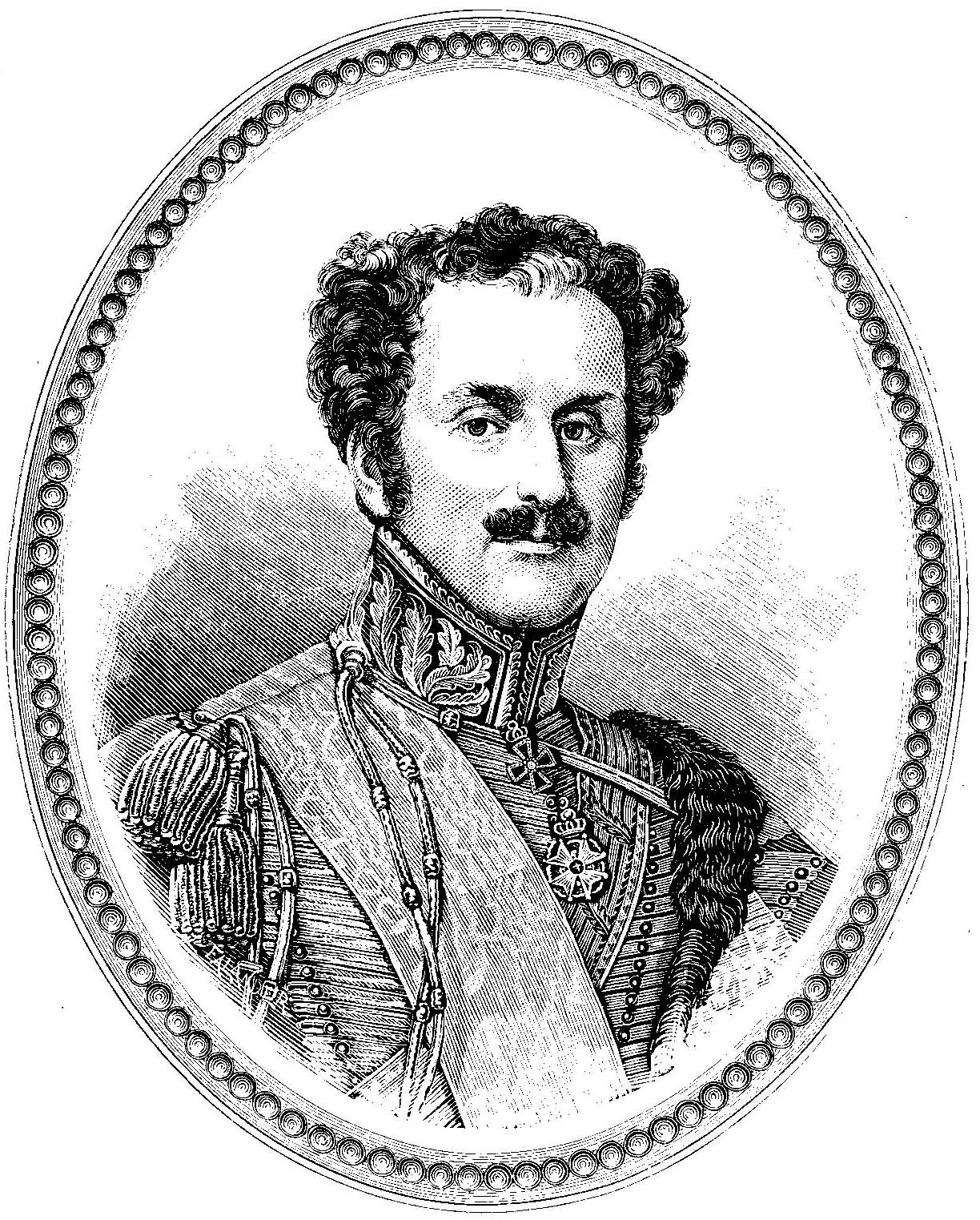
Magnus Brahe, statesman and soldier.

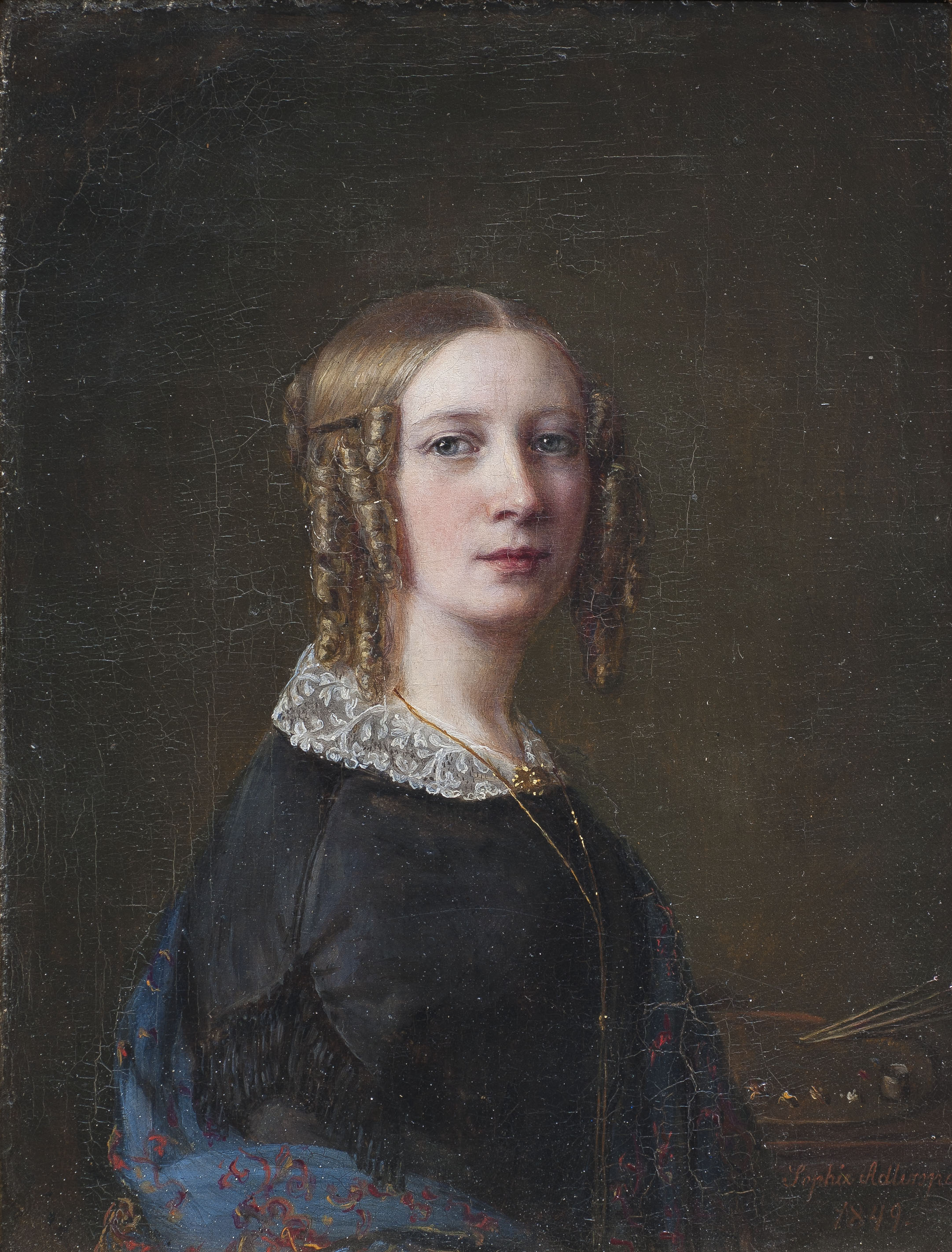
Sofia Adlersparre, painter

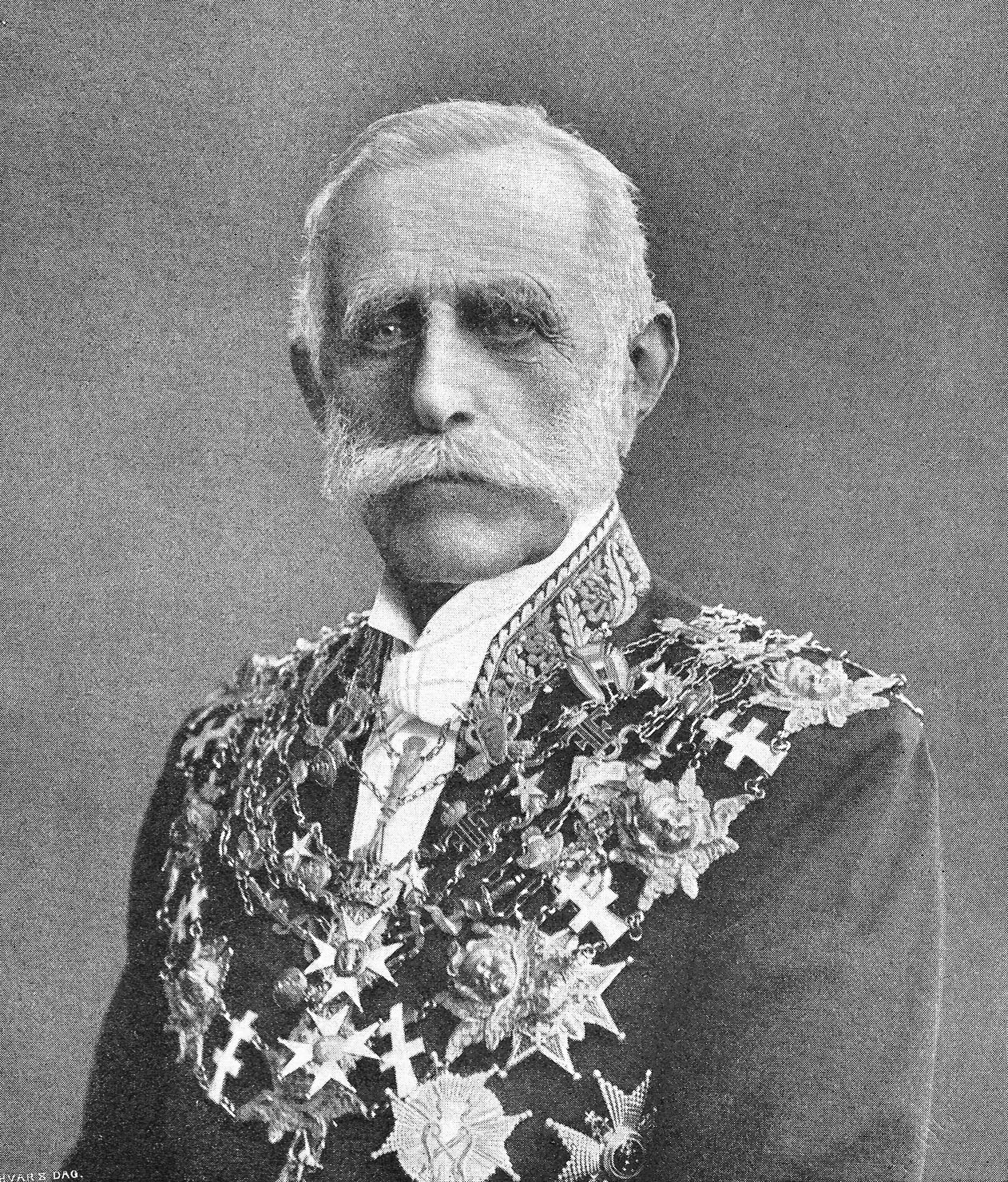
Baron Fredrik von Essen, Marshal of the Realm and landlord (Kavlås Castle)

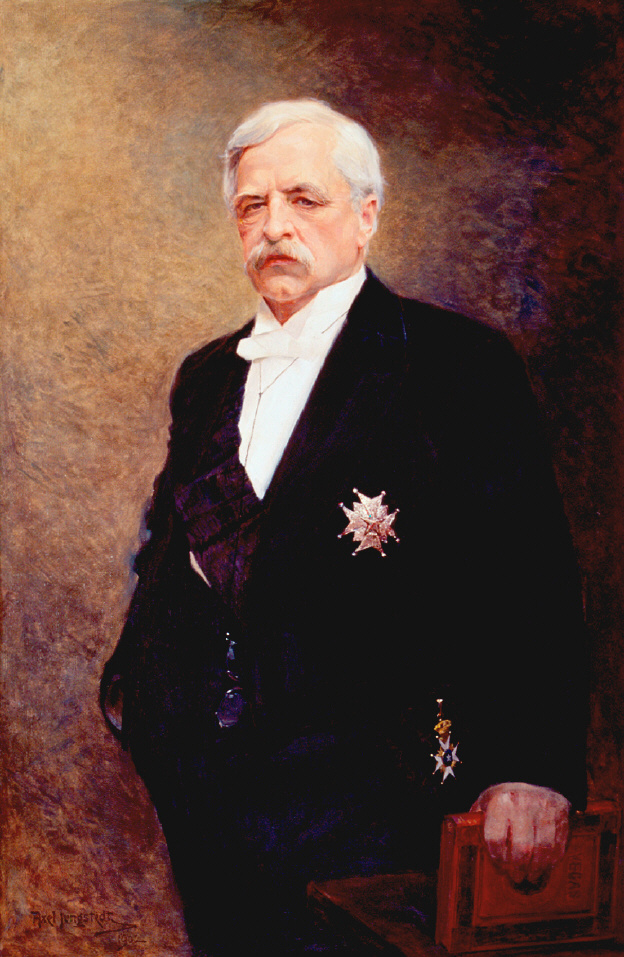
Baron Adolf Erik Nordenskiöld, botanist, geologist, mineralogist and arctic explorer

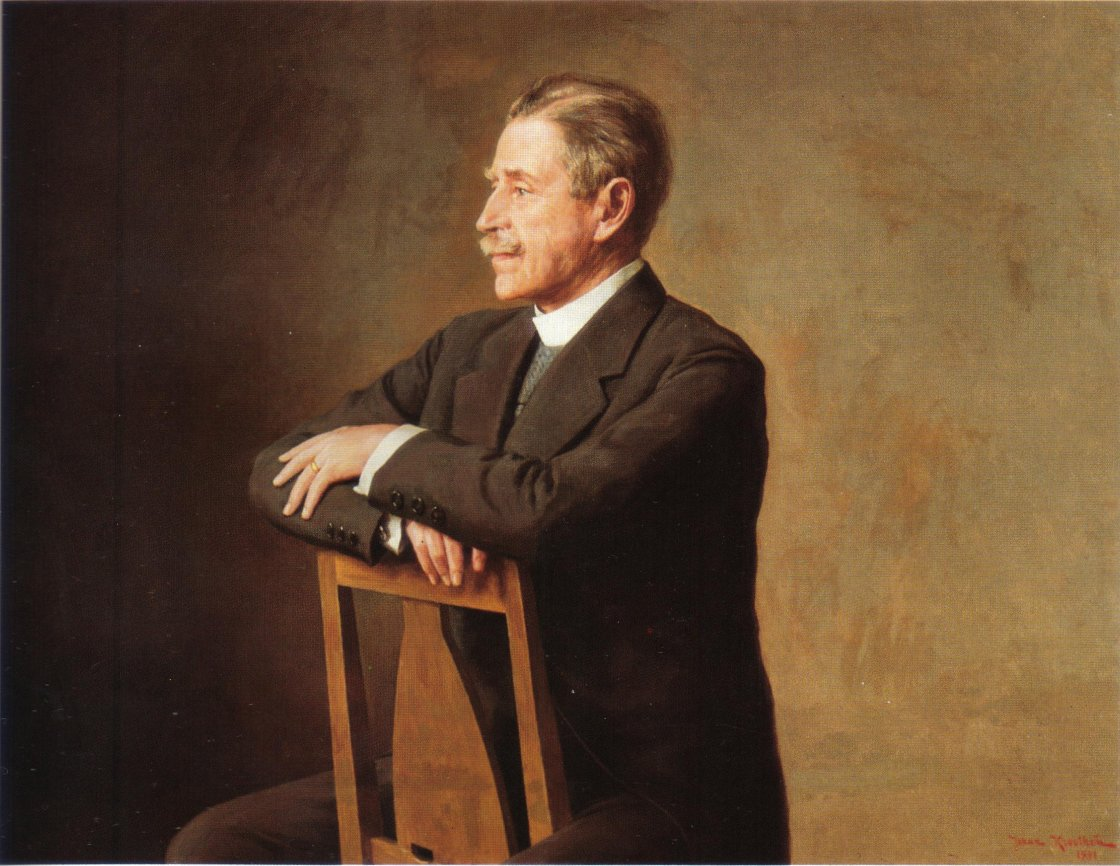
Verner von Heidenstam, poet and novelist, a laureate of the Nobel Prize in Literature

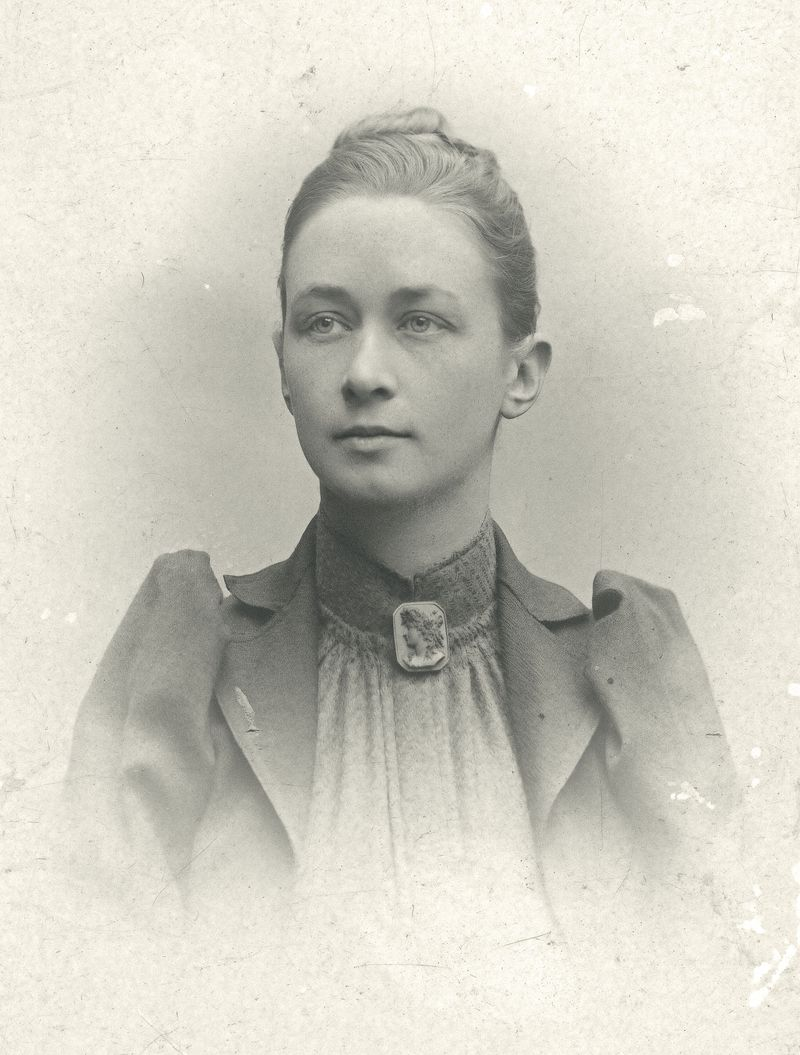
Hilma af Klint, artist and mystic

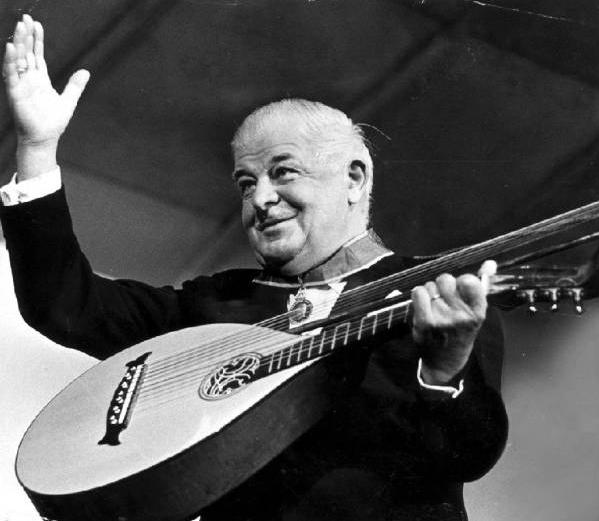
Evert Taube, author, artist, composer and singer.

== See also ==
- Junker Party
