= Landmarschall of Livonia =

Head of the Livonian Knighthood, 1643–1920

The Landmarschall of Livonia (German: Livländischer Landmarschall; Estonian: Liivimaa maamarssal; Latvian: Vidzemes landmaršals) was the highest elected representative of the Livonian Knighthood (Livländische Ritterschaft), the corporation of the Baltic German nobility of Livonia. He presided over the Landtag, the diet of the corporation, and directed its affairs between diets.

The office is first recorded in 1643, under Swedish rule, and lapsed with the dissolution of the Knighthood in 1920. It was in abeyance from 1694 to 1710 and again from 1783 to 1796. The corresponding officer of the Estonian nobility was the Ritterschaftshauptmann, and of the Courland nobility the Landesbevollmächtigter.

== History ==
The vassals of the territories of Old Livonia had organized themselves into corporations with rights of estates by the 14th century. After the collapse of the Livonian Confederation, the privilege granted by Sigismund II Augustus of Poland in 1561 recognized the Livonian Knighthood as the representative body of the country.

The office of Landmarschall dates from 1643, the year in which Sweden also established the Livonian Landratskollegium, a college of Landräte elected for life. A three-year term was confirmed by Queen Christina in 1648.

No Landmarschall held office between 1694 and 1710, a period covering the conflict between the Knighthood and the Swedish crown and the early years of the Great Northern War. From 1695 to 1700 the duties were discharged by a director of the diet (Landtagsdirektor).

Livonia capitulated to Russia in 1710 and the office was restored in the same year. Under the provincial reforms of Tsarina Catherine II the Baltic corporations were brought into line with the Russian nobility, and from 1783 the Livonian nobility was headed by a provincial marshal of the nobility (Gouvernementsmarschall). Tsar Paul I restored the earlier arrangement in 1796, and a Landmarschall was again in office from 1797.

Heinrich Eduard von Stryk, the last Landmarschall, resigned in January 1919; Hans von Rosen acted in his place in 1920. Estonia and Latvia dissolved the Baltic knighthoods in 1920.

== Duties ==
The Landmarschall presided over the Landtag, which was composed of the noble owners and lessees of manors entered in the Livonian matricula, and represented the Knighthood before the provincial and imperial authorities. Like the other elected offices of the corporation, the post was honorary and unsalaried; the day-to-day business of the Knighthood was handled by the resident member of the Landratskollegium. The Knighthood met at the Ritterhaus in Riga, and from 1862 in Saeima House on the Domplatz.

== List of officeholders ==
=== Landmarschalls, 1643–1693 ===
Term	Name
1643	Otto von Mengden (1600–1681)
1643	Engelbrecht von Mengden (1587–1650)
1645	Johann Eberhard von Bellingshausen (1604–1655)
1646	Heinrich von Cronstierna (1602–1678)
1646	Ernst von Mengden (1598–1655)
1648	Hermann von Gordian (d. 1672)
1650–1653	Gustav Adolf Clodt von Jürgensburg (1621–1681)
1653–1660	Gustav von Mengden (1625–1688)
1660–1664	Gustav Carl von Wulffen (1625–1684)
1664–1667	Gotthard Johann von Budberg (1634–1698)
1667–1669	Jakob Staël von Holstein (1628–1679)
1669–1670	Johann von Buddenbrock (d. 1670)
1670–1673	Jakob Staël von Holstein (second term)
1673–1676	Otto Friedrich von Vietinghoff (1640–1709)
1676–1680	Ernst Johann von Rosen
1680–1683	Otto Reinhold von Albedyll (1650–1697)
1683–1690	Georg Conrad von Ungern-Sternberg (1654–1708)
1690–1693	Johann Heinrich Streiff von Lauenstein (1647–1700)

=== Directors of the diet, 1695–1700 ===
Term	Name
1695	Gustav Ernst von Albedyll (d. 1721)
1697	Friedrich von Plater (d. 1700)
1697	Gustav Ernst von Albedyll (second term)
1699, 1700	Leonhard Gustav von Budberg (1640–1708)

=== Landmarschalls, 1710–1783 ===
Term	Name
1710	Georg Reinhold von Tiesenhausen (1650–1734)
1710	Johann Albrecht von Mengden von Altenwoga (1663–1720)
1710–1712	Magnus Gustav von Mengden von Altenwoga (1663–1726)
1712–1717	Magnus Johann von Plater
1720–1723	Woldemar Johann von Ungern-Sternberg (1684–1741)
1723–1727	Gotthard Wilhelm von Budberg (1685–1749)
1727–1730	Gotthard Wilhelm von Berg (1682–1756)
1730–1737	Caspar Friedrich von Buddenbrock (d. 1737)
1737–1742	Johann Gustav von Budberg (1693–1754)
1742–1747	Heinrich Gustav von Patkul (1698–1778)
1747–1759	Gustav Heinrich von Igelström (1695–1771)
1759–1765	Leonhard Johann von Budberg-Bönninghausen (1727–1796)
1765	Adolf Heinrich von Anrep (1717–1765)
1765–1775	Carl Gustav Mengden von Altenwoga (1723–1775)
1775–1777	Caspar Heinrich von Rosenkampf (1734–1790)
1777–1783	Franz Wilhelm von Rennenkampff (1743–1784)

Berend Dietrich von Bock (1715–1720) and Otto Christoph von Richter (1717–1721) served in the same period as Landmarschalls of the Dorpat district.

=== Provincial marshals of the nobility, 1783–1797 ===
Term	Name
1783–1786	Leonhard Johann von Budberg-Bönninghausen (second term)
1786–1792	Moritz Friedrich von Gersdorff (1747–1820)
1792–1797	Friedrich Wilhelm von Sivers (1748–1823)
1797	Otto Johann Magnus von Richter (1755–1826), acting

=== Landmarschalls, 1797–1920 ===
Term	Name
1797	Carl Gustav von Samson-Himmelstjerna (1750–1825)
1797–1798	Friedrich Wilhelm von Sivers (acting; second term)
1798–1800	Christian Friedrich von Ungern-Sternberg (1754–1801)
1800–1803	Gustav Johann von Buddenbrock (1758–1821)
1803–1806	Carl Gustav von Samson-Himmelstjerna (second term)
1806–1809	Carl Johann von Nummers (1757–1822)
1809–1812	Andreas von Below (1763–1820)
1812–1818	Friedrich Reinhold Schoultz von Ascheraden (1766–1833)
1818–1822	Friedrich von Loewis of Menar (1767–1824)
1822–1824	Otto Johann Magnus von Richter (acting; second term)
1824–1827	Georg Carl von Jarmerstedt (1778–1851)
1827–1830	Friedrich Johann von Loewenwolde (1776–1832)
1830–1833	Friedrich von Grote (1768–1836)
1833–1836	Carl Gotthard von Liphart (1778–1853)
1836–1838	Gustav Eduard Christoph von Richter (1790–1847)
1839–1842	Alexander von Oettingen (1798–1846)
1842–1844	August von Hagemeister (1785–1869)
1844–1848	Karl Reinhold Georg von Lilienfeld (1790–1875)
1848–1851	Wilhelm Hamilkar von Fölkersahm (1811–1856)
1851–1854	Gustav Frommhold von Nolcken (1815–1879)
1854–1856	Christian von Stein (1806–1856)
1857–1862	August Georg Friedrich von Oettingen (1823–1908)
1862–1866	Paul von Lieven (1821–1881)
1866–1869	Georg Carl von Lilienfeld (1828–1881)
1869–1870	Gustav Frommhold von Nolcken (second term)
1870–1872	Nikolai Conrad Peter von Oettingen (1826–1876)
1872–1884	Heinrich Anton Hermann Moritz Friedrich von Bock (1818–1903)
1884–1908	Friedrich Gottlieb Alexander Casimir von Meyendorff (1839–1911)
1908–1918	Adolf Pilar von Pilchau (1851–1925)
1918–1919	Heinrich Eduard von Stryk (1873–1938)
1920	Hans von Rosen (1870–1945)

== See also ==
- Livonian Knighthood
- Baltic knighthoods
- Marshal of Nobility (Russia)
- Governorate of Livonia

== Bibliography ==
- Krusenstjern, Georg von. Die Landmarschälle und Landräte der Livländischen und der Öselschen Ritterschaft in Bildnissen. Hamburg: Harry von Hofmann Verlag, 1963.
- Rautenfeld, C. von. "Die livländischen Landmarschälle von 1643 bis 1899". Baltische Monatsschrift 47 (1899): 145–212.
- Tobien, Alexander von. Die livländische Ritterschaft in ihrem Verhältnis zum Zarismus und russischen Nationalismus. Vol. 1, Riga: G. Löffler, 1925; vol. 2, Berlin: Walter de Gruyter, 1930.
- Wolff, Nicolas. Livland's Landräte und Landmarschälle. Tartu: K. Matthiesens Buchdruckerei, 1932.
