= Wendel (Swedish family) =

Swedish noble family

Wendel (de Wendel upon ennoblement) is a Swedish noble family, forming part of the country's unintroduced nobility. Max Richard Wendel (1863–1922), Civil Engineer and Royal Spanish Consul in Gothenborg, was awarded the hereditary primogeniture title of Baron by Carlos I of Portugal in 1895. His eldest son, Carlos Harald Bruno Richard de Wendel (1901–1980), inherited the title upon his death.

The family is not related to the French de Wendel family.
