= Buddenbrock =

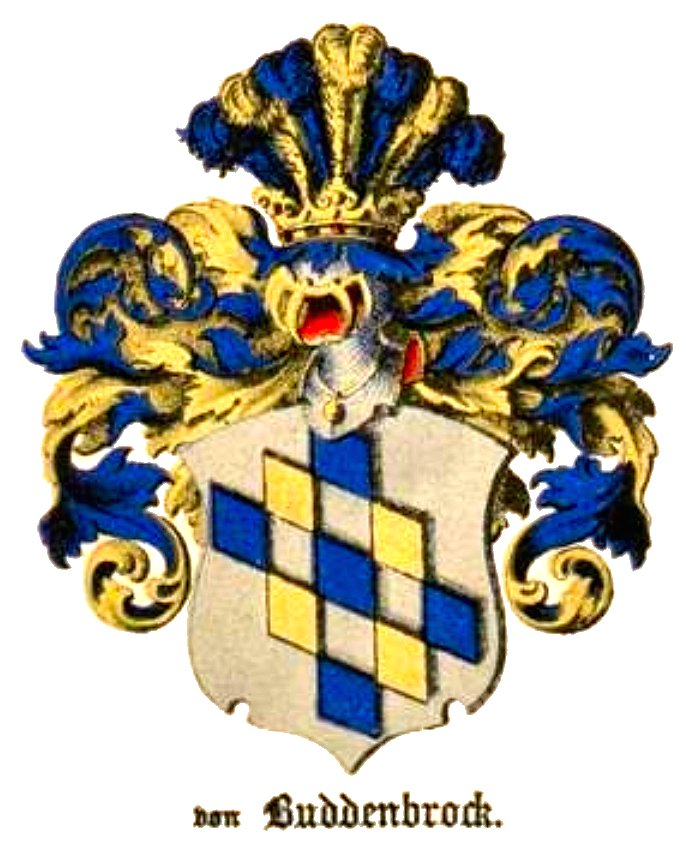
Coat of arms of Buddenbrock family

The Buddenbrock family is the a Baltic German noble family of Hanseatic origin, whose members occupied significant positions in Prussia, Courland and Sweden.

== History ==
First written record of the Buddenbrock family dates back to 14th century. In 1620, the family members became part of Courland nobility, while in 1729, they became part of Swedish nobility. Henrik Magnus von Buddenbrock was awarded with the hereditary title of Baron in 1731 by King Frederick I of Sweden. The family was also awarded with the title of Baron in Prussia, by Frederick William II of Prussia. This title was recognized again on February 28, 1885 by William I, German Emperor.

== Notable members ==
- Wilhelm Dietrich von Buddenbrock (1672–1757), Prussian cavalry leader
- Henrik Magnus von Buddenbrock (1685–1743), Swedish baron and lieutenant general who was executed after the Battle of Villmanstrand

== See also ==
- Buddenbrooks (disambiguation)
- Buddenbrock Range, mountains in Antarctica
- Buddenbrockia, a genus of myxozoans of family Saccosporidae
