= Jakob Staël von Holstein =

Swedish military engineer, architect and Livonian official (1628–1679)

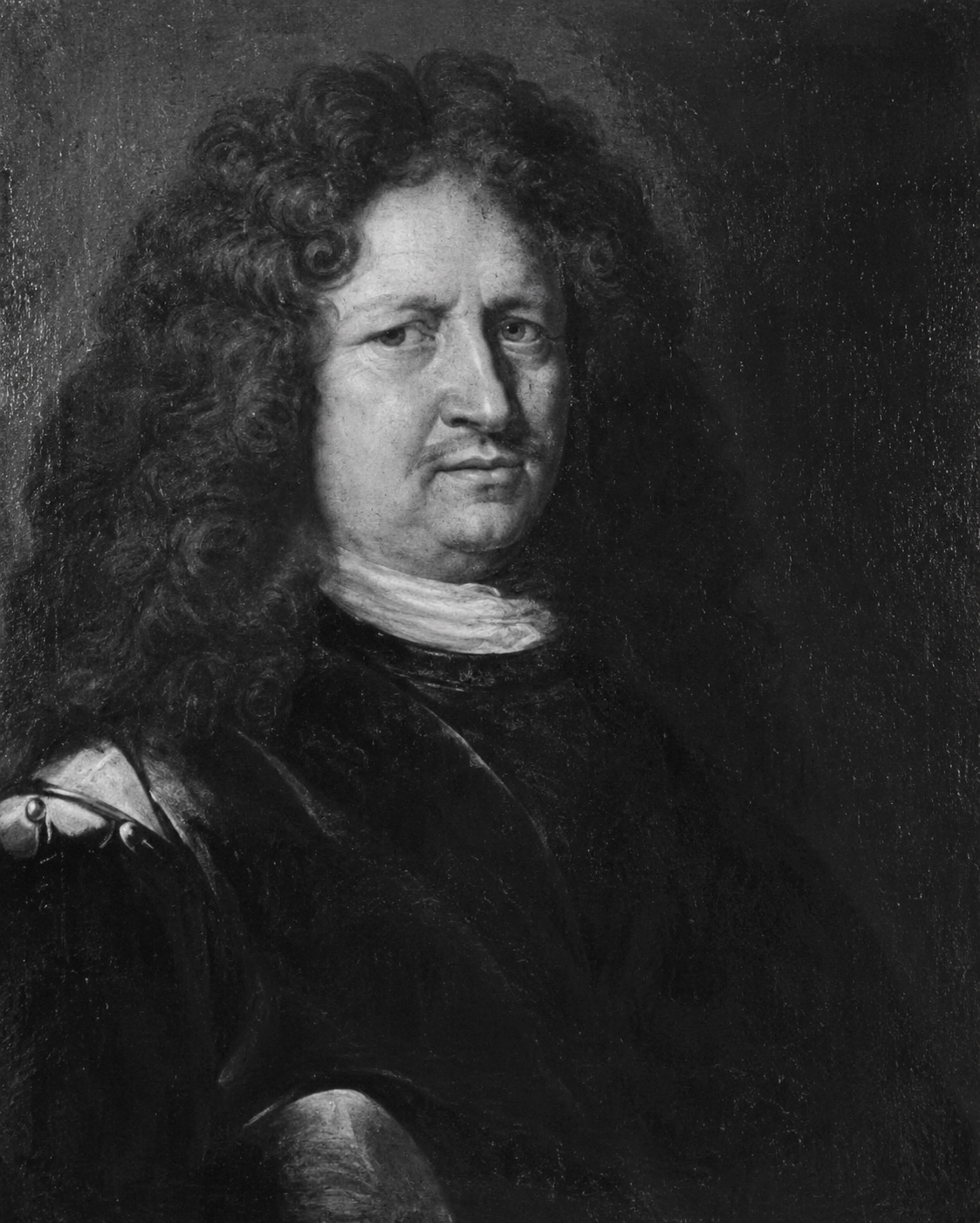
- Portrait of Jakob Staël von Holstein
- Born: 28 May 1628; Pernau, Swedish Livonia
- Died: 2 October 1679 (aged 51); Swedish Livonia
- Occupations: Military officer, military engineer, architect
- Known for: Fortification of the Swedish Baltic provinces; early Palladian architecture in Estonia
- Title: Landmarschall of Livonia (1667–1669, 1670–1673)
- Spouse: Anna Sophia von Ungern-Sternberg
- Children: 7, including Otto Wilhelm Staël von Holstein and Jakob Axel Staël von Holstein
- Parent(s): Matthias Staël von Holstein, Elisabeth Hartwigh
- Family: Staël von Holstein

Jakob Staël von Holstein (28 May 1628 – 2 October 1679) was a Swedish military engineer, artillery officer, architect and official in the Swedish Baltic provinces. From 1660 until his death he directed the fortification works of Livonia, Estonia and Ingria, and he also held high civil office in Livonia as Landmarschall and Landrat. He is regarded as an early exponent of Palladianism in the eastern Baltic and is credited with the design of some of the first classicising country houses and town palaces built in present-day Estonia.

Born in Pernau as the son of the town's burgomaster, he studied mathematics and mechanics and travelled in Germany, the Netherlands and Italy before entering Swedish service. He was naturalized as a Swedish nobleman in 1652, served in the Second Northern War as commandant of Køge, and in 1660 was appointed colonel of the artillery in the Baltic provinces with responsibility for their fortifications. He was shot dead in 1679 by members of the Mengden family.

== Early life and education ==
Jakob was born on 28 May 1628 in Pernau (now Pärnu), then part of Swedish Livonia. He was the youngest son of Matthias Staël von Holstein (died 1650), councillor and later burgomaster of Pernau, and of Elisabeth Hartwigh, daughter of the Pernau councillor Berend Hartwigh. His father belonged to the Livonian branch of the Rhenish noble house of Staël von Holstein, established there in the 14th century.

After studying mathematics and mechanics, Jakob received in 1649 a travelling scholarship for three years of study abroad. Between 1649 and 1652 he travelled in Germany, the Netherlands and Italy. His stay in the Dutch Republic was of particular importance for his architectural formation: the inventory of his architectural library, drawn up after his death, contained many Netherlandish publications, including works by Hans Vredeman de Vries, Hendrick de Keyser, Peter Paul Rubens, Philips Vingboons and Nicolaus Goldmann, as well as Dutch translations of Serlio and Scamozzi.

== Military career ==
=== Naturalization and early service ===
On his return in 1652 Staël von Holstein entered the Swedish artillery as a volunteer. On 14 October of that year Queen Christina naturalized him, together with his brothers and cousins, as a Swedish nobleman; the family was introduced at the House of Nobility in 1675 under number 834.

He later transferred to the infantry and rose to lieutenant colonel in the Uppland Regiment, taking part in the Polish and Danish wars of Charles X Gustav between 1654 and 1660.

=== Commandant of Køge ===
In 1658 he was appointed commandant of Køge in Denmark, where the Swedish army had its headquarters during the siege of Copenhagen. Together with Erik Dahlbergh he drew up plans for fortifying the town, and he was occupied with the work until the end of the war.

=== Director of fortifications in the Baltic provinces ===
On 29 May 1660, shortly after the Treaty of Copenhagen, Staël von Holstein was appointed colonel of the artillery in Livonia, Estonia, Ingria and on Ösel, an office that also carried responsibility for the fortresses; he was later styled director of the fortification service in the provinces and quartermaster general. He spent the remainder of his life mainly in the Baltic provinces. His position was semi-independent of the quartermaster general in Sweden and he answered directly to the governor-general; his remit was later extended to Finland.

An active and driving administrator, he pressed for reforms in the organization of the fortification service and worked continually on plans and drawings for new fortifications and for the improvement and strengthening of existing ones, among them Narva, Ivangorod, Neumünde, Riga, Nyen, Nöteborg, Viborg and Tavastehus. At Reval his works included the strengthening of the town's bastion front, among them the Wismar ravelin. The Crown showed its appreciation through several donations of estates, although on a couple of occasions he was accused of high-handedness and neglect.

In 1666 he became a member of the war council (krigsråd). In the summer of 1673 he accompanied Charles XI on an inspection of the defences of southern and western Sweden and afterwards wrote a report on the state of their fortifications, later printed in translation in Tidskrift för Svenska Ingenieurer (1850). In the same year he was also made governor (ståthållare) of Reval Castle.

=== Scanian War ===
After the death of the quartermaster general Johan Wärnschiöldh in 1674, the Marshal of the Realm Carl Gustaf Wrangel wished Staël von Holstein to succeed him. He was formally commissioned in February 1674 as war councillor and quartermaster general, but never took up the latter post, which went instead to Erik Dahlbergh; Wrangel preferred to employ him as commander of the field artillery in the coming war against Brandenburg. In August 1674 he was promoted major general of artillery, with the right also to command infantry, while retaining direction of the fortification works in the Baltic provinces, which during his absence were administered by his half-brother Johan Staël von Holstein and Christian Thumb von Weingarten.

He served as chief of artillery in the unsuccessful German campaign of 1675 while also supervising the fortification service in Pomerania. At the Battle of Fehrbellin he replaced the burnt bridge over the Rhin with another, over which Waldemar (Wolmar) Wrangel was able to continue the retreat towards Wittstock after the defeat. He was exonerated of any responsibility for the defeat, and discharged his duties in the war without censure.

After Denmark also declared war he was transferred to Scania, directing for part of 1677 the siege works against Kristianstad, in particular the damming works at Åhus, and afterwards assisting Magnus Gabriel De la Gardie in the defence of the Norwegian frontier. On 28 February 1678 he resumed the direction of fortifications in Estonia, Livonia and Ingria, over the reservations of the Council of War, which had wanted Dahlbergh to hold overall responsibility there as well; in 1679 he submitted a report on the state of the provincial fortifications to the council.

== Civil offices in Livonia ==
Staël von Holstein was Landmarschall of Livonia in 1667–1669 and again in 1670–1673, and from 1673 until his death a Landrat (provincial councillor) of Livonia. He has been described as a capable fortification officer, and was not among those members of the Baltic German nobility who were hostile to Swedish rule.

== Architecture ==
Alongside his official duties Staël von Holstein worked as a private architect. He has been described as the first person active in present-day Estonia who can be called an architect in the modern sense, distinguished from the master builders who preceded him both by his social position and by his theoretical training. Because the surviving drawings associated with him are unsigned, most individual attributions rest on stylistic and documentary inference rather than on signed evidence.

The best-documented work attributed to him is the main building of Maardu manor near Reval, built in the 1660s for Fabian von Fersen, governor of Riga; the Dehio handbook of monuments in the Baltic states names him as its architect and notes that the manor houses of Aa and Palmse share its ground plan. Palmse, whose two-storey main building was completed in 1697, well after his death, is also assigned to his design in Estonian literature. He is further credited with the town palace of Axel von Rosen at Pikk 28 in Reval, built about 1670–1674 and since 1994 the Swedish embassy, with his own residence on Toompea, and with the house of Engelbrecht Richter in Riga. Some accounts of Pikk 28 name only the master mason Gert Forberg and treat the designer as unknown.

These buildings, with their symmetrical plans and classicising elevations, are counted among the earliest Palladian works in Estonia and also show the influence of contemporary Dutch architecture.

== Estates ==
Staël von Holstein held Heydenfeld and Kujen in Lasdohn parish, granted to him in fief in 1661, Hintzenberg in Neuermühlen parish, which he bought in 1662, and Ramkau in Neu-Pebalg parish, which he took in pledge in 1670, all in Livonia, together with Hannijöggi (Anija) and Jegelecht (Jõelähtme) in Estonia.

== Death ==
In 1679, as a result of a long-standing family quarrel, Staël von Holstein challenged Major General Baron Gustaf von Mengden, the stepson of his sister-in-law, to a duel. Instead, on 1 October he was set upon on the open road by an armed band led by Mengden and by Mengden's son, Lieutenant Colonel Baron Otto Reinhold von Mengden, and shot from behind; he died of his wounds the next day. The younger Mengden was sentenced to death by a court martial.

== Family ==
In January 1664 Staël von Holstein married Baroness Anna Sophia von Ungern-Sternberg, daughter of Lieutenant Colonel Wolmar von Ungern-Sternberg and Sophia von Uexküll.

Their children were:

- Sophia Elisabeth (born 1664), married first Major Otto Reinhold von Berg and second Major General Hans Johan Gyllenlood
- Carl Jakob (1666–1693), captain in French service, died unmarried
- Otto Wilhelm Staël von Holstein (1668–1730), major general and from 1719 a Swedish baron
- Fabian Ernst Staël von Holstein (1672–1730), adjutant general and Landrat of Estonia
- Jakobina Juliana (baptized 1675 – died 1721), married Adjutant General Gotthard Henrik von Lantingshausen
- Jakoba Juliana (1678–1698), married Captain Johan Friedrich von Ulrich
- Jakob Axel Staël von Holstein (1680–1730), colonel in Polish service, born after his father's death, known for the duel in 1720 in which he killed the Dano-Norwegian vice admiral Peter Wessel Tordenskjold

Previous: Gotthard Johann von Budberg	Landmarschall of Livonia; 1667–1669	Next: Johann von Buddenbrock
Previous: Johann von Buddenbrock	Landmarschall of Livonia; 1670–1673	Next: Otto Friedrich von Vietinghoff
