= Otto Wilhelm Staël von Holstein =

- Born: 28 June 1668; Estonia
- Died: 27 April 1730 (aged 61); Stockholm, Sweden
- Relatives: Jakob Staël von Holstein (father)
- Military career
- Allegiance: (yes) Swedish Empire
- Branch: Swedish Army
- Service years: 1684–1728
- Rank: Major general
- Commands: Halland Regiment; Uppland Regiment
- Conflicts: Nine Years' War; Great Northern War; War of the Spanish Succession

Otto Wilhelm Staël von Holstein (28 June 1668 – 27 April 1730) was a Swedish baron and military officer who rose to major general. A member of the Baltic German Staël von Holstein family, he was the son of General Jakob Staël von Holstein and Anna Sofia von Ungern-Sternberg. In 1719 he was created a baron (friherre) by Queen Ulrika Eleonora, the first member of the family to be raised to the rank in Sweden.

== Career ==
Staël von Holstein entered the Life Guards as a volunteer in 1684, became an ensign in the Västerbotten Regiment in 1687 and a lieutenant in 1690, (Note: One source cited by Elgenstierna gives 16 September 1689.) and took service abroad the same year. In French service he was a captain in Zurlauben's regiment in 1692 before his discharge in 1693, after which he held captain's commissions in Swedish regiments in Dutch service and, from 1696, again in the Västerbotten Regiment. He was promoted adjutant general in 1700.

He became a lieutenant colonel in the guard of the Duke of Holstein-Gottorp in 1701, lieutenant colonel and commandant of the Holstein artillery in 1704, and lieutenant colonel in General Berner's Holstein infantry regiment in 1708, and was made colonel in 1709. In 1712 he was appointed colonel of the Adelsfanan (the Swedish nobility cavalry), and in 1717 major general of infantry and colonel of the Halland Regiment. He was elevated to baron on 2 June 1719 and introduced at the House of Nobility under number 155, and in 1728 he became colonel of the Uppland Regiment.

== Military service ==
During his foreign service Staël von Holstein took part in the Nine Years' War, at the Brabant campaign of 1690, the siege of Mons and the action at Leuze in 1691, and the sieges of Namur and Charleroi and the Battle of Steenkerque in 1692. In the Great Northern War he fought at the Crossing of the Düna in 1701. After the death of the Duke of Holstein-Gottorp, the dowager duchess Hedvig Sofia sent him several times as a courier to her brother Charles XII in Poland, in the course of which he was present at the siege of Thorn in 1703; he later followed the king on the march into Saxony. With his Holstein regiment he served in the War of the Spanish Succession at the sieges of Tournai (1709), Saint-Venant (1710) and Bouchain (1711). In 1718 he took part in Charles XII's second invasion of Norway and was present at the Siege of Fredriksten on 30 November 1718, when the king was killed. He also sat in the Riksdag of the Estates in 1719–1720 and 1726–1727.

== Family ==
Staël von Holstein married first, on 20 January 1713, Countess Christina Catharina Lewenhaupt (1674–1714), who died in childbirth; and second, in 1716, Baroness Elisabet Stuart (baptized 1691, living 1756), daughter of Lieutenant General Carl Magnus Stuart. He died in Stockholm on 27 April 1730.

By his first marriage he had a child who was born and died on 29 July 1714. His children by his second marriage were:

- Carl Jacob (1717–1775), Swedish colonel
- Sofia Margareta (1718)
- Fredrik (1719–1746)
- Otto Wilhelm (1721–1722)
- Wilhelmina (1724–1786), married Baron Joachim Beck-Friis
- Anna Helena Juliana (1725–1729)
- Hedvig Elisabet (1727–1787)
