= Hertig =

Hertig is a German language surname and a variant of the surname Hertwig, itself variant of Hartwig. Notable people with the name include:

- Charly Hertig (1939–2012), Swiss footballer and manager
- Philippe Hertig (1965), Swiss former footballer
