= Buddenbrooks (disambiguation) =

Buddenbrooks is a 1901 novel by Thomas Mann.

Buddenbrooks or The Buddenbrooks may also refer to:

- The Buddenbrooks (1923 film), a 1923 silent film directed by Gerhard Lamprecht
- The Buddenbrooks (1959 film), a 1959 drama film directed by Alfred Weidenmann
- Buddenbrooks (film), a 2008 drama film directed by Heinrich Breloer
- The Buddenbrooks (TV series), a 1979 drama television series
