= Landberg =

Landberg is a Swedish surname that may refer to

- Jayce Landberg, Swedish musician, composer, record producer, lyricist and novelist
- Stefan Landberg (born 1970), Swedish football coach and former midfielder
- Sven Landberg (1888–1962), Swedish gymnast and football player
