= Hertwig =

Hertwig is a German surname. Notable people with the surname include:

- Benjamin Hertwig, Canadian poet
- Craig Hertwig (1952–2012), American football player
- Michael Hertwig (born 1960), German football player and manager
- Oscar Hertwig (1849–1922), German zoologist
- Paula Hertwig (1889–1983), German biologist, politician
- Richard Hertwig (1850–1937), German zoologist

== See also ==
- Hertwig's sheath, a proliferation of epithelial cells
