= Emmanuel d'Hooghvorst =

Belgian writer

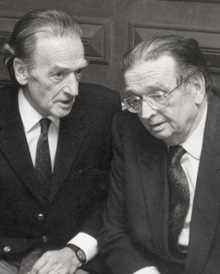
- Emmanuel (right) with his brother Charles
- Born: 1914
- Died: 1999 (aged 84–85)
- Occupation: Writer

Baron Emmanuel van der Linden d'Hooghvorst (1914–1999) was a Belgian writer, spagyric philosopher and alchemist.

He was a disciple of Louis Cattiaux.

== Biography ==
=== Childhood and youth ===
The eldest of a family of six children, son of Victor van der Linden d'Hooghvorst (1878–1942) and Marthe Descantons de Montblanc (1887–1978), Emmanuel d'Hooghvorst was born in Brussels on 30 April 1914.

He did his Greek-Latin humanities at Cardinal Mercier College in Braine-l’Alleud where he became a friend of the Russian-born future painter Nicolas de Staël. He then studied philosophy at the Catholic University of Louvain.

Nicolas de Staël described Emmanuel d’Hooghvorst as his best friend. In 1935 the two of them made a four-month trip to Spain: "They stay with the locals: Nicolas pays with drawings and Emmanuel by washing dishes."

D'Hooghvorst then spent a year in the Belgian Congo as a gold prospector. Perhaps this is where he became interested, if not in alchemy, at least in chrysopoeia.

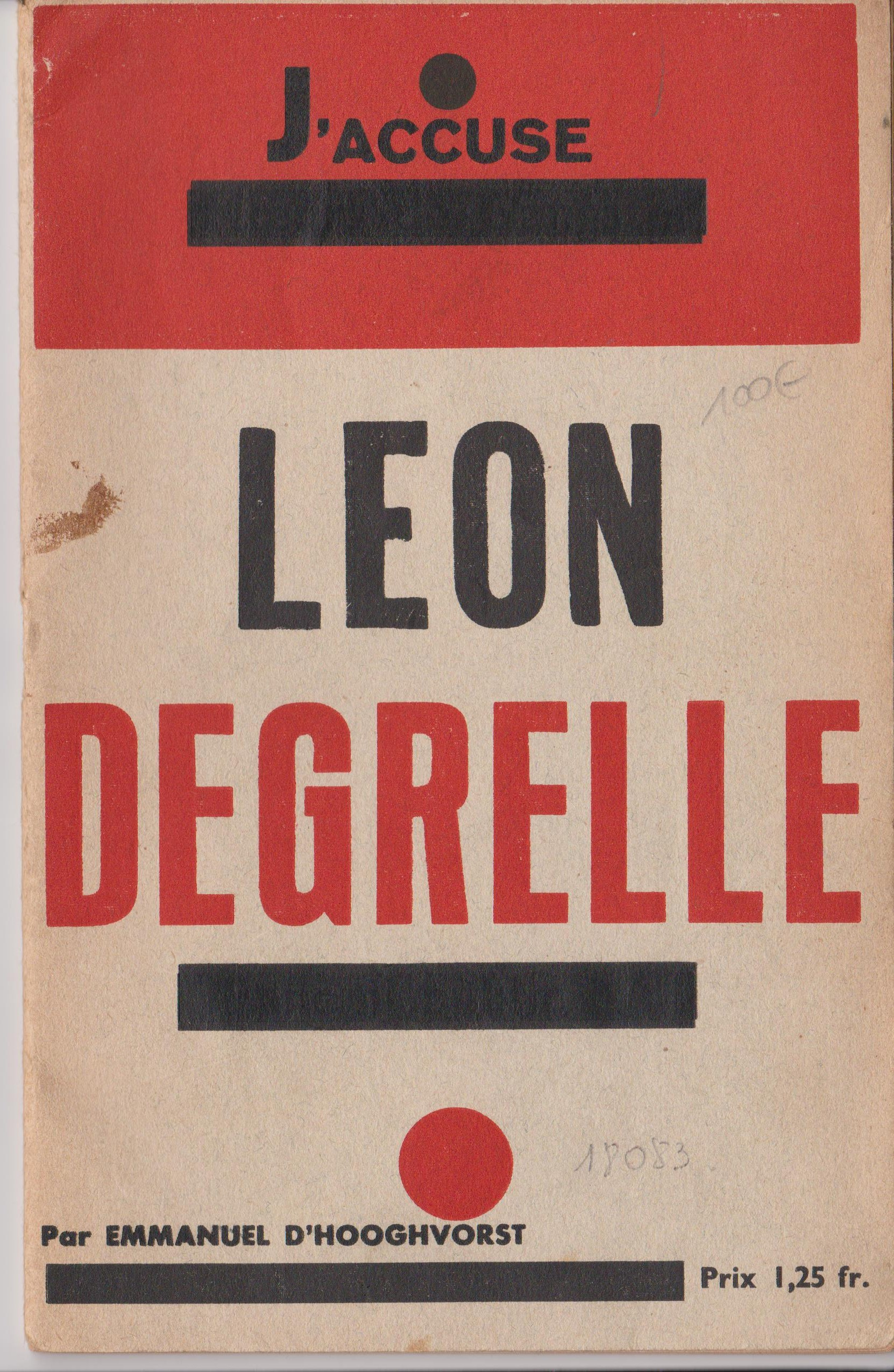
Manifesto against Léon Degrelle, written by Emmanuel d'Hooghvorst

In April 1936, as a Catholic member of the movement Action Nouvelle, he published a violent pamphlet against Léon Degrelle – J’accuse Léon Degrelle – intended to reveal the intentions of rexism. He wrote: "The rexist campaign is a terrible exploitation of popular credulity. However, the public must be aware of Rex’s leader’s true personality, of his latest intentions and of the means he uses to achieve them."

In 1939, he married Countess Elisabeth de Marnix de Sainte Aldegonde, who gave birth to four children.

=== Beginning of his hermetic research ===
Under the German occupation of Belgium in World War II, he was imprisoned twice by the Gestapo and then released. At that time he began to study classical literature in depth, especially Neoplatonism and Pythagorism. He often confessed later to his relatives that if he was not executed, as many of his friends involved in the Resistance were, it was because he had immersed himself in these studies.

In 1949, he discovered the Message retrouvé, the masterpiece of the Hermetic painter Louis Cattiaux (published in 1946 at the author's expense, with a preface by Lanza del Vasto) thanks to a criticism by René Guénon. In issue 270 of the journal Études Traditionnelles in 1948, Guénon defined it as a work of hermeticism that “deserves to be read and studied with care by all those who are interested in this particular aspect of tradition”.

This discovery led him to contact Louis Cattiaux by making an appointment at his home at 3, rue Casimir Périer in Paris, “sitting between his wife and his cat” as Lanza del Vasto nicely wrote in the above-mentioned Préface. Their first interview almost never took place: Emmanuel d’Hooghvorst showed up at Cattiaux's on time, apologising for not being able to receive him, as he had to go to a so-called “Board of Directors”; however, he allowed him to go, while waiting for his return, to grind coffee near his wife Henriette in the kitchen. When he returned, Cattiaux immediately addressed him: "Are you still there? You’re not too bad for a Belgian!" Charles d’Hooghvorst later wrote of Cattiaux: "Disconcerting, with unpredictable reactions, guided by a particular logic that caught his visitors off guard, he liked to shock and even scandalise, but always with humour."

This was the beginning of a friendship nourished by an intense epistolary relationship between Cattiaux and the two brothers, Emmanuel and Charles d'Hooghvorst. They sometimes wrote each other several letters a day. A good part of these voluminous written exchanges were published by Emmanuel d’Hooghvorst in an anthology in the Belgian review Le Fil d’Ariane (see below). He classified and titled them by theme (not chronologically) under the title of Florilège Cattésien. Professor Raimon Arola published the entire anthology in Castilian translation, first in 1999 in Tarragona, then in 2006 under the title Florilegio Epistolar, Reflejos de una busqueda alquímica (Epistolary anthology, reflections on an alchymical quest). Finally, this anthology again be published in French in 2006. In this fourth edition, Professor Arola states: "This relationship hides much more than it appears. We find an unusual and surprising story, like a miracle that occurred in the heart of the twentieth century." He also evokes "a friendship like those told in heroic epics in the past, which were at the origin of the great exploits performed by mortals with the help of the gods".

As for Lanza del Vasto, the first prefacer of Cattiaux's work, although he remained a friend of all three, he was more concerned about a social mission, which led him to the foundation of the Community of the Ark. Cattiaux, shortly before his death, wrote to Charles on 9 March 1953: "As for Lanza, you now understand the drama! It is Emmanuel and you who received the Message retrouvé that he did not want, and who present it in his place because he feared he would no longer be a master." However, this did not prevent Lanza del Vasto from remaining faithful and participating in Rhisnes (near Namur) in 1973, together with Emmanuel d'Hooghvorst, in a meeting devoted to the Message retrouvé in the home of Professor S. Feye who, at the time, tried to found a community based on the Community of the Ark.

Thus, as Didier Kahn points out, Cattiaux, like Fulcanelli and Eugène Canseliet, "also gave birth to a whole school around his disciples Charles and Emmanuel d'Hooghvorst".

The two brothers decided very early on to do everything possible to ensure that their friend's Message retrouvé was successfully reissued, and in its entirety this time. Indeed, in its first edition of 1946, the book contained only 12 chapters, divided into verses. However, Cattiaux continually amplified it until "book" 40 (new denomination of the old chapters) which he left unfinished at his unexpected death.

This publication had benefited from the reputation of Lanza del Vasto, which was constantly increasing. Indeed, the foundation in La Borie Noble (Hérault department) of the Community of the Ark, Lanza's numerous trips and conferences throughout the world, his struggle for non-violence in the mind of his master Gandhi, and especially his numerous publications, ensured a relative success for the Message retrouvé that Lanza prefaced. However, this preface, although skilfully written, is far from being Lanza del Vasto's best-known text. Many of Lanza's disciples are unaware of its existence. As for the praise of the Message retrouvé that René Guénon published (see above), it had a dark side: if it increased the audience in certain circles (metaphysicists, occultists, hermeticists, alchemists etc.), Guénon also aroused violent oppositions and had many enemies in both Catholic and esoteric circles. The question was of interest to Cattiaux who, during a long three-year correspondence with Guénon, tried to convince him to write an introduction to this future edition of the Message retrouvé. It is also in this letter that we can read the change of perspective that finally made Emmanuel d’Hooghvorst the presenter of the book: "As for knowing if your [Guénon's] name will do me good or harm in these circles, it is the least of my concerns, believe me. Emmanuel d'Hooghvorst found here something else that interested him more than all the lodges combined […]." In any case, René Guénon's death on January 7, 1951, ended the project.

=== Life as a Writer and Translator ===
In 1951, Emmanuel d'Hooghvorst wrote his first article on the Message retrouvé, published in Lausanne in issue 6 of the Swiss journal Les Cahiers trimestriels Inconnues. Already in issue 5 of this journal, he published the article entitled "Essai sur l'Art d'Alchymie". From the first page of this essay, Emmanuel d'Hooghvorst asked a fundamental question about the countless books on alchemy: "We can ask ourselves, however, when reading these books, whether we are dealing with charlatans hiding their ignorance under the appearance of pretentious jargon, or with sages jealously hiding their knowledge under the thorns of an obscure style in order to test the wisdom and constancy of the reader. Both hypotheses are true."

In July 1953, Cattiaux died suddenly. The two brothers were redoubling their efforts in their editorial decision. Already during their friend's lifetime, they distributed among their relatives booklets of verses from the Message retrouvé, typed and copied with a stencil. "When Louis Cattiaux died, the d’Hooghvorst brothers tried, by all means, to publish the complete edition of the Message retrouvé. In spring 1956, after long and costly negotiations, a full edition was published."

As early as 1954, Emmanuel d'Hooghvorst published an article in Volume 9 of the Swiss journal Inconnues: "Le Message prophétique de Louis Cattiaux".

In parallel with this desire to spread Cattiaux's work, Emmanuel d'Hooghvorst continued his in-depth studies of the original treatises on hermeticism and alchemy. Most of these were written in Greek or Latin, except a few such as the voluminous production of Paracelsus (most of whose treatises are in Middle High German) and the two volumes of Nicolas Salmon-Mangin de Richebourg's Bibliothèque des philosophes chimiques (in French). Being aware that the public of researchers was less and less trained in this cursive reading, he published in 1955, in issue 11 of Inconnues, his own French translation of Chapter IV of the Hydrolithus Sophicus seu Aquarium Sapientium (The Water Stone of Wisdom or the Aquarium of the Wise) attributed to Johann Ambrosius Siebmacher, an author who lived in Nuremberg and Augsburg in the seventeenth century. In his preface, he wrote: "Wanting to reach the secret of the Philosopher’s Stone, without divine blessing, is a dangerous folly; it would be equally vain, moreover, to seek to penetrate the books of the Hermetic Philosophers, the only true ones, without first resorting to the light of the Holy Scriptures, of which they are in a way the experimentation and the confirmation in the physical nature." It was also under his impetus that the book was published in 1989 in full by the publishing house La Table d’Émeraude in Paris, in Claude Froidebise's French translation: "It is [d'Hooghvorst] who proposed us to complete his work and who gave us all his help and corrected many passages that were too imprecise, giving the text back its meaning."

Eager to study the sacred scriptures of all nations, Emmanuel d'Hooghvorst decided to take classes with a Parisian rabbi, Joël Ashkenazi, professor of philosophy, in order to learn Hebrew and Aramaic; he also studied Arabic at the Université Libre de Bruxelles. In turn, he provided free classes to small groups of friends in Hebrew grammar, and then the texts of the Hebrew Kabbalah (excerpts from Ashlag's Zohar, Tishby's Mishnat Hazohar, Midrash Rabba, Midrash Hagadol, Talmud, etc.).

In 1958, he wrote an "Introduction à Eugène Philalèthe" (alias Thomas Vaughan) for the Traité du Ciel terrestre, which his friend Armand Deruyt had just translated for the journal Inconnues, making it a pioneering work. The book was published in two parts in 1958 and 1960. This introduction was reproduced as it stands by Clément Rosereau in his edition of Thomas Vaughan's Complete Works just a few days after the death of Emmanuel d’Hooghvorst. Before beginning his own preface, Clément Rosereau explains: “It was he who made us discover and love Thomas Vaughan and who, through his enlightened advice and benevolent patience, guided and helped us in this work of many years […]. Baron d’Hooghvorst was able to detect in Eugenius Philalethes an exceptional perfume, that of the last Adept that the West would have known.”

In 1977, the journal Le Fil d’Ariane, Écriture et tradition, dealing with religions and hermeticism, was founded by Jean-Marie d’Ansembourg. It regularly hosted articles by Emmanuel d’Hooghvorst. The same was true of the Spanish journal La Puerta, Retorno a las fuentes tradicionales. Emmanuel d’Hooghvorst also wrote in the French alchemical journal La Tourbe des Philosophes.

From 1975 until his death, Emmanuel d’Hooghvorst wrote numerous articles and sometimes gave lectures. In 1992, for example, he presented Les Cinq Livres ou La Clef du Secret des Secrets by Nicolas Valois in a style that some would describe as “inspired” and which, in any case, clearly changes tone, going from an academic style to a resolutely more poetic tone: “May this Saturn bind you to the pot if you have grasped this mercury that one cannot read without cooking it. This text has two sides, indeed, one of which is blessed; the other is merely a mask in which an idol is read. If you bind the study to your head, your gold will dissipate without profit: it is to toil that you must bind your reading…” This often mysterious and unusual style will be found here and there in most of his commentaries, and will culminate in his Aphorisms of the New World (see below).

Touching on seemingly disparate subjects such as Homer’s Odyssey, the Aeneid or the Bucolics of Virgil, the Tarot deck, Perrault’s Tales, Dante’s Divine Comedy, Ovid’s King Midas, and, of course, the texts of the Jewish Kabbalah and alchemical writings, he commented on them all, in his own words, in the hermetic sense based on a unique experience. These articles therefore take their place among the texts of Western hermeticism.

His distinctly “cabalistic” approach to Miguel de Cervantes’ novel Don Quixote inspired, for example, Pere Sánchez Ferré’s Cervantes’ study of Cervantes, subtitled Cábala y alquimia en el Quijote, which the author dedicates to Emmanuel d’Hooghvorst.

As for its influence on alchemical studies in particular, Raimon Arola highlights it in the introduction to his book Alquimia y religión: “This was the original intention of Baron d’Hooghvorst, which we will use as a starting point for our reflections.” The same author quotes extensively from the articles of E. d’Hooghvorst in his voluminous La Cábala y la alquimia. In her Trece Fábulas alquímicas, Luisa Vert pays homage to him in turn: “Emmanuel van der Linden d’Hooghvorst (1914–1999) was a profound connoisseur of Western spirituality, who devoted many of his essays to the art of alchemy. It was undoubtedly his writings that aroused my interest in this fascinating discipline.” In 2018, in his doctoral thesis entitled Mágica Belleza, the art historian Roger Ferrer Ventosa wrote: “On this idea [the corporification of the mind], d’Hooghvorst, lover of alchemy, remarked: ‘To give body and measure to immensity is the mystery of pure Art.’”

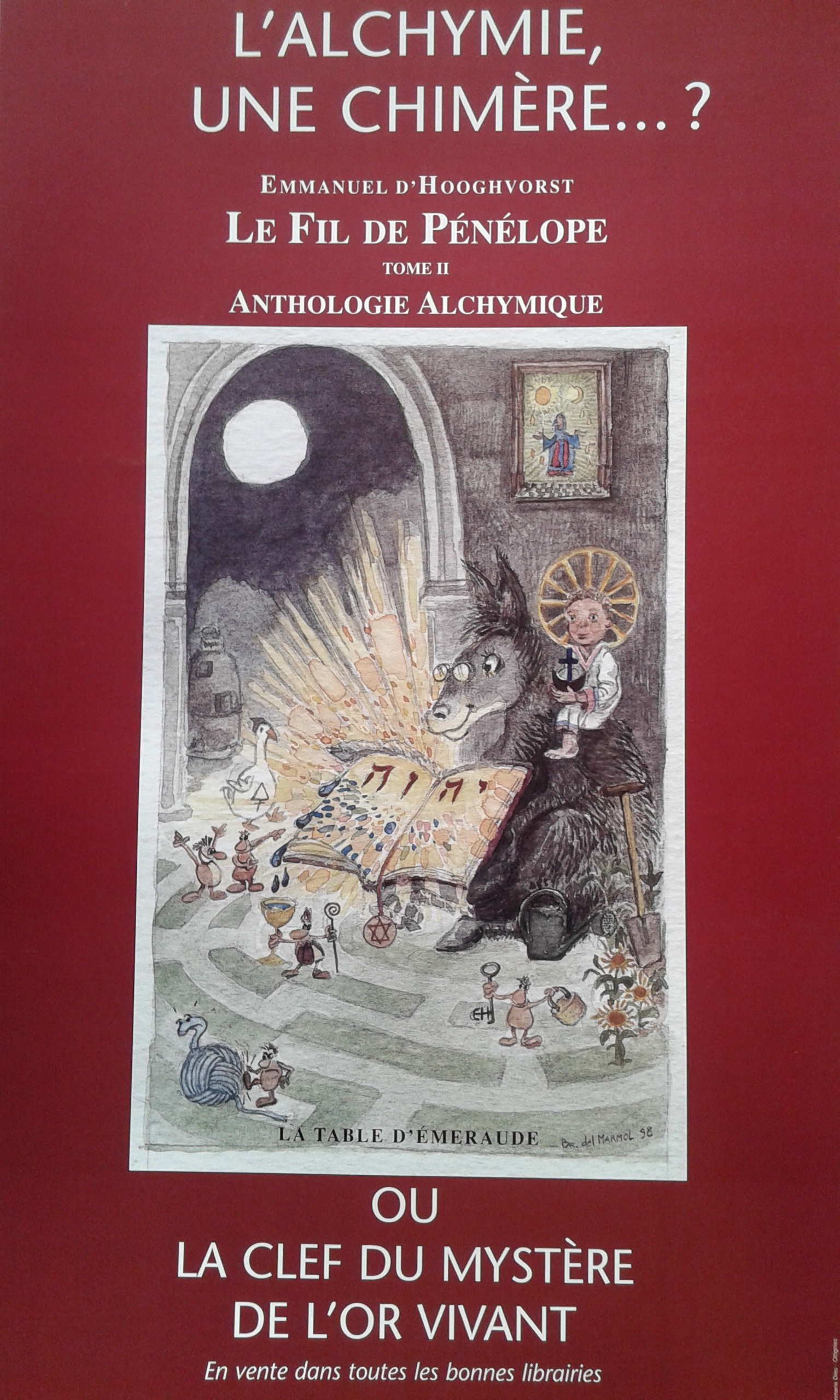
Poster announcing in 1998 the publication of Le Fil de Pénélope, volume 2.

Generally speaking, the influence exerted by these articles is such that, on the subject of “truths of a physical and metaphysical nature”, the philosopher Mohammed Taleb says: “These truths will be perceived throughout the centuries, from Plutarch (42–120) to Clement of Alexandria (150–220), from Michael Psellos (1018–1078) to Emmanuel d’Hooghvorst (1904–1999).”

“This was the patient quest of Baron d’Hooghvorst, a scholar in Ancient Letters, scrutinising the words of the Sacred and Wise Scriptures as if they were sealed boxes. Did he find the magical secret that unveils the secret of the buried Man? For it is indeed the mystery of Nature and Man that is at stake here, and not an external and speculative erudition.”

Emmanuel d’Hooghvorst was also in epistolary contact with personalities such as Henry Corbin, Roch Boulvin, Lanza del Vasto, José Gifreda, Georges Finet, Pere Ribot i Sunyer, Jean Mallinger, Gustave Lambert Brahy, Émile Dantinne, Marcel De Corte, Alexander von Bernus, Serge Mayassis, Jean-Pierre van Rij etc. In a letter to Bernard Chauvière, a disciple and friend of Eugène Canseliet, he wrote: “Yes, Canseliet was right to tell us that the imperious need to work was a kind of grace […]. For my part, I must still confess to you that I was set on the path of truth by my friend Louis Cattiaux.”

Just after delivering the manuscript of his last work, in the form of poetic sentences, entitled Les Aphorismes du Nouveau Monde, Emmanuel d’Hooghvorst died in Brussels on May 17, 1999, at the age of 85.

== Publications ==
- 1951: "Essai sur l'art d'alchymie", Inconnues 5, Lausanne.
- 1956: "Présentation au lecteur", in Le Message Retrouvé by Louis Cattiaux, Denoël. Numerous reprints and translations (more than 20) in English (The Message Rediscoverd, Beya 2005), Portuguese (A Mensagem Reencontrada, Madras, São Paulo 2005; Espiral Editora, Lisboa, 2018), Italian (Il Messaggio Ritrovato, Mediterranee, Roma 2002), Spanish (El Mensaje Reencontrado, Sirio, Malaga 1987), Catalan (El Missatge Retrobat, Arola Editors, Tarragona 2016), German (Die Wiedergefundene Botschaft, Herder. Basel 2010), etc.
- 1983: "Réflexions sur l’or des alchimistes", Revue Question De 51, January–March 1983
- 1996: "Chromis et Mnasylus in antro... (II)", translated by Stephanus Feye, Melissa 71, pp. 10–12.
- 1996: Le Fil de Pénélope, vol. 1. La Table d'Émeraude, Paris.
  - El Hilo de Penelope. Arola Editors, Tarragona, 2000.
- 1996-1997: "Le roi Midas (un conte alchimique)", in Le Fil d'Ariane 59–60.
- 1998: Le Fil de Pénélope, vol. 2. La Table d'Émeraude, Paris.
  - El Hilo de Penelope. Arola Editors, Tarragona, 2006.
- 1999: "Le roi Midas (un conte alchimique", in Ces hommes qui ont fait l'alchimie du XXe siècle, Grenoble, 1999, pp. 19–27 (with illustrations by Bruno del Marmol).
- 2000: « Présentation », dans Thomas Vaughan, Oeuvres complètes, traduites par Clément Rosereau, Paris, La Table d'Émeraude, 2000.
- 2008: "Les Aphorismes du Nouveau Monde" and "Le Roi Midas", in Le Miroir d'Isis ISBN 978-2-917485-01-9.
- 2009: Le Fil de Pénélope, expanded and corrected edition, vol. 1. Éditions Beya. ISBN 978-2-9600575-3-9.
- 2019: Le Fil de Pénélope, expanded and corrected edition, vol. 2. Éditions Beya. ISBN 978-2-930729-11-4.

== Articles ==
The articles were collected for the first time in 1996 under the title Le Fil de Pénélope, volume I, published by La Table d’Émeraude, Paris. The second volume was published in 1998. An expanded edition of Fil de Pénélope was published posthumously by Éditions Beya (vol. 1 in 2009 and vol. 2 in 2019).

== Bibliography ==
- Greilsamer, Laurent (1998). Le Prince foudroyé, La vie de Nicolas de Staël (in French). Paris: Fayard. ISBN 2-213-59552-6.
- Dubois, Geneviève, ed. (1999). Ces hommes qui ont fait l'alchimie du XXe siècle : Louis Cattiaux, Emmanuel d'Hooghvorst, José Gifreda, Henri Coton-Alvart, Henri La Croix-Haute, Roger Caro, Alphonse Jobert, Pierre Dujols de Valois, Fulcanelli, et Eugène Canseliet (in French). Grenoble: Geneviève Dubois Éditions. ISBN 2-84461-007-2.
- Feye, Stéphane (5 December 1999). Cabale et Alchimie, conférence sur Emmanuel d'Hooghvorst (in French). Paris, Sorbonne.
- L'Alchimie, Thème spécial : Le Colloque Canseliet, Arcadis Éditions, janvier à mars 2001, Revue trimestrielle, 10 rue de Vassieux, Amiens
- Arola, Raimon (2006). Creer lo increible o lo antiguo y lo nuevo en la Historia de las religiones, Étude historique et philosophique sur les idées et la spiritualité qui ont tissé l'amitié entre le peintre Louis Cattiaux et Emmanuel et Charles d'Hooghvorst (in Spanish). Tarragone: Arola Editors. ISBN 84-96639-06-1.
- Stéphane Feye, “Le Fil de Pénélope. Un support intéressant pour les ateliers philo, avec diverses interprétations proposées” in Diotime, revue internationale de didactique de la philosophie, April 2018, n°76
- Pere Sánchez, "La desaparición de un hermetista, Emmanuel d'Hooghvorst", Letra y Espiritu: Revista de Estudios Tradicionales 5, 1999
- Journal Arsgravis – Arte y Symbolismo – Universitat de Barcelona. Page dedicated to Emmanuel d'Hooghvorst's works
- Mercè Viladomiu, El sentido oculto de los Cuentos tradicionales. Explications des contes, essentiellement basées sur le sens hermétique inspiré de l'interprétation d'Emmanuel d'Hooghvorst : « Para la interpretación de estos cuentos, verdaderos tratados de alquimia, me he basado en la enseñanza de los hermanos d'Hooghvorst y Louis Cattiaux. La magnífica instrucción de Emmanuel d'Hooghvorst en su obra El hilo de Penélope, en la que comenta, entre otros textos, los “Cuentos de mi madre oca”, ha permanecido siempre a mi lado, como una guía que me ha llevado a descubrir aquello que se encontraba en estos relatos. » Barcelone, Ediciones Obelisco, 2006. ISBN 84-9777-308-X
- Jean-Pierre Giudicelli de Cressac Bachelerie, Pour la Rose Rouge et la Croix d'Or. Alchimie, hermétisme et ordres initiatiques, Grenoble, Le Mercure Dauphinois, 2007. ISBN 2913826865
- Taleb, Mohammed (2019). Les routes et lieux-dits de l'âme du monde. Introduction à une géographie symbolique, radicale et visionnaire (in French). Paris: Entrelacs. ISBN 979-10-90174-57-3.
- Chauvière, Bernard (2015). Aperçus alchimiques (in French). Marseille: Arqa. ISBN 978-2-7551-0078-5.
