= Josette Bournet =

French painter (1905–1962)

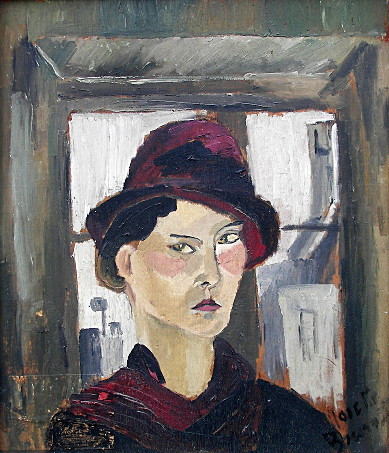
- Bournet, self-portrait
- Born: Josette Marguerite Téreille; 19 August 1905; Vichy, France
- Died: 12 February 1962 (aged 56); Nice, France
- Burial place: Châteldon cemetery
- Education: Arts décoratifs Académie de la Grande Chaumière
- Occupations: Painter, ceramicist
- Spouse(s): Louis Bournet; André Leca

Josette Bournet (1905 – 1962) was a French painter and ceramicist whose work was exhibited in Paris at the Salon d'Automne, Société des Artistes Indépendants and at the Salon des Tuileries.

== Biography ==
Josette Marguerite Téreille was born in Vichy, France, on 19 August 1905. She was the daughter of Philippe Téreille and Marie (known as “Marguerite”) Claussat, who were married on 8 February 1904, in Clermont-Ferrand.

Both of her grandmothers were from Châteldon, in Puy-de-Dôme. Her paternal grandfather, originally from Creuse, acquired the Hôtel du Beaujolais in Vichy, which Josette's parents operated. Her maternal grandfather, Joseph Claussat "senior" (1846–1910), was from Pont-du-Château. In 1872, he married Elisabeth Dassaud, the daughter of an innkeeper from Châteldon. In 1881, he was elected mayor of the commune and in 1883 general councilor of Puy-de-Dôme under the radical-socialist label. His son Joseph would occupy these same functions in 1907 and 1908.

Around 1919, Josette's family moved to Nice to manage two hotels, the Scribe and the Prince de Galles. Josette met Louis Bournet, whom she married in 1921 when she was 16 and they had a daughter in 1924. In 1925, the painter was invited by her sister Jeanne, then a student at the Arts décoratifs in Nice, to paint by the sea where the teacher, Jean Denisse, was enthusiastic about Josette's sketches. Soon, she joined the Arts Décoratifs.

In 1926, Josette and Louis Bournet separated and she went to Paris, leaving her daughter with her father. Josette took classes at the Académie de la Grande Chaumière, then in 1928 joined the Society of Sacred Works, directed by the painters Maurice Denis and George Desvallières. From 1929, she exhibited regularly at the Salon d'Automne, of which she became a member in 1935, at the Société des Artistes Indépendants and at the Salon des Tuileries.

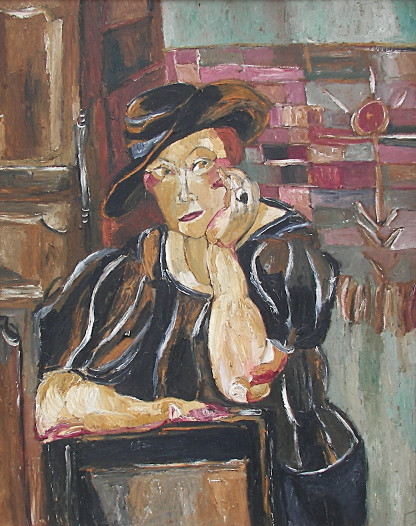
Bournet's portrait of Mela Muter

She divorced Louis Bournet and married André Leca in 1933; she had lived with him for several years. However, she continued to produce art using her first husband's surname. The couple rented a studio apartment in Paris at 19 Villa Seurat but moved frequently between Paris and Nice. In 1939, the Lecas had a son, François, who was born in Nice. During World War II, Josette and her husband were active in the resistance movement in the south of France.

Josette and André, both socialist activists, were very involved in the cultural life of their time, and befriended painters and writers and formed solid friendships that included: Hermine David, Louise Hervieu, Marcel Arland, Jean Follain, Athanase Apartis, Marcel Gromaire, Édouard Goerg, Maurice Mazo, Charles Vildrac and Mela Muter, some of whom had portraits painted by her.

André Leca died in 1952 at 46, and Josette Bournet died in Nice on 12 February 1962 at 56. They are buried in the Châteldon cemetery.

== Artwork ==
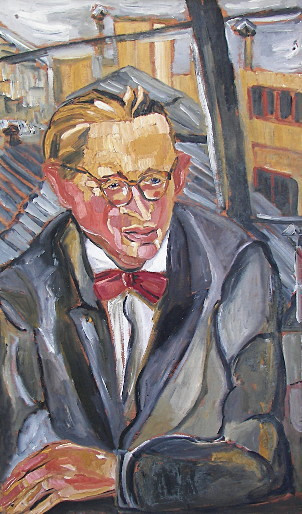
Poet Jean Follain

Bournet's work is figurative. She initially used oil on wood or canvas, then developed techniques of painting with glue on fiber cement, cardboard or wood, and painted with egg tempera on hardboard, cardboard or paper. From the end of the 1940s, she also produced works in clay and ceramics.

Josette Bournet's work includes many portraits of her relatives and friends, including many artists of her time, in particular Athanase Apartis, Luc Benoist, Emilie Charmy, Monique Desvallières, Jean Follain, Mateo Hernández, Jeannine Guillou (wife of Nicolas de Staël), Pierre Isorni, Mela Muter, André Salmon, Rossane Timotheeff-Lurçat and Charles Vildrac. Josette Bournet also painted a portrait of the Italian politician Pietro Nenni, at the end of the 1930s.

In addition to portraits, her work includes seascapes, painted in the regions around Nice, Brittany and Normandy, still lifes and religious works. Her compositions with a religious theme can be found in the church of Châteldon (Annonciation, 1953), in the church of Notre-Dame-du-Bon-Voyage in Nice (Annonciation, 1957; work first composed for the Saint-Paul seminary in Cannes), in the church of Saint-André-de-la-Roche (fresco, 1959) and in the church of Sainte-Bernadette des Garets in Vichy (Crucifixion and Pietà, 1961; works first composed for the church of Saint-Louis in Vichy).

== Retrospective exhibitions ==
- Clermont-Ferrand, 15 November - 24 December 2004, Hôtel du Département: Eclectic elegance
- Vichy, 57th Vernet Academy exhibition: 13 August - 18 September 2005: A quintessence of the figurative 20th century.
- Josette Bournet Museum: 2020–2021 exhibition, devoted to Bournet's early years of creation, between 1928 and 1938
