= Schempp =

Schempp may refer to:

- Ellery Schempp (born 1940), physicist noted for being the primary student involved in the Abington School District v. Schempp case
- Martin Schempp (1905–1984), German glider pilot and founder of Schempp-Hirth, a major manufacturer of gliders
- Simon Schempp (born 1988), German biathlete
- Theodore Schempp (1904–1988), American artist and art dealer

== See also ==
- Abington School District v. Schempp, 374 U.S. 203 (1963), United States Supreme Court case
- Schempp-Hirth, glider manufacturer based in Kirchheim unter Teck, Germany
