= Musicians (Stael) =

1953 painting by Nicolas de Staël

- Artist: Nicolas Staël
- Year: 1953
- Medium: Oil on canvas
- Dimensions: 162.2425 cm × 114.3 cm (63.8750 in × 45.0 in)
- Location: The Phillips Collection

Musicians is an oil painting by Nicolas de Staël, completed in 1953. It is currently on display at The Phillips Collection. Staël was inspired by a performance by jazz musician Sidney Bechet.
