= Ivan Staël von Holstein =

Baltic German officer (1798–1868)

- Иван Карлович Сталь-фон-Гольштейн
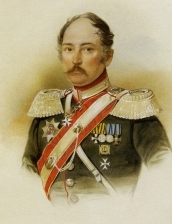
- Born: 10 June 1798; Kotzum manor, Governorate of Estonia (present-day Kuusalu Parish, Harju County, Estonia)
- Died: 11 October 1868 (aged 70); Saint Petersburg, Russian Empire
- Relatives: Vladimir Ivanovich Staël von Holstein (son)
- Military career
- Allegiance: Russian Empire
- Branch: Imperial Russian Army
- Service years: 1814–1868
- Rank: General of cavalry
- Commands: Life Guards Dragoon Regiment; 2nd Light Guards Cavalry Division; 6th Army Corps; 2nd Reserve Corps
- Conflicts: Russo-Turkish War, 1828–1829; November Uprising
- Awards: Order of Saint Alexander Nevsky; Order of the White Eagle; Order of Saint George, 4th class

Baron Ivan Karlovich Staël von Holstein (Russian: Иван Карлович Сталь-фон-Гольштейн; born Johann Alexander Freiherr Staël von Holstein; 10 June 1798 – 11 October 1868) was a Baltic German officer of the Imperial Russian Army who rose to general of cavalry and adjutant general. He fought in the Russo-Turkish War, 1828–1829 and in the suppression of the Polish November Uprising, commanded the Life Guards Dragoon Regiment and the 2nd Light Guards Cavalry Division, and from 1861 commanded the 6th Army Corps.

== Early life and career ==
Ivan Karlovich Staël von Holstein was born Johann Alexander Staël von Holstein on 10 June 1798 at Kotzum manor in the Governorate of Estonia (present-day Kuusalu Parish in Harju County), into a baronial family of the Estonian knighthood. In Russian service he was known by the Russified form Ivan Karlovich. He was educated privately.

He entered military service in 1814 in the horse artillery, and on 18 August 1816 was commissioned ensign in the 27th Horse Artillery Battery. In 1826, as a second lieutenant, he was appointed adjutant to the chief of artillery of the 2nd Army, Lieutenant General Karl Löwenstern, and was shortly afterwards promoted lieutenant.

== Russo-Turkish War and the Polish campaign ==
In 1828 and 1829 Staël von Holstein served in the campaign against the Ottomans on the Danube and in Bulgaria, and was present at Silistra, at Kulevcha and at Adrianople. For distinction in action he received the Order of Saint Anna, 3rd class with bow, and the Order of Saint Vladimir, 4th class with bow, and was promoted staff captain. In 1830 he transferred to the Guards Horse Artillery.

During the campaign of 1831 against the Polish insurgents he served under the chief of artillery of the active army, Prince Mikhail Gorchakov, and fought at Kuflew, Mińsk and Jędrzejów. He was promoted captain for distinction at Ostrołęka and colonel for distinction at the storming of Warsaw.

After the war he commanded No. 3 Battery of the 3rd Guards and Grenadier Artillery Brigade.

== Senior command ==
In 1836 Staël von Holstein was appointed commander of the 3rd Light Battery of the Life Guards Horse Artillery. On 30 August 1839 he was promoted major general and given the 2nd Brigade of the 1st Dragoon Division. From 24 August 1842 to 3 November 1847 he commanded the Life Guards Dragoon Regiment, after which he took the 1st Brigade of the 2nd Light Guards Cavalry Division. On 3 April 1849 he was promoted lieutenant general and appointed to head the 2nd Light Guards Cavalry Division.

On 25 September 1859 he was designated adjutant general to Tsar Alexander II. In 1861 he was appointed commander of the 6th Army Corps, and on 23 April 1861 promoted general of cavalry. He later commanded the 2nd Reserve Corps.

In August 1864 he was appointed a member of the Alexander Committee for the Wounded.

He died on 11 October 1868 in Saint Petersburg and was buried in the Nikolskoe Cemetery of the Alexander Nevsky Lavra.

== Family ==
In 1841 Staël von Holstein married Maria Karlovna Gerbel (1820–1895), a daughter of General Karl Gerbel. After her husband's death she lived permanently at Peterhof, where her house became a gathering place for the officers of the Uhlan regiments, and where her married daughters assembled with their families each summer.

The couple had six daughters and two sons:

- Maria (1842–1910), Countess Toulouse-Lautrec
- Elena (born 1843), Princess Gagarina
- Alexandra (1846–1922)
- Vera (born 1847)
- Sofia (born 1850), married Vladimir Alexandrovich Troynitsky
- Vladimir (1853–1921), lieutenant general, vice-commandant of the Peter and Paul Fortress
- Alexei (1859–1941), lieutenant general
- Elizaveta (1861–1920), married Nikolay Bobrikov, later Governor-General of Finland

== Honours ==
Russian orders:

- Order of Saint Anna, 3rd class with bow (1828)
- Order of Saint Vladimir, 4th class with bow (1829)
- Polish Sign of Distinction for Military Merit, 4th class (1831)
- Order of Saint Stanislaus, 2nd class (1833)
- Order of Saint Anna, 2nd class (1836)
- Order of Saint George, 4th class (1 December 1838, awarded for twenty-five years' blameless service in officer ranks; no. 5701 in the Grigorovich–Stepanov roll)
- Order of Saint Stanislaus, 1st class (1843)
- Order of Saint Anna, 1st class (1847)
- Order of Saint Vladimir, 2nd class (1851)
- Order of the White Eagle (1859)
- Order of Saint Alexander Nevsky (10 August 1864)

Foreign orders:

- (Kingdom of Prussia) Prussian Order of Saint John of Jerusalem (1838)
- (Kingdom of Prussia) Prussian Order of the Red Eagle, 2nd class with star (1851)
- (Austrian Empire) Austrian Order of the Iron Crown, 1st class (1853)
- (Kingdom of Prussia) Prussian Order of the Red Eagle, 1st class (1858)
