= Jean Follain =

French poet (1903–1971)

Jean Follain

Jean Follain (29 August 1903 – 10 March 1971) was a French writer, poet and corporate lawyer. In the early days of his career he was a member of the "Sagesse" group. Follain was a friend of Max Jacob, André Salmon, Jean Paulhan, Pierre Pussy, Armen Lubin, and Pierre Reverdy. He was a contributor to many journals, such as La Nouvelle Revue française, Commerce, Europe, Le Journal des Poètes and Les Cahiers des Saisons. In 1970, he was awarded the Grand Prize of Poetry from L'Académie française for his life's work. A small part of his archives is conserved at the Musée des Beaux-Arts de Saint-Lô in France. Prix littéraire Jean Follain de la Ville de Saint Lô is a literary award honouring his name and contributions to French literature. He studied law in Paris and became a judge. He died in 1971 in a car accident.

== Life ==
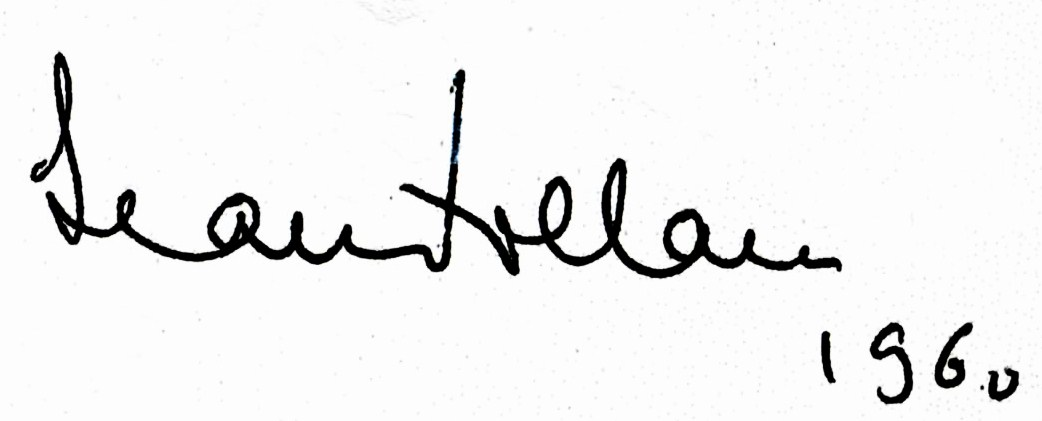
Signature of Jean Follain

Jean Follain was born in the small town of Canisy (province of la Manche), south of Saint-Lô, where he spent his childhood. He attended a middle school (Collège, the title of a later prose work) where his father was professor of the Natural Sciences. In 1919 he went to Leeds in a vain attempt to improve his English, and in 1921 he began studying law at Faculté de Caen. For health reasons he was exempted from military service.

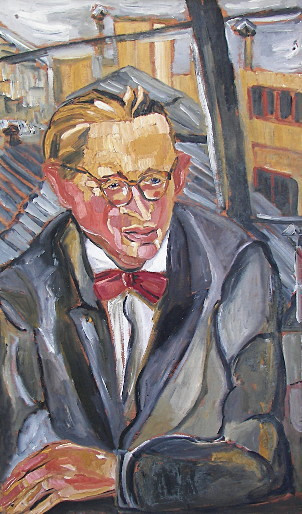
Jean Follain, portrait by Josette Bournet

In 1927 he passed his bar exams in Paris and started attending the meetings of the group "Sagesse" ("Wisdom") where he made the acquaintance of André Salmon, Pierre Reverdy, Pierre Mac Orlan and Max Jacob. In 1933 he published his first collection with Eugène Guillevic and Pierre Albert-Birot. In 1934 he married painter Madeleine Dinès, a daughter of the Nabi artist Maurice Denis. In 1939 he received the Mallarmé Prize. Jean Follain received the Prix Blumenthal in 1941, awarded to poets who refused to collaborate with the Vichy Government.

In 1951 he gave up his career as a business lawyer and was appointed to the post of judge (magistrate) of the High Court in Charleville. In 1949 he became a member of the Board of the "Pen Club". In 1957, he travelled to Thailand and Japan, and in 1958 he received the International Award of Capri. In 1960 he travelled to Brazil, Peru and Bolivia and in 1966 to the United States. He also visited Côte d'Ivoire and Senegal in 1967. He resigned from the bench in 1961, to participate in the cultural Decades of Cerisy-la-Salle, near Canisy. In 1970 he received the grand prize for poetry from L'Académie Française. He died in Paris on 10 March 1971 when, returning from a banquet given by the Boat Touring Club, he was run over by a car shortly after midnight at the outlet of the tunnel of the Quai des Tuileries. He was buried on 16 March in Canisy.

The "Reading Association at Saint-Lô" and the city of Saint-Lô, with the assistance of the Regional Direction of Cultural Affairs of the Lower Normandy Regional Centre of Letters and the General Council of France, organise a biannual literary prize in his name: Jean Follain Prize in the city of Saint-Lô.

== Poetry ==
- Usage du temps (1943)
- Exister (1947)
- Tout instant (1957)
- Appareil de la terre (1964)
- Transparence of the World (1969) (Copper Canyon Press, 2003) (translated and selected by W. S. Merwin)
- Espaces d'instants (1971)
- Death of the Ferret
- The Black Insect
- Habit
- Empire
- Face the Animal
- From Elsewhere (2014, The Gallery Press) (translated and selected by Ciaran Carson, plus poetic meditations by Carson on the subject poems)

== Prose ==
- Paris (1935)
- Canisy (1942)
- Chef-Lieu (1950)
- Transparence of the World
- D'Après Tout

== Awards ==
- Mallarmé Prize (1939)
- International Prize of Capri (1958)
- Grand Prize of Poetry (L'Académie française 1970)
- Prix Blumenthal (1941)
