= Vladimir Staël von Holstein =

Imperial Russian Army officer (1853–1921)

- Владимир Иванович Сталь фон Гольштейн
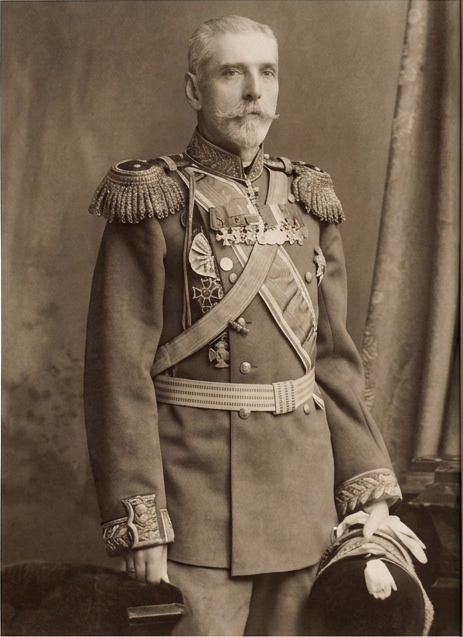
- Born: 29 June 1853; Saint Petersburg, Russian Empire
- Died: 21 September 1921 (aged 68); Ostrów Wielkopolski, Poland
- Relatives: Ivan Karlovich Staël von Holstein (father); Nicolas de Staël (son); Stephen Ujlaki (grandson)
- Military career
- Allegiance: Russian Empire
- Branch: Imperial Russian Army
- Service years: 1870–1917
- Rank: Lieutenant general
- Commands: 1st Infantry Reserve Brigade
- Conflicts: Russo-Turkish War (1877–1878); World War I
- Awards: Order of Saint Anna, 1st class Order of Saint Stanislaus, 1st class Order of Saint Vladimir, 2nd class Order of the White Eagle

Baron Vladimir Ivanovich Staël von Holstein (Russian: Владимир Иванович Сталь фон Гольштейн; 29 June 1853 – 21 September 1921) (Note: Dates relating to his service in Russia are given in the Julian calendar, as used by the Russian Empire until February 1918. His date of death, in Poland, is given in the Gregorian calendar.) was an Imperial Russian Army officer who reached the rank of lieutenant general. He spent most of his career on the staff of the Petersburg Military District and served as vice-commandant of the Peter and Paul Fortress from 1908. He commanded the fortress during the February Revolution.

== Background and early career ==
Vladimir Ivanovich Staël von Holstein was born in Saint Petersburg on 29 June 1853 into a Baltic German noble family. His father was General Ivan Karlovich Staël von Holstein (1798–1868), baptized Johann Alexander; his mother, Maria Karlovna (1820–1895), was a daughter of General Karl Gerbel. His brother Alexei Ivanovich Staël von Holstein also rose to lieutenant general.

He was educated at the Stavropol gymnasium and entered military service on 29 September 1870. He completed the Stavropol Cossack Junker School in 1873 and was commissioned ensign with seniority from 20 December 1872. On 15 August 1875 he transferred with the rank of cornet to Her Majesty's Life Guards Uhlan Regiment.

He took part in the Russo-Turkish War (1877–1878), for which he received three decorations in 1878.

== Staff service ==
Staël von Holstein was promoted lieutenant on 20 April 1880 and staff captain of cavalry (shtabs-rotmistr) on 30 August 1883. From 1887 he served on the staff of the Guards Corps and Saint Petersburg Military District, rising to senior adjutant, a post he held until 6 December 1904; he was promoted colonel on 6 December 1897. He was then assigned to the staff of the district's commander-in-chief. Promoted major general for distinction in 1905, he served in 1906 as general for special assignments to the commander-in-chief.

== Peter and Paul Fortress ==
On 5 July 1908 Staël von Holstein was appointed vice-commandant of the Saint Petersburg Fortress, better known as the Peter and Paul Fortress, whose Trubetskoy Bastion was the principal political prison in the last decades of tsarist rule. He was promoted lieutenant general for distinction, with seniority from 6 December 1911.

On 29 July 1914, at the outbreak of the First World War, he was given command of the 1st Infantry Reserve Brigade, but returned to the fortress on 16 September 1914.

During the February Revolution of 1917, as revolutionary crowds stormed the city's prisons, Staël von Holstein sealed the fortress. By the evening of 27 February it was under siege, the last imperial stronghold in the capital. The next day a delegation of deputies of the Provisional Committee of the State Duma was admitted through the Saint John Gate and received by the general in his office, where they demanded the release of the political prisoners. As insurgents occupied the ramparts and broke open the powder and munitions stores, several men were killed, and a soldiers' committee began to form among the garrison. When the soldiers' committee knocked on his door the next day, he had already left, disguised in civilian clothes. His children were smuggled out by carriage, and the family took refuge in his wife's family residence at 60 Nevsky Prospect.

In the following weeks the Trubetskoy Bastion was gradually filled with the ministers and high-ranking officials of the fallen regime. Staël von Holstein was formally discharged from the service on grounds of ill health on 15 April 1917.

== Exile and death ==
In spring 1919 the family was granted Estonian passports through the German consulate. They left Petrograd hidden aboard a freight train, taking with them the children's niania, Domna Trifonova. Stranded in Polotsk, in Red Army territory, they were searched by the Cheka on 3 September 1919. The baroness was briefly arrested, being released only through the intervention of Trifonova.

In early December 1919 they left Polotsk by sleigh, reaching Vilnius in January 1920, where they were taken in by Ludmila von Lubimov, a childhood friend of the baroness and wife of the former Governor of Vilna. From Vilnius they moved to Ostrów in Poland, where the baroness was appointed by the Red Cross to direct a school for refugee children.

The family lived in a tenement on Koszarowa Street, since demolished. By this time Staël von Holstein was completely paralyzed and was nursed by Trifonova. He died at Ostrów on 21 September 1921 and was buried with military honours in the military plot of the Evangelical-Augsburg cemetery on Grabowska Street, where he is recorded as grave 117, "rosyjski generał Władimir Iwanowicz baron Stael von Holstein" ("Russian general Vladimir Ivanovich Baron Stael von Holstein"). His widow died the following year, and the three surviving children were sent to Brussels, where they were raised by the Fricero family.

== Family ==
Staël von Holstein married first Olga Georgievna Sokhanskaya (16 July 1856 – 3 August 1909), a daughter of General G. D. Sokhansky. They had two sons, both of whom were killed in the First World War:

- Ivan (4 February 1889 – 7 July 1915)
- Vladimir (2 January 1895 – 9 November 1914)

After his first wife's death he married, in 1910, Lyubov Vladimirovna Berdnikova (1875–1922), a granddaughter of the publisher Ivan Ilyich Glazunov and cousin of the composer Alexander Glazunov. Their children were:

- Marina (1912–2005)
- Nikolai (5 January 1914 – 16 March 1955), who became a painter under the name Nicolas de Staël
- Olga (1916–2016)

== Honours ==
Russian orders:

- Order of Saint Anna, 4th class (1878)
- Order of Saint Anna, 3rd class with swords and bow (1878)
- Order of Saint Stanislaus, 3rd class with swords and bow (1878)
- Order of Saint Stanislaus, 2nd class (1884)
- Order of Saint Anna, 2nd class (1887)
- Order of Saint Vladimir, 4th class (1890)
- Order of Saint Vladimir, 3rd class (1900)
- Order of Saint Stanislaus, 1st class (1906)
- Order of Saint Anna, 1st class (1913)
- Order of Saint Vladimir, 2nd class (1915)
- Order of the White Eagle (1916)

Foreign orders:

- (Montenegro) Order of Prince Danilo I, 3rd class (1897)
- (France) Legion of Honour, Chevalier (1897)
- (Romania) Order of the Crown, Commander (1899)
