= Nicolas de Staël =

French painter (1914–1955)

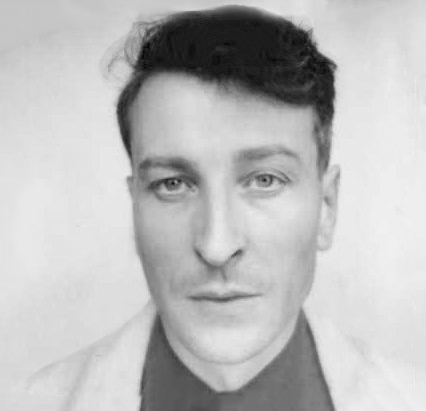
- Born: Nikolai Vladimirovich Staël von Holstein; 5 January 1914; Saint Petersburg, Russia
- Died: 16 March 1955 (aged 41); Antibes, France
- Education: Académie royale des beaux-arts de Bruxelles, Académie Moderne
- Known for: Painting, Drawing, Lithography, Engraving, Collage, Writing
- Spouse: Françoise Chapouton
- Partner: Jeannine Guillou
- Family: Staël von Holstein

Signature
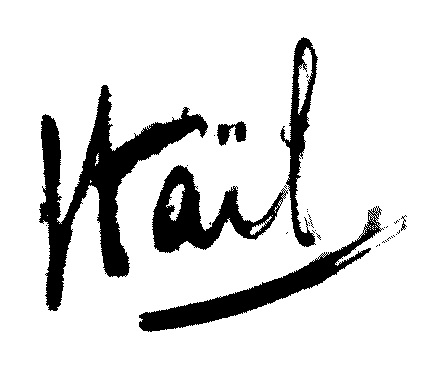

Nicolas de Staël (French: [ni.kɔ.la də stal]; 5 January 1914 – 16 March 1955), born Baron Nikolai Vladimirovich Staël von Holstein (Russian: Николай Владимирович Шталь фон Гольштейн), was a French painter of Russian origin widely regarded as one of the most important artists of the post-war period. In a career spanning just fifteen years, he produced over a thousand paintings marked by a constant evolution between abstraction and figuration, a rich use of color, and a distinctive engagement with light and texture. He also worked with lithography, engraving, collage, and drawing.

== Early life ==
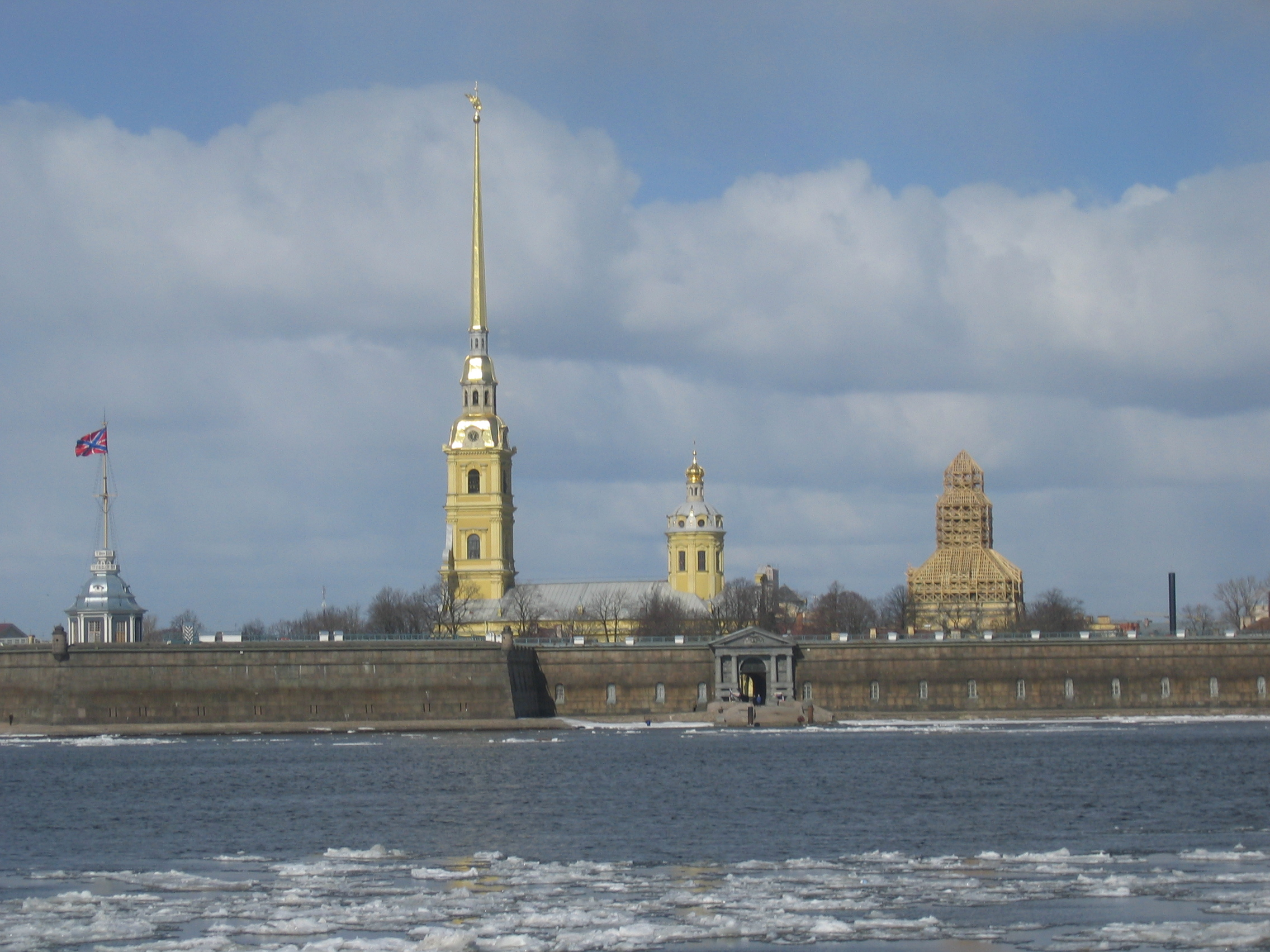
The Peter and Paul Fortress in Saint Petersburg, where Nicolas de Staël was born.

Nicolas de Staël was born on 5 January 1914, in Saint Petersburg into a family of military officers. His great-grandfather, Karl Gustav Staël von Holstein was a Baltic-German nobleman who served as a colonel in the Tsar's army; his grandfather Ivan Karlovich Staël von Holstein (1798–1868) rose to the rank of general of cavalry, serving as adjutant general to Tsar Alexander II and commanding the 2nd Cavalry Division; he was a recipient of the Order of St. George (1838), the Order of the White Eagle (1859), and the Order of St. Alexander Nevsky (1864). His father, Vladimir Ivanovich, served in the ranks of the Cossacks and the Uhlans of the Imperial Guard. He rose to the rank of lieutenant general and served as the last Imperial vice-commandant of the Peter and Paul Fortress in Saint Petersburg from 1908 to 1917. His wife Lubov Vladimirovna Berednikova was twenty-two years younger than her husband and came from a wealthy family with an interest in the arts; she was related to the composer Alexander Glazunov.

Like many White Russians, de Staël's family was forced into exile and left Saint Petersburg in the summer of 1919 because of the Russian Revolution. After a period of wandering, the family settled for a time in Vilnius in January 1920. His father died in 1921 and his mother the following year, after the family had moved to Poland. The orphaned Nicolas, his older sister Marina, and younger sister Olga were taken in by Ludmila von Lubimov, his mother's closest friend, who lived in France. She soon entrusted them with the Fricero family in Brussels, a wealthy family of Sardinian origin who had acquired Russian nationality in the nineteenth century when Emmanuel Fricero's father served as a naval attaché at the Russian embassy in London. His wife Charlotte was president of the Red Cross. They had already taken in the descendant of another prominent Russian family.

== Formation ==
De Staël was enrolled at the Jesuit Collège Saint-Michel in Etterbeek, near Brussels, in August 1924. He was an undisciplined student with poor marks and, after repeating a year, transferred to the Collège Cardinal Mercier in Braine-l'Alleud in September 1931. There he developed a passion for French literature and Greek tragedy, and began discovering painting in museums and galleries, particularly Rubens and the Belgian contemporaries James Ensor and Permeke. His adoptive father Emmanuel Fricero, a graduate of the École Centrale Paris, hoped Nicolas would pursue engineering, but upon finishing his studies the young man turned to painting.

After visiting the Netherlands in June 1933 and discovering Flemish painting, he entered the Académie Royale des Beaux-Arts in Brussels in October, where he studied classical drawing under Henri Van Haelen. He also enrolled at the Académie des Beaux-Arts de Saint-Gilles, where he took architecture courses and, from 1934 to 1935, decoration courses alongside Géo De Vlamynck, whom he assisted on the murals for the glass-art pavilion at the 1935 Brussels World's Fair.

He then traveled throughout Europe. In the south of France and in Paris, he discovered Paul Cézanne, Henri Matisse, Chaïm Soutine, and Georges Braque. He continued to Spain, which he crossed by bicycle with his friend Benoît Gilsoul, taking notes and sketches along the way; from Madrid, he traveled with Emmanuel d'Hooghvorst into Andalusia. In 1936 he exhibited Byzantine-style icons and watercolors at the Galerie Dietrich et Cie in Brussels.

== Morocco, Italy, Paris ==
In Marrakesh in 1937, de Staël met Jeannine Guillou, a Breton painter five years his senior from Concarneau, who was married to a Pole, Olek Teslar, and had a son, Antoine (who would later become a writer under the name Antoine Tudal). Jeannine was already an established painter; a critic in Fez had praised her "virile and nervous" talent in 1935. Nicolas, by contrast, was still searching for his style.

In 1938, he and Jeannine traveled through Italy: Naples, Frascati, Pompeii, Paestum, Sorrento, Capri. To the Friceros he wrote: "After trying to paint for a year in this marvelous Morocco, and not having emerged covered in laurels, I can approach, see, copy Titian, El Greco, the beautiful Primitives … and if sometimes these canvases are not as close to my heart as the old Flemish masters, the Dutch, Vermeer, Rembrandt, I always learn enormously from them."

That year, relations with the Friceros deteriorated; the family worried about his prospects, and Nicolas broke with Belgium, moving to Paris with Jeannine. He briefly attended the Académie Moderne of Fernand Léger and spent time copying works at the Louvre. He painted prolifically and destroyed much of what he produced; from this period only a view of the quai de la Seine survives.

In September 1939, de Staël enlisted in the French Foreign Legion. In the two months before his incorporation, he met the gallerist Jeanne Bucher, who found temporary lodgings for him and Jeannine in vacant artists' studios. Jeannine had already fallen seriously ill during the summer in Concarneau. It was during this period, through 1942, that Nicolas painted the greatest number of portraits of his companion in a figurative style, including Portrait de Jeannine.

== During the War ==
On 19 January 1940, de Staël was mobilized and assigned to the map service of the French Foreign Legion at Sidi Bel Abbès, Algeria, then transferred to the 1er Régiment étranger de cavalerie at Sousse, Tunisia, where he updated maps for the protectorate's geographic service. He was demobilized on 19 September 1940.

He rejoined Jeannine in Nice, where he met Alberto Magnelli, Maria Helena Vieira da Silva, Jean Arp, Sonia Delaunay, and Robert Delaunay. It was above all through his friend, the painter Félix Aublet, that de Staël entered these artistic circles and began orienting his work toward abstraction. Jeannine, meanwhile, had signed an exclusivity contract with a dealer on boulevard Masséna, which allowed the couple to survive as wartime food restrictions worsened.

On 22 February 1942, their daughter Anne was born. De Staël was fascinated by the child, whom he described as a "petit colosse aux yeux clairs" (little colossus with light eyes). The growing family also included Jeannine's son Antoine. The three years in Nice constituted de Staël's first real "studio" period: he began calling his paintings "compositions," drew and painted feverishly, and continued destroying as much as he created. By 1942 he was painting his first abstract canvases, with ellipses, lasso-forms, and grids animated on gray grounds.

In 1943, under the Nazi occupation, the family returned to Paris. Jeanne Bucher bought drawings from Nicolas and lent the family lodgings in the vacant hôtel particulier of architect Pierre Chareau, then in America. Through Magnelli, de Staël was introduced to César Domela, who persuaded Bucher to include him in a February 1944 exhibition alongside Domela and Wassily Kandinsky. Pablo Picasso, Georges Braque, André Lanskoy, and Jean Bazaine attended the opening, but no one bought de Staël's work.

Further exhibitions followed. At his first solo show at the Galerie l'Esquisse in May 1944, Braque expressed sincere admiration and the two painters began a close friendship that would prove one of the most important of de Staël's life. In April 1945, he had a solo exhibition at the Galerie Jeanne Bucher, and in May 1945 his work was included in the first Salon de Mai and the Salon d'Automne. By 1945 his exhibitions brought critical recognition, but it came too late for Jeannine, who was gravely ill. On 20 February 1946, she was admitted to the Hôpital Baudelocque for a therapeutic abortion; she died on 27 February, weakened by years of malnutrition.

== Post-war recognition (1946–1951) ==
A few months after Jeannine's death, de Staël married Françoise Chapouton, whom the couple had hired at the age of nineteen to care for Anne and Antoine. In October 1946, through his friendship with the painter André Lanskoy, de Staël signed a contract with the dealer Louis Carré, who agreed to buy all his output.

In January 1947, the family moved to a large studio at 7, rue Gauguet, near the Parc Montsouris. The space was high-ceilinged and luminous, and its light helped brighten the painter's palette. The studio was close to that of Georges Braque, and the two painters became close friends; de Staël visited Braque regularly in Paris and at Varengeville-sur-Mer, and their artistic exchange would prove significant for both. In the same building, de Staël met the American private art dealer Theodore Schempp, who began introducing his work to collectors in the United States.

His second daughter Laurence was born in April 1947 and his son Jérôme in April 1948. That same month, de Staël obtained French citizenship.

Dissatisfied with Louis Carré's methods, de Staël moved to the gallery of Jacques Dubourg on the boulevard Haussmann, who would remain his most faithful dealer and personal supporter throughout his life. Between 1947 and 1949, de Staël's palette lightened considerably. The dense, somber compositions of the immediate post-war years gave way to works in pastel grays and silvers, notably Hommage à Piranese (1948) and Jour de fête (1949), in which the impasto grew richer and the color more delicate. He refused to align himself with any movement, and when the Musée national d'art moderne in Paris acquired Composition (les pinceaux) in March 1950, he insisted on being hung apart from the abstract group.

By 1950, de Staël was attracting international attention. Schempp sold works to important collectors including Duncan Phillips of the Phillips Collection. Leo Castelli included him in a group exhibition at the Sidney Janis Gallery in New York. His work entered the collection of the Museum of Modern Art in 1951. That year also saw the beginning of his friendship with the poet René Char, introduced through the critic Georges Duthuit; de Staël and Char collaborated on Poèmes de René Char, bois de Nicolas de Staël, published in 1951 with woodcuts by the painter.

== The explosive years (1952–1953) ==
The year 1952 was one of de Staël's most prolific, producing more than 240 paintings. It began with a disappointing exhibition at the Matthiesen Gallery in London, where the British critics largely failed to respond to his work, with the exception of John Russell and Denys Sutton.

A decisive new subject arrived on 26 March 1952, when de Staël attended the France–Sweden football match at the Parc des Princes with his wife. The experience triggered a series of paintings, Les Footballeurs, executed in vivid colors across formats ranging from small oil-on-cardboard sketches to the monumental Le Parc des Princes (200 × 350 cm), for which he used wide spatulas and a fifty-centimeter sheet of metal to build up the colors on the canvas.

When he exhibited Le Parc des Princes at the Salon de Mai, the reaction was hostile. The painting was read as a figurative manifesto, and partisans of abstraction accused de Staël of betrayal; like Jean Arp and Jean Hélion before him, he was denounced for abandoning abstract research. De Staël responded in a published questionnaire: "I do not set abstract painting against figurative painting. A painting should be at once abstract and figurative: abstract as a wall, figurative as the representation of a space."

In March 1953, de Staël had his first major New York exhibition at M. Knoedler & Co., which was both a commercial and critical success. He also exhibited at the Phillips Collection in Washington, which acquired two more of his canvases. During a visit to the United States that year, he and Françoise went to the MoMA and the Barnes Foundation in Merion, Pennsylvania.

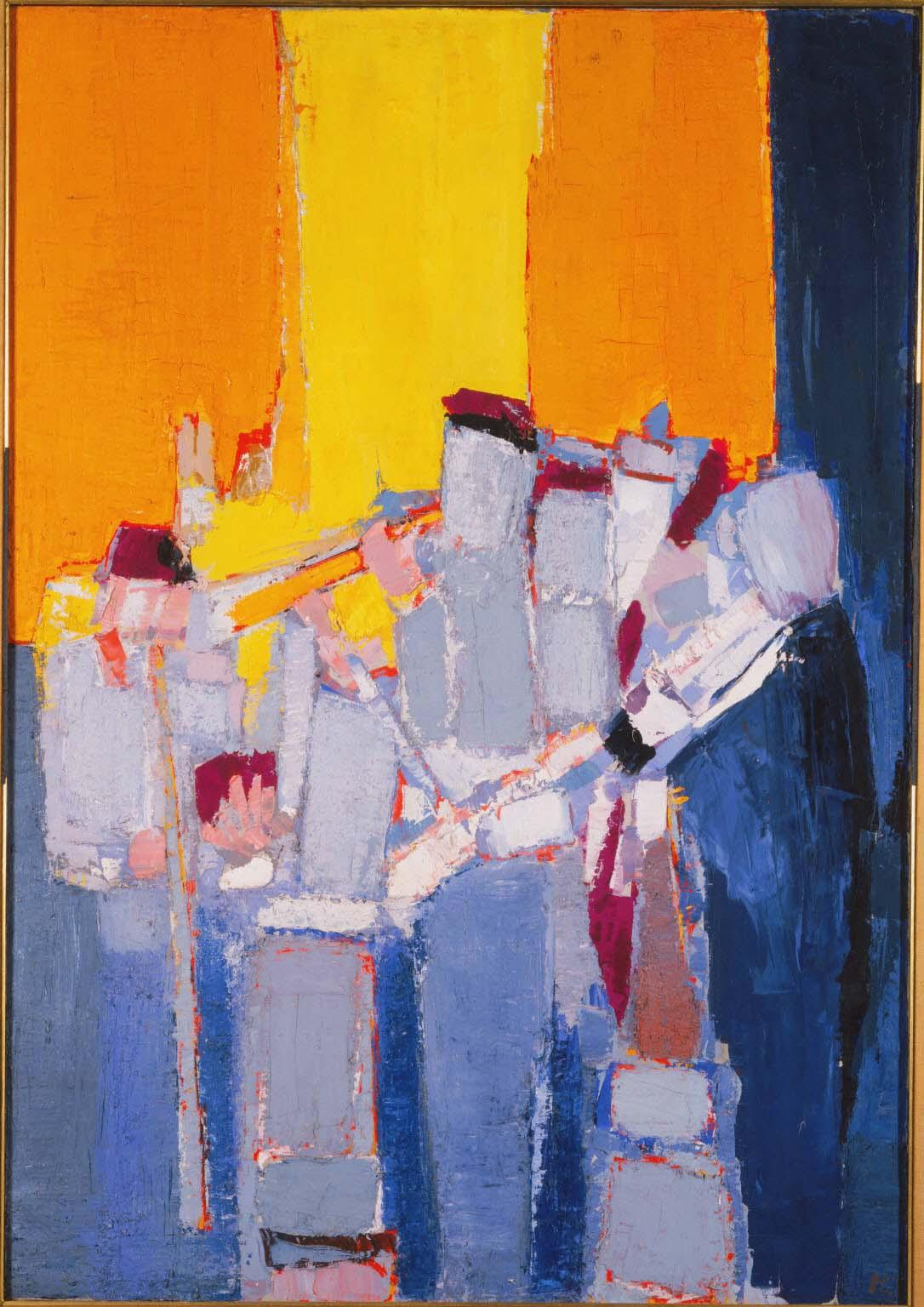
Les Musiciens, souvenir de Sidney Bechet, 1953

The New York gallerist Paul Rosenberg, who had previously represented Picasso, Braque, Léger, and Matisse, offered de Staël an exclusive contract. De Staël accepted, pleased to be in such company. Among those who saw his work at Rosenberg's gallery was the diplomat and novelist Romain Gary, who wrote to de Staël: "You are the only modern painter who gives genius to the spectator."

A new source of inspiration arrived in May 1953, when de Staël attended a concert at the salon of Suzanne Tézenas and discovered what he called the "colors of sounds." He heard works by Pierre Boulez, Olivier Messiaen, and Isaac Albéniz, and developed a passion for contemporary music and jazz, particularly for Sidney Bechet. These experiences produced Les Musiciens, souvenir de Sidney Bechet (two versions, one now at the Centre Pompidou, the other at the Phillips Collection) and the monumental L'Orchestre.

That summer, he rented a magnanerie near Avignon at Lagnes, where the Provençal light pushed his palette toward brilliant, saturated color. He then took his family to Italy and Sicily, where the landscapes around Agrigento inspired some of his most celebrated canvases. He purchased a house, the Castelet, in Ménerbes, and continued to supply Rosenberg at an extraordinary pace, prompting the dealer to caution him that collectors might be frightened by such rapid production.

== Antibes and final works (1954–1955) ==
Rosenberg's New York exhibition of 8 February 1954, featuring the paintings from Ménerbes and Sicily, was a major commercial success. De Staël's fourth child, Gustave, was born on 3 April 1954. That spring, a successful exhibition at Jacques Dubourg's gallery in Paris confirmed his new direction: a return to figuration through still life, landscape, and the human figure.

From 1953, de Staël had become involved with Jeanne Polge (née Mathieu), a married woman living near Nice, who inspired a series of nude paintings including Nu debout and Nu couché. In late 1954, seeking to be closer to her, he took an apartment in Antibes where he installed his studio and lived alone; he and Françoise separated that autumn.

Working with renewed intensity, de Staël shifted his technique. Instead of thick impasto, he began diluting his colors, applying them with cotton and gauze rather than knife and spatula. Marines became his preferred subject. In early March 1955, a visit to Paris brought fresh inspiration: he attended concerts at the Théâtre Marigny, heard a lecture by Pierre Boulez, and returned to Antibes to paint his musical impressions. On a six-meter chassis he began Le Concert (350 × 600 cm), his last painting. In his final period at Antibes he produced more than 350 works.

== Death ==
Maison Nicolas de Staël, Antibes

De Staël was increasingly isolated and in distress. He suffered from exhaustion, insomnia, and depression. His relationship with Polge had grown strained; she became distant in his final weeks. On March 16, 1955, de Staël left his studio, climbed to the terrace of the building, and jumped to his death. He was 41 years old.

He had written a final letter to Jacques Dubourg, attending to practical matters before closing: "I haven't the strength to finish my paintings. Thank you for all you have done for me. With all my heart." His very last letter was addressed to his daughter Anne, who was then thirteen.

The building in Antibes where he died was classified a French historical monument in 2014. He is buried at the Montrouge Cemetery.

== Legacy ==
De Staël's career spanned roughly fifteen years and produced more than a thousand paintings, along with numerous drawings, engravings, lithographs, and collages. His work reflects the influence of Paul Cézanne, Henri Matisse, Vincent van Gogh, Georges Braque, Chaïm Soutine, and the Fauves, as well as the Dutch masters Rembrandt, Vermeer, and Hercules Seghers.

His painting is marked by constant evolution. From the dark, dense compositions of the mid-1940s (Porte sans porte, 1946; Ressentiment, 1947), he moved toward an exaltation of color, culminating in works such as Grand Nu orange (1953). His canvases are characterized by thick layers of superimposed paint and a sustained engagement with texture, ranging from heavy knife-applied impasto in the Compositions of 1945 to 1949, to the fluid, diluted pigments of his final works (Agrigente, 1954; Chemin de fer au bord de la mer, soleil couchant, 1955).

His "reinvention of figuration," beginning with Le Parc des Princes and Les Footballeurs in 1952, was poorly understood at the time but anticipated the broader evolution of post-war art by nearly two decades. He had recovered the visible world without renouncing the expressive possibilities and freedom of action that defined contemporary painting. A similar path from abstraction toward figuration can be traced in the work of the CoBrA group, the British painter Alan Davie, and, in the United States, the Bay Area Figurative Movement, whose painters made a comparable return to imagery in the mid-1950s.

De Staël's influence extended to subsequent generations of abstract painters. According to Marcelin Pleynet and Michel Seuphor, the new movements of abstraction from the 1970s onward followed de Staël's path, "abandoning gestural painting for a brushed, even masonry-like painting." Joan Mitchell, while claiming Claude Monet as her primary influence, worked in a manner close to de Staël's, notably in her use of broad flat planes of color. Much of de Staël's late work, in particular the thinned and diluted landscapes of 1954 to 1955, anticipated Color Field painting and Lyrical Abstraction of the 1960s and 1970s.

The Dictionnaire de la peinture summarized his place in art history: "Staël was the most powerful creator of his generation in the post-war School of Paris, over which he exercised a strong influence. He was the first to transcend the antinomy of abstraction and figuration."

=== Reputation and market ===
De Staël occupies a singular position in the history of post-war European painting. In France, he is regarded as a major figure of twentieth-century art; the 2023 retrospective at the Musée d'Art Moderne de Paris drew over 409,000 visitors, a historic attendance record for the museum, surpassing the previous record set by a Jean-Michel Basquiat exhibition in 2010. At auction, his work commands prices among the highest for any post-war European painter. Despite this, and despite the strong presence of his work in American museum and private collections since the 1950s, de Staël remains less widely known in the English-speaking world than many of his contemporaries.

=== Reception and exhibitions ===
Paradoxically, it was in the United States, where de Staël is now least celebrated, that he first found his largest commercial audience. In the year following his death, solo exhibitions were held exclusively at American institutions, including the Museum of Fine Arts, Houston, the Phillips Collection in Washington, and the Rockefeller Center in New York, among others. Most of his work from the 1953 to 1955 period had been sold in New York, principally through Rosenberg and Schempp.

In France, the first major retrospective took place at the Palais de Tokyo in February 1956, with a catalog by Jean Cassou, Françoise de Staël, and Pierre Lecuire. Subsequent retrospectives were held at the Grand Palais (1981), the Centre Pompidou and the Hermitage Museum (both 2003), and the Fondation Maeght (1991), with regular exhibitions at the Fondation Gianadda in Martigny.

In 2023, the Musée d'Art Moderne de Paris mounted a major retrospective of approximately 200 paintings, drawings, engravings, and notebooks, curated by Charlotte Barat-Mabille and Pierre Wat. The exhibition sold out entirely and was subsequently presented at the Fondation de l'Hermitage in Lausanne.

=== In cinema ===
Jean-Luc Godard considered de Staël the painter "who went the furthest," and made numerous allusions to his work in his films. In Pierrot le Fou (1965), the use of primary colors was strongly influenced by de Staël's painting, and the film's trailer described it as "the story of the painter Nicolas de Staël and of his suicide."

== See also ==
- Tachisme
- Lyrical Abstraction
- Art Informel
- Color Field painting

== Sources ==
=== Principal references ===
- Ameline, Jean-Paul (2003). Nicolas de Staël. Classiques du XXe siècle (in French). Centre Pompidou. ISBN 2-84426-158-2. Exhibition catalog, Centre Pompidou, 12 March – 30 June 2003.
- Barat, Charlotte; Wat, Pierre (2023). Nicolas de Staël (in French). Paris-Musées / Musée d'Art Moderne de Paris. ISBN 978-2-7596-0555-2. Exhibition catalog, Musée d'Art Moderne de Paris, 15 September 2023 – 21 January 2024.
- Chastel, André; de Staël, Françoise; Dubourg, Jacques (1968). Staël, lettres et catalogue raisonné de ses peintures 1934–1955 (in French). Le Temps. p. 407.
- Cooper, Douglas (1961). Nicolas de Staël, Masters and Movements. London: Weidenfeld and Nicolson.
- Dobbels, Daniel (1994). Staël (in French). Paris: Hazan. ISBN 2-85025-350-2.
- du Bouchet, Marie (2003). Nicolas de Staël: une illumination sans précédent. Découvertes Gallimard (in French). Gallimard. ISBN 2-07-076797-3.
- Greilsamer, Laurent (2001). Le Prince foudroyé: la vie de Nicolas de Staël (in French). Paris: Fayard. ISBN 2-213-59552-6.
- Marcadé, Jean-Claude (2012). Nicolas de Staël: peintures et dessins (in French). Paris: Hazan. ISBN 978-2-7541-0116-5.
- Nicolas de Staël: paintings 1950–1955. New York: Mitchell-Innes & Nash. 1997. ISBN 0-9660769-1-5. Exhibition catalog.
- Prat, Jean-Louis; Bellet, Harry (1995). Nicolas de Staël (in French). Martigny: Fondation Gianadda. ISBN 2-88443-033-4. Exhibition catalog, Fondation Gianadda, 19 May – 5 November 1995. With letters of the painter commented by Germain Viatte.
- Prat, Jean-Louis; Augais, Thomas; de Staël, Anne; du Bouchet, André (2010). Nicolas de Staël 1945–1955 (in French). Martigny: Fondation Gianadda. Exhibition catalog.
- de Staël, Anne (2001). Staël, du trait à la couleur (in French). Paris: Imprimerie nationale. ISBN 2-7433-0404-9.
- de Staël, Françoise (1997). Nicolas de Staël: catalogue raisonné de l'œuvre peint (in French). Neuchâtel: Ides et Calendes. ISBN 2-8258-0054-6.

=== Supplementary works ===
- Daval, Jean-Luc (1988). Histoire de la peinture abstraite (in French). Paris: Hazan. ISBN 978-2-85025-166-5.
- Lambert, Stéphane (2023). Nicolas de Staël, la peinture comme un feu (in French). Gallimard. ISBN 978-2-07-302468-8.
- Laclotte, Michel; Cuzin, Jean-Pierre (1987). Dictionnaire de la peinture occidentale du Moyen Âge à nos jours (in French). Paris: Larousse. ISBN 978-2-03-511341-2.
- Pleynet, Marcelin; Ragon, Michel (1988). L'art abstrait (in French). Vol. 5. Paris: Maeght. ISBN 2-86941-005-0.
- Char, René (2010). Correspondance 1951–1954 (in French). Éditions des Busclats. Correspondence between René Char and Nicolas de Staël.
