= Mela Muter =

Polish painter (1876–1967)

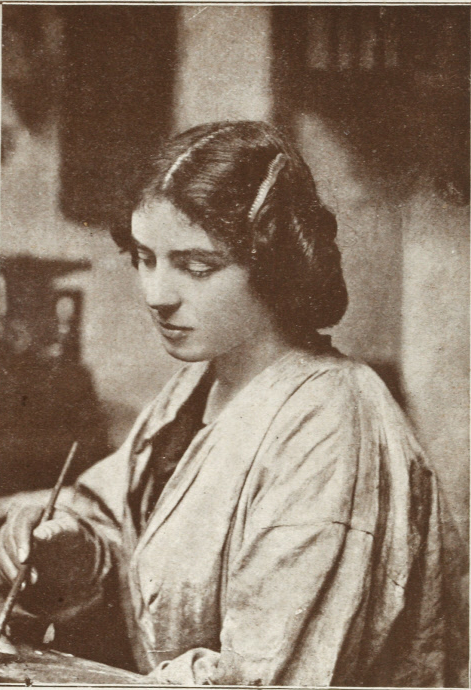
Mela Muttermilch. Photograph published in the magazine Feminal on June 25, 1911.

Mela Muter is the pseudonym used by Maria Melania Mutermilch (April 26, 1876 – May 14, 1967), the first professional Polish painter of Jewish descent. She lived most of her life in France. Muter's painting career began to flourish after she moved to Paris from Poland in 1901 at the age of twenty-five. Before World War I, Muter's painting practice aligned itself with the Naturalism movement; her signature works containing vivid hues and strong brush strokes. Muter gained swift popularity in Paris and within five years of her residency in the city, had already begun showing her works. Muter received French citizenship in 1927. After the breakout of WWII Muter fled to Avignon for safety during the Nazi occupation. After the war, Muter returned to Paris where she worked and resided until her death in 1967.

== Life and career ==
=== Early life ===
Before Mela Muter took on her pseudonym, she was born Maria Melania Klingsland. Maria's family was living in Warsaw in Poland enjoyed a role amongst the social elites of Warsaw. Muter's father, Fabian Klingsland, was a supporter of the arts and cultures. The Klingsland family was financially generous and morally well-read, both are factors that would be reflected in Mela's artistic sensibilities. Muter's parents had Mela enrolled in lessons for both piano and drawing by the age of 16. Mela had three siblings: one brother and two sisters. Her younger brother, Zygmunt Klingsland, having also felt the affects the role of culture held in the family, went on to become an art critic and diplomat for the Polish Embassy in Paris.

The family's status allowed Mela to expand her artistic interests. At the age of twenty three, she married Michal Mutermilch. Michal had a membership with the Polish Socialist Party and enjoyed a career as an art critic and writer. In 1900, Maria and Michal welcomed their first and only child, Andrzej. Maria continued her artistic studies at the School of Drawing and Painting for Women. Muter's early work was marked by a symbolic style that spoke to the ideals of landscape and portraiture. Even at this stage, her work demonstrated a reflective quality that negated strictly representational boundaries.

=== Muter in Paris ===
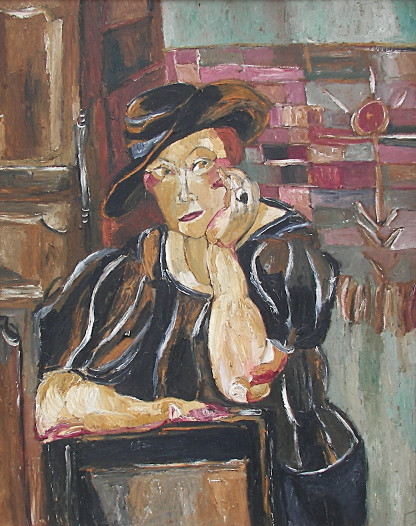
Mela Muter painted by Josette Bournet

In 1901 Mela, accompanied by her husband and son, moved to Paris. Muter continued her studies at the Académie Colarossi and the Académie de la Grande Chaumière. In 1902, she began exhibiting her work at the Paris Salon. She took part in exhibitions at the Salon des Indépendants, the Société Nationale des Beaux-Arts, the Salon des Tuileries and the Salon des Femmes Artistes Modernes, as well as exhibiting her work in Poland. Muter was a popular portrait painter in Paris. She also contributed illustrations to the French magazine Clarté. Muter was one of the first members of the group of artists known as the School of Paris.

In the decade after leaving Warsaw, Muter and her family travelled all over Western Europe. It was through these travels that Muter's focus shifted away from the landscapes she saw and onto the people who inhabited them.

=== Loss and war time ===
While her husband Michal was away during the first world war, Mela had an affair with French writer and political activist Raymond Lefebvre that led to her divorce from her husband. After receiving a religious divorce from her former husband, Mela cared for and resided with Raymond. After taking up his political ideals, Muter began producing pacifist artworks for the local socialist magazine, Clarte. Lefebvre would later die in 1920 under mysterious circumstances on a trip to Russia.

Mela became interested in Christianity and was baptized in 1923. Muter also lost her only child to his battle with bone tuberculosis in December 1924. She was also saddened by the death of her friend Rainer Maria Rilke.

Muter became a French citizen in 1927. She became a member of the Société Nationale des Beaux-Arts and the Société des Femmes Artistes Modernes. During the German occupation of France during World War II, Muter hid in the south of France. For a time, she was unable to paint because of progressive loss of sight. A retrospective of her work was presented in Paris in 1953. She had cataract surgery in 1965, returned to painting and presented works in Cologne, Paris and New York City.

Muter died in her studio in Paris at the age of 91. Muter was buried in the Cimetière parisien de Bagneux.

== Artistic style and ideals ==
In the early ages of Muter's work, she could be classified with the post-impressionists due to the pattern and application of her paint. In style and application of paint, Vincent Van Gogh can be seen as a clear influence on Muter's earlier work. By her early thirties, Muter's painting style was distinguished with heavy brushstrokes that layered paint around the faces and hands of the people she painted to signify areas of importance. In her full adulthood, Muter's work had ties with the expressionist movement, marked by a brighter color palette and more pointed compositions, often leaving areas of the canvas bare.

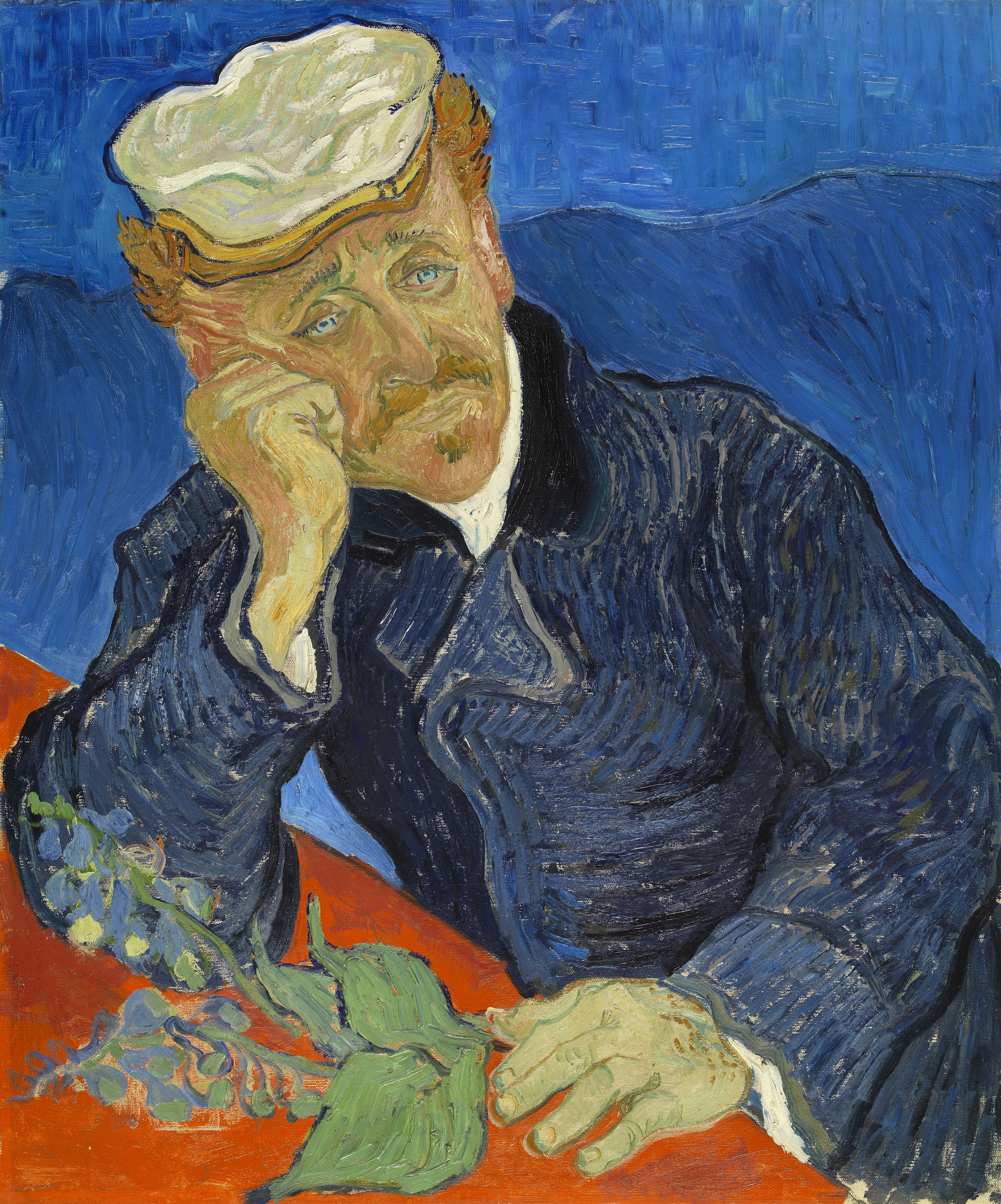
Vincent Van Gogh, Dr Paul Gachet, 1890, oil on canvas, 26x 22 cm.

Muter was famed as a premiere portraitist in Paris, during the 20's and 30's Muter would paint the portraits for the city's elite, such as: sculptor Chana Orloff, actress Dody Conrad, and artist Charles Fromuth. Although Muter enjoyed success with the wealthy, her work was never limited to them. Muter also accomplished many works with motherhood as a central theme.

The more Mela hoped to capture the essence of her sitters, the more expressionistic her paintings would become. Muter wrote of her portrait painting process: "I don't ask myself whether a person in front of my easels is good, false, generous, intelligent. I try to dominate them and represent them just as I do in the case of a flower, tomato or tree; to feel myself into their essence; if I manage to do that, I express myself through their personality."

After witnessing the tragedies of World War I, Muter's style went through another change. No longer preoccupied with the harsh realities, Muter hoped to capture the beauty and hope of her surroundings. This is reflected in her newfound use of bright colors and an even more liberal application of paint. Her works took on a new liveliness.
