= Jeannine Guillou =

French painter

- Born: 17 May 1909; Concarneau, France
- Died: 27 February 1946 (aged 36); Paris, France
- Known for: Painting
- Spouse: Olek Teslar
- Partner: Nicolas de Staël

Jeannine Guillou (17 May 1909 – 27 February 1946) was a French painter. She is known to be the first partner of Nicolas de Staël.

== Biography ==
Jeannine Guillou was born in Concarneau.

Guillou began to paint in 1924, and in 1928, and married Olek Teslar, one of her teachers.

In 1937, during a trip in Morocco she left him and became the partner of Nicolas de Staël, who she met in Morocco, and they remained together until her death from malnutrition and/or a therapeutic abortion.
