= Germain Viatte =

Canadian-born French art historian (1939–2024)

- Born: Germain Pierre Albert Gérard Viatte; 3 July 1939; Quebec City, Quebec, Canada
- Died: 3 May 2024 (aged 84)
- Education: École du Louvre; University of Paris
- Occupations: Art historian Curator

Germain Pierre Albert Gérard Viatte (3 July 1939 – 3 May 2024) was a Canadian-born French art historian and museum curator.

== Biography ==
Born in Quebec City on 3 July 1939, he was the son of writer Auguste Viatte and Marie-Louise Claro. His sister, Geneviève, was married to diplomat and geographer Pierre Deffontaines. He studied at the Écol du Louvre and the University of Paris. He joined management of French provincial museums in 1963 and later became Director-General of the Centre national d'art contemporain from 1970 to 1972, working out of the Hôtel Salomon de Rothschild.

From 1973 to 1974, Viatte was director of contemporary documentation at the Centre Pompidou before serving as curator of the Musée National d'Art Moderne from 1975 to 1984. The following year, he assisted in the construction and opening of the Musée des Arts africains, océaniens et amérindiens. He then returned to the Musée National d'Art Moderne, serving as its director from 1992 to 1997. In 1997, he joined the team of the Musée du Quai Branly – Jacques Chirac. In November 1999, he became director of the Musée national des Arts d'Afrique et d'Océanie until he reached the age limit of 65 in July 2004. He was also a member of the Iliazd-Club from 1990 to 2005.

Viatte died on 3 May 2024, at the age of 84.

== Decorations ==
- Officer of the Legion of Honour (2006)
- Knight of the Ordre national du Mérite
- Officer of the Ordre des Arts et des Lettres
- Pierre Daix Artbook Prize for L'envers de la médaille (2021)

== Publications ==
- L'Envers de la médaille : Mondrian, Dubuffet, les pouvoirs publics et l'opinion (2021)
