= Mikhail Gorchakov =

Mikhail Gorchakov (Russian: Михаил Горчаков) may refer to

- Mikhail Alkseyevich Gorchakov (1768–1831), Russian general
- Mikhail Alexandrovich Gorchakov (1839–1897), Russian diplomat
- Mikhail Dmitrievich Gorchakov (1793–1861), Russian general
