= Tishby =

Tishby is a surname. Notable people with the surname include:

- Naftali Tishby (1953–2021), professor of computer science and computational neuroscientist
- Noa Tishby (born 1977), Israeli actress
