= Louis Cattiaux =

French painter, poet and writer

Louis Cattiaux (17 August 1904 – 16 July 1953) was a French painter and poet.

== Biography ==
Louis Cattiaux was born in Valenciennes on 17 August 1904. He lost his mother at a very young age and was raised by his older sister. In 1914, he was evacuated with her sister to the Paris region and entered the Hanley boarding school. In 1922, he prepared his admission to the “Arts et Métiers” in Paris.

In 1928, he spent some time in Dahomey (Benin) as an employee of a commercial company. Then, he devoted himself more and more to painting. He began to associate with the avant-garde Parisian literary and artistic circles of the time. In 1932, he married Henriette Péré with whom he settled at n° 3 rue Casimir-Périer in Paris, where they opened an art gallery called Gravitations, in honour of the poet Jules Supervielle.

In 1934, he signed the manifesto Transhylisme with such painters as Jean Lafon, Pierre Ino, Jean Marembert, and poets as Louis de Gonzague Frick and Jules Supervielle. From 1936 onwards, he became more and more interested in alchemy. He then almost completely abandoned the practice of painting to devote himself to writing his book Le Message Retrouvé ou l’Horloge de la Nuit et du Jour de Dieu (The Message Rediscovered or the Clock of God’s Night and Day).

Louis Cattiaux died in Paris on 16 July 1953, following a spleen illness.

== Literary work ==
In 1938, Cattiaux started work on a series of maxims or aphorisms "encapsulating the inspiration of a friendly muse", and gives them the title of Le Message Perdu (The Lost Message). Over a number of years, while not neglecting his painting, he continues writing the book. By 1946, considering the work to be finished, he publishes it at his own expense under the title of The Message Rediscovered. Made up of twelve chapters, it comprises all the aphorisms that reflect his hermetic experience, numbered by verses and divided in two columns.

It was at this time that he began to write his Physics and Metaphysics of Painting. In 1947, he began a correspondence with Jean Rousselot and René Guénon. Thanks to a review by Guénon on The Message Rediscovered published in 1948 in the journal Études Traditionnelles, Louis Cattiaux got in touch in 1949 with Emmanuel d’Hooghvorst, author of Le Fil de Pénélope. This marked the beginning of an intense relationship between them and with Charles d'Hooghvorst, Emmanuel’s younger brother, whom he met in May 1949.

In 1951, Louis Cattiaux published an obituary to René Guénon in Théophile Briant’s poetic journal Le Goéland. He said in it: “He truly prepared the ways of the Lord by recalling the universal transcendence of divine revelation, and by denouncing, without ever weakening, the two perversions of God’s Science, that is the tenebrous occultism on the one hand, and the profane science on the other, which overwhelm the present world.” He ends his eulogy with these words: “René Guénon is not dead and his work only comes to the world, despite the extraordinary modesty he has always shown in all matters concerning the disclosure of his personality. I do not think I am betraying his thought by letting it be expressed through a few excerpts from his letters in this friendly journal. Having constantly illuminated the source of revealed life, it is right and proper that life should now illuminate him with its sweet and true light.”

In 1954, Les Poèmes du fainéant et les poèmes alchimiques, tristes, zen, d'avant, de la résonance, de la connaissance by Louis Cattiaux were published by Le Cercle du Livre. Also in 1954, excerpts from his essay on the Physics and Metaphysics of Painting were published in a Swiss journal, Les Cahiers Trimestriels Inconnues n° 96, as well as an article by Emmanuel d’Hooghvorst entitled “Le Message Prophétique de Louis Cattiaux.”

In 1956, the Message Rediscovered was published in its entirety for the first time by Éditions Denoël.

Currently, Louis Cattiaux’s literary works total more than twenty editions (with many reprints and translations of The Message Rediscovered). It is translated into Castilian, Catalan, English, Italian, Portuguese, German.

In 1999, a lecture dedicated to Cattiaux and The Message Rediscovered was held at the Sorbonne as part of the Canseliet Colloquium.

== The Message Rediscovered ==
In 1946, Louis Cattiaux published the first twelve chapters of The Message Rediscovered on his own account, with a preface by Lanza del Vasto. Then he continued to add new chapters (which he called “books”) until his death.

In September 1948, René Guénon published, in the issue 270 of the journal Études Traditionnelles, a review of The Message Rediscovered, which he concluded in these terms: “We do not know what ‘specialists’ of hermeticism, if any are still really competent, can think of this book, and how they will appreciate it; but what is certain is that it is far from being indifferent and that it deserves to be read and studied with care by all those who are interested in this aspect of the tradition.”

In 1956, the first complete edition was published by Denoël in Paris, with a presentation to the reader by Emmanuel and Charles d’Hooghvorst. A second edition was published in 1978 in Brussels. At the same time, various translations are published in Spain, Italy, Germany, Brazil, etc.

The Message Rediscovered is written in the form of sentences or verses arranged on two columns (in some cases, three) and divided into 40 books or chapters. This book, which took the author fifteen years to write, is the result of his spiritual experience. Each chapter is preceded by two epigraphs and followed by two hypographs from the Holy Scriptures of all nations. The Message Rediscovered is Louis Cattiaux’s masterpiece.

These aphorisms or verses deal with different subjects, each independently, while forming a homogeneous whole on fundamental human issues. The Message Rediscovered makes use of a particular language, it does not develop any subject systematically, but uses maxims.

== Works translated into English ==
Cattiaux, Louis, The Message Rediscovered, Grez-Doiceau, Éditions Beya, 2006.

Cattiaux, Louis, Physics and Metaphysics of Painting, Grez-Doiceau, Éditions Beya, 2012.

The Collected Letters of Louis Cattiaux, Grez-Doiceau, Éditions Beya, 2013.
