= Theodore Schempp =

American painter

Theodore William Schempp (1904–1988) was an American artist and art dealer. He dealt in pre-Columbian art, and modernist works. He sold to other dealers, institutions and collectors, and collected art in his own right.

== Early life ==
He was the second son of William Frederick Schempp and his wife Della Karstetter of Brodhead, Wisconsin, born February 10, 1904. His father edited the local newspaper there; and died in 1929.

Schempp attended Brodhead High School, and went on to Oberlin College, where he studied the piano. He graduated B.A. in 1926. He took the Conservatory music course there, to 1927, for the Mus.B. degree. He then moved to Paris, continuing his piano studies under Alfred Cortot. He also painted.

== Villa Schempp ==
The Villa Théodore Schempp was built by Marcel Zielinski, a student of Robert Mallet-Stevens, at 5 rue Gauguet, 14th arrondissement of Paris, over the years 1928 to 1931. It was part of a terraced development of International Style artists' studios at 3, 5 and 7 rue Gauguet. It was for a time in the 1950s the studio of Hans Hartung.

== Art dealer, Paris and New York ==
In 1937, Schempp abandoned his career in music, and concentrated on dealing in art. He sold two modernist painting at the beginning of the year to Walter Arensberg and his wife Louise. That year also, he sold a 1925 work by Marcel Duchamp to Earl Stendahl.

Georges Braque lived in the same area of Paris, with a studio on rue du Douanier; and he and Schempp became friends. Schempp sold a Braque still life from 1943 to Toledo Museum of Art, around 1950.

Ellen H. Johnson, a friend, wrote that Schempp "frequently traveled to the States, bringing with him fine examples of the current School of Paris". A 1940 exhibition of modern French art at Oberlin College showed works lent by Schempp, and others from the Herron Museum, Smith College Museum of Art and the Phillips Memorial Gallery. In the fall of 1941 Schempp was on the West Coast, where he hung an exhibition of Fernand Léger at the Stendahl Galleries.

Having spent years out of France, Schempp returned soon after the end of World War II. In 1946 Nicolas de Staël took a studio at 7 rue Gauguet, and associated with Braque. At this point he was selling in Paris through Louis Carré. Schempp met de Staël in 1947, and, from about 1950, was his dealer in the United States, selling his works in particular to collectors in the Mid West.

== Later life ==
In 1962 Schempp became dealer for Claude Garache. He died in Palm Springs, California in 1988.

== Family ==
In post-war Paris, Schempp met the artists' model Odile Arnould, and they formed a relationship. Much later, they were married.
